= List of postmodern novels =

Some well known postmodern novels in chronological order:

== Proto-postmodern and early postmodern novels (pre-1950) ==
- Steppenwolf (1927) by Hermann Hesse
- Orlando: A Biography (1928) by Virginia Woolf
- The Sound and the Fury (1929) by William Faulkner
- Flush: A Biography (1933) by Virginia Woolf
- Invitation to a Beheading (1936) by Vladimir Nabokov
- Professor Dowell's Head (1937) by Alexander Belyaev
- Finnegans Wake (1939) by James Joyce
- At Swim-Two-Birds (1939) by Flann O'Brien
- The Master and Margarita (1940) by Mikhail Bulgakov
- The Third Policeman (1940) by Flann O'Brien
- The Real Life of Sebastian Knight (1941) by Vladimir Nabokov
- The Glass Bead Game (1943) by Hermann Hesse
- Bend Sinister (1947) by Vladimir Nabokov
- The Cannibal (1949) by John Hawkes

== 1950s ==
- Molloy (1951) by Samuel Beckett
- Malone Dies (1951) by Samuel Beckett
- Player Piano (1952) by Kurt Vonnegut
- Junkie (1953) by William S. Burroughs
- The Unnamable (1953) by Samuel Beckett
- Lord of the Flies (1954) by William Golding
- Lolita (1955) by Vladimir Nabokov
- The Recognitions (1955) by William Gaddis
- The Floating Opera (1956) by John Barth
- On the Road (1957) by Jack Kerouac
- The End of the Road (1958) by John Barth
- Naked Lunch (1959) by William S. Burroughs
- The Tin Drum (1959) by Günter Grass

== 1960s ==
- The Sot-Weed Factor (1960) by John Barth
- Catch-22 (1961) by Joseph Heller
- The Lime Twig (1961) by John Hawkes
- Pale Fire (1962) by Vladimir Nabokov
- A Clockwork Orange (1962) by Anthony Burgess
- The Man in the High Castle (1962) by Philip K. Dick
- Mother Night (1962) by Kurt Vonnegut
- V. (1963) by Thomas Pynchon
- Cat's Cradle (1963) by Kurt Vonnegut
- Hopscotch (1963) by Julio Cortázar
- Second Skin (1964) by John Hawkes
- The Three Stigmata of Palmer Eldritch (1965) by Philip K. Dick
- In Cold Blood (1966) by Truman Capote
- The Crying of Lot 49 (1966) by Thomas Pynchon
- Snow White (1967) by Donald Barthelme
- One Hundred Years of Solitude (1967) by Gabriel García Márquez
- Myra Breckenridge (1968) by Gore Vidal
- The Universal Baseball Association, Inc., J. Henry Waugh, Prop. (1968) by Robert Coover
- Lost in the Funhouse (1968) by John Barth
- Do Androids Dream of Electric Sheep? (1968) by Philip K. Dick
- The Left Hand of Darkness (1969) by Ursula Le Guin
- Slaughterhouse-Five (1969) by Kurt Vonnegut
- The French Lieutenant's Woman (1969) by John Fowles
- Ada or Ardor: A Family Chronicle (1969) by Vladimir Nabokov
- Ubik (1969) by Philip K. Dick

== 1970s ==
- Moscow-Petushki (1970) by Venedikt Yerofeyev
- The Atrocity Exhibition (1970) by J. G. Ballard
- Fear and Loathing in Las Vegas (1971) by Hunter S. Thompson
- Chimera (1972) by John Barth
- G. (1972) by John Berger
- Mumbo Jumbo (1972) by Ishmael Reed
- Invisible Cities (1972) by Italo Calvino
- Crash (1973) by J. G. Ballard
- Gravity's Rainbow (1973) by Thomas Pynchon
- Breakfast of Champions (1973) by Kurt Vonnegut
- Look at the Harlequins! (1974) by Vladimir Nabokov
- Oreo (1974) by Fran Ross
- Flow My Tears, the Policeman Said (1974) by Philip K. Dick
- Terra Nostra (1975) by Carlos Fuentes
- J R (1975) by William Gaddis
- The Dead Father (1975) by Donald Barthelme
- The Autumn of the Patriarch (1975) by Gabriel García Márquez
- A School for Fools (1976) by Sasha Sokolov
- A Scanner Darkly (1977) by Philip K. Dick
- The World According to Garp (1978) by John Irving
- If on a winter's night a traveler (1979) by Italo Calvino
- The Book of Laughter and Forgetting (1979) by Milan Kundera

== 1980s ==
- The Name of the Rose (1980) by Umberto Eco
- Between Dog and Wolf (1980) by Sasha Sokolov
- Coin Locker Babies(1980) by Ryu Murakami
- Midnight's Children (1981) by Salman Rushdie
- Valis (1981) by Philip K. Dick
- A Wild Sheep Chase (1982) by Haruki Murakami
- The Queue (1983) by Vladimir Sorokin
- Shame (1983) by Salman Rushdie
- Money (1984) by Martin Amis
- The Unbearable Lightness of Being (1984) by Milan Kundera
- Neuromancer (1984) by William Gibson
- Nights at the Circus (1984) by Angela Carter
- The Illuminatus! Trilogy (1984) by Robert Shea and Robert Anton Wilson
- Palisandriia (1985) by Sasha Sokolov
- Hard-Boiled Wonderland and the End of the World (1985) by Haruki Murakami
- Satantango (1985) by László Krasznahorkai
- White Noise (1985) by Don DeLillo
- The Handmaid's Tale (1985) by Margaret Atwood
- The New York Trilogy (1985–86) by Paul Auster
- Red Sorghum (1986) by Mo Yan
- Kashira Highway (1986) by Andrei Monastyrski
- Foe (1986) by J. M. Coetzee
- Beloved (1987) by Toni Morrison
- The Bonfire of the Vanities (1987) by Tom Wolfe
- Pushkin House (1987) by Andrei Bitov
- Libra (1988) by Don Delillo
- Wittgenstein's Mistress (1988) by David Markson
- Foucault's Pendulum (1988) by Umberto Eco
- Dance Dance Dance (1988) by Haruki Murakami
- The Satanic Verses (1988) by Salman Rushdie
- A History of the World in 10½ Chapters (1989) by Julian Barnes

== 1990s ==
- The Black Book (1990) by Orhan Pamuk
- Vineland (1990) by Thomas Pynchon
- Soul Mountain (1990) by Gao Xingjian
- Haroun and the Sea of Stories (1990) by Salman Rushdie
- American Psycho (1991) by Bret Easton Ellis
- Time's Arrow (1991) by Martin Amis
- The Gold Bug Variations (1991) by Richard Powers
- Mao II (1991) by Don Delillo
- Generation X: Tales for an Accelerated Culture (1991) by Douglas Coupland
- Leviathan (1992) by Paul Auster
- Snow Crash (1992) by Neal Stephenson
- Memories of the Ford Administration (1992) by John Updike
- Sarajevo Blues (1992) by Semezdin Mehmedinović
- The House of Doctor Dee (1993) by Peter Ackroyd
- Roman (1994) by Vladimir Sorokin
- The Island of the Day Before (1994) by Umberto Eco
- The Norm (1994) by Vladimir Sorokin
- Brazil (1994) by John Updike
- Their Four Hearts (1994) by Vladimir Sorokin
- Galatea 2.2 (1995) by Richard Powers
- The Wind-Up Bird Chronicle (1995) by Haruki Murakami
- Marina’s 30th Love (1995) by Vladimir Sorokin
- The Tunnel (1995) by William H. Gass
- Blindness (1995) by José Saramago
- The Lost Scrapbook (1995) by Evan Dara
- Chapaev and Void (1996) by Victor Pelevin
- CivilWarLand in Bad Decline (1996) by George Saunders
- Infinite Jest (1996) by David Foster Wallace
- Primeval and Other Times (1996) by Olga Tokarczuk
- Underworld (1997) by Don DeLillo
- Mason & Dixon (1997) by Thomas Pynchon
- Toward the End of Time (1997) by John Updike
- The Infinite Deadlock (1997) by Dmitry Galkovsky
- My Name Is Red (1998) by Orhan Pamuk
- Glamorama (1998) by Bret Easton Ellis
- The Savage Detectives (1998) by Roberto Bolaño
- Motherless Brooklyn (1999) by Jonathan Lethem
- The Ground Beneath Her Feet (1999) by Salman Rushdie
- The Intuitionist (1999) by Colson Whitehead
- Sputnik Sweetheart (1999) by Haruki Murakami
- Blue Lard (1999) by Vladimir Sorokin
- Generation P (1999) by Victor Pelevin
- A Series of Unfortunate Events (1999-2006) by Daniel Handler

== 2000s ==
- White Teeth (2000) by Zadie Smith
- Pastoralia (2000) by George Saunders
- The Amazing Adventures of Kavalier & Clay (2000) by Michael Chabon
- A Heartbreaking Work of Staggering Genius (2000) by Dave Eggers
- House of Leaves (2000) by Mark Z. Danielewski
- The Cave (2000) by José Saramago
- Baudolino (2000) by Umberto Eco
- Gertrude and Claudius (2000) by John Updike
- An Episode in the Life of a Landscape Painter (2000) by César Aira
- The Blind Assassin (2001) by Margaret Atwood
- number9dream (2001) by David Mitchell
- Fingernails (2001) by Mikhail Elizarov
- You Shall Know Our Velocity (2002) by Dave Eggers
- The Double (2002) by José Saramago
- Everything Is Illuminated (2002) by Jonathan Safran Foer
- Snow (2002) by Orhan Pamuk
- Kafka on the Shore (2002) by Haruki Murakami
- VAS: An Opera in Flatland (2002) by Steve Tomasula and Stephen Farrell
- The Curious Incident of the Dog in the Night-Time (2003) by Mark Haddon
- Elizabeth Costello (2003) by J. M. Coetzee
- 2666 (2004) by Roberto Bolaño
- Cloud Atlas (2004) by David Mitchell
- The Mysterious Flame of Queen Loana (2004) by Umberto Eco
- Slow Man (2005) by J. M. Coetzee
- JPod (2006) by Douglas Coupland
- Life and Death Are Wearing Me Out (2006) by Mo Yan
- In Persuasion Nation (2006) by George Saunders
- Against the Day (2006) by Thomas Pynchon
- Empire V (2006) by Victor Pelevin
- The Yiddish Policemen's Union (2007) by Michael Chabon
- The Librarian (2007) by Mikhail Elizarov
- The Easy Chain (2008) by Evan Dara
- The White Tiger (2008) by Aravind Adiga
- Inherent Vice (2009) by Thomas Pynchon
- Generosity: An Enhancement (2009) by Richard Powers
- 1Q84 (2009-2010) by Haruki Murakami
- Z213: Exit (2009-2018) by Dimitris Lyacos
- t (2009) by Victor Pelevin

== 2010s ==
- Witz (2010) by Joshua Cohen
- Cartoons (2010) by Mikhail Elizarov
- Swamplandia! (2011) by Karen Russell
- A Visit from the Goon Squad (2011) by Jennifer Egan
- The Sense of an Ending (2011) by Julian Barnes
- The Paper Menagerie (2011) by Ken Liu
- The Pale King (2011) by David Foster Wallace
- Die Zeit, die Zeit (2012) by Martin Suter
- Bleeding Edge (2013) by Thomas Pynchon
- Batman Apollo (2013) by Victor Pelevin
- A Brief History of Seven Killings (2014) by Marlon James
- Satin Island (2015) by Tom McCarthy
- The Day the Sun Died (2015) by Yan Lianke
- Book of Numbers (2015) by Joshua Cohen
- The Familiar Volume 1, Volume 2, Volume 3, Volume 4, and Volume 5 (2015-2017) by Mark Z. Danielewski
- Swing Time (2016) by Zadie Smith
- The Underground Railroad (2016) by Colson Whitehead
- Moonglow (2016) by Michael Chabon
- 4 3 2 1 (2017) by Paul Auster
- Killing Commendatore (2017) by Haruki Murakami
- The White Book (2017) by Han Kang
- Lincoln in the Bardo (2017) by George Saunders
- theMystery.doc (2017) by Matthew McIntosh
- iPhuck 10 (2017) by Victor Pelevin
- Secret Views of Mount Fuji (2018) by Victor Pelevin
- Ducks, Newburyport (2019) by Lucy Ellmann
- Quichotte (2019) by Salman Rushdie
- Black Leopard, Red Wolf (2019) by Marlon James
- The Art of Light Touches (2019) by Victor Pelevin

== 2020s ==
- Antkind (2020) by Charlie Kaufman
- Interior Chinatown (2020) by Charles Yu
- The Anomaly (2020) by Hervé Le Tellier
- Transhumanism Inc. (2021) by Victor Pelevin
- KGBT+ (2022) by Victor Pelevin
- The Candy House (2022) by Jennifer Egan
- Annihilation (2022) by Michel Houellebecq
- Journey to Eleusis (2023) by Victor Pelevin
- Krut’ (2024) by Victor Pelevin
- Udol (2025) by Mikhail Elizarov
- Shadow Ticket (2025) by Thomas Pynchon
- Until the Victim Becomes our Own (2025) by Dimitris Lyacos
- The Coast of Everything (2026) by Guillermo Stitch

== See also ==
- List of postmodern critics
- List of postmodern writers
- Postmodern literature
- Postmodern art
- Postmodern film and television
- Graphic novel
- Criticism of postmodernism
- Pop culture fiction
- Literary fiction
