= List of postmodern writers =

This is a list of postmodern authors.

== A ==
- Kathy Acker
- Peter Ackroyd
- Edward Albee
- Anna Alchuk
- Isabel Allende
- Martin Amis
- Gloria Anzaldúa
- Yurii Andrukhovych
- Yuri Arabov
- Alberto Arbasino
- Fernando Arrabal
- John Ashbery
- Oğuz Atay
- Yusuf Atılgan
- Margaret Atwood
- Paul Auster

== B ==
- J. G. Ballard
- John Banville
- Amiri Baraka
- Julian Barnes
- José Baroja
- John Barth
- Donald Barthelme
- Samuel Beckett
- Saul Bellow
- John Berryman
- Andrei Bitov
- Roberto Bolaño
- María Luisa Bombal
- Jorge Luis Borges
- T. C. Boyle
- Giannina Braschi
- Richard Brautigan
- Michael Brodsky
- Christine Brooke-Rose
- Nicole Brossard
- Pascal Bruckner
- Gesualdo Bufalino
- Charles Bukowski
- Zaza Burchuladze
- Anthony Burgess
- William S. Burroughs
- Michel Butor
- A. S. Byatt

== C ==
- Pat Cadigan
- Italo Calvino
- Elias Canetti
- Mary Caponegro
- Mircea Cărtărescu
- Angela Carter
- Raymond Carver
- Theresa Hak Kyung Cha
- Michael Chabon
- Caryl Churchill
- Hélène Cixous
- Chris Cleave
- J. M. Coetzee
- Brendan Connell
- Vincenzo Consolo
- Robert Coover
- Julio Cortázar
- Douglas Coupland
- John Crowley
- Mitch Cullin

== D ==
- Mark Z. Danielewski
- Evan Dara
- Stefano D'Arrigo
- Lydia Davis
- Samuel R. Delany
- Don DeLillo
- Junot Díaz
- Philip K. Dick
- E. L. Doctorow
- J. P. Donleavy
- Sergei Dovlatov
- Margaret Drabble
- Arkadii Dragomoshchenko
- Marguerite Duras
- Bob Dylan

== E ==
- Umberto Eco
- Dave Eggers
- T. S. Eliot
- Mikhail Elizarov
- Bret Easton Ellis
- Louise Erdrich
- Péter Esterházy

== F ==
- Dan Fante
- Raymond Federman
- Amanda Filipacchi
- Dario Fo
- Jonathan Safran Foer
- Jonathan Franzen
- Carlos Fuentes
- Richard Foreman

== G ==
- Carlo Emilio Gadda
- William Gaddis
- Neil Gaiman
- William H. Gass
- Dumitru Găleșanu
- William Gibson
- Allen Ginsberg
- John Giorno
- Dmitry Glukhovsky
- William Golding
- Nadine Gordimer
- Hedwig Gorski
- Jorie Graham
- Alasdair Gray
- Michael Grothaus
- Andrei Gusev

== H ==
- Jessica Hagedorn
- John Hawkes
- Brenda Hillman
- Brandon Hobson
- Siri Hustvedt
- Joseph Heller
- Michel Houellebecq

== I ==
- Luce Iragaray
- John Irving
- Robert Irwin
- Christopher Isherwood
- Kazuo Ishiguro

== J ==
- Shelley Jackson
- Marlon James
- B. S. Johnson
- Lawrence Joseph

== K ==
- Metin Kaçan
- Ismail Kadare
- Richard Kalich
- Igor Kholin
- Reza Khoshnazar
- Danilo Kis
- Julia Kissina
- Christian Kracht
- László Krasznahorkai
- Sigizmund Krzhizhanovsky
- Milan Kundera
- Tony Kushner
- Jack Kerouac
- Ken Kesey

== L ==
- Wally Lamb
- Doris Lessing
- Mark Leyner
- José Lezama Lima
- Eduard Limonov
- Tao Lin
- Clarice Lispector
- Patricia Lockwood
- Robert Ludlum
- Dimitris Lyacos
- Dominic Lyne
- Jonathan Lethem

== M ==
- Claudio Magris
- Dacia Maraini
- David Markson
- Gabriel García Márquez
- Yann Martel
- Carole Maso
- Cormac McCarthy
- Tom McCarthy
- Joseph McElroy
- Jon McGregor
- Czesław Miłosz
- Yukio Mishima
- Alan Moore
- Grant Morrison
- Toni Morrison
- Alice Munro
- Haruki Murakami

== N ==
- Vladimir Nabokov
- Maggie Nelson
- Charu Nivedita
- Jeff Noon
- Alice Notley

== O ==
- Tim O'Brien
- Flannery O'Connor
- Michael Ondaatje
- Amos Oz

== P ==
- Chuck Palahniuk
- Orhan Pamuk
- Suzan-Lori Parks
- Nicanor Parra
- Alexei Parshchikov
- Milorad Pavić
- Victor Pelevin
- Georges Perec
- Lyudmila Petrushevskaya
- Cecile Pineda
- Richard Powers
- Terry Pratchett
- Dmitry Prigov
- Alexander Prokhanov
- Thomas Pynchon

== Q ==
- Rexhep Qosja
- Raymond Queneau
- Ann Quin

== R ==
- Ishmael Reed
- Adrienne Rich
- Tom Robbins
- Philip Roth
- Lev Rubinstein
- Salman Rushdie
- Joanna Russ

== S ==
- Nina Sadur
- Mark SaFranko
- J. D. Salinger
- José Saramago
- Nathalie Sarraute
- George Saunders
- Ann Scott
- Will Self
- Elif Shafak
- Vladimir Sharov
- Elena Shvarts
- Leslie Marmon Silko
- Charles Simic
- Isaac Bashevis Singer
- Zadie Smith
- Sasha Sokolov
- Vladimir Sorokin
- Art Spiegelman
- Neal Stephenson
- Ali Smith

== T ==
- James Tiptree Jr. (a.k.a. Alice Sheldon)
- Olga Tokarczuk
- Tatyana Tolstaya
- Pier Vittorio Tondelli
- Hasan Ali Toptaş
- Michel Tournier
- David Trinidad
- Anne Tyler

== V ==
- Enrique Vila-Matas
- William T. Vollmann
- Kurt Vonnegut

== W ==
- David Foster Wallace
- D. Harlan Wilson
- Jeanette Winterson

== Y ==
- Venedikt Yerofeyev
- Viktor Yerofeyev
- Marguerite Young
- Kim Young-ha

== Z ==
- Yilin Zhong

== See also ==
- List of postmodern critics
- List of postmodern novels
- Postmodern literature
