= A School for Fools =

1976 Russian-language novel by Sasha Sokolov

- Author: Sasha Sokolov
- Original title: Школа для дураков
- Language: Russian
- Genre: Literary fiction
- Publisher: Ardis Publishing
- Publication date: 1976
- Publication place: USSR
- Pages: 169
- OCLC: 2182126
- Dewey Decimal: 891.73/3 20
- LC Class: PG3488.O356 S5 1976

A School for Fools (tr. Shkola dlia durakov) is a novel by Soviet author Sasha Sokolov. The first draft of the book was completed in 1973 and distributed via samizdat. In 1975 a manuscript was submitted to Ardis Publishing and it was published in the United States in 1976. For the annotation, the publisher, Carl Proffer, used compliments on the work from Vladimir Nabokov's letter. In 1977 Ardis published the English-language translation by Carl Proffer. A new English translation by Alexander Boguslawski was published by NYRB Classics in November 2015.

== Plot ==
The novel doesn't have a linear plot, but rather presents events as recalled by the main character. The protagonist, student So-and-so (Russian: ученик Такой-то (Note: "Такой-то" is a Russian placeholder name)), is a student who has a mental disorder and nonlinear time perception, which he believes he inherited from his grandmother. So-and-so is in a constant discussion with his "other self" and has difficulty distinguishing between "yesterday," "today," and "tomorrow."

The protagonist attends a special education school, where he studies in a class taught by his favorite teacher, geographer Pavel Petrovich Norvegov, whom the author also calls Saul (Note: Russian "Pavel" is 'Paul', and calling the teacher Saul is a Biblical pun: Paul the Apostle was Saul of Taurus) Petrovich. He is also in love with another teacher, Veta. The accounts of their lives and the lives of some other minor characters highlight the reality of a repressive Soviet regime.

Following graduation, So-and-So goes on to work in a variety of jobs, from "sharpening pencils" to being a conductor. The narrative comes to an abrupt conclusion as the author runs out of paper.

== Reception ==
in 1996, Wolfgang Kasack described the book as "the most surrealistic work of modern Russian literature."

Mikhail Berg stressed the importance of the Christian worldview in the work and noted that the outstanding asset of the book is that its language and compositional peculiarities stem directly from the peculiarities of the protagonist.

In the opinion of Mark Lipovetsky A School for Fools directly follows Nabokov's literary tradition and paves the way to the most important and interesting phenomena of the 21st century Russian prose, including works by Alexander Goldstein, Denis Osokin, Nikolay Kononov, and others.
