= Gorbunov and Gorchakov =

Poem by Joseph Brodsky

- Author: Joseph Brodsky
- Original title: Gorbunov i Gorchakov
- Translator: Carl Ray Proffer and Assya Kumesky (one translation), Harry Thomas (another translation), Alan Myers (one more translation)
- Language: Russian
- Genre: poem
- Publication date: 1970
- Publication place: Russia
- Media type: Print

Gorbunov and Gorchakov (Russian: Горбунóв и Горчакóв) is a poem by Russian and English poet, essayist, dramatist Joseph Brodsky.

== Composition and plot ==
Gorbunov and Gorchakov is a forty-page long poem.

Gorbunov and Gorchakov are patients in a mental asylum near Leningrad. The poem consists of lengthy conversations between these two patients in the Soviet psychiatric prison as well as between each of them separately and the interrogating psychiatrists. The topics vary from the taste of the cabbage served for supper to the meaning of life and Russia's destiny.

In Sanna Turoma’s words, the psychiatric hospital of Gorbunov and Gorchakov as a metaphor of the Soviet State is one example of Brodsky’s perception of the Kafkaesque absurdity of Soviet surreality. Gorbunov and Gorchakov mirrors the balance that Brodsky struck when he was compelled to weigh the benefits and dangers of psychiatric diagnosis in his dealings with the Soviet state.

In the poem, fourteen cantos are named in a such way that the table of contents in Russian language has the rhyming structure of the sonnet:

1. Gorbunov and Gorchakov
2. Gorbunov and Gorchakov
3. Gorbunov in the Night
4. Gorchakov and the Doctors
5. A Song in the Third Person
6. Gorbunov and Gorchakov
7. Gorbunov and Gorchakov
8. Gorchakov in the Night
9. Gorbunov and the Doctors
10. A Conversation on the Porch
11. Gorbunov and Gorchakov
12. Gorbunov and Gorchakov
13. Conversations about the Sea
14. Conversation in a Conversation

== History ==
At the very end of 1963, Brodsky was committed for observation to the Kashchenko psychiatric hospital in Moscow where he stayed for several days. A few weeks later, his second hospitalization took place: on 13 February he was arrested in Leningrad and on 18 February the Dzerzhinsky District Court sent him for psychiatric examination to ‘Pryazhka’ (Psychiatric Hospital No. 2 located on the Pryazhka River Embankment) where he spent about three weeks, from 18 February to 13 March. These two stints in psychiatric establishments formed the experience underlying Gorbunov and Gorchakov called by Brodsky ‘an extremely serious work.’. The poem was written between 1965 and 1968 and published in 1970.

== Translations ==
There are several English translations of the poem including one by Carl Ray Proffer with Assya Kumesky, one by Harry Thomas and one by Alan Myers.
