= Second Skin (novel) =

1964 novel by John Hawkes

- 1st edition cover
- Author: John Hawkes
- Language: English
- Genre: Postmodern literature
- Publisher: New Directions Publishing
- Publication date: 1964
- Publication place: United States
- Media type: Print (Paperback)
- Pages: 210 pp
- Preceded by: The Lime Twig
- Followed by: The Innocent Party

Second Skin is a 1964 novel by John Hawkes.

== Plot ==
The story is told by a 1st-person narrator, a fifty-nine-year-old ex-naval lieutenant whose name is Edward, though other characters usually call him Skipper or Papa Cue Ball (due to his baldness). Though the tone of the novel strives to be comic and optimistic, the narrator's life is beset by a series of tragic events: his father (a mortician), his wife, and his daughter Cassandra commit suicide; his son-in-law Fernandez is killed after he has left Cassandra to live with his gay lover; Skipper is beaten up and perhaps raped during a mutiny on board of U.S.S. Starfish, the ship he commands in W.W.II; he is harassed by a small clan of shady fishermen on the "black island" in north-Atlantic where he settles after leaving the US Navy. The narrator eventually finds shelter in a tropical island with his black mess boy, Sonny, and his lover Catalina Kate, though it is not clear if the scenes on the island, where Skipper works as an artificial inseminator, are real or simply imagined.

The novel is told in a non-linear fashion through a series of flashbacks. It is then at first difficult for the reader to understand the reasons of some weird episodes, such as the one which takes place in the second chapter, when Skipper, goaded by Cassandra, has the name of his son-in-law Fernandez tattooed on his chest in green ink. We subsequently discover that Fernandez has left Cassandra because their marriage was no more than a masquerade, devised to hide Skipper's incestuous relation to his daughter (which may also explain his wife Gertrude's suicide).

== Structure ==
The chapters of the novel alternate moments in the present of the tropical island with flashbacks that show readers moments of the past in a jumbled fashion.

- Naming Names is an introduction of the main characters of the novel.
- Agony of the Sailor: thinking he will have "Cassandra" tattooed across his chest, Skipper agrees to undergo the painful procedure, only to discover Cassandra has instructed the tattooist to inscribe "Fernandez" instead. Sonny greets them when they leave for the East Coast.
- Soldiers in the Dark: Skipper, Cassandra and Pixie (Fernandez and Cassandra's daughter) travel on a Greyhound coach from the West to the East Coast. The coach is hijacked in the desert by three soldiers gone AWOL.
- The Artificial Inseminator: Skipper is on the tropical island with Sonny and Catalina Kate.
- The Gentle Island: after having discovered that Fernandez has been killed, Skipper settles on the "black island" off the northeast coast of North America and meets Miranda, a widow whose purpose is unclear.
- Cleopatra's Car: one cold night Skipper goes with Cassandra and a group of locals, Red and his sons Jomo and Bub, who have lecherous designs on Cassandra, to a dance in the high school gym. Skipper leaves the dance and is pelted by snowballs; then he finds out that Red, Jomo, Bub and Cassandra have left the party, so that he has to walk back home. On the way, Miranda tempts or teases him, and he flees.
- Vile, in The Sunshine Crawling: Catalina Kate lies in the sand on her pregnant belly with an iguana clamped on her back; Skipper tries to chase the reptilian away but fails, and contents himself with waiting for the iguana to go away.
- Wax in the Lilies: the marriage of Fernandez and Cassandra; Gertrude's funeral.
- The Brutal Act: Tremlow's mutiny on the U.S.S. Starfish; Skipper, while on patrol duty, finds Fernandez dead (with his lover Harry, a sailor) in a seedy hotel in an East Coast city; Skipper's father commits suicide.
- Land of Spices: Skipper, on the tropical island, inseminates a cow called Phyllis.
- Drag Race on the Beach: a trip on Red's fishing boat on rough sea; Jomo takes Cassandra to the lighthouse; Bub distracts Skipper; Cassandra commits suicide; Skipper leaves the "black island".
- The Golden Fleas: Kate gives birth to her and Skipper's child; there is a wake in the island's cemetery on All Saints' night.
