= Layli Long Soldier =

Native American poet

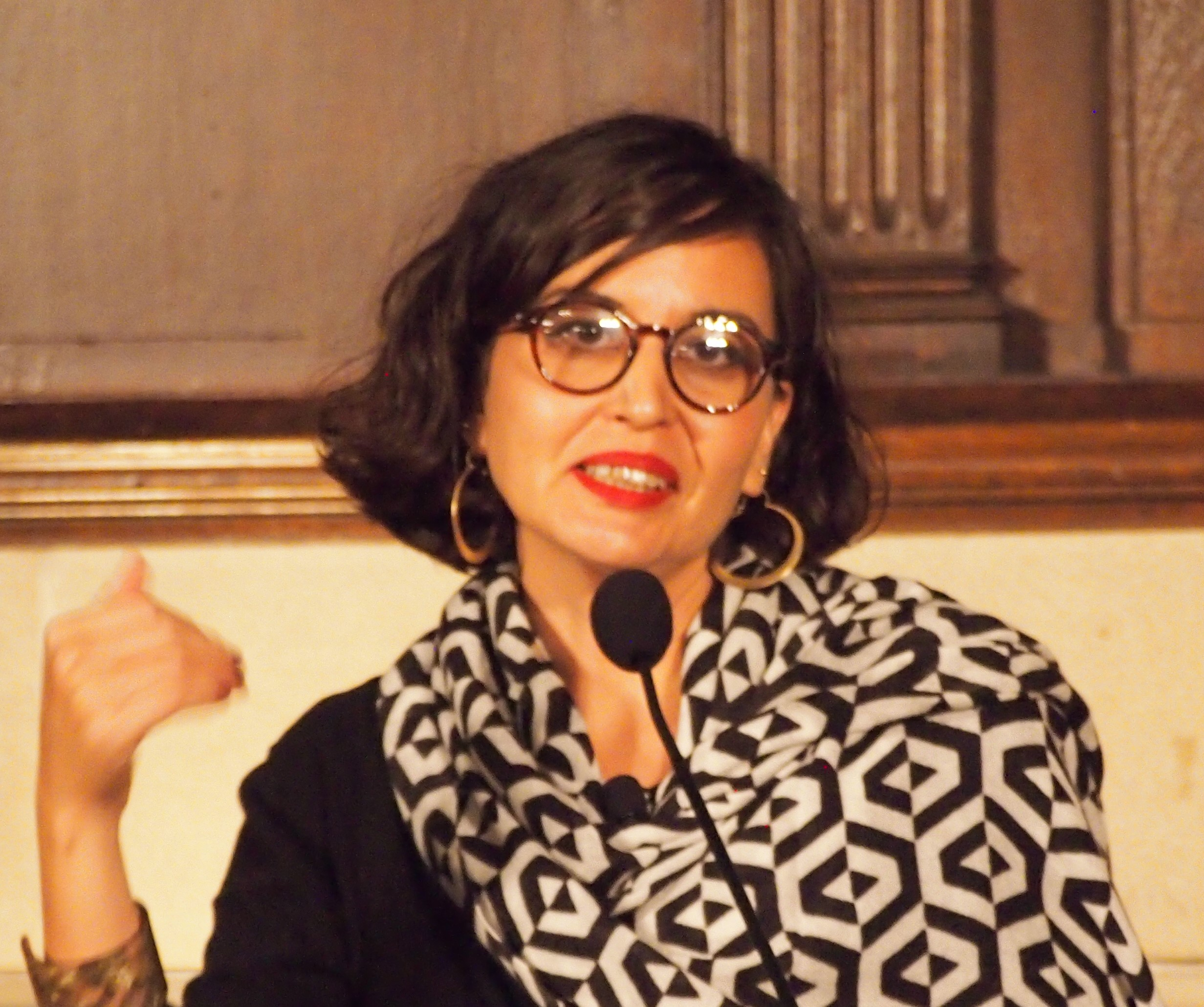
- Education: Institute of American Indian Arts; Bard College
- Occupations: Artist; Writer
- Writing career
- Years active: 2010–present
- Notable awards: Whiting Award; Lannan Literary Award; MacArthur Fellowship

Layli Long Soldier is an Oglala Lakota writer, poet, visual artist, and educator. She is best known for her poetry collection Whereas (2017), which references the 2009 United States Congressional Apology to Native peoples. Her work uses visual poetics and often covers Indigenous history.

She is the author of the chapbook Chromosomory (2010), the poetry collection Whereas (2017), the digital poetry series Night Poems and Day Poems (2022), and the hybrid text We (2026). Long Soldier has received numerous literary honors, including the Whiting Award, the Lannan Literary Fellowship, the PEN/Jean Stein Book Award, a 2026 MacArthur Fellowship and has been a finalist for the National Book Award. Her work addresses Indigenous history, the ethics of documentation, and motherhood.

== Early life and education ==
Long Soldier grew up in the Four Corners region of the Southwest (United States) and is a citizen of the Oglala Lakota Nation. She has described never growing up in one specific place, but feeling the most at home in Santa Fe, New Mexico.

In a Women's Quarterly Conversation interview, she described her childhood as having a connection to sound and music. She said that music was her first artistic language and she initially aspired to be a professional singer. In her childhood, she played violin and piano, and later electric guitar and bass. She also credited her mother’s training as a pianist with influencing her early involvement in music. She has described sound as one of the most formative elements of her youth.

Although she studied creative writing in college, Long Soldier has stated that she did not initially envision herself as a professional writer. Her journey began by writing privately during her childhood, keeping notebooks of what she later described as “dictionary poems,” where she experimented with definitions, English and Lakota language, and syntax. She has characterized this practice as the "silent” counterpart to her musical practice, describing the two disciplines as parallel forms of expression, later becoming crucial to her literary method.

She earned a Bachelor of Fine Arts (BFA) in Creative Writing from the Institute of American Indian Arts (IAIA) and later completed a Master of Fine Arts (MFA) from Bard College. During her graduate studies, she lived and taught in Navajo Nation communities. After graduating, she continued to live and work while advocating or Indigenous rights.

== Career ==
In 2010, Layli Long Soldier published the chapbook Chromosomory. This chapbook introduces her distinct style of creating visual poetry.

In 2013, she participated in the art exhibit Pte Oyate (Pté is Buffalo, Oyate is Nation) at the Red Cloud Indian School, alongside Roger Broer, Michael Two Bulls, and Keith Brave Heart.

In 2015, Long Soldier joined the faculty in the English department of Diné College. Long Soldier is an editor of the journal Drunken Boat and the poetry editor for Kore Press.

In 2017, her first volume of poetry, Whereas, was published in by Graywolf Press. The collection examines the historical narratives of Native tribes in the United States through a thoughtful investigation of language. The book received national attention for its interrogation of political rhetoric.

In 2022, Long Soldier created Night Poems and Day Poems as part of a poetry commission from the Holt/Smithson Foundation. The series reflects on human relationships with weather and climate, forming a part of the World Weather Network project, which gathers artistic responses to global weather observations.

Beyond her literary career, Layli Long Soldier also creates visual art. Her art practice often involves creating shapes out of her poem's structure, adding to ideas relevant to her poem. She also creates architectural sculptures by using materials such as steel, textiles, mirrors. These sculptures often reflect themes from her literature as well.

== Poetry ==
=== Chromosomory ===
Long Soldier’s first published chapbook, Chromosomory (2010), was published by Q Ave Press in 2010. This work was the beginning of her professional publishing career.

=== Whereas ===
Long Soldier’s first full-length poetry collection, Whereas (2017), was published by Graywolf Press in 2017. Whereas responds to the passed 2009 U.S. Congressional Apology to Native Peoples for the history of genocidal policies and actions enacted by the United States Federal government against Indigenous peoples. In writing these poems, Long Soldier studied similar apologies from governments worldwide to Indigenous peoples and considered the nature of an authentic apology.

The volume's longest poem, the five-page "38," recounts how 38 Dakota warriors were hanged, with the approval of President Lincoln, after the Dakota War of 1862 on December 26, 1862. Long Soldier writes, "This was the same week that President Lincoln signed the Emancipation Proclamation." Long Soldier read this poem in the documentary Lakota Nation vs. United States, forming one of the narrative backbones of the film. The poem was also the finalist for the National Book Award for poetry and won the National Book Critic Circle award and the PEN/Jean Stein Book award.

Whereas also invokes personal experiences, including Long Soldier's reflections on her relationship with her daughter and motherhood.

=== Night Poems and Day Poems ===
In 2022, Long Soldier created Night Poems and Day Poems as part of a poetry commission from the Holt/Smithson Foundation's World Weather Network project, which gathers artistic responses to global weather observations. These poems incorporate visual art, structuring her text to create shapes that add meaning to her poems. These poems were designed for digital viewing and presented on an outdoor exhibit.

These poems look at human relationships with nature. Both poems are publicly available for download through the Foundation's website.

=== We ===
Long Soldier's second full-length collection We (2026) was published by Graywolf Press. A hybrid text, it includes not only poetry but lyric essays and original artwork.

== Visual art ==
Layli Long Soldier creates visual art and sculptures. Her art practice is often an extension of the themes described in her literature.

She creates art through her poetry by manipulating the poems' structure into physical shapes on paper like in Whereas (2017) and in her digital versions of Night Poems and Day Poems (2022).

She also creates architectural sculptures using materials such as steel, textiles, mirrors to create symbolic art. One example is the sculpture titled Carrier, which is a winged dress made out of these kinds of materials and incorporates 215 small, braided elements. This piece was created in response to locating 215 Indigenous children in unmarked graves at the former Kamloops Residential School in Canada. This sculpture is discussed a lot in her essay, "Now You Will Listen."

== Themes and literary significance ==
Some scholars interpret Long Soldier’s work through Chadwick Allen's Trans-Indigenous theory. This approach connects Indigenous literature on a global scale. Trans-Indigenous approaches argue against colonial literary assumptions and expectations. Long Soldier’s unique use of syntax and visual form aligns with Trans-Indigenous ideas that challenges Western disciplinary constraints. An example of this theory is reflected in her essay, "Now You Will Listen" where she "writes about writing," not following traditional American English rules. She uses a distinct form of writing to add more depth in how her work is interpreted.

The concept, survivance can also be applied to her work. Survivance is defined as the continuance of Indigenous stories and history. It explains that 20th century academic discourse often projects stories of Indigenous people through decline or loss. Long Soldier’s work resists these narratives by using critique.

Long Soldier examines themes of language and power, specifically in Whereas (2017), where she examines federal documents, legal texts, and public apologies. She uses her work to articulate the lived truths against colonial state narratives and several of her pieces come from her use of “documentary poetics,” a method she uses to analyze the rhetoric and structure of official documents.

Long Soldier has also written about motherhood, describing it as a site of responsibility, fear, intimacy. Rather than treating motherhood as purely celebratory, her work emphasizes that writing about her child requires precision and restraint, protecting the child’s emotional life.

== Public engagement ==
Long Soldier participates in public readings, lectures, and conversations on Indigenous literature and political language. She has appeared in prominent reading series and university forums, including events hosted by Harvard University’s Woodberry Poetry Room.

Her work has been featured in documentary contexts, including the film Lakota Nation vs. United States, in which her poem “38” functions as a narrative for discussions on treaty rights and federal accountability.

== Awards and honors ==
- 2015 Lannan Literary Fellowship
- 2016 National Artist Fellowship from the Native Arts and Cultures Foundation
- 2016 Whiting Award
- 2017 National Book Award for Poetry, finalist for Whereas
- 2017 National Book Critics Circle Award for Poetry, winner for Whereas
- 2018 Griffin Poetry Prize, shortlisted for Whereas
- 2018 PEN/Jean Stein Book Award, winner for Whereas
- 2021 Michael Murphy Memorial Poetry Prize for Whereas
- 2021 Academy of Arts and Letters Award for Literature
- 2025 Foundation for Contemporary Arts Wright Award for Poetry
- 2026 MacArthur Fellow

== Works ==
- —— (2010). Chromosomory. Lubbock, TX: Q Ave Press.
- —— (2012) “Ȟe Sápa”. Essay/Poem. The Kenyon Review
- —— (2013). Pte Oyate. Painting. Red Cloud Indian School.
- —— (2017). Whereas. Minneapolis: Graywolf Press. ISBN 9781555977672.
- —— (2017). Obligations and Mosquitoes. Art Sculpture.
- —— (2021) Carrier. Art sculpture.
- —— (2022) "Now You Will Listen." Essay.
- —— (2022).Lakota Nation vs. United States. Documentary appearance.
- —— (2022). Night Poems and Day Poems. Digital Commissioned Series, Holt/Smithson Foundation.
- —— (2026). We. Graywolf Press. ISBN 978-1-64445-417-6
