= Charivari (novel) =

1949 novel by American writer John Hawkes

- Author: John Hawkes
- Language: English
- Publication date: 1949
- Publication place: United States

Charivari is a 1949 novel by American writer John Hawkes. Hawkes began the novel, his first, in Montana while on a "working vacation". Hawkes, in a 1978 conversation with John Barth, referred to the novel as his first foray into writing fiction, having previously written poetry. In a 1983 interview published in the Review of Contemporary Fiction Hawkes characterized the novel as sharing themes, especially that of innocence, with his later work The Lime Twig.
