= Twenty Sonnets to Mary Stewart =

Twenty Sonnets to Mary Stewart (Russian: Двадцать сонетов к Марии Стюарт) is a cycle of sonnets Brodsky, written in 1974, published for the first time in Russian Literature Triquarterly, 1975, No.11 and in 1977 in the book "Part of Speech". According to the classical structure, "Twenty Sonnets to Mary Stewart" consists of 20 verses and 14 lines each, written in iambic pentameter. Brodsky extends the concept of a sonnet - both formally and stylistically. He alternates or mixes French, Italian and English types of sonnets, and uses unusual for sonnets rhyme schemes, and quite atypical (for example, in the last stanza) a breakdown of the sonnet into parts.
