= The Blood Oranges (novel) =

1971 novel by American writer John Hawkes

- Author: John Hawkes
- Language: English
- Publication date: 1971
- Media type: Print (Hardback)

The Blood Oranges is a 1971 novel by American writer John Hawkes. The novel belongs to a triad, along with Death, Sleep, & the Traveler and Travesty. The story takes place in a fictionalized version of Illyria.

Webster Schott, writing in Life, referred to the novel as "...poetry passing as fiction, intellectualism doubling as sex daydream."
