= Ellendea Proffer =

American author and publisher (born 1944)

Ellendea Proffer Teasley (born 1944) is an American author, publisher, and translator of Russian literature into English.

== Biography ==
She received her bachelor's from University of Maryland and Ph.D. from Indiana University Bloomington, taught at Wayne State University and University of Michigan, Dearborn. She is a well-known Bulgakov expert, translator and publisher. She is known for Mikhail Bulgakov: Life & Work (1984); translations of Bulgakov's plays and prose; numerous articles and introductions, most prominently the Notes and Afterword to the Burgin-O'Connor translation of Bulgakov's The Master and Margarita.

She married Carl R. Proffer (1938–1984), and co-founded Ardis Publishers in 1971, a publishing house specializing in Russian literature, both in English and Russian. As a publisher, she was responsible for the collected works of Bulgakov in Russian, which then triggered a Soviet edition. Proffer Teasley edited a series of well-received photo-biographies, including those devoted to Nabokov, Tsvetaeva and Bulgakov. Her memoir of Joseph Brodsky, Brodsky Among Us, was published in English in 2017, after the Russian translation was published in Moscow in 2015, where it became a bestseller.

Ellendea Proffer was on the first judges' panel for the Booker Russian Novel Prize, and in 1989 received a Macarthur Fellowship for her work with Ardis.

The Ardis archives, including Carl and Ellendea Proffer's papers, are held at University of Michigan. The archive consists of a collection of manuscripts, typescripts, correspondences, books, photographs, and proofs of selected titles.

== Lectures in English ==
- "One Book, Two Cultures: Brodsky Among Us" (Harvard Davis Center, 2017). https://www.youtube.com/watch?v=2FuBDigwrQw
- "How Censorship Leads to Tamizdat [publishing abroad]" (Tamizdat Conference, Hunter College, New York City, 2018). https://www.youtube.com/watch?v=fOPmbJaKCGg
- "Writing in a Time of Terror: Mikhail Bulgakov" (Dillard University, New Orleans, 2019). https://vimeo.com/326628255
- "Ardis: Americans Publishing Russian Literature during the Cold War" (Princeton University, Princeton, New Jersey, 2023). https://www.youtube.com/watch?v=myiisMjCIwg
- "Totalitarianism: Myth & Reality" (Duke University, Durham, 2024)

== Videos ==
"Totalitarianism then and now." 2025. https://www.youtube.com/watch?v=pvJ-WBwRZw0

"Totalitarianism part 2." 2025. https://www.youtube.com/watch?v=SwqVugm2z0w

== Talks in Russian ==
- "Brodskii sredi nas" (Dostoevsky Library, Moscow, 2015) with Anton Dolin. http://www.youtube.com/watch?v=ijYImQyhi5U
- "O knige Karla Proffera «Bez kupior»" (MMOMA, Moscow, 2017) with Anton Dolin). https://www.youtube.com/watch?v=Cn2XBbQ9Iss

== Awards ==
- 1989 MacArthur Fellows Program
