= Whereas (book) =

2017 collection of poetry by Layli Long Soldier

- Author: Layli Long Soldier
- Language: English, Lakota
- Genre: Poetry
- Published: 2017
- Publisher: Graywolf Press

Whereas is a 2017 collection of poetry written by Oglala Lakota author, Layli Long Soldier. The collection was written as a direct response to S.J. Res 14, a congressional apology and resolution to the native peoples of the United States. This apology, signed by President Obama in 2009, is relatively unknown as it was closed to the public. Thus the apology itself was never directly pointed towards any people of indigenous descent. Whereas is a personal reaction to this and a documentation of life as a member of the Oglala Sioux tribe.

== Reception ==
In 2017, Whereas was awarded the National Book Critics Circle Award and was a finalist for the 2017 National Book Award for Poetry. In 2018, the community continued its praise by awarding the collection the PEN/Jean Stein Book Award and as a finalist for the 2018 Griffin Poetry Prize.

Whereas has received primarily positive and enthusiastic reviews. Natalie Diaz of The New York Times hails, “Long Soldier reminds readers of their physical and linguistic bodies as they are returned to language through their mouths and eyes and tongues across the fields of her poems." In The Los Angeles Times, John Freeman writes, "She has rubbed two languages together and made their shared silences into gravel — paving a perch from which a reader can see clearly. Like all balconies built of stone and glass, you will not believe how strong it is, but you can stand on it. She is, after all."

== Awards ==
2017 National Book Award for Poetry Finalist

2017 National Book Critics Circle Award

2018 PEN/Jean Stein Book Award

2018 Griffin Poetry Prize Finalist
