= Part of Speech (book) =

"Part of speech" - the name of the cycle of Joseph Brodsky's poems created in the years 1975–1976. This cycle gave the name of a book of poems, published in 1977 by the publishing house "Ardis". The self-titled, but radically different in composition, collection of selected poems of the poet was published in 1990 in the USSR. Released in 1980 under the same name, the English-language book of poems by Brodsky only consists of half of the translations of the poems included in the Russian edition of 1977. Translation cycle "Part of Speech" in English, made with the participation and edited by Brodsky, including 15 of the 20 cycle of poems, whose order was also changed from the Russian original.

== See also ==
- Joseph Brodsky
- Poetry
