= The Devil Is a Southpaw =

2025 novel by Brandon Hobson

- Author: Brandon Hobson
- Language: English
- Genre: Literary fiction, postmodern, Postmodern literature, magical realism, postcolonial novel, metafiction
- Publisher: Ecco Press
- Publication date: 2025
- Publication place: United States
- Media type: Print (hardback & paperback)
- ISBN: 978-0063259652

The Devil Is a Southpaw is a 2025 novel by Brandon Hobson. It is a postmodern, postcolonial, magical realism novel told by its main protagonist, an unreliable narrator named Milton Muleborn. The novel employs a metafiction narrative by introducing a fictional character named Brandon H. who has received a manuscript titled The Devil is a Southpaw by Milton Muleborn, whom he knew many years earlier, and presents to the reader in a foreword.

The Devil Is a Southpaw was a finalist for the PEN/Jean Stein Book Award and longlisted for the PEN Faulkner Award. Excerpts appeared in Mcsweeney's, Conjunctions, and Southwest Review.

== Plot summary and background ==
The novel is told in three parts in a nonlinear narrative and follows two boys whose lives intertwine inside a violent juvenile detention facility: Matthew Echota, an eccentric and brilliant Cherokee artist, and Milton Muleborn, the unreliable narrator. The novel uses comic elements, absurdism and black humor in parts as a way to denounce and critique a society of authority and juvenile incarceration. Often veering into surreal asides by using elements of horror and fantasy, the novel uses drawings, paintings, poems, and photography through the perspective of the two boys to employ a hallucinogenic and surreal blur between fiction and reality. Doppelgangers of Salvador Dali and Frida Kahlo appear in the first part of the book as the boys flee to escape the detention center run by a man named Strangelove, a nod to the novel's many allusions to art and films.

In an interview with Scott Simon on NPR, Hobson stated that the narrator, Milton Muleborn, tries to manipulate the reader by using long sentences and difficult vocabulary and obscure language as an attempt to write a heavy literary work, and that his obsessive envy of Matthew Echota makes his sanity questionable.

The novel has been described as having the energy of a creative genius through stretching the form of the novel to its linguistic and structural limits.
