= The Cannibal (Hawkes novel) =

1949 novel by John Hawkes

- First edition
- Author: John Hawkes
- Language: English
- Genre: Postmodern literature
- Publisher: New Directions Publishing
- Publication date: 1949
- Publication place: United States
- Media type: Print (Paperback)
- Pages: 195 pp
- Followed by: The Beetle Leg

The Cannibal is a 1949 novel by John Hawkes, partially based on Hawkes's own experiences in the Second World War.

== Plot ==
The novel is divided in three parts. The first and the last are set in 1945, in an imaginary small German town ravaged by the war, Spitzen-on-the-Dein. The second part takes place during the First World War, from 1914 (the title of this part of the novel) to 1918.

It is difficult to outline the plot of the novel, because when the narrative shifts from 1945 to 1914, the relation of the characters in that part of the novel to those of the first and last part is not explicitly stated; the only continuity is the presence in all three parts of Madame Snow; in 1914, Stella Snow is a young and promising night club singer, daughter of a German general. She is the owner of a boarding house in the destitute Spitzen-on-the-Dein of 1945.

However, the story, told in a surrealistic, or anti-realistic, fashion, may be summarized by saying that the two parts of the novel set in 1945 depict the material and moral wasteland created by Nazism and World War II while the first part can be said to show the roots of those horrors in the years of earlier German imperialism and the humiliating defeat of 1918.

While the first and last part are told by a first-person narrator, Zizendorf, who masterminds a crackpot plot to kill Leevey, the American overseer of the occupied German town and start a rebellion of the defeated Germans against the Allied invaders, the central part is a third-person narrative where fragments of the past are told, describing episodes which involve Herman, the owner of a tavern and his son Ernst (who marries Stella), and a mysterious Englishman called Cromwell, who seems to have sided with the Germans against England but might also be a spy.

== Legacy ==
One of the earliest commentators of the novel, Albert J. Guerard, who taught Hawkes creative writing, maintains that "(...) the tiny, gutted Spitzen-on-the-Dein—with its feverish D.Ps., its diseased impotent adults and crippled children, with its foul choked canals, with its hunger, militarism, primitive memories and its unregenerate hatred of its conqueror—is Germany itself in microcosm". Guerard links Hawkes's surrealistic or anti-realistic depiction of postwar Germany with Kafka's twisted image of the United States in Amerika; Hawkes's destructured novel is thus connected to modernist fiction. Hawkes was praised by Thomas Pynchon, and it is likely that both The Cannibal and The Lime Twig were important sources of inspiration for his masterpiece Gravity's Rainbow. Hence, this novel can be read as one of the first examples of postmodern literature and an important link between modernism and postmodernism.

== Bibliography ==
- Armstrong, Thomas W. "Reader, Critic, and the Form of John Hawkes' The Cannibal" Boundary 2 Vol. 5, No. 3, (Spring, 1977), pp. 829–844.
- Emmett, Paul J. "The Cannibal to The Passion Artist: Hawkes's Journey toward the Depths of the Unconscious." Chicago Review. Vol. 32, No. 1 (Summer, 1980), pp. 135–152
