= Robert Kalich =

American novelist

- Born: New York City, U.S.
- Occupation: Novelist
- Years active: 1969–present
- Title: Author
- Relatives: Richard Kalich
- Website: robertkalich.com

Robert Alan Kalich is an American novelist, journalist, and producer. His works include The Handicapper (1981), a novel centered around an obsessive gambler. He co-directs a film companywith his twin brother Richard Kalich.

== Personal life ==
Kalich was born and lives in New York City. He lives with his wife and son in New York City and North Salem. Robert's twin brother, Richard Kalich, is also a writer.

Kalich started his career as a journalist at the New York Daily Mirror. In 1969, he compiled The Baseball Rating Handbook. Stepping outside of the world of sports that same year, he also wrote The Negro Manifesto.

Other works by Kalich include:

- The Handicapper (1981)
- A Twin Life (2003)
- The Investigation of Ariel Warning (2012)
- David Lazar (2019)
- A Man Divided (2021)
- Impossible to Be Human (2022)
