= List of postmodern critics =

This is a list of postmodern literary critics.

== A ==
- Gloria E. Anzaldúa
- Paul Auster

== B ==
- Roland Barthes
- Subimal Basak
- Jean Baudrillard
- Michael Bérubé
- Homi K. Bhabha
- Maurice Blanchot
- Jay David Bolter
- Jorge Luis Borges
- Pierre Bourdieu
- Judith Butler

== C ==
- Alex Callinicos
- Chantal Chawaf
- Malay Roy Choudhury
- Hélène Cixous
- Robert Coover

== D ==
- Guy Debord
- Gilles Deleuze
- Jacques Derrida
- Alexandr Dugin

== E ==
- Terry Eagleton
- Umberto Eco

== F ==
- Stanley Fish
- Michel Foucault

== G ==
- Marjorie Garber
- Gerard Genette
- Sandra Gilbert
- Félix Guattari
- Susan Gubar

== H ==
- Donna Haraway
- Ihab Hassan
- N. Katherine Hayles
- Stephen Hicks
- bell hooks
- Linda Hutcheon - Historiographical metafiction

== I ==
- Luce Irigaray

== J ==
- Fredric Jameson
- Keith Jenkins
- Michael Joyce

== K ==
- Friedrich Kittler
- Julia Kristeva

== L ==
- Jacques Lacan
- George Landow
- Jean-François Lyotard

== M ==
- Lev Manovich
- Gabriel García Márquez
- Larry McCaffery
- Brian McHale
- Trinh T. Minh-ha
- Toni Morrison
- Stuart Moulthrop
- Haruki Murakami

== P ==
- Thomas Pynchon

== R ==
- Bryan Reynolds
- Richard Rorty
- Samir Roychoudhury

== S ==
- Ernesto Sabato
- Edward Said
- Eve Kosofsky Sedgwick
- Gayatri Chakravorty Spivak
- Allucquere Rosanne Stone (Sandy Stone)

== V ==
- Gianni Vattimo

== W ==
- David Foster Wallace
- Patricia Waugh
- Ken Wilber
- Monique Wittig

== Z ==
- Ravi Zacharias
- Slavoj Žižek

== See also ==
Early critics important to postmodernism:

- Søren Kierkegaard
- Claude Lévi-Strauss
- Friedrich Nietzsche
- Ferdinand de Saussure

General:

- Cultural studies
- Gender studies
- Hungryalism
- List of postmodern novels
- List of postmodern writers
- Literary theory
- Post-colonialism
- Poststructuralism
- Postmodern literature
- Second-wave feminism
- Third-wave feminism
