= PEN/Jean Stein Book Award =

American literary award

PEN/Jean Stein Book Award is awarded by the PEN America to honor a "a book-length work of any genre for its originality, merit, and impact". The award of $75,000 is one of the richest prizes given by the PEN American Center. It was first awarded in 2017.

The award is one of many PEN awards sponsored by International PEN affiliates in more than 145 PEN centers around the world. The PEN American Center awards have been characterized as being among the "major" American literary prizes.

== Winners and finalists ==
Previous winners and finalists
Year	Author	Title	Result	Ref.
2017	Hisham Matar	The Return: Fathers, Sons and the Land in Between	Winner	
2017	Teju Cole	Known and Strange Things	Finalist	
2017	Tyehimba Jess	Olio	Finalist	
2017	Jane Mayer	Dark Money: The Hidden History of the Billionaires Behind the Rise of the Radical Right	Finalist	
2017	Colson Whitehead	The Underground Railroad	Finalist	
2018	Layli Long Soldier	Whereas	Winner	
2018	Ta-Nehisi Coates	We Were Eight Years in Power: An American Tragedy	Finalist	
2018	Hari Kunzru	White Tears	Finalist	
2018	Victor LaValle	The Changeling	Finalist	
2018	Kevin Young	Bunk: The Rise of Hoaxes, Humbug, Plagiarists, Phonies, Post-Facts, and Fake News	Finalist	
2019	Nana Kwame Adjei-Brenyah	Friday Black	Winner	
2019	Ada Limón	The Carrying: Poems	Finalist	
2019	José Olivarez	Citizen Illegal	Finalist	
2019	Richard Powers	The Overstory	Finalist	
2019	Tara Westover	Educated: A Memoir	Finalist	
2020	Yiyun Li	Where Reasons End	Winner	
2020	Anne Boyer	The Undying	Finalist	
2020	Ilya Kaminsky	Deaf Republic: Poems	Finalist	
2020	Rion Amilcar Scott	The World Doesn't Require You	Finalist	
2020	Chris Ware	Rusty Brown	Finalist	
2021	Ross Gay	Be Holding: A Poem	Winner	
2021	Anthony Cody	Borderland Apocrypha	Finalist	
2021	Akwaeke Emezi	The Death of Vivek Oji	Finalist	
2021	Mattilda Bernstein Sycamore	The Freezer Door	Finalist	
2021	Kawai Strong Washburn	Sharks in the Time of Saviors: A Novel	Finalist	
2022	Daisy Hernández	The Kissing Bug	Winner	
2022	Joy Williams	Harrow	Finalist	
2022	Percival Everett	The Trees	Finalist	
2022	Dantiel W. Montiz	Milk Blood Heat	Finalist	
2022	Carolina de Robertis	The President and the Frog	Finalist	
2023	Percival Everett	Dr. No	Winner	
2023	Nick Drnaso	Acting Class	Finalist	
2023	Bernadette Mayer	Milkweed Smithereens	Finalist	
2023	Noor Naga	If an Egyptian Cannot Speak English	Finalist	
2023	Sofia Samatar	The White Mosque	Finalist	
2024	No award conferred. (Note: Ten books were nominated for the 2024 PEN/Jean Stein Book Award, though nine withdrew, protesting the organization's response to the crisis in Gaza.)			
2025 (Note: No winner was selected in 2025; the finalist list initially had five contenders, though two withdrew, protesting the organization's response to the crisis in Gaza.)	Venita Blackburn	Dead in Long Beach, California	Finalist	
2025	Victoria Chang	With My Back to the World: Poems	Finalist	
2025	Timothy Snyder	On Freedom	Finalist	
2026	Brandon Hobson	The Devil is a Southpaw	Finalist	
2026	Joy Williams	The Pelican Child	Finalist	
2026	Yiyun Li	Things in Nature Merely Grow	Finalist	
2026	Cannupa Hanska Luger	SURVIVA: A Future Ancestral Field Guide	Finalist	
2026	Arthur Sze	Into the Hush	Finalist	
