= Richard Kalich =

American novelist

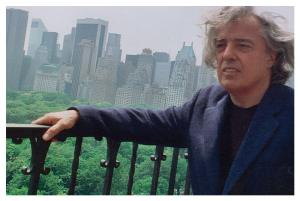
- Born: New York City, U.S.
- Occupation: Novelist
- Relatives: Robert Kalich
- Writing career
- Period: 1987–present
- Genres: Absurdist fiction, Postmodern fiction
- Movement: Postmodernism
- Website: richardkalich.com

Richard Kalich, the author of The Nihilesthete (1987), Penthouse F (2010) and Charlie P (2005) published in 2014 in a single volume as Central Park West Trilogy, The Zoo (2001) and The Assisted Living Facility Library (2019). He has been nominated for the National Book Award and for a Pulitzer Prize. His novels are internationally acclaimed and widely translated: his novels have been published in Bulgaria, Denmark, England, Germany, Israel, the Netherlands, Russia, Sweden, Turkey, and Japan. Kalich was born and lives in New York City where he co-directs a film company with his twin brother, Robert Kalich.

== Works ==
=== Central Park West Trilogy ===
Central Park West Trilogy includes three novels, The Nihilesthete, Penthouse F and Charlie P., originally published separately and collected for the first time in a single volume by the European publisher Betimes Books.

==== The Nihilesthete ====
The Nihilesthete, first published in 1987 in US by The Permanent Press, and in 1989. in the UK under the title The Cry of the Cat by Marion Boyars Publishing, was selected by The Philadelphia Inquirer as one of the most noteworthy books of the year and heralded by the San Francisco Chronicle as "one of the most powerfully written books of the decade". It was nominated for a PEN/Faulkner Award for Fiction, Hemingway Foundation/PEN Award, a National Book Award, and Pulitzer Prize. A social caseworker Haberman becomes obsessed with one of his wards, Brodski, a quadriplegic with "a cri du chat" syndrome, when he discovers that "the idiot" is actually an esthete and an artist. Haberman, probably a failed artist himself, first makes it his mission to help Brodski realize his ambition, then driven by jealousy, starts probing the depths of his ward's creative determination.

==== Penthouse F ====
Penthouse F, first published in 2010 by Green Integer, is a meta-fictional novel in the form of an inquiry into the death of a young boy and girl in the Manhattan penthouse of a writer named Richard Kalich. Suicide or murder? The reader is the jury as the fictional Kalich's own personal documents, and notes on a novel in progress are presented as well as the interview transcripts between "The Investigator," Kalich the Protagonist, and his acquaintances. Kalich the Author blurs the lines between reality and fantasy, making the reader create his own reality and—maybe—discover the truth.

==== Charlie P ====
Charlie P was first published in 2005 by Green Integer.

Charlie P, the main character of the novel, decides, at age three, when his father dies, to overcome mortality by becoming immortal: by not living his life, he will live forever. From then on, his whole life and his tragi-comic misadventures happen only in his mind.

=== The Zoo ===
The Zoo is a 2001 darkly comic allegorical novel written in the tradition of political satire, the narrative follows the character Wise Old Owl and his efforts to "animalize" Animal World. Aided by figures such as Muerte Buzzard, Sly Fox, and Michael Ferret, Wise Old Owl constructs a zoo to confine animals held responsible for the world's plight. The facility targets visually distinct animals first, followed by artists, intellectuals, and individuals deemed dangerous for possessing an inner life. Mirroring human society, some of the more courageous characters ultimately mount a resistance.

=== The Assisted Living Facility Library ===
Published in 2019 by Betimes Books, Ireland. This metafictional novel a meditation on life and art, and the sacrifice of one to the other.

== Writing ==
Kalich is considered to be a postmodernist and absurdist. In his works he often criticizes voyeuristic digital culture and laments the loss of literary culture, loss of self and the identity. Other recurrent themes in Kalich's works are absurdity, cruelty and sadism, obsession, surveillance, spiritual diminishment, powerlessness, and manipulation. He is influenced by and compared to Franz Kafka, Samuel Beckett, Witold Gombrowicz, Albert Camus, Mark Danielewski, Georges Bataille, Ken Kesey and Paul Auster.

== Reception ==
=== About his writing ===
"Richard Kalich is a successful novelist, one who has succeeded in consistently producing perplexing fictions that fail to categorize themselves and escape the warping influence of authorial intent." Christopher Leise, Electronic Book Review

"He's after what it means to be profoundly out of step with one's culture yet still unwilling to let go of the American dream." Brian Evenson

"Kalich represents the best in contemporary fiction. He has every chance to become- why not? - a living classical author." Hooligan Literary Magazine, Moscow

"Speaks with a singular honesty, power and eloquence about our spiritually diminished modern world." Mid-American Review

=== About The Nihilesthete ===
"One of the most powerfully written books of the decade." San Francisco Chronicle

"A brilliant, hammer-hitting, lights-out novel." Los Angeles Times

"As important and original a novel to have been written by an American author in a generation." Mid-American Review

"A major American writer." Carlin Romano, Philadelphia Inquirer

"Remarkable . . . the aesthetic effect is a bit like having the wind knocked out of you." Richard Fuller

=== About Penthouse F ===
"This is an important work that deserves to be read by everyone interested in serious fiction." Marc Lowe, Review of Contemporary Fiction

"[Penthouse F] is akin to the best work of Paul Auster in terms of its readability without sacrificing its intelligence of experiment. […] Kalich delivers afresh, relevant, and enticingly readable work of metafiction." American Book Review

"Thrilling and confusing in equal measure, Penthouse F is an important book that dismantles the reader, leaving you in fragmented bits and pieces like the barbed clips that make up the novel’s structure." Colin Herd, 3:AM Magazine

"Ghosts haunt this book from the first page to last: Dostoevsky, Mallarme, Kafka, Mann, Camus, Pessoa, Gombrowicz--and, oh yes, most perniciously of all, "Kalich." For he is a man who tortures himself both with the novels he has written and with those he has not. Let us forgive him even if he will not forgive himself, recognizing as we do the one truth of this tale that seems to be beyond doubt: "It was all in his head like everything else about him." Warren Motte, World Literature Today

"A marvelous book. It manages to do in a short novel what the great postmodernists like Coover and Barth take five or six hundred pages to do." Brian Evenson

"If one of the great European intransigents of the last century - say, Franz Kafka or Georges Bataille or Witold Gombrowicz - were around to write a novel about our era of reality TV and the precession of simulacra, the era of Big Brother and The Real World, what would it look like? Well, it might look like Richard Kalich’s Penthouse F." Brian McHale

"In the strange, sometimes frank ways that Robbe-Grillet and Cooper and Acker approach a kind of lurking moral presence in their work, Kalich too creates something somehow both spiritually clouded and passively demanding: what is going on here, in this business of words, and people? The answer, perhaps both political and existential, whether you agree with one side or the other, operates in the way texts I most often enjoy to get wrapped up in invoke: a door that once opened, is opened, and you can’t get it all the way back shut, try how you must. This is a book, a body of work, an author, deserving a new unearthing eye." Blake Butler, HTML Giant

=== About Charlie P ===
"Charlie P is energetic, delightfully sardonic, dark without being oppressive, playful and very readable. Richard Kalich has hit a voice that commands attention and allows the reader to endlessly and wittily process cultural hyperbole and inflated newspeak. Charlie P is the urban everyman, the self-regarding and coreless creature of our times. Kalich has captured him through endless reflections down the tunnel of the facing mirrors. One reads and reads and smiles. Charlie P captures the note of our late modern times." Sven Birkerts

"With his continuous comic exaggeration, Kalich is able to describe, highly uniquely, the overwhelming, vertiginous, risky sensation of being alive." American Book Review

"Like most good comic novelists, Kalich is adept at teetering on the precipice wherein he might decide to dilute the fun with the grim, creating that suspense where things might get really bad at any moment." Rain Taxi Review of Books

"[Kalich is] after what it means to be profoundly out of step with one’s culture yet still unwilling to let go of the American dream. And this tension between dream and reality makes Charlie P a deliciously painful book." Bookforum

"I would rather that the familiar be embraced and the novel resonates beyond itself and intone the spheres of Plato and Beckett. Charlie P resonates." Review of Contemporary Fiction

=== About The Zoo ===
"The Zoo starts where Animal Farm leaves off." - Velon Shuzkeil

"Kalich has written the definitive novel on the stupidity of intolerance" - Marion Boyars

== Nominations and awards ==
Year	Award	Work	Nominee/Winner
1987	New American Writing Award	The Nihilesthete	Winner
1988	Pulitzer Prize	The Nihilesthete	Nomination
1987	PEN/Faulkner Award for Fiction	The Nihilesthete	Finalist
1987	Hemingway Foundation/PEN Award	The Nihilesthete	Nomination
1987	National Book Award	The Nihilesthete	Nomination
1987	One of Carlin Romanos "Most Noteworthy" novels of 1987.	The Nihilesthete	Winner
1987	Representative of US titles at the Frankfurt Book Fair	The Nihilesthete	Winner
