= Carl Proffer =

Carl Ray Proffer (September 3, 1938, Buffalo, New York – September 24, 1984, Ann Arbor, Michigan) was an American publisher, scholar, professor, and translator of Russian literature. He was the co-founder (with Ellendea Proffer) of Ardis Publishers, the largest publishing house devoted to Russian literature outside of the Soviet Union, and co-editor of Russian Literature Triquarterly (1971–1991).

A major force in Russian-American literary relations from 1969 until his death, Carl R. Proffer was at first known as a Slavic scholar. He received a PhD at age 25, and became a tenured professor at 34. He taught at Reed College, Indiana University and University of Michigan. A dedicated, accessible teacher, he took part in many aspects of university life, including by giving public lectures and organizing conferences.

Proffer's first books were The Simile in Gogol’s "Dead Souls" (1968), a study of Nikolai Gogol's style, Letters of Nikolai Gogol (a translation) (1968), and Keys to "Lolita" (1968), the first study of Nabokov’s novel as serious literature. A reviewer in the TLS referred to these works as “profferized”: 'that is, exciting, energetic with the critic's own liveliness and enthusiasm pulsing through a scholarly apparatus formidable.... To have published these three studies within the space of a year is an astonishing achievement for a previously unknown scholar.'

The book on Nabokov's novel and Proffer's memoirs, The Widows of Russia (1984), were published in Russian. Proffer went on to do numerous and translations, and edited many anthologies of Russian writing. Proffer wrote a series of articles about Soviet writers and censorship, several published in The New York Review of Books, and gave many radio and television interviews, believing that informing the public about culture under the Soviets was beneficial to both sides.

In 1969, he and his wife traveled to the Soviet Union for six months, which proved to be the stimulus for the creation of Ardis Publishers. In spring of 1971, Ardis began with reprints of works in Russian by Mandelstam and Bulgakov and the first issue of Russian Literature Triquarterly (RLT) (1971–1991), which centered on Akhmatova, Mandelstam, Bulgakov and Joseph Brodsky.

RLT was meant to reveal the many sides of Russian literature, focusing in particular on the writers little known in the West and repressed in the Soviet Union. It featured many photographs, translations and a texts and documents section in which Soviet scholars could publish important works under pseudonyms, to avoid persecution by the Soviet authorities. The last issue, published in 1991, was devoted to Nabokov, and was the occasion for tributes to the effect RLT had had on the field.

Ardis and RLT made every effort to be literary rather than political, but this became harder as the seventies wore on. In 1972, Proffer and his family were in Joseph Brodsky's room when the poet was called in by the authorities and encouraged to leave before Nixon's visit to the Soviet Union. Proffer immediately told Brodsky, who at this time was little known in America, that he would get him a job as poet in residence at the University of Michigan. Proffer met Brodsky's plane in Vienna and after enormous effort got him an American visa and a place at the University of Michigan.

Ann Arbor became a stop on the Russian literary underground railway, as a stream of prominent writers came to visit Ardis or teach at the university. Proffer mentored numerous émigré writers, arranging for them to go into academia. Proffer made yearly trips to the Soviet Union until 1979, when the publication of the politically controversial anthology Metropol’ caused him to be banned from the Soviet Union. Diagnosed with cancer in 1982, he would never see Russia again; he died in 1984, at the age of forty-six. He is survived by his wife and four children—Andrew, Christopher, Ian and Arabella.

A memorial evening in honor of Carl Proffer was held at the New York Public Library on April 1, 1985. Attending were Arthur A. Cohen, Sasha Sokolov, Joseph Brodsky, Susan Sontag and many other notable Russian and American literary figures. In his speech, Joseph Brodsky expressed his deep gratitude to Proffer for his many kindnesses as a friend and as a publisher. Through Ardis, Brodsky said, Proffer had done for Russian literature what Russia could not do for itself.
