= Matthew McIntosh =

American writer (born 1977)

- Born: 1977 (age 48–49); Federal Way, WA
- Occupation: Writer
- Writing career
- Period: 2003–present
- Genre: Fiction
- Notable works: Well (2003) theMystery.doc (2017)
- Website: themysterybook.com

Matthew McIntosh (born 1977 in Federal Way, WA) is an American writer known for his 2003 novel Well. His second novel, theMystery.doc, was published in 2017.

== Biography ==
=== Early years ===
McIntosh is a native of Federal Way, Washington. He graduated from the creative writing program at the University of Washington in Seattle after years of being enrolled on-and-off, during which time he held numerous menial jobs. He also attended the Iowa Writers' Workshop at the University of Iowa. As a second-year workshop student, he won Playboy magazine's short story contest for university students for his story "Fishboy."

=== Well ===
McIntosh's debut novel was published in 2003, when he was 26 years old. Well is a series of vignettes about the bleak existence of desperate characters living in the Seattle suburb of Federal Way, Washington. The book earned praise for its realistic characters, stark writing style and for being ambitious. It was both praised and criticized for its structure and unrelated storylines.

=== theMystery.doc ===
McIntosh's second novel, the 1,660-page theMystery.doc, was published by Grove Atlantic on October 3, 2017. He began working on it shortly after Well was published in 2003. It tells the story of an amnesiac writer trying to write an ambitious follow-up novel to a previous work. It contains many subplots, unusual page layouts, styles and fonts, as well as photos. The Washington Post called it "a supersize version of Well" and said that reading it "is like wandering through a gigantic art installation."

== Bibliography ==
=== Novels ===
- Well, New York: Grove Press, 2003
- theMystery.doc, New York: Grove Press, 2017

=== Stories ===
- "Fishboy," Playboy, October 2001 (as Matt McIntosh)
- "Chicken," Ploughshares, Spring 2001
- "Looking Out For Your Own," Puerto del Sol
