= Brandon Hobson =

Cherokee Nation fiction writer

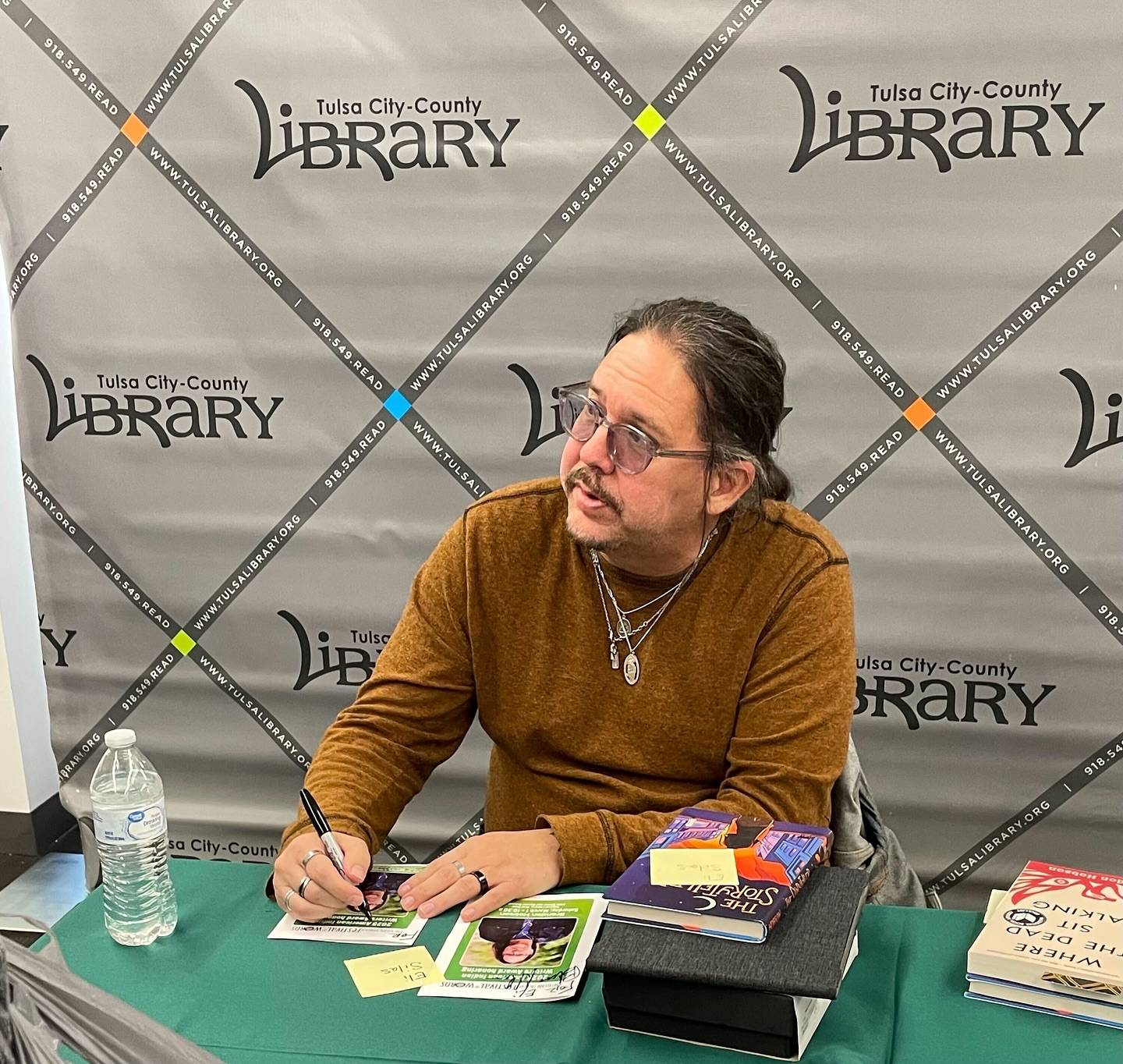
- Hobson at the Tulsa Public Library
- Education: Oklahoma State University Oklahoma City University
- Occupations: writer, professor
- Writing career
- Genre: literary fiction
- Movements: postmodern fiction, postmodern literature, metafiction, postcolonialism

Brandon Hobson is a Cherokee fiction writer primarily known for literary fiction novels. His novel, Where the Dead Sit Talking (2018), was a finalist for the National Book Award for Fiction.

== Career ==
Hobson received his PhD in English from Oklahoma State University and previously taught at New Mexico State University. He is the David A. Burr Endowed Chair of Letters at the University of Oklahoma and also teaches in the low-res MFA program in creative writing at the Institute of American Indian Arts. He is an enrolled citizen of the Cherokee Nation.

In 2022, he was awarded a Guggenheim Fellowship. His fiction has won a Pushcart Prize and has appeared in The Best American Short Stories 2021 ("Escape from the Dysphesiac People"), McSweeney's, Conjunctions, The Believer, NOON, and many other places.

== Honors and awards ==
=== Literary awards ===
- 2016 Pushcart Prize for "Past the Econolodge" in Noon (magazine)
- 2018 National Book Award for Fiction Finalist for Where the Dead Sit Talking
- 2019 Aspen Words Literary Prize Longlisted for Where the Dead Sit Talking
- 2019 Reading the West Award winner in fiction for Where the Dead Sit Talking
- 2019 St. Francis College Literary Prize Finalist for Where the Dead Sit Talking
- 2020 International Dublin Literary Award Longlisted for Where the Dead Sit Talking
- 2022 Western Heritage Award Winner for The Removed
- 2023 Dos Passos Prize Finalist
- 2026 PEN Faulkner Award Longlisted for The Devil is a Southpaw
- 2026 PEN/Jean Stein Book Award Finalist for The Devil is a Southpaw

=== Other ===
- 2022 Guggenheim Fellowship
- 2025 American Indian Writers Award

== Books ==
=== Novels ===
- Deep Ellum, 2014
- Desolation of Avenues Untold, 2015
- Where the Dead Sit Talking, 2018
- The Removed, 2021
- The Devil is a Southpaw, 2025

=== Children's books ===
- The Storyteller, 2023
