= Andrei Monastyrski =

Russian author & poet (born 1949)

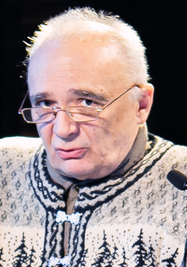
- Born: Andrei Viktorovich Sumnin; October 28, 1949 (age 76); Pechenga, Murmansk Oblast
- Movement: Moscow Conceptualism
- Awards: Andrei Bely Prize, Soratnik Prize, Innovation Prize

Andrei Viktorovich Monastyrski (born Sumnin; October 28, 1949, in Pechenga, Murmansk Oblast, USSR) is an author, poet, artist and art theorist, one of the leaders of the Moscow Conceptualist movement along with Ilya Kabakov.

== Life and work ==
Andrei Sumnin was born in 1949 in the town of Pechenga in Murmansk Oblast.

After graduating in Philology from Lomonosov Moscow State University, he got his first job as an editor in the Moscow Literature Museum. In 1973, he made his first serial structures and minimalist audio compositions, before turning to poetic objects and actions in 1975. One of the founding members of Collective Actions, he initiated most of the group’s projects and documented them in their Trips to the Countryside. Andrei Monastyrski was among the core participants of the Apt Art movement and the Moscow-based Club of Avant-Garde Artists (CLAVA), and has taken part in many exhibitions in Russia and abroad. Several of his articles on the theory of contemporary art have been published by Russian and international journals.

In 2003, he received Andrei Bely Prize for his contribution to Russian literature. He was granted Soratnik Prize in 2008, and Innovation Prize (for Art Theory) the following year.

In 1975–77 he made a series of works under the general name Elementary Poems. This series of books and actions anticipated the aesthetics of Collective Actions, which was formed in 1976.

Since 1980 Andrei Monastyrski has edited a number of volumes documenting Collective Actions’ Trips to the Countryside.

In 1981, he edited the first issue of the Moscow Archive of New Art (MANI). From 1986 to 1990 he coedited four MANI issues with Joseph Backstein and one more with Sabine Hänsgen.

In 2008–2009 he was a member of KAPITON group with Vadim Zakharov and Yuri Leiderman.

In 2011, Andrei Monastyrski and Collective Actions represented Russia at the Venice Biennale.

== Selected solo exhibitions ==
2014 – Carriers, XL Gallery, Moscow

2013 – Andrei Monastyrski, Charim Galerie, Vienna

2012 – Andrei Monastyrski and Collective Actions. Trips out of Town (1980–2006). Regina Gallery, London

2011 – Andrei Monastyrski and Collective Actions. e-flux, New York

2011 – Empty Zones. Andrei Monastyrski and Collective Actions. The 54th International Art Exhibition – la Biennale di Venezia, Russian Pavilion, Venice

2011 – Out of Town: Andrei Monastyrski & Collective Actions. Performa, New York

2010 – Andrei Monastyrski. Moscow Museum of Modern Art. Victoria Foundation – the Art of being Contemporary, Moscow

2008 – Andrei Monastyrski. Kunstihoone, Tallinn

2005 – Ground Works. Stella Art Gallery, Moscow

2000 – The 70s and Other Works. Navicula Artis, Saint Petersburg

1998 – Gosagroprom, Obscuri Viri, Moscow

1998 – The 70s. Feldkirch, Austria

1997 – Branch. XL Gallery, Moscow

== Selected group exhibitions ==
2011 – Ostalgia. New Museum, New York

2007 – The 52nd International Art Exhibition – la Biennale di Venezia, Venice

2007 – documenta 12, Kassel

2003 – The 50th International Art Exhibition – la Biennale di Venezia, Venice

2000 – Art of the 20th Century, Tretyakov Gallery, Moscow

2000 – L'autre moitié de l'Europe, Jeu de Paume, Paris

1999 – Global Conceptualism. Queens Museum of Art, New York

1999 – Kunst im Untergrund, Albertina, Vienna

1998 – Out of Actions, The Museum of Contemporary Art, Los Angeles

1998 — Praprintium, Berlin – Bremen

1997 – Collective Actions, Exit Art, New York

1993 – The 45th International Art Exhibition – la Biennale di Venezia, Venice

Sowjetische Kunst um 1990, Kunsthalle Düsseldorf

1977 – The 38th International Art Exhibition – la Biennale di Venezia, Venice

== Andrei Monastyrski’s Works Are in the Following Collections ==
- Tate Modern, London
- Reina Sofia, Madrid
- The State Tretyakov Gallery, Moscow
- Moscow Museum of Modern Art, Moscow
- National Center for Contemporary Arts, Moscow
- Museum of Contemporary Art in Antwerp
- Centre Georges Pompidou, Paris
- Zimmerli Art Museum at Rutgers University, New Brunswick, NJ
- Museum of Modern Art, New York

== Selected bibliography ==
- Коллективные действия. Поездки за город. т. 4-5 (составитель А. Монастырский), Вологда: БМК, Герман Титов, 2016. 472 стр. [Collective Actions. Trips to the Countryside. Volumes 4-5. Ed. Andrei Monastyrski. Vologda, BMK, German Titov, 2016, 472 pp.] ISBN 978-5-91965-129-1
- Коллективные действия. Поездки за город. т. 1 (составитель А. Монастырский), Вологда: БМК, Герман Титов, 2011. 358 стр. [Collective Actions. Trips to the Countryside. Volume 1. Ed. Andrei Monastyrski. Vologda, BMK, German Titov, 2011, 358 pp.] ISBN 978-5-91967-048-3
- Коллективные действия. Поездки за город. тт. 2-3 (составитель А. Монастырский), Вологда: БМК, Герман Титов, 2011. 624 стр. [Collective Actions. Trips to the Countryside. Volumes 2-3. Ed. Andrei Monastyrski. Vologda, BMK, German Titov, 2011, 624 pp.] ISBN 978-5-91965-044-7
- Сборники МАНИ Составитель и автор предисл. Андрей Монастырский. – Вологда: БМК, Герман Титов, 2010. 672 стр. [MANI Collections. Ed. Andrei Monastyrski. Preface by Andrei Monastyrski. Vologda, BMK, German Titov, 2010, 672 pp.] ISBN 978-5-86402-320-4
- Монастырский А. Поэтический сборник. – Вологда: БМК, Герман Титов, 2010. 336 стр. [Andrei Monastyrski. Poetry. Vologda, BMK, German Titov, 2010, 336 pp.] ISBN 978-5-86402-312-9
- Монастырский А. Эстетические исследования. – Вологда: БМК, Герман Титов, 2009. 562 стр. [Andrei Monastyrski. Writings on Aesthetics. Vologda, BMK, German Titov, 2009, 562 pp.] ISBN 978-5-86402-306-8
- Монастырский А., Панитков Н., Макаревич И., Елагина Е., Ромашко С., Хэнсген С. (Группа «Коллективные действия»). Поездки за город. 6-11 том. — Вологда: БМК, Герман Титов, 2009. 644 стр. [Andrei Monastyrski, Nikolai Panitkov, Igor Makarevich, Elena Elagina, Sergei Romashko and Sabine Hänsgen (Collective Actions). Trips to the Countryside. Volumes 6-11. Vologda, BMK, German Titov, 2009, 644 pp.] ISBN 978-5-86402-300-6
- Поэтический мир / С предуведомлением Д. А. Пригова и послесловием автора. – М.: НЛО, 2007. 336 стр. [The World of Poetry, with a preface by Dmitri Prigov and the author’s afterword. Moscow, NLO, 2007. 336 pp.] ISBN 5-86793-513-2
- Небесному носатому домику по пути в Паган. – М.: ОГИ, 2001. – 88 с. [Writing to the Big-Nosed Sky House on the Way to Bagan. Moscow, OGI, 2001. 88 pp.]
- Монастырский А., Панитков Н., Алексеев Н., Макаревич И., Елагина Е., Кизевальтер Г., Ромашко С., Хэнсген С. (Группа «Коллективные действия»). Поездки за город. — М.: Ad Marginem, 1998. — 784 с. [Andrei Monastyrski, Nikolai Panitkov, Nikita Alexeev, Igor Makarevich, Elena Elagina, George Kiesewalter, Sergei Romashko and Sabine Hänsgen (Collective Actions). Trips to the Countryside. ] ISBN 5-94282-033-3
- Словарь терминов московской концептуальной школы / Составитель и автор предисл. Андрей Монастырский. – М.: Ad Marginem, 1999 [Dictionary of Moscow Conceptualist School. Ed, Andrei Monastyrski, preface by Andrei Monastyrski. Moscow, Ad Marginem Press, 1999]

== Books about Andrei Monastyrski or Collective Actions ==
- Boris Groys. Empty Zones: Andrei Monastyrski and 'Collective Actions'. London: Black Dog Publishing, 2011.
- Collective Actions: Audience Recollections from the first five years, 1976–1981. Translated & edited by Yelena Kalinsky, Soberscove Press, Chicago, 2012
- Octavian Eșanu. Transition in Post-Soviet Art. The Collective Actions Group before and after 1989. Ce UPRESS, Budapest – New York, 2013
- Ekaterina Degot. Andrei Monastyrsky. Moscow: Ad Marginem Press, 2014
- Marina Gerber. Empty Action: Labour and Free Time in the Art of Collective Actions. Transcript-Verlag, 2018

== Family ==
Maria Sumnina (born 1977), daughter, a Russian artist.
