= Mikhail Elizarov =

Russian writer (born 1973)

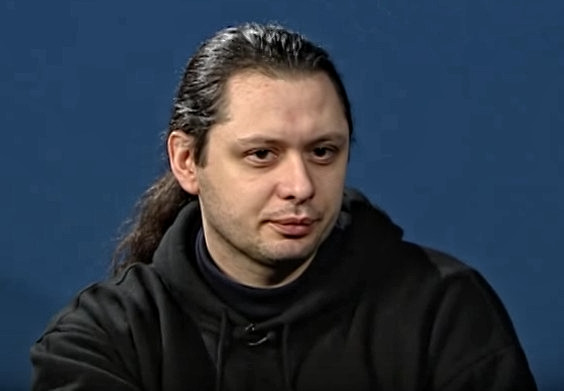
- Mikhail Elizarov in 2012
- Born: Mikhail Yuryevich Elizarov; 28 January 1973 (age 53). Ivano-Frankivsk, USSR
- Occupations: writer, singer-songwriter
- Writing career
- Language: Russian
- Genres: novel, short story, punk-bard-chanson
- Notable works: Fingernails, Pasternak, The Librarian, Cartoons, Earth
- Notable awards: Russian Booker Prize 2008; National Bestseller 2020; Grigoryev Poetry Prize 2020
- Movements: Russian postmodernism, magic realism
- Website: elizarov.club

Mikhail Yuryevich Elizarov (Russian: Михаи́л Ю́рьевич Елизаров; January 28, 1973) is a modern Russian writer and singer-songwriter of Ukrainian descent, laureate of the Russian Booker Prize in 2008 for the novel The Librarian, the National Bestseller Literary Prize in 2020 for Earth and the Grigoryev Poetry Prize in 2020 for The Orc Song.

== Biography ==
Mikhail Yelizarov was born and raised in Ukraine. He graduated from a music school, specializing in vocals. In 1996, he graduated from the Faculty of Philology at Kharkiv State University. Inasmuch as he studied at the university part-time and had no student deferment, he was forced to serve as conscript in the Ukrainian Armed Forces.

From 2001 to 2003, he studied television directing in Hanover. After completing his education, he moved to Berlin, where he lived and worked until 2007. He obtained German citizenship, retaining Ukrainian citizenship.

In 2007, he moved to Moscow. Since 2019, he worked as a researcher at the Modern Algebra and Applications Laboratory at Saint Petersburg State University.

== Literary career ==
In 2001, the Russian publishing house Ad Marginem issued a collection of short novels Fingernails, which immediately captured the attention of the media and critics. The collection includes 24 short stories and a novel of the same title, the main characters of which are two pupils who possess paranormal abilities studying in a boarding school for demented children. The story was shortlisted for the Andrei Bely literary prize. Russian literary critic Lev Danilkin of the Afisha magazine hailed the collection as the best debut of the year.

The next Elizarov's novel Pasternak (2003) prompted controversial polemic among Russian critics. In this anti-liberal and anti-sectarian lampoon, the poet Boris Pasternak is depicted in the form of a demon who "poisons" the intelligentsia's minds with his works. Some critics categorized the book as "trash", "a sickening novel". Literary critic Alla Latynina wrote in Novy Mir, that the novel has "an unpretentious, rather pop culture plot". The Continent magazine, in a review of literary criticism, wrote that "when brown comes into fashion, its fans appear in literary circles", calling the author of NG-Ex libris Lev Pirogov, who spoke favourably of the novel, "a Nazi-minded ideologist". Moreover, the magazine noted that the leitmotif of the criticism was "the crisis of liberal values, the entry into the arena of the enemies of freedom".

On the other hand, the critic Vladimir Bondarenko in Zavtra newspaper praised highly the novel: "This is where the unbridled Russian revenge showed itself in full splendor, as a response to all the humiliations and insults of the Russian nation, the Russian character, the Russian faith and the Russian dream ... Through all a set of avant-garde literary techniques, through the philology of the text and dense erudition of the young writer, not inferior to either Umberto Eco, or Milorad Pavić, the unshakable centuries-old spiritual values of the Russian people are vehemently defended". Lev Danilkin labeled the novel as an "Orthodox philosophical action movie".

In 2007, Elizarov's novel The Librarian was published, which in December 2008 won him the Russian Booker Prize. The protagonist of the novel learns that some books of a forgotten Soviet writer possess mystical properties, and various groups of readers are waging a fierce battle to get them. As was noted by Anna Kuznetsova in the Znamya magazine, "Mikhail Elizarov's prose seems to be evolving like Vladimir Sorokin's: from scandalous shockingness to fiction rich in intellectual content". In 2015 the novel was translated to English by Andrew Bromfield and issued in Pushkin Press, London. Jeff VanderMeer highly praised the novel as "immensely entertaining" and compared it to works of Nikolai Gogol and Mikhail Bulgakov, "while being very much its own thing". A television adaptation came out in 2023.

In 2011, the novel Cartoons became the finalist of the award National Bestseller.

In 2014, Elizarov won the NOS Prize in the nomination "Audience Choice Award" with the collection of short stories named We went out to smoke for 17 years. Mikhail Elizarov says, that "if we assume that the writer has two ink tanks on his desk with different kind of inks, then this book, unlike all my previous ones, is written entirely with the contents of the second ink tank. It has never happened to me before. A distinctive feature of this "second ink" is fiction. There is not a word of truth in this book". Nevertheless, the short stories in this collection are written in rather autobiographical, true-to-life style, uncharacteristic of all his previous books.

After almost six years of "silence", Mikhail Elizarov published a new book in October 2019. Titled Earth, the new novel is the first large-scale reflection on the "Russian Thanatos". As the Russian writer and critic Andrey Astvatsaturov notes in his review, "Elizarov seems to have written his best novel so far. Inspirational and at the same time masterful, mature, measured and carefully thought out from the first to the last paragraph. Despite the huge array of text, this book is only the first part of the novel Earth, titled The Digger". The plot unfolds itself around the protagonist who works in the funeral business in modern Russia and meets a mysterious young lady covered in tattoos.

Russian literary critic Viktor Toporov characterizes Elizarov as one of only two or three contemporary visionary writers of Russian literature (along with Vladimir Sharov and Sasha Sokolov)

== Musical career ==
In parallel to his literary activities, Mikhail Elizarov also performs songs of his own composition since 2010.

As of 2026, Elizarov's discography consists of thirteen albums.

== Political views ==
In 2007, Elizarov, shortly before that obtained German citizenship and moved to Moscow, stated that he realized only after some years of residence in Europe that the Western world was always Russia’s enemy, constantly waging an information and cultural war against Russian state and Russian nation. He expressed the view that true democracy did not exist in Europe and that all real power was held by elites who manipulated public opinion through mainstream media. He saw the immense pressure exerted on Russia and the biased way Western mass media presented information as self-evident facts. He also argued that Russians who emigrated to Europe were doomed to a dismal existence, and that the few who did succeed in the West do so by, to some extent, selling out their country — since a "bad" Russia is sold well, whereas a "good" Russia is not sold at all.

There are good, interesting people in Europe, but when they come together, they turn into a system. And for some reason, that system is hostile to Russia.

— Mikhail Elizarov

Elizarov supported the Donbass militias in 2014 and was negative about Ukrainian politicians. He expressed the view that, following the collapse of the Soviet Union, the West actively instilled anti-Russian, anti-Soviet, and anti-Orthodox ideology in the minds of the Ukrainian people, and that the events of 2014 brought to power in Ukraine forces that were not merely pro-Western but specifically anti-Russian, and whose objective was to sacrifice Ukraine as a pawn in an undeclared war against Russia.

Since February 2022, he has maintained a public silence about the Russo-Ukrainian war and maintained a distance from the Z-media.

== Literary works ==
- Prose / Проза (novel, short stories) / Kharkov: "Torsing", 2000, ISBN 966-7661-35-0
- Fingernails / Ногти (novel, short stories) / Moscow: Ad Marginem, 2001, ISBN 5-93321-023-4
- Pasternak (novel) / Moscow: Ad Marginem, 2003, ISBN 5-93321-062-5
- Red film / Красная плёнка (short stories) / Moscow: Ad Marginem, 2005, ISBN 5-93321-107-9
- The Librarian / Библиотекарь (novel) / Moscow: Ad Marginem, 2007, ISBN 978-5-91103-006-3
- Blocks / Кубики (short stories) / Moscow: Ad Marginem, 2008, ISBN 978-5-91103-037-7
- Cartoons / Мультики (novel) / Moscow: AST, 2010, ISBN 978-5-17-065809-1
- Burattini, The Fascism has passed / Бураттини. Фашизм прошёл (essays) / Moscow: AST, 2011, ISBN 978-5-17-074598-2, 978-5-271-36619-2
- We went out to smoke for 17 years... / Мы вышли покурить на 17 лет… (short stories) / Moscow: Astel, 2012, ISBN 978-5-271-45074-7
- Earth / Земля (novel) / Moscow: AST, 2019, ISBN 978-5-17-118544-2
- Udol / Юдоль (novel) / Moscow: AST, 2025

== Awards ==
- Russian Booker Prize (2008) for the novel The Librarian.
- Short-list of the Andrei Bely Prize (2001), Fingernails.
- Finalist of the National Bestseller award (2011), Cartoons.
- "Audience Choice Award" NOS Prize (2014), for the collection of short-stories We went out to smoke for 17 years.
- Winner of the National Bestseller award (2020), Earth.
- Grigoryev Poetry Prize (2020) for The Orc Song.

== Translations ==
- Mikhail Elizarov The Librarian / translated to English by Andrew Bromfield // Published by Pushkin Press, London, February 10, 2015 | 416 Pages | ISBN 9781782270270
- Michail Jelizarow "Die Nägel" / translated to German by Hannelore Umbreit // Leipzig: "Reclam", 2003, 128 Seiten, ISBN 3-379-00803-6, ISBN 978-3-379-00803-7
- Mikhail Elizarov "Le Bibliothécaire" / translated to French by Françoise Mancip-Renaudie // Paris: "Calmann-Lévy", 2010, 384 p., ISBN 2-7021-4130-7, ISBN 978-2-7021-4130-4
- Mikhail Jelizarov "Neglene" / translated to Danish by Jon Kyst // København: "Forlaget Vandkunsten", 2010, 120 sider, ISBN 87-7695-195-2, ISBN 978-87-7695-195-5
- Michail Elizarov "Il bibliotecario" / translated to Italian by S. Guagnelli // Roma: "Atmosphere libri", 2011, 436 p., ISBN 88-6564-011-1, ISBN 978-88-6564-011-1
- Mihail Jelizarov "Knjiga mudrosti" / translated to Serbian by Vesna Kecman // Beograd : "Alnari", 2012, 320, [1] с. ISBN 978-86-7710-859-5
- Michail Elizarov "Cartoni" / translated to Italian by Giulia Marcucci // Roma: Atmosphere libri, 2012, 238, (Biblioteca del fuoco) ISBN 978-88-6564-036-4.
- Mihhail Jelizarov "Raamatuhoidja" (The Librarian) / translated to Estonian by Veronika Einberg // Tallinn: Varrak, 2012, 359 ISBN 978-9985-3-2470-7.

== Discography ==
- 2010 — Notebook / Notebook
- 2011 — It makes me mad / Зла не хватает
- 2011 — About the goat / Про козла
- 2012 — I'll post / Запощу
- 2012 — We went out to smoke for 17 years / Мы вышли покурить на 17 лет
- 2013 — The house and paints / Дом и краски
- 2014 — Book of complaints / Жалобная книга
- 2015 — Ragnarök / Рагнарёк
- 2017 — In bright phuck / В светлом ахуе
- 2018 — Soldier's grunge / Солдатский гранж
- 2020 — Sectarian album / Сектантский альбом
- 2024 - Mister chief wind / Господин главный ветер
- 2026 - In the blue expanse / В синей вышине
