= Lakota Nation vs. United States =

2022 documentary film

Lakota Nation vs. United States is a 2022 documentary film which explores the 1876 Seizure of the Black Hills and the Indigenous Lakota people's fight to reclaim control of them. It was directed by Jesse Short Bull and Laura Tomaselli and Executive Produced by Mark Ruffalo.

== Critical reception ==
Lakota Nation vs. United States received positive reviews from film critics. It holds a "fresh" approval rating of 100% on review aggregator website Rotten Tomatoes, based on 23 critic reviews. On Metacritic, the film holds a rating of 85 out of 100, based on 8 critics, indicating "universal acclaim". It won the 2024 News and Documentary Emmy Awards for Best Documentary and Outstanding Direction: Documentary for Jesse Short Bull. Film also won Cinema for Peace Dove for Justice.
