= Ardis Publishing =

Publishing house dedicated in making Russian literature and English literature

- Parent company: The Overlook Press
- Founded: 1971
- Founder: Carl R. Proffer and Ellendea C. Proffer
- Country of origin: United States
- Headquarters location: New York City
- Publication types: Books
- Official website: www.overlookpress.com/ardis.html

Ardis Publishing (until 2002, Ardis Publishers) began in 1971, as the only publishing house outside of Russia dedicated to Russian literature in both English and Russian, Ardis was founded in Ann Arbor, Michigan, United States, by husband and wife scholars Carl R. Proffer and Ellendea C. Proffer. The Proffers had two goals for Ardis: one was to publish in Russian the "lost library" of twentieth-century Russian literature which had been censored and removed from Soviet libraries (Bulgakov, Mandelstam, Tsvetaeva, Nabokov, among others); the other was to bring translations of contemporary writers working in the Soviet Union to the West. Ardis has published around 400 titles, roughly half in English, half in Russian.

Ardis became important in the Soviet Union, and then acclaimed in the new Russia, because it published, in Russian, many works which could not be published there until the dawn of Glasnost. Such authors as Nabokov, Sokolov, Brodsky, Bitov, Iskander, Aksyonov and many others published in Russian with Ardis, and the books were smuggled back into the Soviet Union. Besides publishing new translations of the classics as well as academic guides, notable publications such as the Russian Literature Triquarterly, and all but one of the main books of poetry by Brodsky, Carl Proffer facilitated Brodsky's coming to the United States, by assuring him of a job at the University of Michigan.

In English, among many other titles, Ardis published the complete letters of Dostoevsky, major prose collections of Platonov, Remizov, Mandelstam and Tsvetaeva, and the first annotated translation of Bulgakov's The Master and Margarita, as well as major histories of eighteenth-century literature and the most inclusive anthology of Romantic literature. Translations of Bulgakov's major plays were also published by the Proffers, with Indiana University Press (rights have now reverted to Ellendea Proffer). The range of titles was very broad, ranging from Nabokov's translation of A Hero of our Time to Razgon's memoirs of the camps.

A professor at the University of Michigan, Carl Proffer died in 1984 of colon cancer at age 46. His wife Ellendea continued publishing and was awarded a MacArthur Fellowship in 1989.

The name Ardis comes from the novel Ada or Ardor: A Family Chronicle by Vladimir Nabokov. See: Ardis 25 years of Russian Literature, catalog for exhibit at the Library of Foreign literature, Moscow, May 28, 1996.

Some, but not all of Ardis's English-language titles were sold to The Overlook Press in 2002, which has begun reprinting selected titles of the Ardis back catalog. Ardis Publishing is an imprint owned by an American independent publisher Overlook Press. It should be mentioned that Overlook Press purchased only the rights to certain English-language titles, as well as the English-language name of Ardis Publishers. Ardis at Overlook specializes in English translations of Russian literature, and has so far reprinted 26 of the original Ardis titles.

The archive of the original Ardis Publishers is now housed at the Special Collections Library of the University of Michigan.
