= John Hawkes (novelist) =

American novelist

- Born: John Clendennin Talbot Burne Hawkes, Jr. August 17, 1925; Stamford, Connecticut, U.S.
- Died: May 15, 1998 (aged 72); Providence, Rhode Island, U.S.
- Education: Harvard College
- Occupation: Novelist
- Writing career
- Period: 1949–1997
- Genres: Avant-garde; Experimental literature
- Notable works: The Cannibal; The Lime Twig
- Literary movement: Postmodernism

John Clendennin Talbot Burne Hawkes Jr. (August 17, 1925 – May 15, 1998) was a postmodern American novelist, known for the intensity of his work, which suspended some traditional constraints of narrative fiction.

== Biography ==
Born in Stamford, Connecticut, Hawkes was educated at Harvard College, where fellow students included John Ashbery, Frank O'Hara, and Robert Creeley. Although he published his first novel, The Cannibal, in 1949, it was The Lime Twig (1961) that first won him acclaim. Thomas Pynchon is said to have admired the novel. His second novel, The Beetle Leg (1951), an intensely surrealistic Western set in a Montana landscape, came to be viewed by many critics as one of the landmark novels of 20th-century American literature.

Hawkes took inspiration from Vladimir Nabokov and considered himself a follower of the Russian-American translingual author. Nabokov's story "Signs and Symbols" was on the reading list for Hawkes' writing students at Brown University. "A writer who truly and greatly sustains us is Vladimir Nabokov," Hawkes stated in a 1964 interview.

Hawkes taught English at Harvard from 1955 to 1958 and English and creative writing at Brown University from 1958 until his retirement in 1988. Among his students at Harvard and Brown were Rick Moody, Jeffrey Eugenides, David Shields, Christine Lehner Hewitt, Jade D Benson/Denice Joan Deitch, Alex Londres, William Melvin Kelley, Marilynne Robinson, Ross McElwee, and Maxim D. Shrayer.

Hawkes died in Providence, Rhode Island; his papers are housed at Brown University.

== Quotations ==
- "For me, everything depends on language."
- "I began to write fiction on the assumption that the true enemies of the novel were plot, character, setting and theme, and having once abandoned these familiar ways of thinking about fiction, totality of vision or structure was really all that remained."
- "Like the poem, the experimental fiction is an exclamation of psychic materials which come to the writer all readily distorted, prefigured in that inner schism between the rational and the absurd."
- "Everything I have written comes out of nightmare, out of the nightmare of war, I think."
- "The writer should always serve as his own angleworm—and the sharper the barb with which he fishes himself out of blackness, the better."

== Awards and nominations ==
- 1962 - American Academy of Arts and Letters Academy Award.
- 1965 - National Book Award nomination for Second Skin
- 1973 - Prix du Meilleur Livre étranger for The Blood Oranges
- 1986 - Prix Médicis Étranger for Adventures in the Alaskan Skin Trade
- 1990 - Lannan Literary Award.

== Works ==
- Charivari (1949)
- The Cannibal (1949)
- The Beetle Leg (1951)
- The Goose on the Grave (1954)
- The Owl (1954)
- The Lime Twig (1961)
- Second Skin (1964)
- The Innocent Party (plays) (1966)
- Lunar Landscapes (short stories) (1969)
- The Blood Oranges (1970)
- Death, Sleep, and the Traveler (1974)
- Travesty (1976)
- The Passion Artist (1979)
- Virginie: Her Two Lives (1982)
- Humors of Blood & Skin: a John Hawkes reader (1984)
- Adventures in the Alaskan Skin Trade (1985)
- Innocence in Extremis (1985)
- Whistlejacket (1988)
- Sweet William (1993)
- The Frog (1996)
- An Irish Eye (1997)
