= Sasha Sokolov =

Canadian-Soviet writer

- Александр Всеволодович Соколов
- Born: Alexander Vsevolodovitch Sokolov; November 6, 1943; Ottawa, Ontario, Canada
- Citizenship: Canada; USSR
- Occupations: prose writer, novelist
- Writing career
- Pen name: Sasha Sokolov
- Notable work: A School for Fools
- Notable awards: Pushkin Prize; Andrei Bely Prize
- Movement: Postmodernism

Sasha Sokolov (Russian: Александр Всеволодович Соколов, romanized: Alexander Vsevolodovitch Sokolov; born November 6, 1943, in Ottawa, Ontario, Canada) is a writer of Russian literature.

He became known worldwide in the 1970s after his first novel, A School for Fools was published in translation by Ardis Publishers (Ann Arbor, Michigan) in the US, and was later reissued by Four Walls Eight Windows. He is acclaimed for his unorthodox use of language, and for his play with rhythms, sounds and word-associations. The author himself coined the term "proeziya" for his work—in between prose and poetry (an English analog for the term could be "proetry").

== Biography ==
Sokolov is a Canadian citizen and has lived the larger part of his life in the United States and Canada. During the Second World War, his father, Major Vsevolod Sokolov, worked at the Soviet embassy in Canada. In 1946 Major Sokolov (agent "Davey") was deported from Canada accused of spying. After returning to the Soviet Union in 1946 and growing up there, Sokolov did not fit into the Soviet system. In 1965 he was discarded from a military translator's institute. After that he studied journalism at Moscow State University from 1966 to 1971.

Sokolov made several attempts to flee the Soviet Union. He was caught while crossing the Iranian border, and only his father's connections helped him to avoid a long imprisonment.

In Austria, he worked as a lumberjack in the Vienna Woods. In September 1976, shortly after «A School for Fools» was published by the American publishing house Ardis, he moved to the United States. He lived in Ann Arbor in the home of Carl and Ellendea Proffer, the owners of «Ardis»^{10 фактов о Саше Соколове, которые вы не узнаете из фильма: Встреча с Борхесом, работа в морге и премия за рассказ о слепых / 10 facts about Sasha Sokolov that you won’t learn from the film: a meeting with Borges, a job at the morgue, and an award for a story about the blind}.

He obtained Canadian citizenship in 1977.

His second, a postmodern novel, «Between Dog and Wolf», depends even more on the particularities of the Russian language, and it was deemed untranslatable for many years. It has therefore enjoyed far less success than A School for Fools, which has been translated into many languages. However, in late 2016, Between Dog and Wolf was translated into English by Alexander Boguslawski, a longtime friend of Mr. Sokolov, and was published by Columbia University Press.

Sokolov's 1985 novel Palisandriya was translated as Astrophobia and published by Grove Press in the US in 1989. The complete manuscript of his fourth book is said to have been lost when the Greek house where it was written burnt down. Sokolov, who leads a rather reclusive life, says that he keeps writing, but doesn't want to be published any more.

In 2016, Sasha Sokolov's novel "Between a Dog and a Wolf" was translated into English by Alexander Boguslavsky, a Slavic professor from Florida and a longtime friend of the author, and published by Columbia University Press.

For the past few decades, Sasha Sokolov has lived in his own home in Canada with his third wife, the athlete Marlene Royle; as he suffers from a fear of flying, he travels the world with her by water, rail, and road.

He lectured at universities in the United States and Canada and worked as a ski instructor in Vermont.

Reissue of books in Russian: The total number of Russian-language reissues of Sasha Sokolov’s books exceeds 40 titles, and their combined print run totals more than 300,000 copies.

According to media reports, Sasha Sokolov was nominated for the Nobel Prize in Literature in 2020.

== Major works ==
- Школа для дураков (1976). A School for Fools, trans. Carl R. Proffer (Ardis, 1977); later trans. by Alexander Boguslawski (New York Review Books, 2015)
- Между собакой и волком (1980). Between Dog and Wolf, trans. Alexander Boguslawski (Columbia University Press, 2017)
- Палисандрия [Palisandriia] (1985). Astrophobia, trans. Michael Henry Heim (Grove, 1989)
- In the House of the Hanged: Essays and Vers Libres, trans. Alexander Boguslawski (University of Toronto Press, 2012)

== Literature ==
- Johnson, D. Barton (1987) "Sasha Sokolov: A Literary Biography", Canadian-American Slavic Studies, 21, Nos 3-4: 203-230.
- Johnson, D. Barton, Introduction for Sasha Sokolov's "School for Fools" by D. Barton Johnson from the University of California
- Kolb, Hanna (2000). "The Dissolution of Reality in Sasha Sokolov's Mezhdu sobakoi i volkom". In McMillin, Arnold (ed.). Reconstructing the Canon: Russian Writing in the 1980s. Studies in Russian and European literature, 3. Amsterdam: Harwood Academic Pub. pp. 193–224. ISBN 90-5702-593-0.
- Lotus, Ludmilla L. "Sasha Sokolov's Journey from "Samizdat" to Russia's Favorite Classic: 1976-2006", Canadian-American Slavic Studies, 40, part I, Nos 2-4, 2006: 393-424.
- _____ with D. Barton Johnson, compilers. "Sasha Sokolov: A Selected Annotated Bibliography*. 1967-2006, Canadian-American Slavic Studies, 40, part I, Nos 2-4, 2006: 425-94.
- Simmons, Cynthia. Their father's voice. Vassily Aksyonov, Venedikt Erofeev, Eduard Limonov, and Sasha Sokolov. Lang, New York u.a. 1993, ISBN 0-8204-2160-X

== External links and references ==
- Literary Encyclopedia: Sasha Sokolov
- Sokolov's page on his Literary Agent's website
- Introduction for Sasha Sokolov's "School for Fools" by D. Barton Johnson from the University of California
- ELKOST Intl. Sasha Sokolov
- The Agony Of the Exiles. Russian Writers Convene in L.A
- Sasha Sokolov: Media reviews
