= The Lime Twig =

Book by John Hawkes

- First edition
- Author: John Hawkes
- Language: English
- Genre: Postmodern literature
- Publisher: New Directions Publishing
- Publication date: 1961
- Publication place: United States
- Media type: Print (Paperback)
- Pages: 192

The Lime Twig is a 1961 experimental novel by American writer John Hawkes.

== Plot ==
In England after World War II, a sedate, bored lower-class couple—Michael and Margaret Banks—are lured into fronting a racehorse scheme. Michael is befriended by William Hencher, a well-meaning but lost soul who fell into association with a ruthless gang during the war. After his mother's death, Hencher wants to repay the Bankses for their allowing him to rent a room in their home, where he had lived with his mother for twenty years. Knowing Michael likes horses, Hencher invites him to the heist of the racehorse Rock Castle—which goes awry, leading to Hencher's death. The gang members then keep Michael under wraps. Realizing that Margaret is becoming suspicious of Michael's absence, they force Michael to call and tell her to meet him at a party. In order to ensure that Michael will front as the owner of the stolen stallion, they kidnap Margaret while distracting Michael with two women, both sexual predators. The heavy of the gang, Thick, beats Margaret mercilessly with a truncheon after she attempts to escape; Larry, the kingpin of the gang, slashes and rapes her. Meanwhile, Michael finds pleasure in a femme fatale, Sybilline, the mistress of Larry—as well as two other women. Badly beaten in a street fight with a constable, Michael attempts to redeem himself from both criminal activity and infidelity by thwarting the race, which has been set up in order to allow Larry to retire to America in comfort.

== Style and structure ==
The work is told in a framed narrative, with the commentary of the sports writer Sidney Slyter prefacing each chapter (at the request of Hawkes' publisher New Directions, who feared that the novella would be too confusing otherwise). Hencher narrates the first chapter, which concerns his recollections of life with his mother during World War II. The other chapters are all presented in a third-person limited style with a focus on the banal inner lives of Michael and Margaret Banks. The style is one of broken, dreamlike sequences, which suspend time in a quintessentially postmodern fashion. The novella's accumulation of events acts as wish fulfillment run amok for Michael and Margaret, both of whom become helplessly entrapped in fantasies that turn into nightmares. Hawkes underscores the theme of entrapment imagistically, with fleeting references to a sparrow attacked by a hive of bees, a wasp trapped between panes of glass, and so on. The title of the novel itself refers to the old practice of catching birds by spreading lime on a twig, the master trope of the narrative.

Influential American literary critic Leslie Fiedler contributed a preface, arguing for Hawkes' greatness: "For the sake of art and the truth, [Hawkes] dissolves the rational universe which we are driven, for the sake of sanity and peace, to manufacture out of the chaos of memory, impression, reflex and fantasy." Southern writer Flannery O'Connor (a friend of Hawkes) praised the novel as well, commenting in a letter that "You suffer The Lime Twig like a dream. It seems to be something that is happening to you, that you want to escape from but can't."
