= Postmodern literature =

20th-century literary form and movement

Postmodern literature is a genre of fiction characterized by: the use of metafiction, unreliable narration, self-reference, and intertextuality (literature building upon or reimagining other literature); tones of paranoia or ironic or black comedy; and themes of historical or current political significance. As a style of experimental literature, it emerged strongly in the United States in the 1960s through the writings of authors such as Kurt Vonnegut, Thomas Pynchon, William Gaddis, Philip K. Dick, Kathy Acker, and John Barth. Beginning within or alongside the counterculture of the 1960s, postmodernists often challenge authorities and the status quo. This inspiration is, among other things, seen through how postmodern literature is highly self-reflexive about the political issues it speaks to.

Precursors to postmodern literature include Miguel de Cervantes' Don Quixote (1605–1615), Laurence Sterne's Tristram Shandy (1760–1767), James Hogg's Private Memoirs and Confessions of a Justified Sinner (1824), Thomas Carlyle's Sartor Resartus (1833–1834), and Jack Kerouac's On the Road (1957), but postmodern literature was particularly prominent in the 1960s and 1970s. In the 21st century, American literature still features a strong current of postmodern writing, like the postironic Dave Eggers' A Heartbreaking Work of Staggering Genius (2000) and Jennifer Egan's A Visit from the Goon Squad (2010). These works also further develop the postmodern form.

Sometimes the term "postmodernism" is used to discuss many different things ranging from architecture to historical theory to philosophy and film. Because of this fact, several people distinguish between several forms of postmodernism and thus suggest that there are three forms of postmodernism: (1) Postmodernity is understood as a historical period from the mid-1960s to the present, which is different from the (2) theoretical postmodernism, which encompasses the theories developed by thinkers such as Roland Barthes, Jacques Derrida, Michel Foucault and others, and (3) "cultural postmodernism", which includes film, literature, visual arts, etc. that feature postmodern elements. Postmodern literature is, in this sense, part of cultural postmodernism.

== Background ==
=== Notable influences ===
Late 19th and early 20th century playwrights whose work influenced the aesthetics of postmodernism include August Strindberg, Luigi Pirandello, and Bertolt Brecht. Another precursor to postmodernism was Dadaism, which challenged the authority of the artist and highlighted elements of chance, whim, parody, and irony. Tristan Tzara claimed in "How to Make a Dadaist Poem" that to create a Dadaist poem one had only to put random words in a hat and pull them out one by one. Another way Dadaism influenced postmodern literature was in the development of collage, specifically collages using elements from advertisement or illustrations from popular novels (the collages of Max Ernst, for example). Artists associated with Surrealism, which developed from Dadaism, continued experimentations with chance and parody while celebrating the flow of the subconscious mind. André Breton, the founder of Surrealism, suggested that automatism and the description of dreams should play a greater role in the creation of literature. He used automatism to create his novel Nadja and used photographs to replace description as a parody of the overly-descriptive novelists he often criticized. Surrealist René Magritte's experiments with signification are used as examples by Jacques Derrida and Michel Foucault. Foucault also uses examples from Jorge Luis Borges, an important direct influence on many postmodernist fiction writers. He is occasionally listed as a postmodernist, although he started writing in the 1920s. The influence of his experiments with metafiction and magic realism was not fully realized in the Anglo-American world until the postmodern period. Ultimately, this is seen as the highest stratification of criticism among scholars.

Other early 20th-century novels such as Raymond Roussel's Impressions d'Afrique (1910) and Locus Solus (1914), and Giorgio de Chirico's Hebdomeros (1929) have also been identified as important "postmodern precursor[s]".

=== Comparisons with modernist literature ===
Postmodern literature represents a break from the 19th century realism. In character development, both modern and postmodern literature explore subjectivism, turning from external reality to examine inner states of consciousness, in many cases drawing on modernist examples in the "stream of consciousness" styles of James Joyce and Virginia Woolf, or explorative poems like The Waste Land by T. S. Eliot. In addition, both modern and postmodern literature explore fragmentariness in narrative- and character-construction. The Waste Land is often cited as a means of distinguishing modern and postmodern literature. The poem is fragmentary and employs pastiche like much postmodern literature, but the speaker in The Waste Land says, "these fragments I have shored against my ruins". Modernist literature sees fragmentation and extreme subjectivity as an existential crisis, or Freudian internal conflict, a problem that must be solved, and the artist is often cited as the one to solve it. Postmodernists, however, often demonstrate that this chaos is insurmountable; the artist is impotent, and the only recourse against "ruin" is to play within the chaos. Playfulness is present in many modernist works (Joyce's Finnegans Wake or Woolf's Orlando, for example) and they may seem very similar to postmodern works, but with postmodernism playfulness becomes central and the actual achievement of order and meaning becomes unlikely. Gertrude Stein's playful experiment with metafiction and genre in The Autobiography of Alice B. Toklas (1933) has been interpreted as postmodern.

=== Shift to postmodernism ===
As with all stylistic eras, no definite dates exist for the rise and fall of postmodernism's popularity. 1941, the year in which Irish novelist James Joyce and English novelist Virginia Woolf both died, is sometimes used as a rough boundary for postmodernism's start. Irish novelist Flann O'Brien completed The Third Policeman in 1939. It was rejected for publication and remained supposedly lost until published posthumously in 1967. A revised version called The Dalkey Archive was published before the original in 1964, two years before O'Brien died. Notwithstanding its dilatory appearance, the literary theorist Keith Hopper regards The Third Policeman as one of the first of that genre they call the postmodern novel.

The prefix "post", however, does not necessarily imply a new era. Rather, it could also indicate a reaction against modernism in the wake of the Second World War (with its disrespect for human rights, just confirmed in the Geneva Convention, through the rape of Nanjing, the Bataan Death March, the atomic bombings of Hiroshima and Nagasaki, the Holocaust, the bombing of Dresden, the Katyn massacre, the fire-bombing of Tokyo, and Japanese American internment). It could also imply a reaction to significant post-war events: the beginning of the Cold War, the Civil Rights Movement, postcolonialism (Postcolonial literature), and the rise of the personal computer (Cyberpunk and Hypertext fiction).

Some further argue that the beginning of postmodern literature could be marked by significant publications or literary events. For example, some mark the beginning of postmodernism with the first publication of John Hawkes' The Cannibal in 1949, the first performance of En attendant Godot in 1953 (Waiting for Godot, 1955), the first publication of Howl in 1956 or of Naked Lunch in 1959. For others the beginning is marked by moments in critical theory: Jacques Derrida's "Structure, Sign, and Play" lecture in 1966 or as late as Ihab Hassan's usage in The Dismemberment of Orpheus in 1971. Brian McHale details his main thesis on this shift, although many postmodern works have developed out of modernism, modernism is characterised by an epistemological dominant while postmodern works are primarily concerned with questions of ontology.

=== Post-war developments and transition figures ===
Though postmodernist literature does not include everything written in the postmodern period, several post-war developments in literature (such as the Theatre of the Absurd, the Beat Generation, and magic realism) have significant similarities. These developments are occasionally collectively labeled "postmodern"; more commonly, some key figures (Samuel Beckett, William S. Burroughs, Jorge Luis Borges, Julio Cortázar and Gabriel García Márquez) are cited as significant contributors to the postmodern aesthetic.

The work of Alfred Jarry, the Surrealists, Antonin Artaud, Luigi Pirandello and so on also influenced the work of playwrights from the Theatre of the Absurd. The term "Theatre of the Absurd" was coined by Martin Esslin to describe a tendency in theatre in the 1950s; he related it to Albert Camus's concept of the absurd. The plays of the Theatre of the Absurd parallel postmodern fiction in many ways. For example, The Bald Soprano by Eugène Ionesco is essentially a series of clichés taken from a language textbook. One of the most important figures to be categorized as both Absurdist and Postmodern is Samuel Beckett. The work of Beckett is often seen as marking the shift from modernism to postmodernism in literature. He had close ties with modernism because of his friendship with James Joyce; however, his work helped shape the development of literature away from modernism. Joyce, one of the exemplars of modernism, celebrated the possibility of language; Beckett had a revelation in 1945 that, in order to escape the shadow of Joyce, he must focus on the poverty of language and man as a failure. His later work, likewise, featured characters stuck in inescapable situations attempting impotently to communicate whose only recourse is to play, to make the best of what they have. As Hans-Peter Wagner says:

Mostly concerned with what he saw as impossibilities in fiction (identity of characters; reliable consciousness; the reliability of language itself; and the rubrication of literature in genres) Beckett's experiments with narrative form and with the disintegration of narration and character in fiction and drama won him the Nobel Prize for Literature in 1969. His works published after 1969 are mostly meta-literary attempts that must be read in light of his own theories and previous works and the attempt to deconstruct literary forms and genres. ... Beckett's last text published during his lifetime, Stirrings Still (1988), breaks down the barriers between drama, fiction, and poetry, with texts of the collection being almost entirely composed of echoes and reiterations of his previous work ... He was definitely one of the fathers of the postmodern movement in fiction which has continued undermining the ideas of logical coherence in narration, formal plot, regular time sequence, and psychologically explained characters.

The "Beat Generation" was the youth of America during the materialistic 1950s; Jack Kerouac, who coined the term, developed ideas of automatism into what he called "spontaneous prose" to create a maximalistic, multi-novel epic called the Duluoz Legend in the mold of Marcel Proust's In Search of Lost Time. More broadly, "Beat Generation" often includes several groups of post-war American writers from the Black Mountain poets, the New York School, the San Francisco Renaissance, and so on. These writers have occasionally also been referred to as the "Postmoderns" (see especially references by Charles Olson and the Grove anthologies edited by Donald Allen). Though this is now a less common usage of "postmodern", references to these writers as "postmodernists" still appear and many writers associated with this group (John Ashbery, Richard Brautigan, Gilbert Sorrentino, and so on) appear often on lists of postmodern writers. One writer associated with the Beat Generation who appears most often on lists of postmodern writers is William S. Burroughs. Burroughs published Naked Lunch in Paris in 1959 and in America in 1961; this is considered by some the first truly postmodern novel because it is fragmentary, with no central narrative arc; it employs pastiche to fold in elements from popular genres such as detective fiction and science fiction; it's full of parody, paradox, and playfulness; and, according to some accounts, friends Kerouac and Allen Ginsberg edited the book guided by chance. He is also noted, along with Brion Gysin, for the creation of the "cut-up" technique, a technique (similar to Tzara's "Dadaist Poem") in which words and phrases are cut from a newspaper or other publication and rearranged to form a new message. This is the technique he used to create novels such as Nova Express and The Ticket That Exploded.

Magic realism is a style popular among Latin American writers (and can also be considered its own genre) in which supernatural elements are treated as mundane (a famous example being the practical-minded and ultimately dismissive treatment of an apparently angelic figure in Gabriel García Márquez's "A Very Old Man with Enormous Wings"). Though the technique has its roots in traditional storytelling, it was a center piece of the Latin American "boom", a movement coterminous with postmodernism. Some of the major figures of the "Boom" and practitioners of Magic Realism (Gabriel García Márquez, Julio Cortázar etc.) are sometimes listed as postmodernists. This labeling, however, is not without its problems. In Spanish-speaking Latin America, modernismo and posmodernismo refer to early 20th-century literary movements that have no direct relationship to modernism and postmodernism in English. Finding it anachronistic, Octavio Paz has argued that postmodernism is an imported grand récit that is incompatible with the cultural production of Latin America.

Along with Beckett and Borges, a commonly cited transitional figure is Vladimir Nabokov; like Beckett and Borges, Nabokov started publishing before the beginning of postmodernity (1926 in Russian, 1941 in English). Though his most famous novel, Lolita (1955), could be considered a modernist or a postmodernist novel, his later work (specifically Pale Fire in 1962 and Ada or Ardor: A Family Chronicle in 1969) are more clearly postmodern.

=== Scope ===
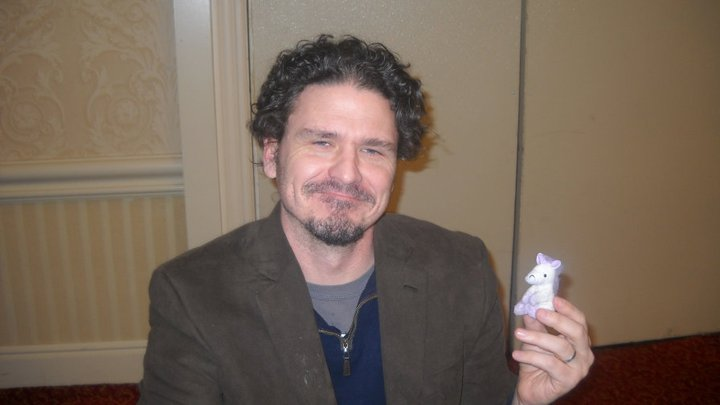
American author and publisher Dave Eggers is one of several contemporary authors who represent the latest movement in post-modern literature which some have deemed post-postmodernism or post-irony.

Some of the earliest examples of postmodern literature are from the 1950s: William Gaddis' The Recognitions (1955), Vladimir Nabokov's Lolita (1955), and William Burroughs' Naked Lunch (1959). It then rose to prominence in the 1960s and 1970s with the publication of Joseph Heller's Catch-22 in 1961, John Barth's Lost in the Funhouse in 1968, Kurt Vonnegut's Slaughterhouse-Five in 1969, and many others. Thomas Pynchon's 1973 novel Gravity's Rainbow is "often considered as the postmodern novel, redefining both postmodernism and the novel in general."

The 1980s, however, also saw several key works of postmodern literature. Don DeLillo's White Noise, Paul Auster's New York Trilogy and this is also the era when literary critics wrote some of the classic works of literary history, charting American postmodern literature: works by Brian McHale, Linda Hutcheon, and Paul Maltby who argues that it was not until the 1980s that the term "postmodern" caught on as the label for this style of writing.

A new generation of writers—such as David Foster Wallace, William T. Vollmann, Dave Eggers, Michael Chabon, Zadie Smith, Chuck Palahniuk, Jennifer Egan, Neil Gaiman, Carole Maso, Richard Powers, Jonathan Lethem, Brandon Hobson—and publications such as McSweeney's, The Believer, and the fiction pages of The New Yorker, herald either a new chapter of postmodernism or possibly post-postmodernism. Many of these authors emphasize a strong urge for sincerity in literature.

== Common themes and techniques ==
Several themes and techniques are indicative of writing in the postmodern era. These themes and techniques are often used together. For example, metafiction and pastiche are often used for irony. These are not used by all postmodernists, nor is this an exclusive list of features.

=== Irony, playfulness, black humor ===
Linda Hutcheon claimed postmodern fiction as a whole could be characterized by the ironic quote marks, that much of it can be taken as tongue-in-cheek. This irony, along with black humor and the general concept of "play" (related to Derrida's concept or the ideas advocated by Roland Barthes in The Pleasure of the Text) are among the most recognizable aspects of postmodernism. Though the idea of employing these in literature did not start with the postmodernists (the modernists were often playful and ironic), they became central features in many postmodern works. In fact, several novelists later to be labeled postmodern were first collectively labeled black humorists: John Barth, Joseph Heller, William Gaddis, Kurt Vonnegut, Bruce Jay Friedman, etc. It is common for postmodernists to treat serious subjects in a playful and humorous way: for example, the way Heller and Vonnegut address the events of World War II. The central concept of Heller's Catch-22 is the irony of the now-idiomatic "catch-22", and the narrative is structured around a long series of similar ironies. Thomas Pynchon's The Crying of Lot 49 in particular provides prime examples of playfulness, often including silly wordplay, within a serious context. For example, it contains characters named Mike Fallopian and Stanley Koteks and a radio station called KCUF, while the novel as a whole has a serious subject and a complex structure. Colson Whitehead is described as relying on irony to explore themes of freedom, society, and diversity.

=== Intertextuality ===
Since postmodernism represents a decentred concept of the universe in which individual works are not isolated creations, much of the focus in the study of postmodern literature is on intertextuality: the relationship between one text (a novel for example) and another or one text within the interwoven fabric of literary history. Intertextuality in postmodern literature can be a reference or parallel to another literary work, an extended discussion of a work, or the adoption of a style. In postmodern literature this commonly manifests as references to fairy tales—as in works by Margaret Atwood, Donald Barthelme, and many others—or in references to popular genres such as sci-fi and detective fiction. Often intertextuality is more complicated than a single reference to another text. Robert Coover's Pinocchio in Venice, for example, links Pinocchio to Thomas Mann's Death in Venice. Also, Umberto Eco's The Name of the Rose takes on the form of a detective novel and makes references to authors such as Aristotle, Sir Arthur Conan Doyle, and Borges. An early 20th century example of intertextuality which influenced later postmodernists is "Pierre Menard, Author of the Quixote" by Jorge Luis Borges, a story with significant references to Don Quixote which is also a good example of intertextuality with its references to Medieval romances. Don Quixote is a common reference with postmodernists, for example Kathy Acker's novel Don Quixote: Which Was a Dream. References to Don Quixote can also be found in Paul Auster's post-modern detective story, City of Glass. Another example of intertextuality in postmodernism is John Barth's The Sot-Weed Factor which deals with Ebenezer Cooke's poem of the same name.

=== Pastiche ===
Related to postmodern intertextuality, pastiche means to combine, or "paste" together, multiple elements. In Postmodernist literature this can be a homage to or a parody of past styles. It can be seen as a representation of the chaotic, pluralistic, or information-drenched aspects of postmodern society. It can be a combination of multiple genres to create a unique narrative or to comment on situations in postmodernity: for example, William S. Burroughs uses science fiction, detective fiction, westerns; Margaret Atwood uses science fiction and fairy tales; Umberto Eco uses detective fiction, fairy tales, and science fiction, and so on. Though pastiche commonly involves the mixing of genres, many other elements are also included (metafiction and temporal distortion are common in the broader pastiche of the postmodern novel). In Robert Coover's 1977 novel The Public Burning, Coover mixes historically inaccurate accounts of Richard Nixon interacting with historical figures and fictional characters such as Uncle Sam and Betty Crocker. Pastiche can instead involve a compositional technique, for example the cut-up technique employed by Burroughs. Another example is B. S. Johnson's 1969 novel The Unfortunates; it was released in a box with no binding so that readers could assemble it however they chose.

=== Metafiction ===
Metafiction is essentially writing about writing or "foregrounding the apparatus", as is typical of deconstructionist approaches, making the artificiality of art or the fictionality of fiction apparent to the reader and generally disregarding the necessity for "willing suspension of disbelief." For example, postmodern sensibility and metafiction dictate that works of parody should parody the idea of parody itself.

Metafiction is often employed to undermine the authority of the author, for unexpected narrative shifts, to advance a story in a unique way, for emotional distance, or to comment on the act of storytelling. For example, Italo Calvino's 1979 novel If on a winter's night a traveler is about a reader attempting to read a novel of the same name. Kurt Vonnegut also commonly used this technique: the first chapter of his 1969 novel Slaughterhouse-Five is about the process of writing the novel and calls attention to his own presence throughout the novel. Though much of the novel has to do with Vonnegut's own experiences during the firebombing of Dresden, Vonnegut continually points out the artificiality of the central narrative arc which contains obviously fictional elements such as aliens and time travel. Similarly, Tim O'Brien's 1990 short story cycle The Things They Carried, about one platoon's experiences during the Vietnam War, features a character named Tim O'Brien; though O'Brien was a Vietnam veteran, the book is a work of fiction and O'Brien calls into question the fictionality of the characters and incidents throughout the book. One story in the book, "How to Tell a True War Story", questions the nature of telling stories. Factual retellings of war stories, the narrator says, would be unbelievable, and heroic, moral war stories don't capture the truth. David Foster Wallace in The Pale King writes that the copyright page claims it is fiction only for legal purposes, and that everything within the novel is non-fiction. He employs a character in the novel named David Foster Wallace. Giannina Braschi also has a namesake character and uses metafiction and pastiche in her novels Yo-Yo Boing! and United States of Banana about the collapse of the American empire. Brandon Hobson uses metafiction in his 2025 novel, The Devil is a Southpaw by employing a character named Brandon H. whom receives the manuscript from an old acquaintance from juvenile incareceration.

=== Fabulation ===
Fabulation is a term sometimes used interchangeably with metafiction and relates to pastiche and Magic Realism. It is a rejection of realism which embraces the notion that literature is a created work and not bound by notions of mimesis and verisimilitude. Thus, fabulation challenges some traditional notions of literature—the traditional structure of a novel or role of the narrator, for example—and integrates other traditional notions of storytelling, including fantastical elements, such as magic and myth, or elements from popular genres such as science fiction. By some accounts, the term was coined by Robert Scholes in his book The Fabulators. Strong examples of fabulation in contemporary literature are found in Salman Rushdie's Haroun and the Sea of Stories.

=== Poioumena ===
Poioumenon (plural: poioumena; from Ancient Greek: ποιούμενον, "product") is a term coined by Alastair Fowler to refer to a specific type of metafiction in which the story is about the process of creation. According to Fowler, "the poioumenon is calculated to offer opportunities to explore the boundaries of fiction and reality—the limits of narrative truth." In many cases, the book will be about the process of creating the book or includes a central metaphor for this process. Common examples of this are Thomas Carlyle's Sartor Resartus, and Laurence Sterne's Tristram Shandy, which is about the narrator's frustrated attempt to tell his own story. A significant postmodern example is Vladimir Nabokov's Pale Fire (1962), in which the narrator, Kinbote, claims he is writing an analysis of John Shade's long poem "Pale Fire", but the narrative of the relationship between Shade and Kinbote is presented in what is ostensibly the footnotes to the poem. Similarly, the self-conscious narrator in Salman Rushdie's Midnight's Children parallels the creation of his book to the creation of chutney and the creation of independent India. Anagrams (1970), by David R. Slavitt, describes a week in the life of a poet and his creation of a poem which, by the last couple of pages, proves remarkably prophetic. In The Comforters, Muriel Spark's protagonist hears the sound of a typewriter and voices that later may transform into the novel itself. Jan Křesadlo purports to be merely the translator of a "chrononaut's" handed down Homeric Greek science fiction epic, the Astronautilia. Other postmodern examples of poioumena include Samuel Beckett's trilogy (Molloy, Malone Dies and The Unnamable); Doris Lessing's The Golden Notebook; John Fowles's Mantissa; William Golding's The Paper Men; Gilbert Sorrentino's Mulligan Stew; and S. D. Chrostowska's Permission.

=== Historiographic metafiction ===
Linda Hutcheon coined the term "historiographic metafiction" to refer to works that fictionalize actual historical events or figures; notable examples include The General in His Labyrinth by Gabriel García Márquez (about Simón Bolívar), Flaubert's Parrot by Julian Barnes (about Gustave Flaubert), Ragtime by E. L. Doctorow (which features such historical figures as Harry Houdini, Henry Ford, Archduke Franz Ferdinand of Austria, Booker T. Washington, Sigmund Freud, and Carl Jung), and Rabih Alameddine's Koolaids: The Art of War which makes references to the Lebanese Civil War and various real life political figures. Thomas Pynchon's Mason and Dixon also employs this concept; for example, a scene featuring George Washington smoking marijuana is included. John Fowles deals similarly with the Victorian period in The French Lieutenant's Woman. Kurt Vonnegut's Slaughterhouse-Five has been said to feature a metafictional, "Janus-headed" outlook in the way the novel seeks to represent both actual historical events from World War II while, at the same time, problematizes the very notion of doing exactly that.

=== Temporal distortion ===
Temporal distortion is a common technique in modernist fiction: fragmentation and nonlinear narratives are central features in both modern and postmodern literature. Temporal distortion in postmodern fiction is used in a variety of ways, often for the sake of irony. Historiographic metafiction is an example of this. Distortions in time are central features in many of Kurt Vonnegut's nonlinear novels, the most famous of which is perhaps Billy Pilgrim in Slaughterhouse-Five becoming "unstuck in time". In Flight to Canada, Ishmael Reed deals playfully with anachronisms, Abraham Lincoln using a telephone for example. Time may also overlap, repeat, or bifurcate into multiple possibilities. For example, in Robert Coover's "The Babysitter" from Pricksongs & Descants, the author presents multiple possible events occurring simultaneously—in one section the babysitter is murdered while in another section nothing happens and so on—yet no version of the story is favored as the correct version.

=== Magic realism ===
Magic realism may be literary work marked by the use of still, sharply defined, smoothly painted images of figures and objects depicted in a surrealistic manner. The themes and subjects are often imaginary, somewhat outlandish and fantastic and with a certain dream-like quality. Some of the characteristic features of this kind of fiction are the mingling and juxtaposition of the realistic and the fantastic or bizarre, skillful time shifts, convoluted and even labyrinthine narratives and plots, miscellaneous use of dreams, myths and fairy stories, expressionistic and even surrealistic description, arcane erudition, the element of surprise or abrupt shock, the horrific and the inexplicable. It has been applied, for instance, to the works of Massimo Bontempelli, author of Eva Ultima (1923), and of Jorge Luis Borges, author of Historia universal de la infamia (1935), considered a bridge between modernism and postmodernism in world literature. Colombian novelist Gabriel García Márquez is also regarded as a notable exponent of this kind of fiction—especially his novel One Hundred Years of Solitude. The Cuban Alejo Carpentier (The Kingdom of This World, 1949) is another described as a "magic realist". Postmodernists such as Italo Calvino (The Baron in the Trees, 1957), and Salman Rushdie (The Ground Beneath Her Feet, 1999), commonly use magic realism in their work. A fusion of fabulism with magic realism is apparent in such early 21st-century American short stories as Kevin Brockmeier's "The Ceiling", Dan Chaon's "Big Me", Jacob M. Appel's "Exposure", and Elizabeth Graver's "The Mourning Door".. More recently, Brandon Hobson's novels, The Devil is a Southpaw and The Removed both use magical realism and Native mythology.

=== Technoculture and hyperreality ===
Fredric Jameson called postmodernism the "cultural logic of late capitalism". "Late capitalism" implies that society has moved past the industrial age and into the information age. Likewise, Jean Baudrillard claimed postmodernity was defined by a shift into hyperreality in which simulations have replaced the real. In postmodernity people are inundated with information, technology has become a central focus in many lives, and one's understanding of the real is mediated by simulations of the real. Many works of fiction have dealt with this aspect of postmodernity with characteristic irony and pastiche. For example, the virtual reality of "empathy boxes" in Philip K. Dick's novel Do Androids Dream of Electric Sheep? in which a new technology-based religion called Mercerism arises. Another example is Don DeLillo's White Noise, which presents characters who are bombarded with a "white noise" of television, product brand names, and clichés. The cyberpunk fiction of William Gibson, Neal Stephenson, and many others use science fiction techniques to address this postmodern, hyperreal information bombardment.

=== Paranoia ===
Perhaps demonstrated most famously and effectively in Heller's Catch-22, the sense of paranoia, the belief that there's an ordering system behind the chaos of the world is another recurring postmodern theme. For the postmodernist, no ordering is extremely dependent upon the subject, so paranoia often straddles the line between delusion and brilliant insight. Pynchon's The Crying of Lot 49, long-considered a prototype of postmodern literature, presents a situation which may be "coincidence or conspiracy – or a cruel joke". This often coincides with the theme of technoculture and hyperreality. For example, in Breakfast of Champions by Kurt Vonnegut, the character Dwayne Hoover becomes violent when he's convinced that everyone else in the world is a robot and he is the only human. This theme is likewise present in the satirical dystopian science-fiction tabletop role-playing game Paranoia.

=== Maximalism and the "Systems Novel" ===
Dubbed maximalism by some critics, and overlapping with the related term systems novel, the sprawling canvas and fragmented narrative of such writers as Dave Eggers and David Foster Wallace has generated controversy on the "purpose" of a novel as narrative and the standards by which it should be judged. The postmodern position is that the style of a novel must be appropriate to what it depicts and represents, and points back to such examples in previous ages as Gargantua by François Rabelais and the Odyssey of Homer, which Nancy Felson hails as the exemplar of the polytropic audience and its engagement with a work.

In The Maximalist Novel: From Thomas Pynchon's Gravity's Rainbow to Roberto Bolano's 2666, (2014) Stefano Ercolino characterised maximalism as "an aesthetically hybrid genre of the contemporary novel that develops in the second half of the twentieth century in the United States, then 'emigrates' to Europe and Latin America at the threshold the twenty-first.". Ercolino singled out seven novels for particular attention: Gravity's Rainbow, Infinite Jest, Underworld, White Teeth, The Corrections, 2666, and 2005 dopo Cristo by Babette Factory.

Tom LeClair had previously coined the term "systems novel" in his 1987 book In the Loop: Don DeLillo and the Systems Novel, exploring the concept further in his 1989 book, The Art of Excess: Mastery in Contemporary American Fiction. Having introduced the term in relation to Don DeLillo, Tom LeClair chose seven novels as the focus of The Art of Excess. They were: Gravity's Rainbow (by Thomas Pynchon), Something Happened (by Joseph Heller), J R (by William Gaddis), The Public Burning (by Robert Coover), Women and Men (by Joseph McElroy), LETTERS (by John Barth) and Always Coming Home (by Ursula Le Guin). LeClair's systems novels were all "long, large and dense" and all in some way striving for "mastery", showing similarity to Moby-Dick and Absalom, Absalom! in "range of reference, artistic sophistication, and desire for profound effect." LeClair wrote, "These seven novels are about mastery, about excesses of power, force, and authority in arenas small and large: the self's mastery of itself, economic and political hegemony, force in history and culture, the transforming power of science and technology, the control of information and art. These novels are also about the size and scale of contemporary experience: how multiplicity and magnitude create new relations and new proportions among persons and entities, how quantity affects quality, how massiveness is related to mastery."

Although Ercolino's "maximalist" examples overlapped with LeClair's earlier systems novel examples, Ercolino did not see "mastery" as a defining feature. According to Ercolino, "it would make more sense to speak of an ambiguous relationship between maximalist narrative forms and power."

Many modernist critics, notably B.R. Myers in his polemic A Reader's Manifesto, attack the maximalist novel as being disorganized, sterile and filled with language play for its own sake, empty of emotional commitment—and therefore empty of value as a novel. Yet there are counter-examples, such as Pynchon's Mason & Dixon and David Foster Wallace's Infinite Jest where postmodern narrative coexists with emotional commitment.

In a 2022 GQ article, "Is the 'systems novel' the future of fiction?", Sam Leith compared Tom McCarthy's The Making of Incarnation with Dave Eggers' The Every. Leith wrote, "The question ultimately posed, or pointed to, by systems novels is: can novels do without people? And the answer I would give is: not completely. The problem is, perhaps, that the part of our minds that responds to old-fashioned novels hasn't changed as fast as the world around it."

=== Minimalism ===
Literary minimalism can be characterized as a focus on a surface description where readers are expected to take an active role in the creation of a story. The characters in minimalist stories and novels tend to be unexceptional. Generally, the short stories are "slice of life" stories. Minimalism, the opposite of maximalism, is a representation of only the most basic and necessary pieces, specific by economy with words. Minimalist authors hesitate to use adjectives, adverbs, or meaningless details. Instead of providing every minute detail, the author provides a general context and then allows the reader's imagination to shape the story. Among those categorized as postmodernist, literary minimalism is most commonly associated with Jon Fosse and especially Samuel Beckett.

=== Fragmentation ===
Fragmentation is another important aspect of postmodern literature. Various elements, concerning plot, characters, themes, imagery and factual references are fragmented and dispersed throughout the entire work. In general, there is an interrupted sequence of events, character development and action which can at first glance look modern. Fragmentation purports, however, to depict a metaphysically unfounded, chaotic universe. It can occur in language, sentence structure or grammar. In Z213: Exit, a fictional diary by Greek writer Dimitris Lyacos, one of the major exponents of fragmentation in postmodern literature, an almost telegraphic style is adopted, devoid, in most part, of articles and conjunctions. The text is interspersed with lacunae and everyday language combines with poetry and biblical references leading up to syntax disruption and distortion of grammar. A sense of alienation of character and world is created by a language medium invented to form a kind of intermittent syntax structure which complements the illustration of the main character's subconscious fears and paranoia in the course of his exploration of a seemingly chaotic world.

Patricia Lockwood's 2021 Booker-shortlisted novel, No One Is Talking About This is a recent example of fragmentation, employing the technique to consider the effects of internet usage on quality of life and the creative process. Additionally, Brandon Hobson's 2025 PEN Jean Stein finalist novel, The Devil is a Southpaw uses fragmentation to consider the chaotic world of juvenile incarceration and an unreliabile narrator.

== Different perspectives ==
John Barth, a postmodernist novelist who talks often about the label "postmodern", wrote an influential essay in 1967 called "The Literature of Exhaustion" and in 1980 published "The Literature of Replenishment" in order to clarify the earlier essay. "The Literature of Exhaustion" was about the need for a new era in literature after modernism had exhausted itself. In "The Literature of Replenishment" Barth says:

My ideal Postmodernist author neither merely repudiates nor merely imitates either his 20th-century Modernist parents or his 19th-century premodernist grandparents. He has the first half of our century under his belt, but not on his back. Without lapsing into moral or artistic simplism, shoddy craftsmanship, Madison Avenue venality, or either false or real naiveté, he nevertheless aspires to a fiction more democratic in its appeal than such late-Modernist marvels as Beckett's Texts for Nothing... The ideal Postmodernist novel will somehow rise above the quarrel between realism and irrealism, formalism and "contentism", pure and committed literature, coterie fiction and junk fiction...

Many of the well-known postmodern novels deal with World War II, one of the most famous of which being Joseph Heller's Catch-22. Heller claimed his novel and many of the other American novels of the time had more to do with the state of the country after the war:

The antiwar and anti government feelings in the book belong to the period following World War II: the Korean War, the cold war of the 1950s. A general disintegration of belief took place then, and it affected Catch-22 in that the form of the novel became almost disintegrated. Catch-22 was a collage; if not in structure, then in the ideology of the novel itself ... Without being aware of it, I was part of a near-movement in fiction. While I was writing Catch-22, J. P. Donleavy was writing The Ginger Man, Jack Kerouac was writing On the Road, Ken Kesey was writing One Flew Over the Cuckoo's Nest, Thomas Pynchon was writing V., and Kurt Vonnegut was writing Cat's Cradle. I don't think any one of us even knew any of the others. Certainly I didn't know them. Whatever forces were at work shaping a trend in art were affecting not just me, but all of us. The feelings of helplessness and persecution in Catch-22 are very strong in Cat's Cradle.

In his Reflections on 'The Name of the Rose', the novelist and theorist Umberto Eco explains his idea of postmodernism as a kind of double-coding, and as a transhistorical phenomenon:

[P]ostmodernism ... [is] not a trend to be chronologically defined, but, rather, an ideal category – or better still a Kunstwollen, a way of operating. ... I think of the postmodern attitude as that of a man who loves a very cultivated woman and knows that he cannot say to her "I love you madly", because he knows that she knows (and that she knows he knows) that these words have already been written by Barbara Cartland. Still there is a solution. He can say "As Barbara Cartland would put it, I love you madly". At this point, having avoided false innocence, having said clearly it is no longer possible to talk innocently, he will nevertheless say what he wanted to say to the woman: that he loves her in an age of lost innocence.

Novelist David Foster Wallace in his 1990 essay "E Unibus Pluram: Television and U.S. Fiction" makes the connection between the rise of postmodernism and the rise of television with its tendency toward self-reference and the ironic juxtaposition of what's seen and what's said. This, he claims, explains the preponderance of pop culture references in postmodern literature:

It was in post-atomic America that pop influences on literature became something more than technical. About the time television first gasped and sucked air, mass popular U.S. culture seemed to become High-Art-viable as a collection of symbols and myth. The episcopate of this pop-reference movement were the post-Nabokovian Black Humorists, the Metafictionists and assorted franc-and latinophiles only later comprised by "postmodern". The erudite, sardonic fictions of the Black Humorists introduced a generation of new fiction writers who saw themselves as sort of avant-avant-garde, not only cosmopolitan and polyglot but also technologically literate, products of more than just one region, heritage, and theory, and citizens of a culture that said its most important stuff about itself via mass media. In this regard one thinks particularly of the Gaddis of The Recognitions and JR, the Barth of The End of the Road and The Sot-Weed Factor, and the Pynchon of The Crying of Lot 49 ... Here's Robert Coover's 1966 A Public Burning, in which Eisenhower buggers Nixon on-air, and his 1968 A Political Fable, in which the Cat in the Hat runs for president.

Hans-Peter Wagner offers this approach to defining postmodern literature:

Postmodernism ... can be used at least in two ways – firstly, to give a label to the period after 1968 (which would then encompass all forms of fiction, both innovative and traditional), and secondly, to describe the highly experimental literature produced by writers beginning with Lawrence Durrell and John Fowles in the 1960s and reaching to the breathless works of Martin Amis and the "Chemical (Scottish) Generation" of the fin-de-siècle. In what follows, the term 'postmodernist' is used for experimental authors (especially Durrell, Fowles, Carter, Brooke-Rose, Barnes, Ackroyd, and Martin Amis) while "post- modern" is applied to authors who have been less innovative.

== See also ==
- Postmodernism
- Hysterical realism
- Metafiction
- Metamodernism
- List of postmodern critics
- List of postmodern novels
- List of postmodern writers
