= Mark Greif =

American author and academic

Mark Greif (born 1975) is an author, educator and cultural critic. His most recent book is Against Everything. One of the co-founders of n+1, he is a frequent contributor to the magazine and writes for numerous other publications. Greif currently teaches English at Stanford University.

== Background and education ==
Greif received a BA in History and Literature from Harvard in 1997, after which he received a Marshall Scholarship, which he used to study British Literature and 19th and 20th century American Literature at Oxford through 1999. He holds a PhD in American studies from Yale.

== Stanford ==
Greif is associate professor of English at Stanford University.

Winner of the Morris D. Forkosch Prize for the best first book in intellectual history (2015).

== n+1 ==
In the fall of 2004, along with fellow writers and editors Keith Gessen, Chad Harbach, Benjamin Kunkel, and Marco Roth, Greif launched the literary journal n + 1. Greif has served as both an editor and writer for the journal, contributing essays on a wide variety of topics: politics, sociology, Radiohead. In 2010, he described the journal's mission: “We are creating a long print archive in an era of the short sound bite.”

== Criticism ==
Greif's criticism is marked by a willingness to address pop culture, conservative books, and leftist academic critical theory, and to link these to literature and larger questions of culture.

== Works by Greif ==
Books

- The Age of the Crisis of Man, 2015
- Against Everything: Essays, 2016

Articles in n+1

- "Against Exercise," Fall 2004.
- "Mogadishu, Baghdad, Troy," Fall 2004.
- "The Concept of Experiences," Spring 2005.
- "Radiohead, or the Philosophy of Pop," Fall 2005.
- "Afternoon of the Sex Children," Winter 2006, reprinted as 'Children of the Revolution', Harpers Magazine November 2006
- "Notes From An Occupation" (the Occupy Wall Street demonstrators), with Astra Taylor, Fall, 2011

Reviews

- "On Giorgio Agamben: Apocalypse Deferred," Spring 2005.
- "On Reality TV," Fall 2005.
- "The Hipster in the Mirror", New York Times, November 12, 2010.

Web

- "The Tattoo"
