= Chad Harbach =

American writer (born 1975)

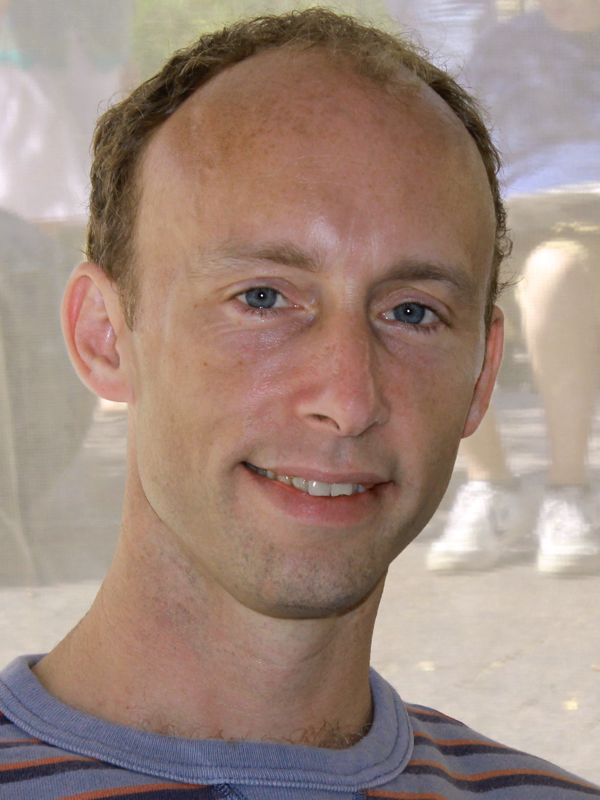
- Chad Harbach at the 2011 Texas Book Festival.
- Born: Chad Daniel Harbach; 1975 (age 50–51)
- Education: Harvard University; University of Virginia (MFA)
- Occupations: Editor, writer

Chad Harbach (born 1975) is an American writer. An editor at the journal n+1, he is the author of the 2011 novel The Art of Fielding.

== Early life and education ==
Harbach grew up in Racine, Wisconsin. His father was an accountant and his mother the head of a Montessori school. Harbach graduated from Harvard University, where he befriended fellow writers and journalists Keith Gessen and Benjamin Kunkel. He received an MFA from the University of Virginia in 2004.

== n+1 ==
In 2004, Mark Greif, Gessen, Harbach, Kunkel, and Marco Roth launched the literary journal n+1; Harbach had come up with the name as early as 1998. Harbach is both an editor and writer for the journal, contributing essays on environmentalism, David Foster Wallace, and the Boston Red Sox.

== The Art of Fielding ==
Harbach worked on his novel The Art of Fielding for nine years. The novel, set at Westish College, a small school on the shore of Lake Michigan, tells the story of the gifted young shortstop Henry Skrimshander, whose errant throw upends the lives of five people. In high school, Harbach had played baseball, along with golf and basketball; in March 2010, he told Bloomberg News, "What fascinates me about baseball is that although it's a team game, and a team becomes a kind of family, the players on the field are each very much alone. Your teammates depend on you and support you, but at the moments that count they can't bail you out."

After a heated auction ($665,000), the book was acquired and published by Little, Brown in the fall of 2011. A Vanity Fair e-book describing the writing and publication of the novel was later released. The Art of Fielding was met with extraordinary critical praise. In The New York Times, Michiko Kakutani wrote, "The Art of Fielding is not only a wonderful baseball novel—it zooms immediately into the pantheon of classics, alongside The Natural by Bernard Malamud and The Southpaw by Mark Harris—but it's also a magical, melancholy story about friendship and coming of age that marks the debut of an immensely talented writer."

== MFA vs NYC ==
Harbach edited a book about two American writing cultures, released in February 2014. The book was based on Harbach's widely read essay "MFA vs NYC," and featured essays by n+1 contributors such as Elif Batuman and Keith Gessen, as well as the novelist George Saunders. The Times's Dwight Garner described it as a "serious, helpful and wily book."

== The Brightness ==
In February 2026, Little Brown announced that it would publish Harbach's second novel, The Brightness, in October 2026. Like The Art of Fielding, the new book will be set at Westish College, a fictional liberal arts school in Wisconsin, as well as in New York City. It will focus on a character who appeared in the first novel, Pella Affenlight, the daughter of the college's former president, and her friend Irma.

Harbach said in a statement that "The Brightness is Pella’s book, and that of her friends and lovers, as she strives both to put down roots and find transcendence. The world she moves through is a multifarious one, encompassing a sleepy college thrust into the culture-war spotlight, a sun-splashed wedding on Block Island, and a New York City of service jobs, glittering parties, and neglected second-wave art."

Dwight Garner described The Brightness as "full of life, surprises, close observation, spiraling and interlocking plots, sharp new characters wheeling into view, striking set pieces, overlapping literary allusions and neo-Updikean craftsmanship."

== Awards and recognition ==
- 2011 The Art of Fielding named on The New York Times Best Books of 2011 list
- 2011 The Art of Fielding named Amazon's Best Book of the Year
- 2012 Bottari Lattes Grinzane nominee for The Art of Fielding
- 2012 Friends of American Writers Book of the Year for The Art of Fielding
- 2012 The Guardian First Book Award nominee for The Art of Fielding
- 2012 International Dublin Literary Award longlist for The Art of Fielding
- 2012 Library of Virginia Literary Award nominee for The Art of Fielding
- 2012 Los Angeles Times Book Prize nominee for Art Seidenbaum Award for First Fiction for The Art of Fielding
- 2012 Midwest Booksellers Choice Award for The Art of Fielding
- 2012 PEN/Hemingway Foundation Award nominee for The Art of Fielding
- 2012 Wisconsin Library Association Literary Award for The Art of Fielding

== Controversy ==
In September, 2017, writer Charles C. Green sued Chad Harbach claiming "large-scale misappropriation" by Harbach. The suit noted a very strong plot and style resemblance between The Art of Fielding and Green's previously completed screenplay, Bucky's 9th. Green claimed Harbach had somehow seen an unpublished version of his manuscript.

In July, 2018, Green's suit was dismissed.
