= N+1 =

American literary magazine

n+1
- Editors: Lisa Borst, Mark Krotov, Dayna Tortorici
- Categories: Culture, literature, politics
- Frequency: Triannually
- Founder: Keith Gessen, Benjamin Kunkel, Mark Greif, Chad Harbach, Allison Lorentzen and Marco Roth
- Founded: 2004
- Country: United States
- Based in: Brooklyn, NY
- Language: English
- Website: nplusonemag.com
- ISSN: 1549-0033

n+1 is a New York–based American literary magazine that publishes social criticism, political commentary, essays, art, poetry, book reviews, and short fiction. It is published in print three times annually with regular articles being published online. Each print issue averages around 200 pages in length.

== Overview ==
n+1 began in late 2004, the project of Keith Gessen, Benjamin Kunkel, Mark Greif, Chad Harbach, Allison Lorentzen and Marco Roth. The magazine is described by Gessen as "like Partisan Review, except not dead". It was launched out of a feeling of dissatisfaction with the current intellectual scene in the United States, with the editors citing The Baffler, Hermenaut, and the early years of Partisan Review as inspiration for their magazine. Each of those magazines embodied the age where the "little magazine" was a veritable institution and a major center of innovation in arts and politics.

Their outlook is most frequently summed up by the last lines of their first issue where the editors proclaimed: "it is time to say what you mean". Yet in the third issue, critic James Wood responded to criticism of his negative criticism and, singling out this quote from issue 1, stated: "The Editors had unwittingly proved the gravamen of their own critique: that it is easier to criticize than to propose."

The name n+1, conceived in a moment of frustration, comes from an algebraic expression. Harbach recalls that "Keith and I were talking, and he kept saying, 'Why would we start a magazine when there are already so many out there?' And I said, jokingly, 'N+1'—whatever exists, there is always something vital that has to be added or we wouldn't feel anything lacking in this world."

=== Position ===
Their mission is somewhat informed by critical theory, to which they readily admit the attraction and limitations. In an article on theory, the editors said: "The big mistake right now would be to fail to keep faith with what theory once meant to us."

Their stance embraces theory but keeps a careful distance from the academicization of theory: "Theory is dead, and long live theory. The designated mourners have tenure, anyway, so they'll be around a bit. As for the rest of us, an opening has emerged, in the novel and in intellect. What to do with it?" In this vein, they make frequent references to the Frankfurt School, often criticize the commodification of culture, and speak positively of writers such as Don DeLillo.

=== Content ===
Each issue of n+1 opens with a section called The Intellectual Situation, which criticizes aspects of the current intellectual scene. For example, in the first issue, they called McSweeney's a "regressive avant-garde"; in Issue 18, the editors criticize "the Rage Machine" in which "tech corporations beg you to say your piece for the sake of content-generation, free publicity, hype, and ad sales". They have also criticized The New Republic, The Weekly Standard, and literary figures such as Dale Peck. This is followed by a short Politics section. Most of each issue consists of fiction and essays. Issues then close with a review section, which consists of reviews of books, intellectual figures, and pop phenomena.

== Critical response ==
The magazine has received mixed reception. Generally, n+1's detractors decry the editors' youth and perceived elitism. As the magazine is purportedly an effort to engage a generation in a struggle against the current literary landscape, such elitism seems counterintuitive to the ideals upon which the magazine was founded. The New Criterion critically asked, "is your journal really necessary?" and accused them of exaggerating their own importance. The Times Literary Supplement wryly satirized Kunkel's quote, "We're angrier than Dave Eggers and his crowd", and compared that quote against their third issue's unsigned article about and titled "Dating". Literary editor Gordon Lish has called the magazine a "crock of shit".

Others have appreciated these very qualities, writing favorably of the boldness of the project itself and the sincerity and enthusiasm of its contributors. Critic A. O. Scott of The New York Times commented on this in a feature article on the new wave of young, intellectual publications in a September 2005 issue of The New York Times Magazine, saying that n+1 was trying to "organize a generational struggle against laziness and cynicism, to raise once again the banners of creative enthusiasm and intellectual engagement" and that it had a feel that was "decidedly youthful, not only in [its] characteristic generational concerns — the habit of nonchalantly blending pop culture, literary esoterica and academic theory, for instance, or the unnerving ability to appear at once mocking and sincere — but also in the sense of bravado and grievance that ripples through their pages". In a review of Gessen's novel All the Sad Young Literary Men, Joyce Carol Oates referenced the author's founding of "the spirited intellectual literary journal n+1".

Vox described that magazine as "Deliberately anachronistic like an artisanal pickle shop, but with a cosmopolitan flair — like a pickle shop that also sells kimchi."

== Books ==
=== n+1 Research Branch Small Books Series ===
Beginning in 2006, with the publication of PS 1 Symposium: A Practical Avant-Garde, n+1 introduced the n+1 Research Branch Pamphlet Series, later known as the n+1 Research Branch Small Books Series. This self-published series expands on the concerns of the magazine, and focuses on topics as disparate as "life and reading" in early adulthood, feminism, hipster culture, and the collapse of America's financial system. There are six titles in the series in addition to A Practical Avant-Garde: What We Should Have Known: Two Discussions, What Was the Hipster: A Sociological Investigation, The Trouble is the Banks: Letters to Wall Street, No Regrets: Three Discussions, and "Buzz", a play by Benjamin Kunkel. No Regrets, comprising conversations among women writers about their reading, was praised by NPR as "intimate and erudite", but The New Republic, gathering its own panel of women staff writers, criticized the book's discussion of a so-called "secret canon" as being insular.

=== The Financial Crisis and Occupy ===
==== Diary of a Very Bad Year ====
In addition to the Research Branch's The Trouble is the Banks, the n+1 has published several works concerning the financial crisis and the Occupy movement. In 2010, n+1 collaborated with Harper Perennial to publish Diary of a Very Bad Year: Confessions of an Anonymous Hedge Fund Manager, a series of one-on-one interviews between Gessen and "a very charming, very intelligent" member of the finance industry that explore the origins and effects of the financialization of the economy. Some sections of the book had been published online and in the magazine from 2007 to 2010. New York Times book reviewer Dwight Garner called the book "thoughtful, funny and unpretentious"—"an urbane if frazzled chronicle of shock and despair".

With direction from Astra Taylor and Sarah Leonard, n+1 built on this discussion of the financial crisis and its fallout with the publication of the Occupy! Gazette, "a semi-regular, forty-page tabloid newspaper inspired by the Occupy movement". The Gazette featured interviews and panels, as well as firsthand reporting from Occupy demonstrations around the United States. n+1 ultimately published four issues of the Occupy! Gazette, in addition to one special issue published in May 2014, "Free Cecily!", which covered the arrest and trial of Occupy organizer and protester Cecily McMillan.

In 2011, in collaboration with Verso, n+1 published Occupy! Scenes from an Occupied America, edited by Astra Taylor and Keith Gessen, along with "editors from n+1, Dissent, Triple Canopy and The New Inquiry". The book featured commentary from Taylor, Mark Greif, Nikil Saval, and Rebecca Solnit, alongside reprinted remarks made at Zucotti Park by Judith Butler and Slavoj Žižek. Taylor, Greif, Gessen, and others contributed segments entitled "Scenes from an Occupation," which reported the day-to-day conditions at Occupy Wall Street; "Scenes from Occupied Atlanta" and "Scenes from Occupied Boston", among others, reported from their respective locations around the country. London School of Economics professor Jason Hickel praised the book for its timeliness and "moments of excellent insight", but noted that the speed with which Occupy! was published limited the depth of its analysis.

=== Co-publishing ===
==== Faber and Faber ====
n+1, in 2014, initiated a publishing partnership with Farrar, Straus and Giroux subsidiary Faber and Faber. The first publication, MFA vs NYC:Two Cultures of American Fiction, explores fiction's gravitation toward the academy in over a dozen essays from writers including David Foster Wallace, George Saunders, Elif Batuman, and Fredric Jameson. The editor of MFA vs NYC, Chad Harbach, introduces the book with his essay of the same title from Issue 10 of the magazine. The New York Times praised it as a "serious, helpful and wily book," citing the various and intimate insights into the writing world that the book provides, from its "excellent miniature portraits of Frank Conroy and Gordon Lish" to "its gossip and confessional essays". MFA vs NYC has inspired various responses throughout the literary world, notably Junot Diaz's essay in The New Yorker, "MFA vs POC". There are two additional books in the Faber and Faber series: Happiness, an anthology of selected works from the first ten years of n+1, published in September 2014; and City by City, a collection of some previously published pieces from n+1's online series of the same name (2015).

== See also ==
- List of literary magazines
- Lingua Franca
