= Occupy Wall Street =

2011 American protest movement

- Part of the Occupy movement
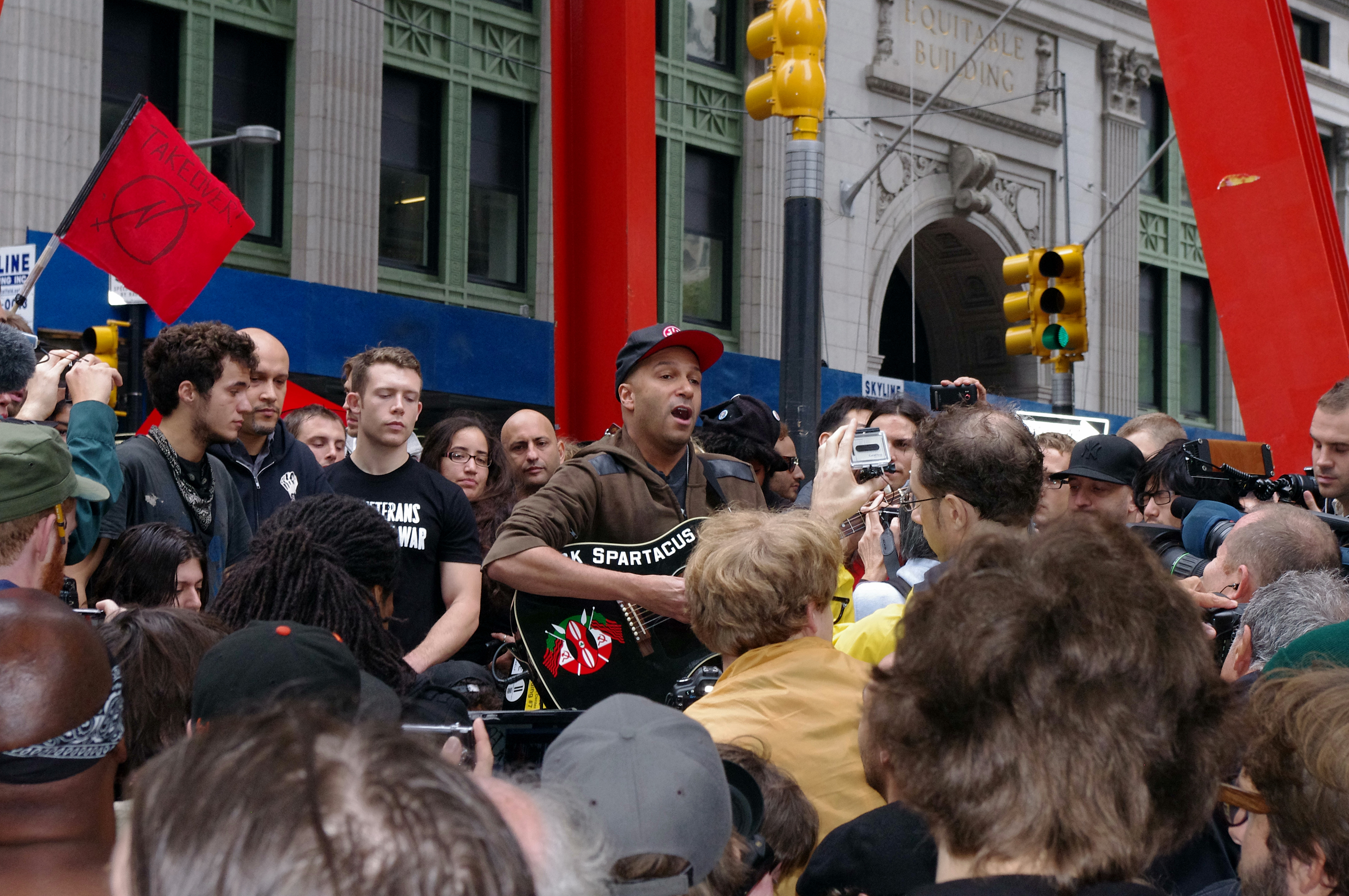
- Rage Against the Machine guitarist Tom Morello with Occupy Wall Street protesters outside of the Equitable Building at 120 Broadway in Lower Manhattan, New York on October 14, 2011
- Date: September 17 – November 15, 2011
- Location: New York City; 40°42′33″N 74°0′40″W
- Caused by: Wealth inequality; political corruption corporate influence on government
- Methods: Occupation; civil disobedience; picketing; demonstrations; Internet activism
- Result: Quashed

Parties
Occupy movement protesters	Government of New York City: New York City Police Department

Number
- Zuccotti Park Other activity in New York City: 700+ marchers arrested (crossing Brooklyn Bridge, October 1, 2011); 2,000+ marchers (march on police headquarters, October 2, 2011); 15,000+ marchers (Lower Manhattan solidarity march, October 5, 2011); 6,000+ marchers (Times Square recruitment center march, October 15, 2011); 50,000–100,000 marchers (2012 May Day march on Wall St.)

Occupy Wall Street (O.W.S.) was a left-wing populist and progressive movement against economic inequality, capitalism, corporate greed, big finance, and the influence of money in politics. It began in Zuccotti Park, located in New York City's Financial District, and lasted for fifty-nine days—from September 17 to November 15, 2011.

The motivations for Occupy Wall Street largely resulted from public distrust in the private sector during the aftermath of the Great Recession in the United States. There were many particular points of interest leading up to the Occupy movement that angered populist and left-wing groups. For instance, the 2008 bank bailouts under the George W. Bush administration utilized congressionally appropriated taxpayer funds to create the Troubled Asset Relief Program (TARP), which purchased toxic assets from failing banks and financial institutions. The U.S. Supreme Court ruling in Citizens United v. FEC in January 2010 allowed corporations to spend unlimited amounts on independent political expenditures without government regulation. Many viewed the ruling as a way for moneyed interests to corrupt public institutions and legislative bodies, such as the United States Congress.

The protests gave rise to the wider Occupy movement in the United States and other countries. The Canadian anti-consumerist magazine Adbusters initiated the call for a protest. The main issues raised by Occupy Wall Street were social and economic inequality, greed, corruption and the undue influence of corporations on government—particularly from the financial services sector. The OWS slogan, "We are the 99%", refers to income and wealth inequality in the U.S. between the wealthiest 1% and the rest of the population. To achieve their goals, protesters acted on consensus-based decisions made in general assemblies which emphasized redress through direct action over the petitioning to authorities. (Note: Author Dan Berrett writes: "But Occupy Wall Street's most defining characteristics—its decentralized nature and its intensive process of participatory, consensus-based decision-making—are rooted in other precincts of academe and activism: in the scholarship of anarchism and, specifically, in an ethnography of central Madagascar.")

The protesters were forced out of Zuccotti Park on November 15, 2011. Protesters then turned their focus to occupying banks, corporate headquarters, board meetings, foreclosed homes, college and university campuses, and social media.

== Origins ==
The original protest was called for by Kalle Lasn, Micah White and others of Adbusters, a Canadian anti-consumerist publication, who conceived of a September 17 occupation in Lower Manhattan. The call for action reflected growing anger in the public after the 2008 financial crisis. The first such proposal appeared on the Adbusters website on February 2, 2011, under the title "A Million Man March on Wall Street". This early framing showed that the protest was intended not only as a single demonstration, but also as a broader challenge to the relationship between finance and political authority in the U.S. The planning of the protest used tactics seen at other protest movements, including things such as public assembly, symbolic occupation, and decentralized organizing. Lasn registered the OccupyWallStreet.org web address on June 9, which redirected to a #OccupyWallStreet page on the Adbusters website. On July 13, 2011, in a blog post titled "A worldwide shift in revolutionary tactics", Adbusters proposed a peaceful occupation of Wall Street to protest corporate influence on democracy, the perceived lack of legal consequences for those who brought about the global crisis of monetary insolvency, and an increasing disparity in wealth, envisioned as "a fusion of Tahrir with the acampadas of Spain" two events that had taken place earlier that year. These themes later became pivotal to Occupy Wall Street's message, especially the criticism of the concentration of wealth and influence inside of the "1 percent." By framing the grievances of people in broad and extensive terms, the organizers helped create a message that resonated with a large audience. The protest was promoted with an image featuring a dancer atop Wall Street's iconic Charging Bull statue. That image helped what ended up defining the movement's visual identity and then gave the protest a memorable symbolic appeal to the public and to the people online. In July, Justine Tunney registered OccupyWallSt.org, which became the main online hub for the movement. The site played an important role in spreading information and coordinating people involved, turning the original call to action into a sustained protest movement.

The U.S. Day of Rage, a group that organized to protest "corporate influence [that] corrupts our political parties, our elections, and the institutions of government", also joined the movement. Its involvement helped bring together Occupy Wall Street to an already up and running network of activists who are focused on the influence of money and all the corporations that embedded in American politics. This support grounded and solidified the protest's early base and increased its visibility to others before it gained national attention from people all around the country. The protest itself began on September 17; from its first day, it attracted all sorts of people, drawn by a feeling of dissatisfaction and disgust for the perceived economic inequality at the time and the consequences of the 2008 financial crisis. A Facebook page for the demonstrations began two days later on September 19 featuring a YouTube video of earlier events.Social media quickly became a major tool for the movement to gain more attention. It allowed organizers and supporters to share near-real time updates on what was happening through images, videos, and calls to action. This digital presence helped this movement reach many different audiences who did not necessarily watch TV and were far beyond the lower Manhattan area. This also encouraged similar demonstrations in other cities. By mid-October, Facebook listed 125 Occupy-related pages. The rapid spread of these pages reflected the speed at which Occupy Wall Street developed from just a small local protest to a major nationwide and even international movement. Online platforms helped the movement shape their identity by using different slogans, visuals, and accounts to see different police responses to these protests. This in turn heavily increased public awareness and participation.

The original location for the protest was One Chase Manhattan Plaza, with Bowling Green Park (the site of the "Charging Bull") and Zuccotti Park as alternate choices. Police discovered this before the protest began and fenced off two locations; but they left Zuccotti Park, the group's third choice, open. Since the park was private property, police could not legally force protesters to leave without being requested to do so by the property owner. At a press conference held the same day the protests began, New York City mayor Michael Bloomberg explained, "people have a right to protest, and if they want to protest, we'll be happy to make sure they have locations to do it."

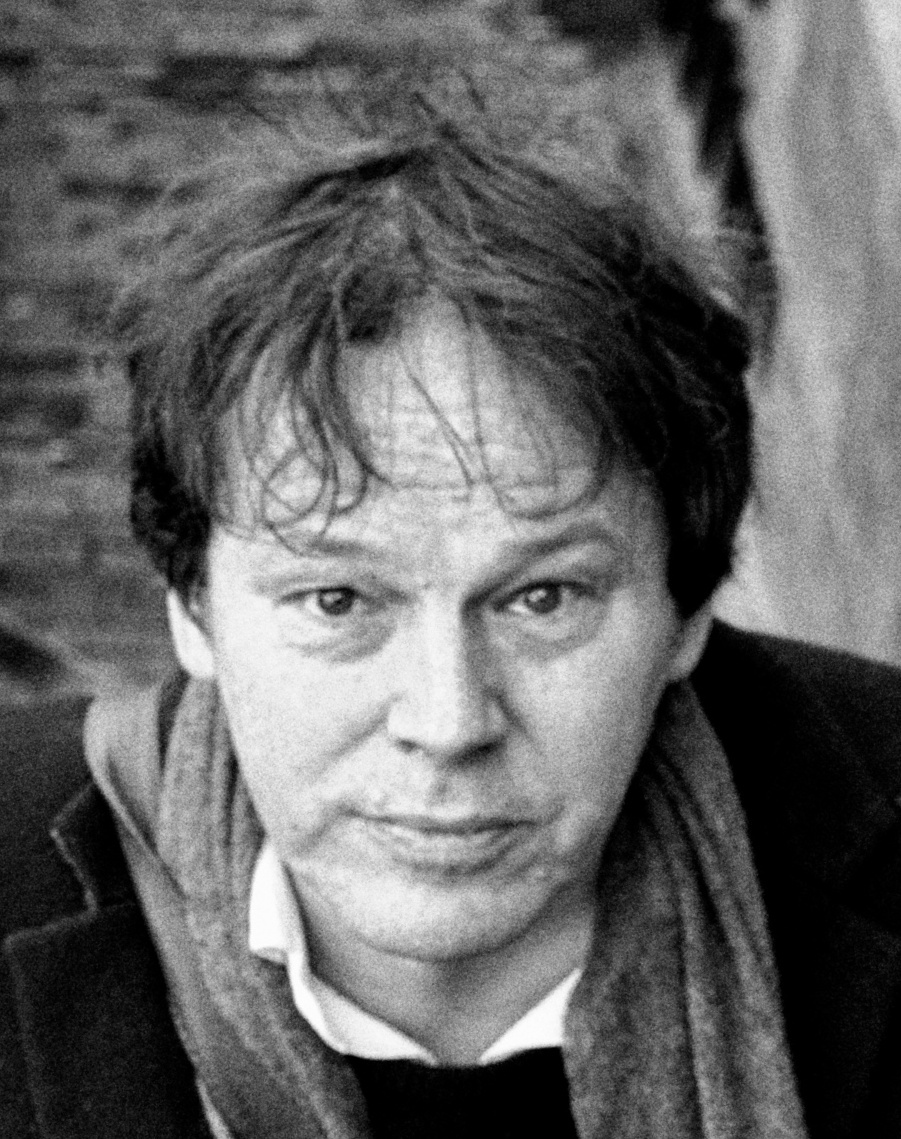
The anthropologist David Graeber played a leading early role in the movement and in the coining of the slogan "We are the 99%".

Antecedent and subsequent OWS prototypes include the British student protests of 2010, 2009-2010 Iranian election protests, the Arab Spring protests, and, more closely related, protests in Chile, Greece, Spain and India. Occupy Wall Street, in turn, gave rise to the Occupy movement in the United States.

Many commentators have stated that the Occupy Wall Street movement has roots in the philosophy of anarchism.

== Background ==
=== "We are the 99%" ===
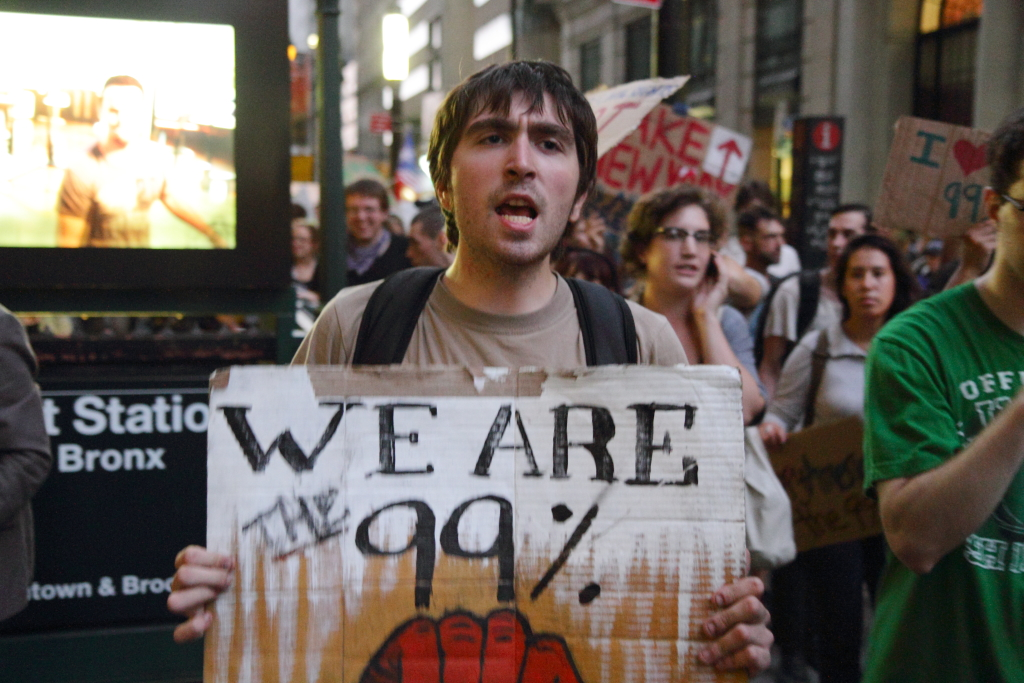
"We Are The 99%"

The Occupy protesters' slogan "We are the 99%" referred to the income disparity in the US and economic inequality in general, which were main issues for OWS. The phrase gave the movement a very simple and very memorable way to show people and express a complex and critique of wealth concentration and a massively unequal political influence. By comparing most of the people in the United States with a small amount of economic elites, the slogan turned ideas about inequity into a different language that was widely understandable and politically powerful. It derived from a "We the 99%" flyer calling for OWS's second General Assembly in August 2011. The variation "We are the 99%" originated from a Tumblr page of the same name. That Tumblr page helped create a more personalized slogan by allowing individuals to share financial difficulties they were going through such as debt, unemployment, financial hardship, and housing insecurity. As a result, this phrase became more than just a statistical claim, serving instead as more of a collective statement of identity for people who felt excluded from economic and political power.Huffington Post reporter Paul Taylor said the slogan was "arguably the most successful slogan since 'Hell no, we won't go!'" of the Vietnam War era, and that the vast majority of Americans saw the income gap as causing social friction. Its success also reflected bigger and broader strategies of communication of Occupy Wall Street, which relied on short, repeatable language that could spread easily through signs, speeches, and different social media. The slogan was boosted by statistics which were confirmed by a Congressional Budget Office (CBO) report released in October 2011. Writing in 2022, historian Gary Gerstle says that the slogan "proved surprisingly appealing" in a nation that, during its neoliberal high point, often denounced ideas of class warfare. Because of this appeal, "We are the 99%" became a defining phrases in the movement Occupy Wall Street. This helped shape many things, such as public discussion of inequality, which went well beyond the protests themselves.

=== Income and wealth inequality ===
A chart showing the disparity in income distribution in the United States. Wealth inequality and income inequality have been central concerns among OWS protesters.

Income inequality and wealth inequality were focal points of the Occupy Wall Street protests. These concerns reflected a much broader and more public debate about whether the benefits of economic growth were truly being shared across society. For a many participants, the issue was not only the economic distance between the rich and the poor, but also the belief that economic inequality was translating to more unequal political power, thus reducing opportunity for regular ordinary citizens. This idea was studied by Arindajit Dube and Ethan Kaplan of the University of Massachusetts Amherst, who noted that "... Only after it became increasingly clear that the political process was unable to enact serious reforms to address the causes or consequences of the economic crisis did we see the emergence of the OWS movement." As a result, inequality became both an economic and democratic issue within the movement's rhetoric. Fear of dollar decline broadened interest in monetary reform.

=== Goals ===
OWS's goals included a reduction in the influence of corporations on politics, more balanced distribution of income, more and better jobs, bank reform (especially to curtail speculative trading by banks), forgiveness of student loan debt or other relief for indebted students, and alleviation of the foreclosure situation. Taken together, these goals can be reflected as the movement's bigger criticism of an economic system than many of people believed favored the financial institutions and wealthy elites over ordinary citizens. Rather than just focusing only on a single policy issue, Occupy Wall Street brought a very wide range of things together such as inequality, debt, unemployment, and political influence. Some media labeled the protests "anti-capitalist", while others disputed the relevance of this label.

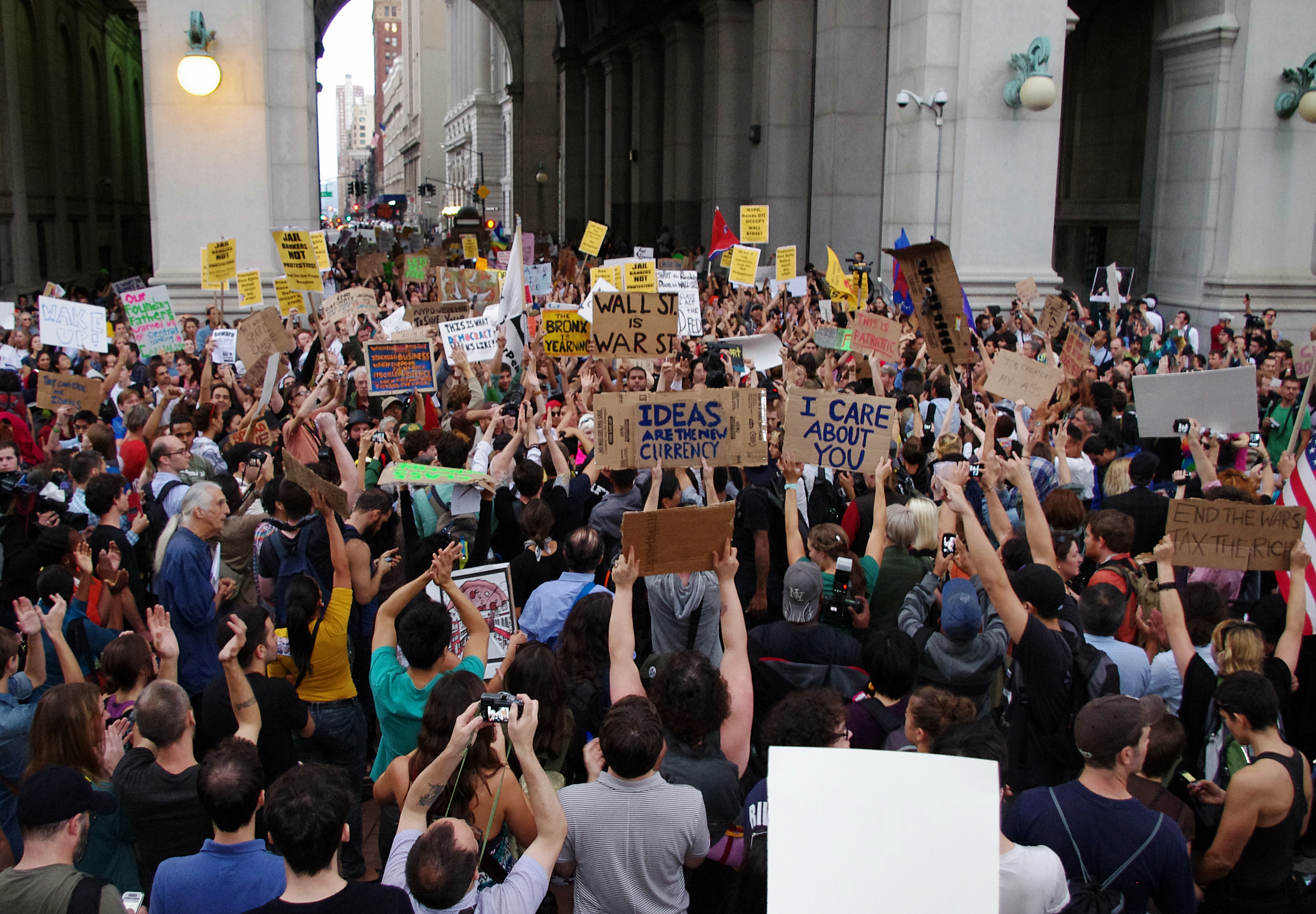
Beginning on September 17, 2011, Zuccotti Park was occupied by protesters.

Some protesters favored a fairly concrete set of national policy proposals. One OWS group that favored specific demands created a document entitled the 99 Percent Declaration, but this was regarded as an attempt to "co-opt" the "Occupy" name, and the document and group were rejected by the General Assemblies of Occupy Wall Street and Occupy Philadelphia. this disagreement illustrated a larger tension between the people inside the movement, such as people who wanted specific legislative demands and other people who believed that it is strength coming from remaining open, decentralized, and very broadly representative.

During the occupation in Liberty Square, a declaration was issued with a list of grievances. The declaration stated that the "grievances are not all-inclusive".

=== Main organization ===
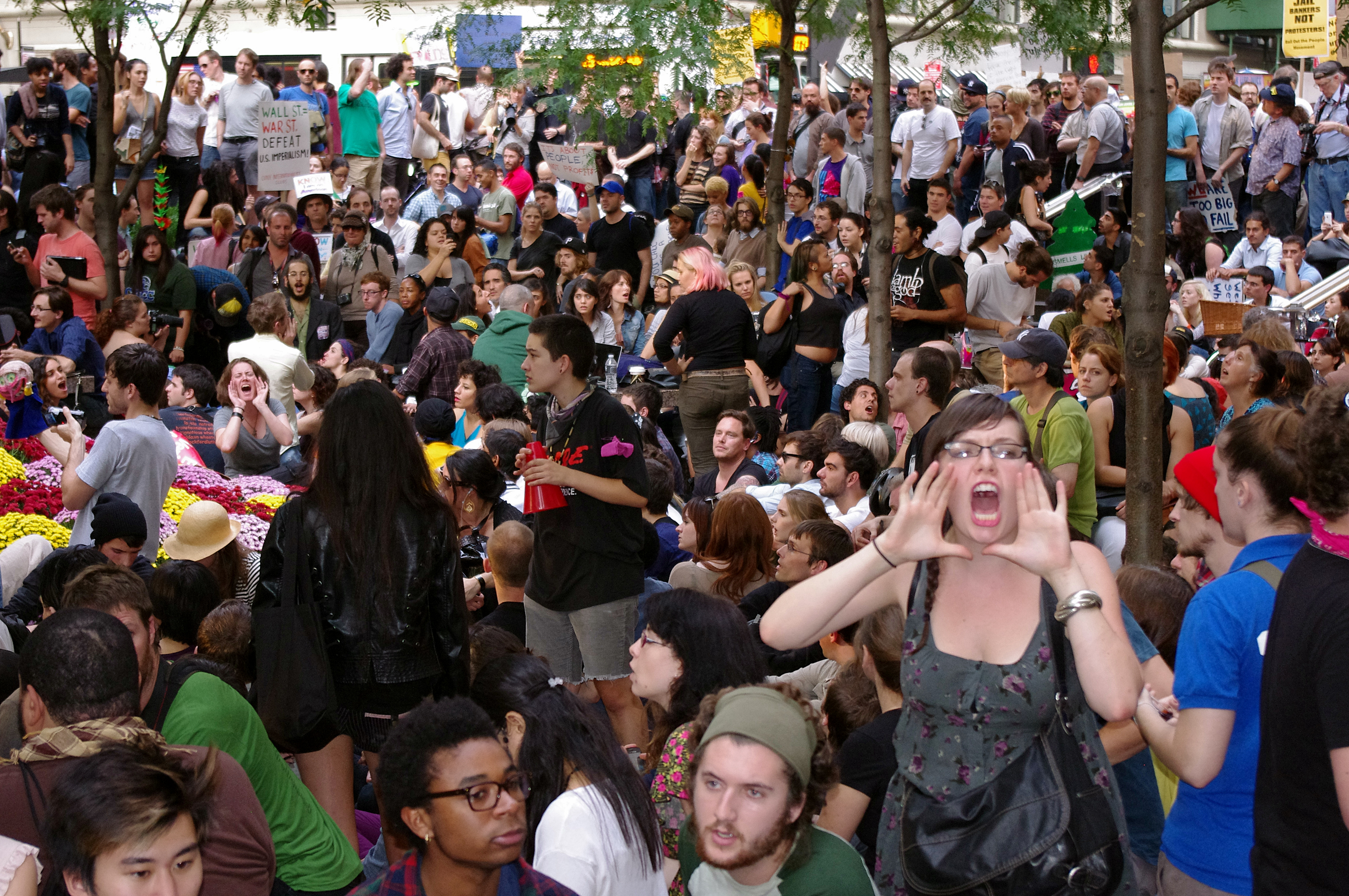
Protesters engaging in the 'human microphone'

The assembly was the main OWS decision-making body and used a modified consensus process, where participants attempted to reach consensus and then dropped to a 9/10 vote if consensus was not reached. This process reflected the movement's commitments to horizontal, participatory democracy, in contrast to traditional top-down leadership. Some of the supporters viewed the General Assembly not only as a practical way to make decisions, but also as a way to model the more inclusive politics that the movement had been advocating for.

Assembly meetings involved OWS working groups and affinity groups, and were open to the public for both attendance and speaking. The meetings lacked formal leadership. Participants commented upon committee proposals using a process called a "stack", which is a queue of speakers that anyone can join. New York used a progressive stack, in which people from marginalized groups are sometimes allowed to speak before people from dominant groups. Facilitators and "stack-keepers" urged speakers to "step forward, or step back" based on which group they belong to, meaning that women and minorities often moved to the front of the line, while white men often had to wait for a turn to speak. The use of progressive stack was intended to make discussion more representative by giving more space to other people's voices that were marginalized in public debates. In this way, the organization of meetings reflected Occupy Wall Street's broader criticism of unequal power relations. In addition to over 70 working groups, the organizational structure also included "spokes councils", at which every working group could participate. The later development of these spokes council's also have shown a good attempt at balancing inclusiveness with efficiency really well, since then the large General Assembly could be slow and difficult for routine decisions. Dr. Ron Suarez and Margarete Koenen were the first two developers of NYCGA.net - the OWS website for internal organization. NYCGA.net used the free, open source BuddyPress plugin for WordPress so that Groups would each have their own respective discussion forums, event calendars, and shared document system. Thus, while the engineering was centralized, content control was decentralized, with Group members on the ground selecting the individuals who would be administrators and moderators for the respective Groups. Volunteers included one of the BuddyPress Lead Developers, Boone Gorges and people as far away as Australia. The complete source code was uploaded to GitHub and used by occupation movements in a number of other cities. One year later, the same website was used during Hurricane Sandy for "Occupy Sandy" to organize disaster relief volunteers. The use of digital tools next to face-to-face assemblies demonstrated how the movement combined online coordination with in-person democratic participation.

=== The People's Library ===
The People's Library at Occupy Wall Street was started a few days after the protest when a pile of books was left in a cardboard box at Zuccotti Park. The books were passed around and organized, and as time passed, it received additional books and resources from readers, private citizens, authors and corporations. The library quickly became one of the most noticeable community institutions inside of the encampment, reflecting the movement's emphasis on education, mutual aid, and the open exchange of ideas. Its informal beginnings also symbolized the participatory spirit of Occupy Wall Street, since ordinary participants helped build and maintain a shared public resource. As of November 2011 the library had 5,554 books cataloged in LibraryThing and its collection was described as including some rare or unique articles of historical interest. According to American Libraries, the library's collection had "thousands of circulating volumes", which included "holy books of every faith, books reflecting the entire political spectrum, and works for all ages on a huge range of topics." This wide range of materials reinforced the library's role as both a practical service for protesters and as a symbol of the movement's commitment to inclusivity and public knowledge. This also demonstrated how the encampment sought to create some alternate civic spaces within the occupation itself.

The library was largely destroyed during the November 15, 2011 raid and, in a court settlement, the City later agreed to pay $360,000 in compensation, including attorney fees. Similarly, the City of New York has since begun settling cases with individual participants. The destruction of the collection drew attention from different librarians, free speech advocates, and supporters who viewed the raid as an attack not just on property but also on a shared cultural and educational project.

There were already libraries in the encampments of Spain and Greece. Following the example of the OWS People's Library, protesters throughout North America and Europe formed sister libraries at their encampments. In this way, the People's Library became a significant part of a broader protest tradition in which libraries served as visible expressions of solidarity, learning, and democratic participation.

== Zuccotti Park encampment ==
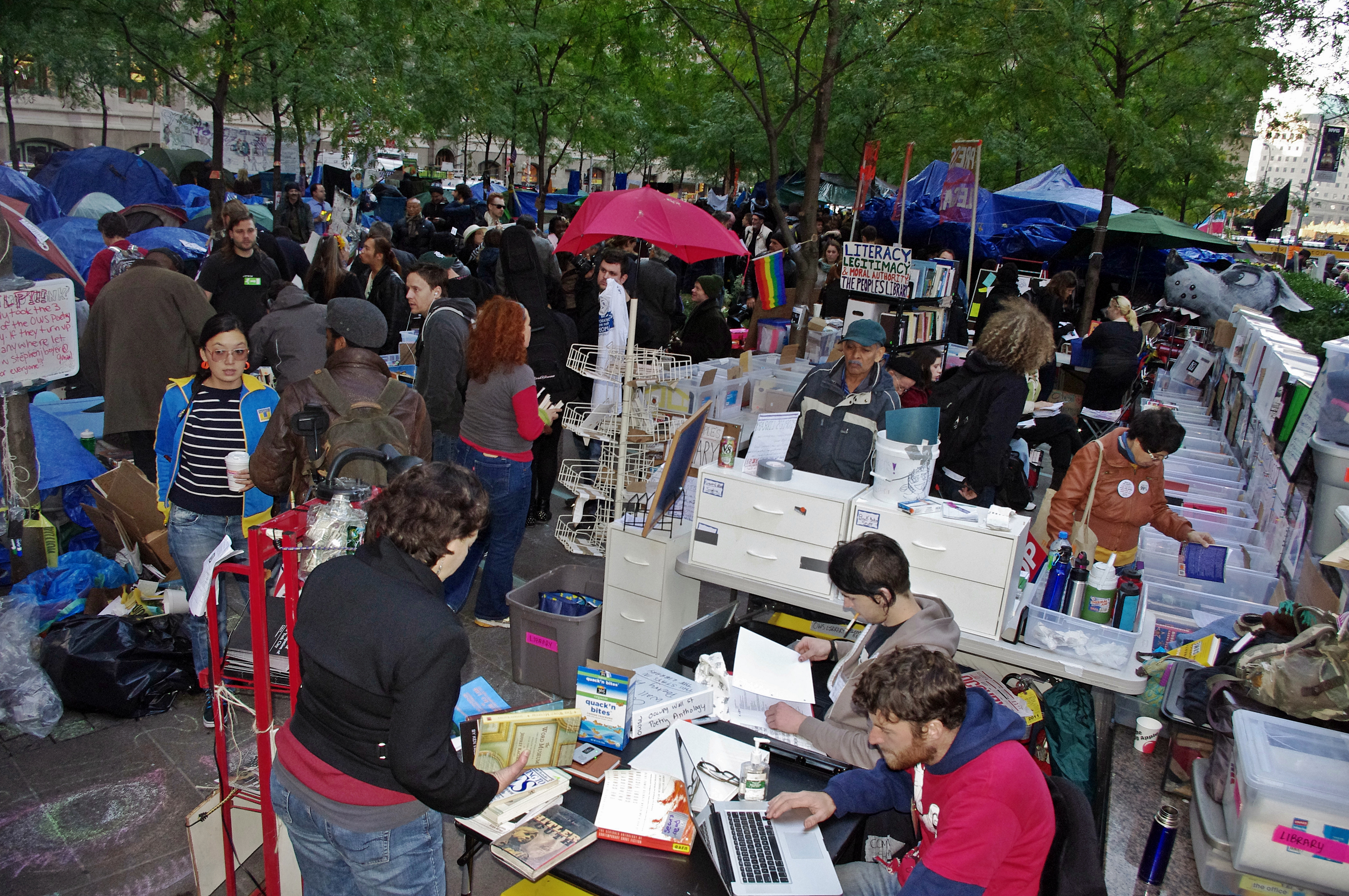
Encampment at Zuccotti Park and "People's Library" with over 5,000 books, wi-fi internet, and a reference service, often staffed by professional librarians, procuring material through the interlibrary loan system

Prior to being closed to overnight use and during the occupation of the space, between 100 and 200 people slept in Zuccotti Park. Initially, tents were not allowed and protesters slept in sleeping bags or under blankets. Meal service started at a total cost of about $1,000 per day. Many protesters used the bathrooms of nearby business establishments. Some supporters donated use of their bathrooms for showers and the sanitary needs of protesters.

New York City requires a permit to use "amplified sound", including electric bullhorns. Since Occupy Wall Street did not have a permit, the protesters created the "human microphone" in which a speaker pauses while the nearby members of the audience repeat the phrase in unison.

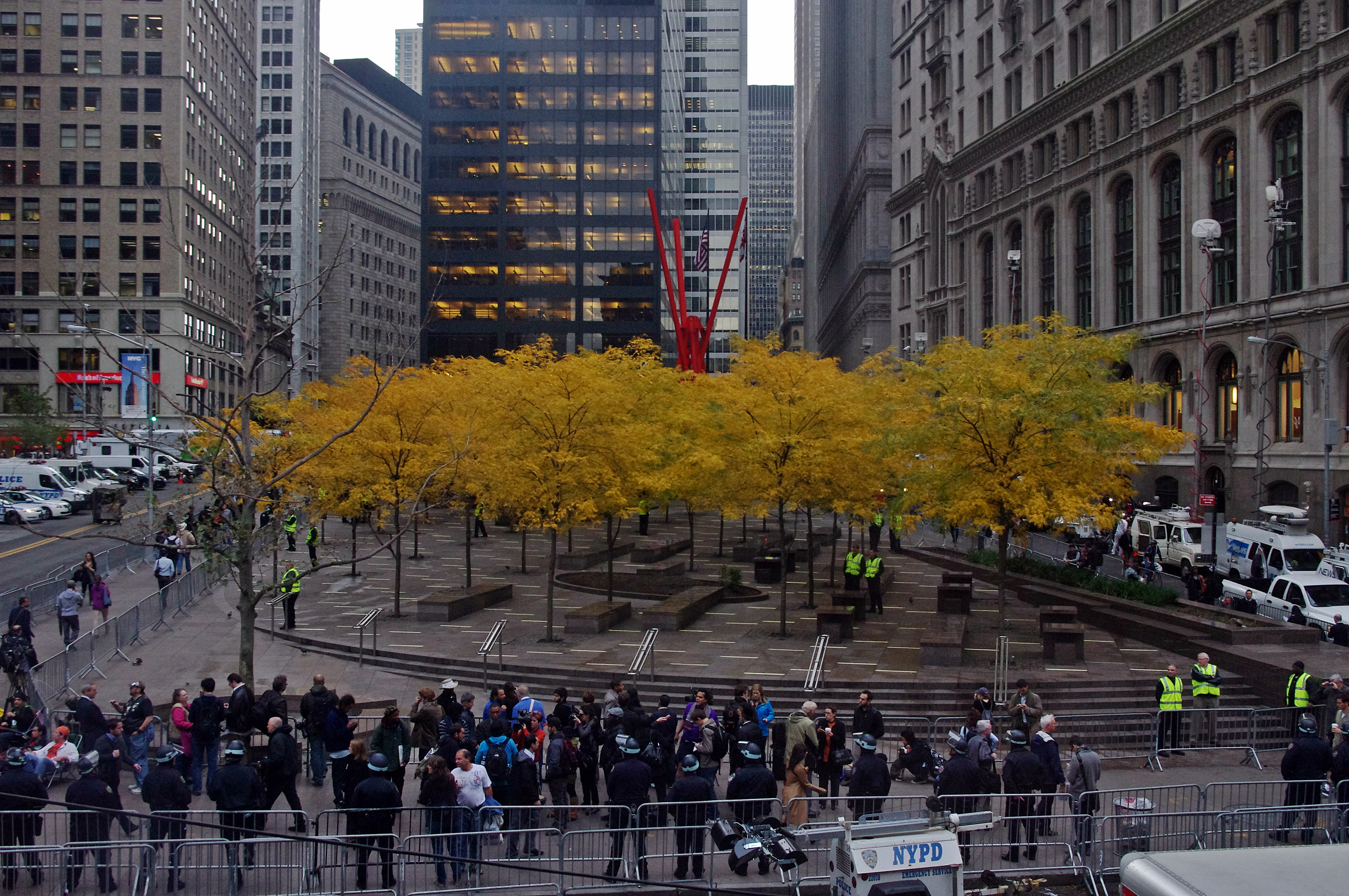
Zuccotti Park, cleared and cleaned on November 15, 2011

On October 13, New York City Mayor Bloomberg and Brookfield Properties announced that the park had to be vacated for cleaning the following morning at 7 am. The next morning, the property owner postponed its cleaning effort. Having prepared for a confrontation with the authorities to prevent the cleaning effort from proceeding, some protesters clashed with police in riot gear outside City Hall after it was canceled.

Shortly after midnight on November 15, 2011, the New York City Police Department gave protesters notice from the park's owner to leave Zuccotti Park due to its purportedly unsanitary and hazardous conditions. The notice stated that they could return without sleeping bags, tarps or tents. About an hour later, police in riot gear began removing protesters from the park, arresting some 200 people in the process, including a number of journalists.

On December 31, 2011, protesters started to re-occupy the park. Police in riot gear started to clear out the park around 1:30 am. Sixty-eight people were arrested in connection with the event, including one accused by media of stabbing a police officer in the hand with a pair of scissors.

When the Zuccotti Park encampment was closed, some former campers were allowed to sleep in local churches. After the closure of the Zuccotti Park encampment, the movement turned its focus on occupying banks, corporate headquarters, board meetings, foreclosed homes, college and university campuses, and Wall Street itself. As of March 15, 2012, since its inception the Occupy Wall Street protests in New York City had cost the city an estimated $17 million in overtime fees to provide policing of protests and the encampment inside Zuccotti Park.

On March 17, 2012, Occupy Wall Street demonstrators attempted to mark the movement's six-month anniversary by reoccupying Zuccotti Park. Protesters were soon cleared away by police, who made over 70 arrests. On March 24, hundreds of OWS protesters marched from Zuccotti Park to Union Square in a demonstration against police violence.

On September 17, 2012, protesters returned to Zuccotti Park to mark the first anniversary of the beginning of the occupation. Protesters blocked access to the New York Stock Exchange as well as other intersections in the area. This, along with several violations of Zuccotti Park rules, led police to surround groups of protesters, at times pulling protesters from the crowds to be arrested for blocking pedestrian traffic. There were 185 arrests across the city.

== Occupy media ==
Adbusters poster of Ms. Chelsea Elliott advertising the original protest

Occupy Wall Street activists disseminated their movement updates through a variety of mediums, including social media, print magazines, newspapers, film, radio and live stream. Like much of Occupy, many of these alternative media projects were collectively managed, while autonomous from the decision-making bodies of Occupy Wall Street.

The Occupied Wall Street Journal (OWSJ) was a free newspaper founded in October 2011 by independent journalists Arun Gupta, Jed Brandt and Michael Levitin. The first issue had a total print run of 70,000 copies, along with an unspecified number in Spanish. Its last article appeared in February 2012.

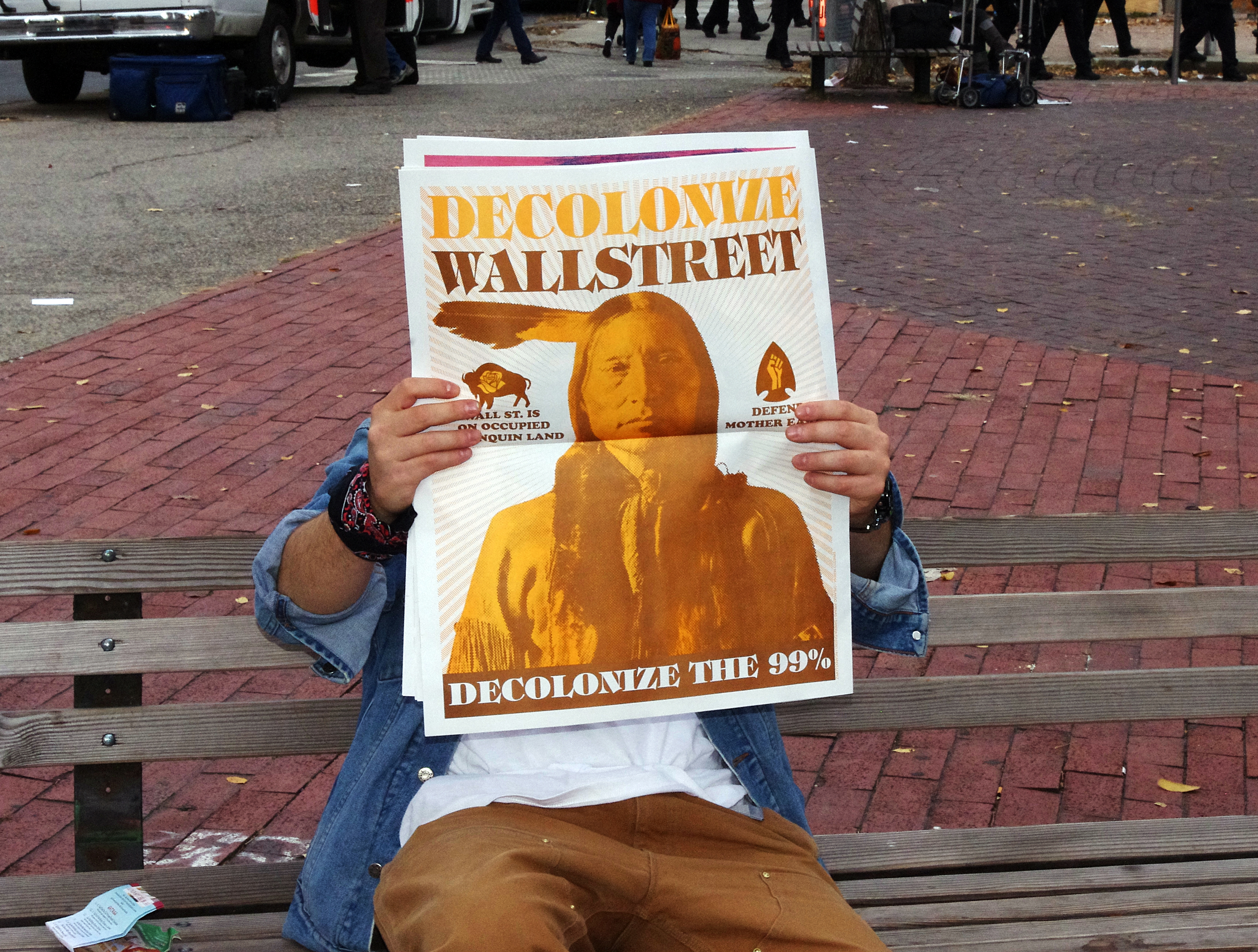
Occupier reading the special edition of Occupied Wall Street, with posters curated by Occuprint

The Occuprint collective, founded by Jesse Goldstein and Josh MacPhee, formed through the curation of the fourth and special edition of The Occupied Wall Street Journal (OWSJ). Afterwards, it continued to collect and publish images under the Creative Commons for non commercial use license, to spread the artwork throughout the movement.

The Occupy! Gazette was founded by editors Astra Taylor, Keith Gessen of n+1 and Sarah Leonard of Dissent Magazine. It published five issues from October 2011 to September 2012, with a commemorative sixth issue published in May 2014, to support OWS activist Cecily McMillan during the sentencing phase of her trial.

Tidal: Occupy Theory, Occupy Strategy magazine was published twice a year, with its first release in December 2011, its fourth and final issue being released in March 2013. It consisted of long essays, poetry and art within thirty pages. Each issue had a circulation of 12,000 to 50,000.

In Front and Center: Critical Voices in the 99% was a fully-online publication managed by an editorial collective of OWS participants. It featured critical essays and reflections from within OWS, aiming to put the voices, experiences and issues of oppressed and marginalized communities in the front and center of the Occupy movement. It is still available online.

== Security, crime and legal issues ==
OWS demonstrators complained of thefts of assorted items such as cell phones and laptops; thieves also stole $2,500 of donations that were stored in a makeshift kitchen. In November, a man was arrested for breaking an EMT's leg. These incidents became part of a broader public debate over safety and order in the encampment. Critics argued that the occupation became very difficult to police, and some people responded that such problems were used to discredit the movement as a whole. Crime at Zuccotti Park was frequently cited by city officials and in press coverage as pressure grew to clear the site.

After several weeks of occupation, protesters had made enough allegations of rape, sexual assault, and gropings that women-only sleeping tents were set up. Occupy Wall Street organizers released a statement regarding the sexual assaults stating, "As individuals and as a community, we have the responsibility and the opportunity to create an alternative to this culture of violence. We are working for an OWS and a world in which survivors are respected and supported unconditionally ... We are redoubling our efforts to raise awareness about sexual violence. This includes taking preventive measures such as encouraging healthy relationship dynamics and consent practices that can help to limit harm." The allegations also exposed tensions between the movement's ideals about the openness and the practical difficulties of maintaining safety in a big area, that is a loosely organized protest camp. At the same time though, legal disputes surround the encampment extended not just in the camp but beyond internal security concerns, as conflicts over park access, sanitation, and overnight occupation became a massive reason for justifying the removal of the protesters from Zuccotti Park.

== Government crackdowns ==
=== Surveillance ===
An internal document of the United States Department of Homeland Security showed that the U.S. government was closely monitoring protesters.

As the movement spread across the United States, the United States Department of Homeland Security (DHS) began keeping tabs on protesters, under the pretext that the protest was a potential locus of violence. Following this, there was a DHS report entitled "SPECIAL COVERAGE: Occupy Wall Street", dated October 2011, observed that "mass gatherings associated with public protest movements can have disruptive effects on transportation, commercial, and government services, especially when staged in major metropolitan areas." The DHS keeps a file on the movement and monitors social media for information.

On December 21, 2012, Partnership for Civil Justice obtained and published U.S. government documents revealing that over a dozen local FBI field offices, DHS and other federal agencies monitored Occupy Wall Street, despite labeling it a peaceful movement. The New York Times reported in May 2014 that declassified documents showed extensive surveillance of OWS-related groups across the country.

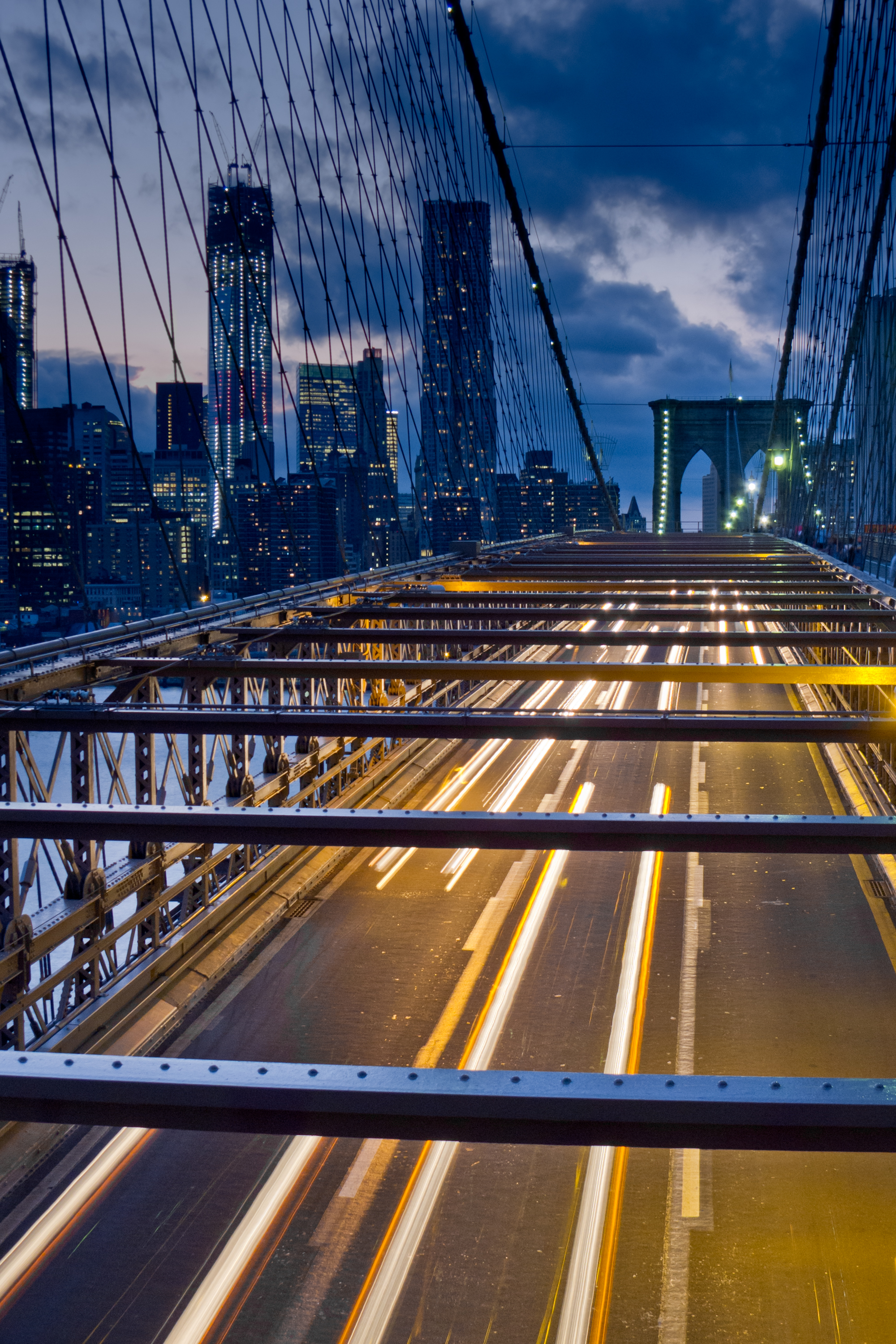
Site where the Brooklyn Bridge Arrest took place

=== Arrests ===
The first person arrested was Alexander Arbuckle, a student videographer from New York University engaged in a class project. The police department alleged he was blocking the street. However, video shown at his trial showed the protesters including Arbuckle, had followed police orders and withdrew to the sidewalk. His case would become an early example cited by supporters who would argue that some arrests during the Occupy Wall Street reflected overly aggressive policing rather than just taking care of and clearing out the threats to public order. It also drew attention to the role of video evidence in challenging the official police reports of protestor activity.

Gideon Oliver, who represented Occupy with the National Lawyers Guild in New York, said about 2,000 [protesters] had been arrested just in New York City alone. Most of these arrests in New York and elsewhere, were on charges of disorderly conduct, trespassing, and failure to disperse. Nationally, a little under 8,000 Occupy-affiliated arrests were documented by tallying numbers published in local newspapers. The scale of these arrests was showed how policing became one of the central experiences of the Occupy movement, especially since demonstrators were spreading not just in Zuccotti Park but beyond Aswell, turning into marches, bridge crossings, and actions at banks, universities, and many other public spaces. A major amount of mass arrests also drew more media coverage, to the movement's benefit. In some cases, they generated sympathy among observers who saw these police responses as disproportionate.

In a report that followed an eight-month study, researchers at the law schools of NYU and Fordham accused the NYPD of deploying unnecessarily aggressive force, obstructing press freedoms and making arbitrary and baseless arrests.

==== Brooklyn Bridge arrests ====
On October 1, 2011, a large group of protesters set out to walk across the Brooklyn Bridge, resulting in 768 arrests; the largest number of arrests in one day at any Occupy event. By October 2, all but 20 of the arrestees had been released with citations for disorderly conduct and a criminal court summons. On October 4, a group of protesters who were arrested on the bridge filed a lawsuit against the city, alleging that officers had violated their constitutional rights by luring them into a trap and then arresting them.

In June 2012, a federal judge ruled that the protesters had not received sufficient warning.

=== Court cases ===
Video of Alexander Arbuckle's arrest was convincing evidence in his acquittal.

In 2011, eight men associated with Occupy Wall Street were found guilty of trespassing, having intended to set up a camp on property controlled by Trinity Church. One was also convicted of attempted criminal mischief and attempted criminal possession of burglar's tools for trying to slice a lock on a chain-link fence with bolt cutters, spending a month in prison. The rest were sentenced to community service.

In May 2012, three cases in a row were thrown out of court, the most recent one for "insufficient summons".

One defendant, Michael Premo, charged with assaulting an officer, was found not guilty after the defense presented video evidence which "showed officers charging into the defendant unprovoked", contradicting the sworn testimony of NYPD officers.

In April 2014, the final Occupy court case, the Trial of Cecily McMillan began. Cecily McMillan was charged with and convicted of assaulting a police officer and sentenced to 90 days in Rikers Island Penitentiary. McMillan claimed the assault was an accident and a response to what she claimed to be a sexual assault at the hands of said officer. The jury that found her guilty recommended no jail time. She was released after serving 60 days.

== Notable responses ==
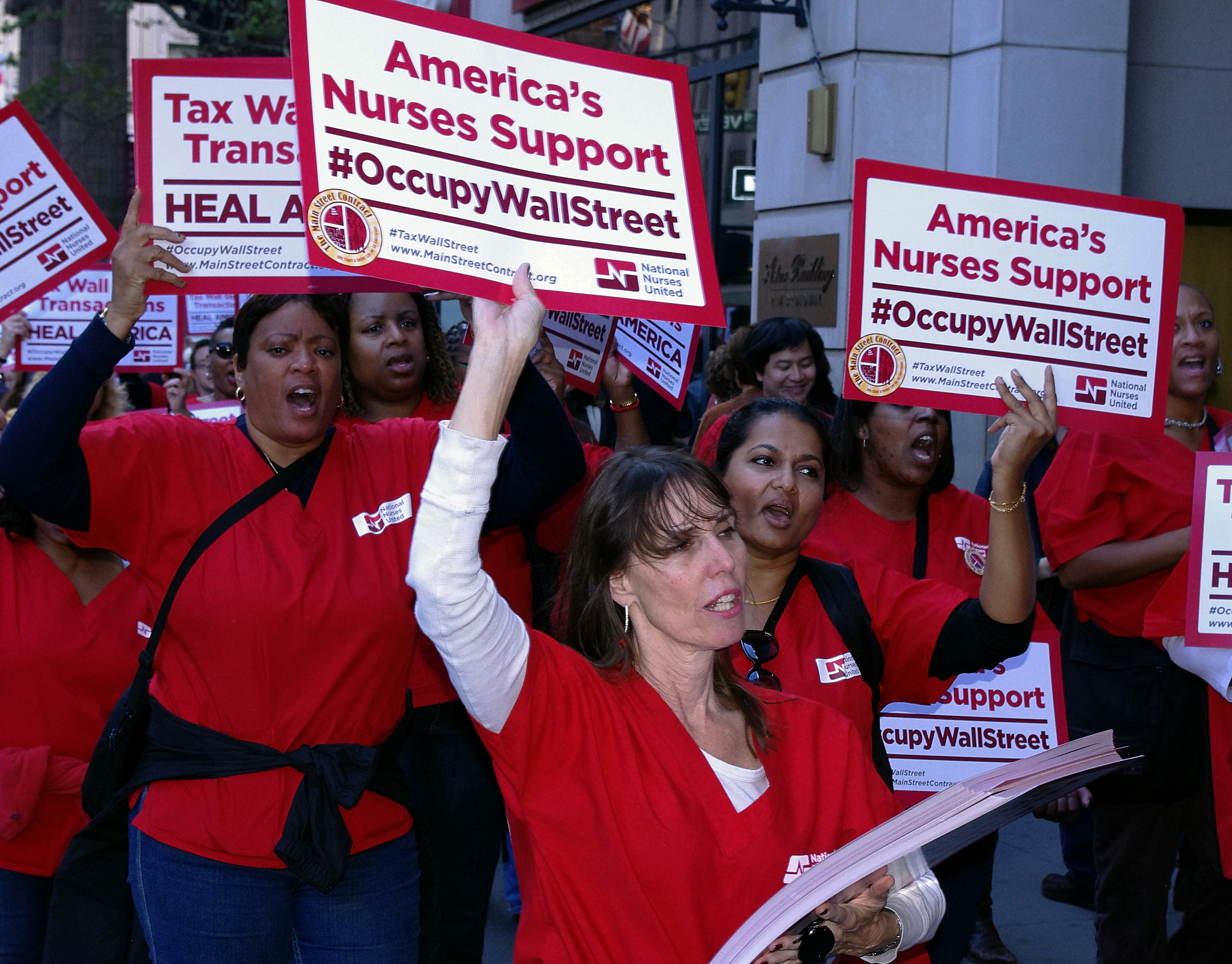
October 5, 2011, in Foley Square, members of National Nurses United labor union supporting OWS

During an October 6 news conference, President Barack Obama said, "I think it expresses the frustrations the American people feel, that we had the biggest financial crisis since the Great Depression, huge collateral damage all throughout the country ... and yet you're still seeing some of the same folks who acted irresponsibly trying to fight efforts to crack down on the abusive practices that got us into this in the first place."

On October 5, 2011, noted commentator and political satirist Jon Stewart said in his Daily Show broadcast: "If the people who were supposed to fix our financial system had actually done it, the people who have no idea how to solve these problems wouldn't be getting shit for not offering solutions."

Republican presidential candidate Mitt Romney said that while there were "bad actors" that needed to be "found and plucked out", he believed that targeting one industry or region of America is a mistake, and said the Occupy Wall Street protests were "dangerous" and incited "class warfare". A week later, Romney expressed empathy for the movement, saying, "I look at what's happening on Wall Street and my view is, boy, I understand how those people feel."

House Democratic Leader Rep. Nancy Pelosi said she supports the Occupy Wall Street movement. In September, various labor unions, including the Transport Workers Union of America Local 100 and the New York Metro 32BJ Service Employees International Union, pledged their support for demonstrators.

In November 2011, Public Policy Polling did a national survey which found that 33% of voters supported OWS and 45% opposed it, with 22% not sure. 43% of those polled had a higher opinion of the Tea Party movement than the Occupy movement. In January 2012, a survey was released by Rasmussen Reports, in which 51% of likely voters found protesters to be a public nuisance, while 39% saw it as a valid protest movement representing the people.

Many notable figures joined the occupation, including David Crosby, Kanye West, Russell Simmons, Alec Baldwin, Susan Sarandon, Don King, Noam Chomsky, Jesse Jackson, Cornel West, Judith Butler, and Michael Moore.

OWS was mentioned by Time magazine in its 2011 selection of "The Protester" as Person of the Year.

== Criticism ==
The Occupy Movement has been criticized for not having a set of clear demands that could be used to prompt formal policy change. This lack of agenda has been cited as the reason why the Occupy Movement fizzled before achieving any specific legislative changes. Although the lack of demands has simultaneously been argued as one of the advantages of the movement, the Occupy protesters rejected the idea of having only one demand, or a set of demands, and instead represented a host of broad demands that did not specifically allude to a desired policy agenda.

Although the movement's primary slogan was "We are the 99%", it was criticized for not encompassing the voice of the entire 99%, specifically lower-class individuals and minorities. For example, it was characterized as being "overwhelmingly white". The lack of African-American presence was especially notable, with the movement being criticized in several news outlets and journal articles for its lack of black protestors.

Some publications mentioned that the Occupy Wall Street Movement failed to spark any true institutional changes in banks and in Corporate America. This idea is supported by the scandals that continued to emerge following the 2008 financial crisis such as the London whale incident, the Libor scandal, and the HSBC money laundering - all publicized in 2012. Furthermore, the idea of excess compensation through salaries and bonuses at Wall Street banks continued to be a contentious topic following the Occupy protests, especially as bonuses increased during a period of falling bank profits.

The movement was also criticized for not building a sustainable base of support and instead fading quickly after its initial spark in late 2011 through early 2012. This may be attributed to Occupy's lack of legislative victories, which left the protestors with a lack of measurable goals. It was also argued that the movement was too tied to its base, Zuccotti Park. Evidence of this lies in the fact that when the police evicted the protestors on November 15, the movement largely dissipated. While there is evidence that the movement had an enduring impact, protests and direct mentions of the Occupy movement quickly became uncommon.

Some Occupy Wall Street protests included slogans and signage such as "Jews control Wall Street" or "Zionist Jews who are running the big banks and the Federal Reserve". As a result, the Occupy movement has been confronted with accusations of antisemitism by major US media outlets and US politicians.

A 2017 book released by Brookings Institution senior fellow Richard V. Reeves called Dream Hoarders: How the American Upper Middle Class Is Leaving Everyone Else in the Dust, Why That Is a Problem, and What to Do about It, presented data which showed that "more than a third of the demonstrators on the May Day 'Occupy' march in 2011 had annual earnings of more than $100,000. But, rather than looking up in envy and resentment, the upper middle class would do well to look at their own position compared to those falling further and further behind."

== Subsequent activity ==
Occupy Wall Street mounted an ambitious call for a citywide general strike and day of action on May 1, 2012. Tens of thousands of people participated in a march through New York City, demonstrating continued support for Occupy Wall Street's cause and concerns.

Occupy Sandy was an organized relief effort created to assist the victims of Hurricane Sandy in the northeastern United States, made up of former and present Occupy Wall Street protesters, other members of the Occupy movement, and former non-Occupy volunteers.

To celebrate the third anniversary of the occupation of Zuccotti Park, an Occupy Wall Street campaign called "Strike Debt" announced it had wiped out almost $4 million in student loans, amounting to the indebtedness of 2,761 students. The loans were all held by students of Everest College, a for profit college that operates Corinthian Colleges, Inc. which in turn owns Everest University, Everest Institute, Heald College, and WyoTech. Strike Debt, and a successor organization, The Debt Collective, were active in organizing the Corinthian 100 students who struck against Corinthian college, a for-profit school that was shut down by the U.S. Department of Education.

Occupy the SEC came together during the occupation. The group seeks to represent the 99% in the regulatory process. They first attracted attention in 2012 when they submitted a 325-page comment letter on the Volcker Rule portion of Dodd Frank.

Another offshoot of the Occupy Movement, calling itself the OWS Alternative Banking Group, was established during the occupation of Zuccotti Park in 2011.

=== Influences ===
Writing in Salon, David Sirota, a progressive political commentator, compared The Dark Knight Rises (2012) and the game Call of Duty to 1980s popular culture reflecting the political period of the time, accusing them of perpetuating a conservative agenda: "Just as so many 1980s pop culture products reflected the spirit of the Reagan Revolution's conservative backlash, we are now seeing two blockbuster, genre-shaping products not-so-subtly reflect the Tea Party's rhetorical backlash to the powerful Occupy Wall Street zeitgeist." This supposed conservatism was also noted by Occupy Wall Street leader David Graeber who stated that the film "really is a piece of anti-Occupy propaganda". An article in Variety reported Chuck Dixon, the cocreator of the Bane character, as saying that Bane is "far more akin to an Occupy Wall Street type if you're looking to cast him politically."

In 2013, commentators described Occupy Wall Street as having influenced the fast food worker strikes. Occupy Wall Street organizers also contributed to a worker campaign at Hot & Crusty cafe in New York City, helping them obtain higher wages and the right to form a union by working with a worker center; the collaboration between the striking workers and Occupy Wall Street protestors is documented in the 2014 film The Hand That Feeds. Occupy Wall Street has been credited with reintroducing a strong emphasis on income inequality into broad political discourse and, relatedly, for inspiring the fight for a $15 minimum wage.

In 2014, the movement inspired two former debt collections executives Craig Antico and Jerry Ashton to create Undue Medical Debt, a charity that buys up delinquent medical debt at pennies on the dollar, just as debt collectors do – meaning even small donations to the charity have a big impact.

In 2021, on the 10th anniversary of Occupy Wall Street, The Atlantic listed several long-term influences of the protests, including "Reinventing Activism" by encouraging "a generation to take to the streets and demand systemic reforms", influencing the Green New Deal, influencing activism for higher minimum wages, and "shifting the window of what is deemed politically acceptable discourse and pulling the nation to the left."

In April of 2024, Columbia University student protestors, including those from Students for Justice in Palestine and Jewish Voice for Peace, set up the "Gaza Solidarity Encampment" in solidarity with Palestinians in the ongoing Gaza genocide. Parallels have been drawn between the tactical and organizational choices in both protests, including the teach-ins, sit-ins, People's Libraries, and art events, as well as the incorporation of direct democracy. At one of the teach-ins, former Occupy organizer Marisa Holmes spoke.

== See also ==
- Reactions to Occupy Wall Street
  - Protest paradigm in OWS media coverage
- Left-wing populism
- 1932 Bonus army
- 1968 Poor People's Campaign
- 15 October 2011 global protests
- 2011 protests in Spain
- 2011 United States public employee protests
- 2011 Wisconsin protests
- 2013 protests in Brazil
- 2013 protests in Turkey
- 2014 Hong Kong protests
- Occupy Galle Face
- Capitol Hill Occupied Protest
- GameStop short squeeze
- List of incidents of civil unrest in the United States
- List of Occupy movement topics
- List of protests in the 21st century
- Nuit Debout
- Post-democracy
- Radical media
- UC Davis pepper spray incident
