= The Age of the Crisis of Man =

2015 book by Mark Greif

- Author: Mark Greif
- Subjects: American literature, American history, comparative literature
- Publisher: Princeton University Press
- Publication date: 2015
- Pages: 448
- ISBN: 9780691146393

The Age of the Crisis of Man: Thought and Fiction in America, 1933–1973 is a historical treatment of fiction, culture, and evolving ideology in American life written by Mark Greif and published by the Princeton University Press.
