= The Art of Fielding =

2011 novel by Chad Harbach

- Author: Chad Harbach
- Cover artist: Keith Hayes
- Language: English
- Publisher: Little, Brown and Company
- Publication date: September 2011
- Publication place: United States
- Media type: Print (hardback)
- Pages: 544
- ISBN: 978-0-316-12667-0

The Art of Fielding is a 2011 novel by American author Chad Harbach. It centers on the fortunes of shortstop Henry Skrimshander and his career playing college baseball with the fictional Westish College Harpooners. The novel was nominated for the Guardian First Book Award, and was featured on several year-end lists.

== Plot ==
Henry Skrimshander begins the novel as a 17-year-old playing on a Legion baseball team in Lankton, South Dakota. Although physically short and not muscular, Henry has an unusual gift for fielding, and excels at the demanding position of shortstop. After playing a game against a team from Chicago, Westish College student Mike Schwartz sees Henry play and recruits him to attend Westish and improve the baseball team. By his junior year, Henry is excelling as a player (especially on defense) and is drawing significant attention from Major League Baseball scouts.

Westish College is a small liberal arts college located in northeastern Wisconsin on the shore of Lake Michigan. The school has a particular attachment to author Herman Melville, ever since a Westish student named Guert Affenlight discovered that Melville had visited Westish as part of a lecturing tour in the 1880s. The school re-branded itself around the Melville visit, erecting a statue of the author and renaming its sports teams as the Harpooners. After publishing a well-received book and spending many years as a professor at Harvard, Affenlight returns to his alma mater as president of the college. His estranged daughter Pella comes to live with him during Henry's junior year, after leaving her architect husband and life in San Francisco.

Much of the novel focuses around members of the Westish baseball team, during their best season in the history of the college. As Henry approaches the NCAA record for most consecutive errorless games by a shortstop (held by his baseball hero, Aparicio Rodriguez), a throw of his goes awry and hits his roommate, right fielder Owen Dunne, who is sitting in the dugout at the time. Owen is hospitalized by the injury, an incident which shakes Henry's confidence deeply. His fielding quickly deteriorates to the point where he can no longer complete a simple throw to first base. Examples given in the novel of Major League players with similar situations are Steve Blass, Mackey Sasser, Mark Wohlers, Chuck Knoblauch, Steve Sax, and Rick Ankiel.

Off the baseball field, the novel explores the relationships between several pairs of people. This includes romantic relationships between Mike Schwartz and Pella Affenlight, as well as one between Owen Dunne and Guert Affenlight. The mentor-student relationship between Schwartz and Henry also comes to the forefront, as each examines their hopes for the future and the extent to which it rests on their baseball ability.

== Reception ==
A great deal of publicity focused on the story of the book's publication, as Harbach worked on the novel, his debut, for ten years, subsequently receiving an advance of more than $650,000 after a bidding war for the publishing rights.

The book was well received, making The New York Times bestseller list and was named one of the ten best books of 2011 from the newspaper. Amazon.com named it one of Best Books for the Month of September 2011 and later named it the Best Book of that year. "The Art of Fielding belongs in the upper echelon of anybody’s league, in this case alongside Bernard Malamud’s The Natural, Scott Lasser’s Battle Creek and W.P. Kinsella’s Shoeless Joe." However, not all press was in praise of the book, with some criticizing its lightness.

=== Accolades ===
The Art of Fielding was shortlisted for the Guardian First Book Award in 2012, although the book Yellow Birds by Kevin Powers ultimately won.

== Adaptations ==
In August 2011, it was reported that HBO was in talks to develop the novel into a television drama. Scott Rudin was attached as executive producer, with Harbach to serve as a consulting producer.

In May 2017, it was reported that IMG and Mandalay Sports Media would be adapting the novel into a movie. Craig Johnson will be directing and Tripper Clancy writing the script.

== Controversy ==
In September 2017, writer Charles C. Green sued Chad Harbach claiming "large-scale misappropriation" by Harbach. The suit noted a very strong plot and style resemblance between The Art of Fielding and Green's previously completed screenplay, Bucky's 9th. In July 2018, Green's suit was dismissed, though he claimed he intends to appeal.
