= There Once Lived a Woman Who Tried to Kill Her Neighbor's Baby =

Short stories by Ludmilla Petrushevskaya

There Once Lived a Woman Who Tried to Kill Her Neighbor's Baby: Scary Fairytales
- 2009 book jacket
- Author: Lyudmila Petrushevskaya ⋅
- Translator: Keith Gessen, Anna Summers
- Genre: Short stories
- Set in: Soviet Union, Russia
- Publisher: Penguin Books
- Publication date: 2009
- Publication place: United States, United KIngdom
- Media type: Print, e-book, audio
- Pages: 206
- Awards: New York Times Bestseller, The World Fantasy Award
- ISBN: 9780143114666 9781524704407
- OCLC: 318411330

There Once Lived a Woman Who Tried to Kill Her Neighbor's Baby: Scary Fairytales is a collection of short stories written by Russian author and playwright Ludmilla Petrushevskaya. These stories were selected and translated from the Russian language into English by Keith Gessen and Anna Summers. Additionally, Gessen and Summers wrote the Introduction. This English translation was published in 2009 by Penguin Books.

== Synopsis ==
This book consists of nineteen short stories that chronicle the harsh and ironic realities of life in the Soviet Union by mixing these realities with fictional elements that advance the various plots. However, "scary fairy tales" has been added to the book's title to underscore the fairytale and horror tropes that are in play. According to Dissent magazine, "What is shocking and memorable about the stories is not the sudden, supernatural junctures but the utterly bleak and believable details of the character’s lives." The stories usually depict skillful adaptation and resilience culminating in forgiveness and love amidst the harsh realities of Soviet Russia. According to The Independent, Petrushevskaya's stories are considered to be honest and bleak but not political, which perhaps made them all the more subversive and officially unacceptable in the Soviet Union before Gorbachev and the Soviet Glasnost.

== Reviews ==
This collection of short stories has received positive reviews.

According to The New York Times, "Timeless and troubling, these “scary fairy tales” grapple with accidents of fate and weaknesses of human nature that exact a heavy penance." The New York Times also says that these stories are "short, highly concentrated, inventive and disturbing, her tales inhabit a borderline between this world and the next, a place where vengeance and grace may be achieved only in dreams."

Dissent magazine says: "The collection’s atmospheric visions of ghosts and dreams mix with the harsh realities of injured soldiers and overworked mothers. Petrushevskaya leverages the fantastical against the tangible—and utterly realistic—difficulties of life in both the USSR and contemporary Russia."

The Guardian says: "A magnificent collection of urban folk tales from one of Russia's most accomplished writers...[and] dense with twists...[the stories] read like condensed Tim Burton or Terry Gilliam horror films, set in wintry Siberian forests and claustrophobic Soviet-era one-room apartments peopled by several generations and writhing with cats."

== Accolades ==
According to the publisher's website, this book received the following accolades:

- New York Times Bestseller
- The World Fantasy Award. This award was also noted by The Independent.
- One of New York magazine’s 10 Best Books of the Year
- One of NPR’s 5 Best Works of Foreign Fiction.
