= The Time: Night =

1992 novella by Lyudmila Petrushevskaya

- Cover of the 2000 Northwestern University Press edition
- Author: Lyudmila Petrushevskaya
- Translator: Sally Laird
- Language: Russian/English
- Genre: Fiction
- Publication date: 1992
- Publication place: Russia
- Media type: Print
- Pages: 155

The Time: Night (Russian: Время ночь) is a novella by Russian author Lyudmila Petrushevskaya. It was originally published in Russian in the literary journal Novy Mir in 1992 and translated into English by Sally Laird in 1994. In 1992 it was shortlisted for the Russian Booker Prize.

== Plot summary ==
The Time: Night follows the struggles of the matriarchal Anna Andrianovna as she holds together an emotionally unstable and financially decrepit family in early post soviet Russia. Writing in first-person, Petrushevskaya presents the novella as a manuscript Anna's family finds after her death, and into which she poured the frustration and sheer power of her parenthood. Anna's struggles throughout to reconcile her intense love for her family with their parasitic lifestyles. The opening pages introduce Anna's daughter, Alyona, through a brief stolen segment of her diary, unveiling her chronic promiscuity and destructive incompetence. Alyona's rambunctious toddler, Tima, for whom Anna shows riveting affection aion, accompanies his grandmother during his mother's escapades. Anna's ex-convict son Andrei makes intermittent appearances at her communal apartment, looking for food and booze money. As the manuscript progresses, Petrushevskaya reveals the pitiful and terminal condition of Anna's mother in a mental hospital, and another illegitimate child of Alyona's. The narrative concludes with Alyona fleeing from the apartment with her children in the night.

== Characters ==
Anna Andrianovna
Unsuccessful poet and narrator of the novella. Clinging to the Russian literary tradition of the self-sacrificing matriarch or babushka, Anna views her life as a grand epic. Her self-centered delusions strain her relationship with her family, especially her daughter, Alyona.
Alyona
Anna's daughter. With multiple children by multiple fathers, she is derided by her mother for her every action. However, this very criticism belies just how similar Alyona and Anna truly are.
Andrei
Anna's son. A troublemaker who often uses Anna for shelter and money.
Tima
Alyona's young son. Throughout most of the novella, is cared for by Anna, who dotes on him in an alarming and at times sexual manner.
Sima
Anna's mother. Lives in a state home, but flashbacks highlight her uneasy relationship with her daughter.

== Major Themes ==
Story Telling-The protagonist, Anna Andrianovna, takes great pride in identifying herself as a storyteller and poet. Anna presents her tale as the story of her daughter, Alyona, and to some extent her son and grandchildren. She even sometimes goes so far as to write in her own version of Alyona's voice. Though she presents her tale as the story of her children's lives, as the novel progresses, it becomes apparent that the story is not about Anna's children, but about Anna herself and the way she relates them.

Motherhood- Three generations of motherhood are present in the novel. The relationship most thoroughly explored is the one between Anna and her daughter Alyona. This relationship as depicted by Anna seems tumultuous and fraught with drama. However, as the novel progresses, the reader sees that Anna's portrayal of her relationship with her daughter is accurate only in so far as it is a reflection of her relationship with her own mother. The novel ends on a redemptive note in which Anna shows that she is willing to forfeit everything- perhaps even her sanity- for her aging mother, and Alyona finds the strength to break away from the domineering Anna in order to be a better mother to her own children.

Gender/ Sexuality- All of the major characters in the novel are female. The male characters that do exist are often portrayed as untrustworthy, or are using the female characters for money, sex, or some other object. Additionally, both Anna and Alyona are unrelentingly chastised by their mothers for their choices in partners. This creates a tension between the male and female characters, and often drives the male characters from the apartment, the main space of the novel.

Unreliability of the Narrative- From very early in the novel, Anna's grandiose voice leads the reader to question the way she presents her reality. Later, as she recounts her interactions with minor characters by whom she has been duped, it becomes clear that Anna's interpretation of events is not entirely trustworthy. In addition to feeling this distrust, the reader is further alienated and begins to outright dislike Anna when she harshly criticizes Alyona's diary, and even goes so far as to write in Alyona's voice. However, because Anna is not fully emotionally present, especially with regards to her relationship with her daughter, the reader is forced to supply the emotions that Anna cannot bring to her narrative, therefore making the experience of reading the novel all the more powerful.

Space- Many scenes from the novel take place within Anna and her family's dwelling. The chaotic voice of the narrative is reflected in the chaotic way in which the space (in addition to other symbols of familial community, such as food) is shared.

Time- The novel is not chronological, but rather a series of anecdotes told by Anna. For example, stories of Alyona as a child, teenager, and mother are intermixed and often told without time markers. This makes it difficult for the reader to follow the action of the story or the plot, and adds to the growing sense of disorder as the novel progresses.

== Literary significance ==
Originally published in the dissident journal Novy Mir, The Time: Night entered the scene on the border between mainstream and dissident literature just after the demise of the Soviet Union. Critics have acclaimed it as both Petrushevskaya's strongest work and the standard mold for her distinctive voice. The Time: Night does typify Petrushevskaya's dark sense of humor and candid portrayal of gritty urban life in post-Soviet Moscow; "unforgiving verbal authenticity" is a defining quality of all Petrushevskaya's work. Petrushevskaya's narrative style being "fueled by rumor, gossip, and polemic," her work suffered harsh criticism during Perestroika, when cynicism began to lose its appeal among the literary elite. Similarly, the author's evenhanded portrayal of physiology in The Time: Night starkly contrasted traditional treatment of the issue in the early 1990s. Helen Goscilo frames Petrushevskaya's "presumably unmotivated frankness" concerning the body as a break from a "feminine" mode of expression particular to only a few modern Russian women writers. Petrushevskaya's chef d'oeuvre has since earned a reputation as a pillar of New Women's Prose, a genre of "bracing irreverence" and "complete lack of 'ladylike' squeamishness." Notably, however, Petrushevskaya does not take a particularly militant feminist stance, given the groundbreaking implications of The Time: Night. When prompted by an editor (before the publication of the novella) as to whether she sided with men or women, Petrushevskaya responded with "I'm on the side of the children.". Though her characters complain bitterly of Soviet and post-Soviet women's conditions, Petrushevskaya, nor New Women's Prose as a genre sprung from her work, minimizes "women's collusion in their own victimization." It might be concluded, then, that while Petrushevskaya introduced a blunt portrayal of contemporary Russian women's life in The Time: Night, her frankness is less a political tool than an empathetic gesture, though it took scholars years to identify that purpose.

== Explanation of Title ==
In the beginning of the novel, The Time: Night, sometimes translated simply as Night Time, signifies the time of silence while Anna is surrounded by her sleeping family. By the end of the novel, however, the title comes to symbolize the loneliness and alienation Anna experiences at night after her family, no longer able to stand her forceful presence, leaves her.

== Development history ==
There is some conjecture that the inspiration for the relationships and feelings presented in The Time: Night came from Petrushevskaya's childhood experience living with her family in Kuybyshev. When Petrushevskaya was five, her mother returned to Moscow while she remained in Kuybyshev with other family members to suffer the hardships of poverty and famine.

== Publication history ==
Originally published in Russian in Novy Mir, No. 2, 1992. Copyright 1992 by Ludmilla Petrushevskaya. First published in English in 1994 by Pantheon Books, New York, and Virago Press Limited, London. English translation copyright 1994 by Sally Laird. Reprinted 2000 by arrangement with Pantheon Books, a division of Random House, Inc.

English Editions:

1994, United States of America, Pantheon Books, ISBN 978-0-679-43616-4, Pub Date 23 August 1994

1994, United Kingdom, Virago Press, Limited, ISBN 978-1-85381-701-4, Pub Date 1994

2000, United States of America, Northwestern University Press, ISBN 978-0-8101-1800-3, Pub Date 11 October 2000

== Adaptations ==
No notable efforts have yet been made toward a film adaptation of The Time: Night. However, Petrushevskaya scholar Helena Goscilo has noted a thematic similarity between Petrushevskaya's work and the films of Russian director Kira Muratova.
