= All the Sad Young Literary Men =

Novel by Keith Gessen

- Author: Keith Gessen
- Publisher: Viking Press
- Publication date: April 10, 2008
- ISBN: 978-0-670-01855-0

All the Sad Young Literary Men is the debut novel of Keith Gessen, the founder of the journal n+1. It was published by Viking in April 2008.

== Plot ==
Gessen's novel centers around the stories of three literary-minded friends: Keith, a Harvard-educated writer living in New York City; Sam, living in Boston and writing the "great Zionist epic"; and Mark, who is trying to complete a history dissertation on the Mensheviks at Syracuse University.

== Title ==
The title is derived from F. Scott Fitzgerald's third collection of short stories, All the Sad Young Men. This collection includes two of Fitzgerald's most famous stories about privilege and romance surprised by the chillier realities outside a university's gates, "Winter Dreams" and "The Rich Boy."

== Reception ==
In The New York Review of Books, novelist and critic Joyce Carol Oates called the novel "mordantly funny, and frequently poignant," adding "in this debut novel there is much that is charming and beguiling, and much promise." In The New York Times Book Review, Andrew O'Hagan wrote:

Gessen’s style is good-natured and ripe enough to allow a satisfying sweetness to exist in these characters as they journey around the carnival of their own selfishness. Mark and Sam and Keith may encapsulate a certain generational passion for careers over values, but their adventures here often serve laughingly to set them down among the aging troubles of the world. There must, after all, be a way of life in which literary young men are not enslaved to the sad business of always having to do better than 'the people they went to college with.'

By contrast New York called the novel "self-satisfied" and "boringly solipsistic".
