= Trial of Cecily McMillan =

The trial of Cecily McMillan was held at the New York City Criminal Court.

McMillan was defended by Martin Stolar, an attorney with the National Lawyers Guild. McMillan claimed to have "reacted instinctively when he grabbed her breast", claiming that she didn't know he was a police officer and thought that he was attempting to sexually assault her. She testified that "she had no recollection of hitting the officer". The prosecution charged that she intentionally elbowed the officer while trying to escape him.

A picture of a bruise above McMillan's right breast was taken a day after she was arrested, and was introduced as evidence to support her claims. However, McMillan's medical records failed to support this, with the prosecutor emphasizing "nowhere in records from doctors, a social worker or a psychologist who treated McMillan in the hours after her arrest is there an allegation that a police officer grabbed McMillan's breast". Bovell denied groping her breast. Assistant district attorney Erin Choi accused McMillan of lying about being groped for the sake of publicity, claiming to the jury "she wanted to pull the wool over your eyes". Choi claimed that producing the mark would have required "razor blades as fingernails and a hot iron for a hand", noting that the bruise was first recorded in McMillan's medical records three days after the incident and implying McMillan had inflicted the injuries herself after posting bail.

Officer Bovell testified he encountered Ms. McMillan flailing her arms and shouting curses at a female officer, who was never located and did not testify. Officer Bovell said he told Ms. McMillan to leave the park, and when she refused, put her hand on her shoulder to steer her out. Bovell testified "I remember her saying to someone: 'Are you filming this? Are you filming this?'" before "crouching down and lunging with her elbow and hitting me in the face". A video supported his account, showing McMillan "bending her knees, then throwing her right elbow into the officer's eye". The video also shows her as she "lurches forward, runs a few steps, then is tackled by several officers".

McMillan claimed to have suffered a seizure after "being wrestled to the ground during her arrest". Prosecutors claimed that McMillan faked a seizure in order to resist arrest, noting that four separate doctors failed to diagnose McMillan with any form of seizure following her arrest. Assisting defense attorney Erin Choi noted that McMillan's chief complaint in the hospital was "difficulty breathing", rating her pain on a 1-10 scale "a 1 or a 2", but telling another doctor two days later that it was a "10". An attending physician claimed that McMillan had told him she was "doing well at this time, apart from current legal status". An officer testified that McMillan was "writhing back and forth and complaining she couldn't breathe", so she "gave McMillan a coat and pulled down her lime-green miniskirt to prevent her from exposing herself, and held her head to prevent her from hitting it on the pavement while she writhed on the ground".

Following the month-long trial, the twelve-person jury reached their verdict after deliberating for three hours on May 5, 2014, finding McMillan guilty of assaulting a police officer. The court convicted her of second-degree assault, a felony that could result in a prison term of up to seven years. Justice Ronald A. Zweibel order her detained without bail until her sentencing on May 19. Jon Swaine of The Guardian reported that nine of the twelve jurors who found McMillan guilty wrote to the trial judge expressing their opinion that she not be given a prison sentence. "We would ask the court to consider probation with community service. We also ask that you factor in your deliberation process that this request is coming from 9 of the 12 member jury," the letter read. The letter, which was signed by one juror, was copied to all other members of the panel and to McMillan's attorney, Martin Stolar.

Lucy Steigerwald of Vice magazine argued that the conviction was "stunning and ridiculous", citing The Guardian's Molly Knefel, who said that photographs of McMillan's bruises were ignored during her trial and complained that prosecutors were allowed to cast doubt on McMillan's claims. At one point during the proceedings, according to Knefel, the arresting officer "repeatedly identified the wrong eye when testifying as to how McMillan injured him" and the judge refused to allow evidence about his past. Supporters felt that McMillan was singled out as a target. The officer who arrested McMillan had been accused of excessive force in three previous cases. However, Bovell had already been cleared of any wrongdoing by the department, with the only legitimate charge being failing to announce pursuit over departmental radio. Although Bovell's involvement in the 2011 Bronx ticketing scandal was included in the trial, Bovell claimed that he "hadn't realized his actions were illegal", and the New York Police Department stated that "an allegation of ticket fixing is immaterial as to either Officer Bovell's alleged propensity to physically abuse or sexually assault a prisoner held in police department custody". Bovell suffered a black eye in the assault, along with bruising, swelling, and a cut under his eye. He later experienced headaches and blurred vision. The New York Daily News and The Guardian reported that Bovell "repeatedly cited the wrong eye when testifying".

McMillan was later sentenced to three months in prison and five years of probation, and was ordered to undergo a mental health evaluation and treatment. Prior to sentencing, assistant district attorney Shanda Strain said "The defendant not only physically assaulted the police officer but also leveled false accusations of misconduct against him in an effort to avoid her own criminal responsibility for the assault", noting that McMillan had "lied under oath in order to avoid responsibility for her actions". Strain also claimed that "through her lies, she has undermined the claims of genuine sexual assault victims who seek justice in this system".
