= Keith Gessen =

American writer

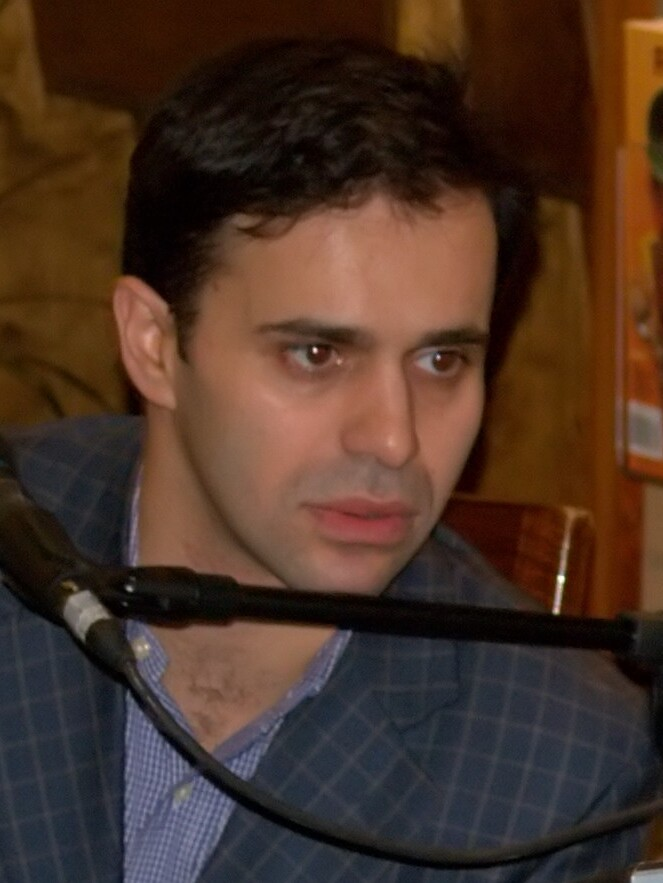
- Born: Konstantin Alexandrovich Gessen; January 9, 1975 (age 51); Moscow, Russian SFSR, Soviet Union
- Education: Harvard University (BA); Syracuse University (MFA)
- Occupations: Editor; writer; academic; translator
- Relatives: M. Gessen (sibling)

Keith Gessen (born January 9, 1975) is a Russian-born American novelist, journalist, and translator. He is a founding editor of American literary magazine n+1 and an associate professor of journalism at the Columbia University Graduate School of Journalism. In 2008 he was named a "5 under 35" honoree by the National Book Foundation.

== Early life and education ==
Born Konstantin Alexandrovich Gessen (Russian: Константи́н Алекса́ндрович Ге́ссен), he was raised in a Jewish family in Moscow, Russian SFSR, Soviet Union. Gessen's mother was a literary critic, and his father is a computer scientist specializing in forensics. His maternal grandmother, Rosalia "Ruzya" Solodovnik, was a Soviet government censor of dispatches filed by foreign reporters; his paternal grandmother, Ester Goldberg, was a translator for a foreign literary magazine. In 1981, his family moved to the United States, settling in the Boston area. They lived in Brookline and Newton, Massachusetts.

Gessen graduated from Harvard University with a B.A. in history and literature in 1998. He completed the coursework for his M.F.A. in creative writing from Syracuse University in 2004 but did not initially receive a degree, having failed to submit "a final original work of fiction." He did ultimately receive the degree.

== Career ==
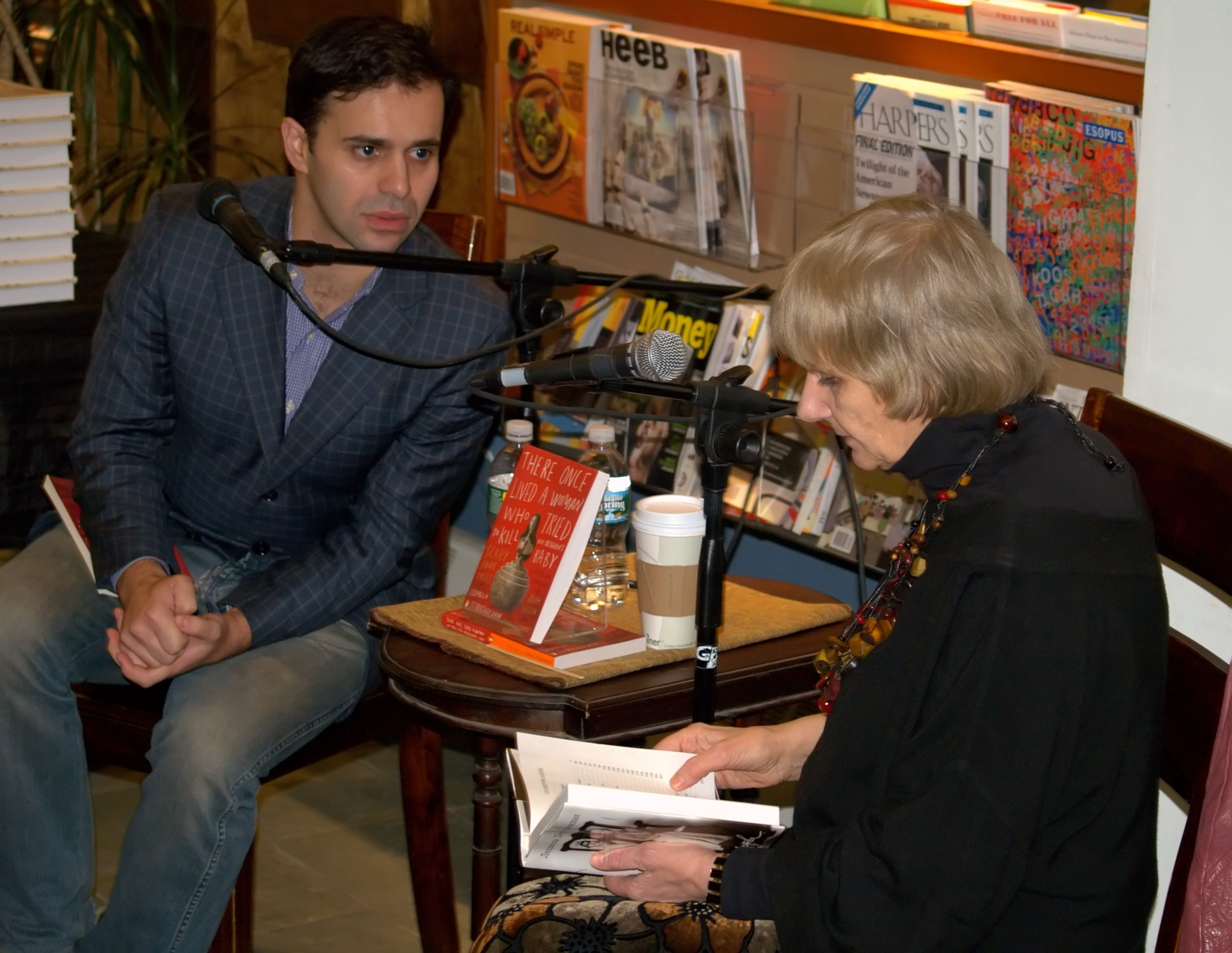
Gessen with Russian novelist Lyudmila Petrushevskaya in 2009

Gessen has written about Russia for The New Yorker, the London Review of Books, The Atlantic, and The New York Review of Books. In 2004–2005, he was the regular book critic for New York magazine.

In 2005, Dalkey Archive Press published Gessen's translation of Svetlana Alexievich's Voices from Chernobyl (Russian: Tchernobylskaia Molitva), an oral history of the Chernobyl nuclear disaster. In 2009, Penguin published his translation (with Anna Summers) of Lyudmila Petrushevskaya's There Once Lived a Woman Who Tried to Kill Her Neighbor's Baby.

Gessen's first novel, All the Sad Young Literary Men, was published in April 2008 and received mixed reviews. Joyce Carol Oates wrote that "in this debut novel there is much that is charming and beguiling, and much promise." Jonathan Franzen said: "It's so delicious the way he writes." New York Magazine, on the other hand, called the novel "self-satisfied" and "boringly solipsistic."

In 2010, Gessen edited and introduced Diary of a Very Bad Year: Confessions of an Anonymous Hedge Fund Manager, a book about the 2008 financial crisis.

In 2011, he became involved in the Occupy movement in New York City. He co-edited the OCCUPY! Gazette, a newspaper reporting on Occupy Wall Street and sponsored by n+1. On November 17, 2011, Gessen was arrested by the New York City police while covering and participating in an Occupy protest at the New York Stock Exchange. He wrote about this experience for The New Yorker.

In 2015, Gessen co-edited with Stephen Squibb City by City: Dispatches from the American Metropolis, which was named a "Best Summer Read" of 2015 by Publishers Weekly.

In 2018, Gessen's second novel, A Terrible Country, was published. In March 2019, it was serialized on BBC Radio 4.

Gessen wrote a non-fiction memoir about raising his son, titled Raising Raffi: The First Five Years, which was published in 2022.

== Personal life ==
Gessen is married to the writer Emily Gould and was previously married when he arrived in New York City at age 22. As of 2008, he resided in Clinton Hill, Brooklyn. He has three siblings, including M. Gessen.

== Bibliography ==
=== Novels ===
- Gessen, Keith (2008). All the sad young literary men. Penguin Books.
- — (2018). A terrible country: a novel. New York: Viking.

=== Non-fiction ===
==== Books ====
- Gessen, Keith, ed. (2010). Diary of a very bad year: confessions of an anonymous hedge fund manager.
- Gessen, Keith & Stephen Squibb, eds. (2015). City by city: dispatches from the American metropolis. New York: n + 1/Farrar, Straus and Giroux.
- Gessen, Keith (2022). Raising Raffi: the first five years. New York: Viking.

==== Articles ====
- Gessen, Keith (November 27, 2011). "Central Booking". News Desk. The New Yorker.
- — (May 12, 2014). "Waiting for war : can the country hold together?". Letter from Ukraine. The New Yorker. 90 (12): 44–53.
- Gessen, Keith (November 6, 2017). "State of terror : a historian explains how Stalin turned Stalinist". The New Yorker. 93 (35): 62–70. (Note: Online version is titled "How Stalin became Stalinist".)
- — (April 25 – May 2, 2022). "Demilitarized : the novelist Andrey Kurkov writes of a Ukrainian beekeeper at war with war". The Critics. Books. The New Yorker. 98 (10): 71–73. (Note: Online version is titled "A Ukrainian novel looks between the lines of war".)
- — (September 5, 2022). "Don't be like that : liberal parents, radical children, and the making of a literary masterpiece". The Critics. A Critic at Large. The New Yorker. 98 (27): 55–60. (Note: Online version is titled "Liberals, radicals, and the making of a literary masterpiece".)

=== Translations ===
- Alexievich, Svetlana (2005). Voices from Chernobyl. Translated by Keith Gessen. Dalkey Archive Press.
- Petrushevskaya, Ludmilla (2009). There once lived a woman who tried to kill her neighbor's baby: scary fairy tales. Selected and translated by Keith Gessen and Anne Summers. New York: Penguin Books.
- Medvedev, Kiril (2012). It's no good. Translated by Keith Gessen, Mark Krotov, Corey Mead, and Bela Shayevich. Ugly Duckling Press.
