= Marco Roth =

American writer and editor

- Born: 1974 (age 51–52)
- Education: Columbia University; Yale University
- Occupation: Editor
- Known for: Founding n+1 magazine

Marco Roth (born 1974) is an American literary editor and a co-founder and former editor of n+1 magazine.

== Life ==
Roth was born in New York City. He is a graduate of The Dalton School, Columbia University, and began but did not finish a PhD in Comparative Literature from Yale University. In 2009, he was awarded a Pew Fellowship in the Arts, and the Roger Shattuck prize for literary criticism in 2011. He lived for many years in Philadelphia.

He resigned from his masthead position at n+1 in response to the publication of what he called "an unapologetic, celebratory account of the pro-Palestinian rallies on Oct. 8" following the 2023 Hamas-led attack on Israel.

Roth was married to Emily Wilson.

== Essays and criticism ==
His work has appeared in the Dissent, The New York Times, Harper's, Tablet, The London Review of Books, Times Literary Supplement and the Nation. His memoir, The Scientists: A Family Romance, about his father's death and "truths and limitations in literature", came out in 2012.

== Selected works ==
- Roth, Marco (20 February 2014). "I don't want your revolution". London Review of Books. Vol. 36, no. 4. pp. 24–25. Archived from the original on 16 February 2017.
- "Among The Believers" Harper's Magazine. October, 2015.
- "Belgrade: History-of-the-Present" Places Journal, October 2015.
- "An insular view of the Nobel prize". The Guardian. 8 October 2008.
- "A Year in Reading: Marco Roth". The Millions. December 11, 2009.
- "Enduring Love". Tablet. July 19, 2007.
- Roth, Marco; n+1 (2014). "Too Much Sociology". In Wilson, Carl (ed.). Let's Talk About Love: Why Other People Have Such Bad Taste. New York: Bloomsbury Academic. pp. 245–256. ISBN 978-1-4411-6677-7.

Selected Articles published in n+1

- "Derrida: An Autothanatography" A memoir/obituary about Roth/Derrida.
- "I'm with Stupid" - About Michael Moore and our values."
- "On Torture And Parenting" On the psychology of American torturers and behavioral therapists.
- "Attack of the Clones" On Houellebecq, Ishiguro, and the idea of the clone in contemporary fiction.
- "Lower the Voting Age!" Argument to lower the voting age to 16.
- "Rise of the Neuronovel" Neurology vs. Modernism in Contemporary Fiction.
- "Throwback Throwdown" On the rhetoric of "sampling" in contemporary writing.
- "The Information Essay" On the informational sublime in the contemporary essay.
- "The Drone Philosopher" On Drones and the imagination.

Interviews

- "Young Critics: Marco Roth". Full Stop. 22 June 2011.
- "Conversations With Writers Braver Than Me #14." The Rumpus. January 4, 2013.
