= Lyudmila Petrushevskaya =

Russian writer, novelist and playwright (born 1938)

- Людмила Петрушевская
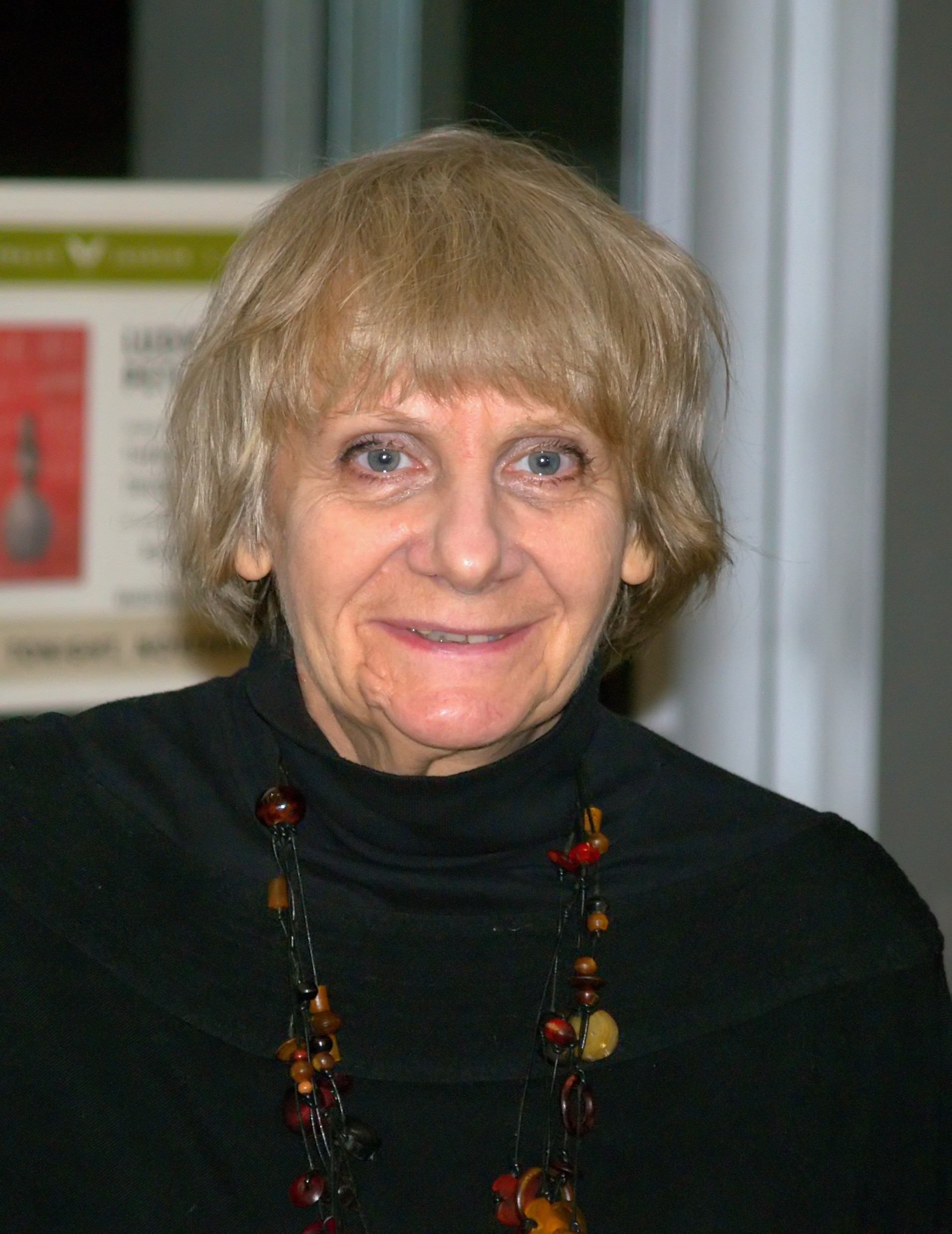
- In New York City, November 2009.
- Born: 26 May 1938 (age 88); Moscow, Russian SFSR, Soviet Union
- Citizenship: Russia
- Education: Moscow State University
- Writing career
- Genres: Fiction, drama, film, songwriting, singing, visual arts

Lyudmila Stefanovna Petrushevskaya (Russian: Людмила Стефановна Петрушевская; born 26 May 1938) is a Russian writer, novelist and playwright. She began her career writing short stories and plays, which the Soviet government often censored and published several well-respected prose works following perestroika.

She is best known for her plays, novels, The Time: Night, and collections of short stories, notably There Once Lived a Woman Who Tried to Kill Her Neighbor's Baby. In 2017, she published a memoir, The Girl from the Metropol Hotel. She is considered one of Russia's premier living literary figures, having been compared in style to Anton Chekhov and in influence to Aleksandr Solzhenitsyn. Her works have won several accolades, including the Russian Booker Prize, the Pushkin Prize, and the World Fantasy Award.

Her creative interests and successes are wide-ranging, as she is also a singer and has worked in film animation, screenwriting, and painting.

== Early life ==
Petrushevskaya was born in Moscow, USSR, on 26 May 1938, in the stately Metropol Hotel. She lived there with her family until 1941, when her father, a Bolshevik intellectual, was declared an enemy of the state. He abandoned Petrushevskaya and her mother, who were forced to flee the city for Kuibyshev (now Samara). Following this, Petrushevskaya recounts a harrowing early childhood spent in group homes, on the streets, and later in communal apartments. She states in The Girl from the Metropol Hotel that she earned the nickname "The Moscow Matchstick" from other children during this time, due to her thinness.

At age nine, Petrushevskaya and her mother returned to Moscow, where she spent most of her childhood and adolescence. She attended Moscow State University, where she graduated with a degree in journalism.

== Career ==
Petrushevskaya is regarded as one of Russia's most prominent contemporary writers, and one of the most acclaimed writers at work in Eastern Europe; Publishers Weekly has stated that she is "generally considered to be one of the finest living Russian writers." In recent decades, her work has become increasingly well-known in the West. Her writing combines postmodernist trends with the psychological insights and parodic touches of writers such as Anton Chekhov.

She spent most of her early career until perestroika writing and putting on plays rather than novels and stories, as the theater censorship was often less strict than written work. She recounts, nevertheless, being frequently monitored by the KGB and facing resistance from Soviet censors to having her work performed. In an interview with the Financial Times, she recalls presenting an early work of prose to the prominent literary journal Novy Mir, and having it deemed too risky to publish: “They said they couldn’t protect me. Those were very bloody times... If they had published me, I would have had a terrible fame. It would have been dangerous. I would have ended up in prison." Nevertheless, she produced several respected plays, one of the most prominent of which is Andante. Additionally, in 1979, she was a co-writer for the influential Russian animated film, Tale of Tales; her influence in Russian film continued when she served as a jury member in the 3rd Open Russian Festival of Animated Film in 1998.

Following Gorbachev-era governmental reforms, she began to publish novels and short stories that she had previously kept to herself. With her first collection of stories, Immortal Love, she "became a household name virtually overnight," and was published in Novy Mir as she had been unable to do so only a couple of decades earlier. Other later works include the novels The Time: Night (1992) and The Number One, both short-listed for the Russian Booker Prize. Since the late 1980s, her plays, stories and novels have been published in more than 30 languages, and she has earned several accolades. In 2003, she was awarded the Pushkin Prize in Russian literature by the Alfred Toepfer Foundation in Germany. She was additionally awarded the Russian State Prize for arts in 2004, the Stanislavsky Award in 2005, and the Triumph Prize in 2006.

There Once Lived a Woman who Tried to Kill Her Neighbor's Baby, a short story collection, was published in the U.S. by Penguin Books in October 2009 and became a New York Times Book Review bestseller in December. In 2010, it won the World Fantasy Award for Best Collection. The first major translation of her work by an American publisher, the stories often contain mystical or allegorical elements illuminating bleak Soviet and post-Soviet living conditions. The collection of stories has been well reviewed, buttressing Petrushevskaya's reputation in the English-speaking world. An article in Dissent called the collection "a striking introduction to the author's work."

"Petrushevskaya's stories could easily be read as bleak grotesques, populated by envious neighbors, selfish adolescents, and parents who overcompensate with exaggerated love. But ultimately, Petrushevskaya's skillful juxtapositions yield glints of light. Resilience and ingenuity thread through the hardship, whether through forgiveness or love. Such traces of humanity are starker—and brighter—because of the darkness surrounding them."

This collection was followed in 2013 by a second English language book, There Once Lived a Girl Who Seduced Her Sister's Husband, and He Hanged Himself, and the 2017 memoir The Girl from the Metropol Hotel.

Petrushevskaya tends to shy away from praise of her literary achievements--in a 1993 interview with Sally Laird, she said, "Russia is a land of women Homers, women who tell their stories orally, just like that, without inventing anything. They're extraordinarily talented storytellers. I'm just a listener among them." According to Viv Gruskop, she has also responded to her fame by stating, "It has nothing to do with me."

In her late 60s, Petrushevskaya started a singing career, creating new lyrics for her favorite songs. Since 2008, she has been regularly performing as a cabaret singer in Moscow (from nightclubs to major venues such as the Moscow House of Music) and across Russia, as well as internationally. She is known to sing French and German jazz songs, and recently has begun writing her own.

Petrushevskaya is also known as a visual artist; her portraits, nudes, and still life have been shown in Russia's major museums, including the Tretyakov Gallery, Pushkin Museum of Fine Arts, and State Museum of Literature, and private galleries.

In 2023, Petrushevskaya announced that as a result of the Russian invasion of Ukraine she was not longer able to write, posting to social media that "This aggressive war, the sudden and inexplicable hatred by the majority of our (Russophone) nation for our neighbors and family, the Ukrainian people, have put an end to my profession."

== Works ==
- Immortal Love (1987)
- The Time: Night (1992)
- The Number One (2004)
- There Once Lived a Woman Who Tried to Kill Her Neighbor's Baby (2009)
- There Once Lived a Girl Who Seduced Her Sister's Husband, and He Hanged Himself: Love Stories (2013)
- There Once Lived a Mother Who Loved her Children Until They Moved Back In (2014)
- The Girl from the Metropol Hotel (2017)
- The New Adventures of Helen : Magical Tales (2021)
- Kidnapped: A Story of Crimes (2023)
