= Cecily McMillan =

American activist

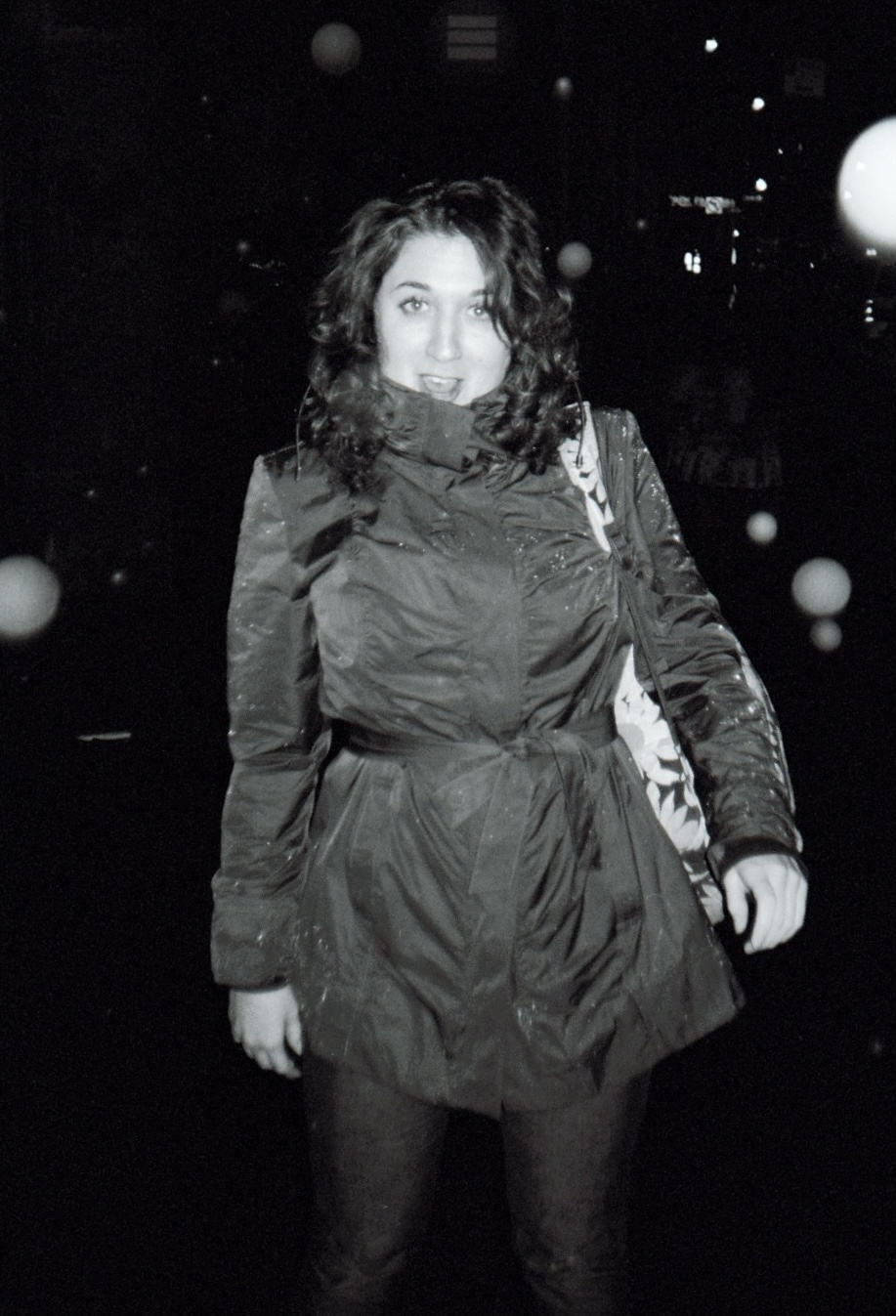
Cecily McMillan in 2014

Cecily McMillan (born 1988) is an American activist and advocate for prisoner rights in the United States who was arrested and subsequently convicted of felony second-degree assault. McMillan claimed she was defending herself against an attempted sexual assault by a New York City Police officer as he led her out of the Occupy Wall Street protest in Zuccotti Park on March 17, 2012. McMillan's highly publicized arrest and trial led to her being called a "cause célèbre of the Occupy Wall Street movement". McMillan said that her breast was grabbed and twisted by someone behind her, to which she says she responded to by reflexively elbowing her perceived attacker in the face. The officer involved, Grantley Bovell, testified that she deliberately assaulted him; a video showed McMillan "bending her knees, then throwing her right elbow into the officer's eye". She was arrested after a brief attempt to flee, and says she was beaten by police during her arrest. McMillan was convicted of felony second-degree assault on May 5, 2014, and was subsequently sentenced to three months in prison and five years of probation.

Her trial and conviction were criticized as a "miscarriage of justice" by supporters, who accused the court of failing to allow the defense to introduce what they viewed as important evidence. This evidence was primarily additional media and the officer's records, which contained accounts of several past incidents. McMillan was released from prison early on July 2, 2014, after serving 58 days of her jail sentence at Rikers Island. After her release, McMillan advocated for the plight of inmates and attempted to bring increased attention to the relationship between poverty and incarceration.

== Early life and education ==
McMillan is of Irish and Mexican descent. She was raised by her single mother in Beaumont, Texas, and spent summers in Atlanta, Georgia with her father and his family. She graduated from Lawrence University and actively participated in the 2011 Wisconsin protests where she fought to save collective bargaining from its dismantling by Governor Scott Walker. In New York, she enrolled in graduate school at the New School for Social Research in the fall of 2011 and worked as a nanny for several families. At the New School, she studied nonviolent movements and found inspiration in the works of Bayard Rustin. McMillan was known as a "dedicated pacifist" who had many discussions with her thesis adviser about the topic of nonviolence. She planned to write her master's thesis on Jane Addams and the settlement movement, but Occupy Wall Street (OWS) protests interrupted her studies.

== Occupy Wall Street ==
McMillan continued her studies at the New School, held a part-time job, and became active with the OWS Demands Working Group. During one protest, she occupied a school building along with other demonstrators, but objected to the destruction of property. Her nonviolent approach caused a riff with other protesters who had advocated trashing the building, leading the radical elements in support of the property destruction to hold a "shadow trial" where she was condemned as a "bureaucratic provocateur". "I realized there was a serious problem between anarchists and socialists and democratic socialists. I wanted, like Bayard Rustin, to bring everyone together. I wanted to repair the fractured left. I wanted to build coalitions," McMillan recalls. Nick Pinto of The Wall Street Journal noted that McMillan's political views were "relatively moderate" and that the Occupy Wall Street movement "alienated [her] for insisting the group disavow violence." While McMillan did not initially view Occupy Wall Street in a positive light, she later "got very involved, inspired" by it, calling it "a beautiful experiment". She was heavily involved in the Occupy Wall Street movement for months before the incident, and was spending up to 14 hours a day in Zuccotti Park.

== Zuccotti Park arrest ==
On March 17, 2012, McMillan was celebrating St. Patrick's Day in Lower Manhattan when she went to Zuccotti Park to meet up with more friends. On that day, hundreds of people were in the park commemorating the six-month anniversary of the Occupy Wall Street movement. Police officers announced that the park was closed and that anyone remaining there would be charged with trespassing. Later, police began clearing out the remaining protestors.

According to the police, McMillan was asked to leave the park, but refused to leave. A police officer placed a hand on her shoulder to lead her out. Accounts diverge here, with McMillan saying the officer grabbed her breast and, in return, she elbowed the police officer in the eye. The officer testified that she suddenly asked, "Are you filming this? Are you filming this?", after which she struck him in the face with her elbow. Video supported the officer's account, showing McMillan "bending her knees, then throwing her right elbow into the officer's eye". After briefly attempting to flee, she was tackled by several police officers and detained. The New York Times reported that McMillan appeared to have "what looked like a seizure" while being loaded onto a police bus, and was then transported to a hospital.

McMillan wrote about the incident:

As I remember it, the officer surprised me from behind, grabbing my right breast so forcefully, he lifted me off the ground. In that moment, my elbow met his face... I remember someone pushing me to the ground, my face hitting a grate. Next thing I knew, I was strapped to a gurney, my skirt up above my hips. I had bruises across my body and a handprint on my chest. Officers were joking about my "Ocupussy". I learned later that I had been beaten on the head, triggering a seizure. Videos posted online showed people shouting "Help her!" amid the seizure while the cops stood by. The first time I saw those videos, I watched in horror — I couldn't believe that I was the person going through that ordeal.

== Trial and conviction ==
The trial became a rallying point among people who sympathized with the Occupy Wall Street protests of 2011 and 2012, which called attention to the gap between rich and poor and criticized the government bailout of big banks. Many of Ms. McMillan's supporters saw in her a potent symbol of the police crackdown that ended the occupation of Zuccotti Park and snuffed out the protest's momentum.

—James C. McKinley Jr. in The New York Times

The trial was held at the New York City Criminal Court. McMillan was defended by Martin Stolar, an attorney with the National Lawyers Guild. McMillan said that a bruise on her breast, shown in photographs at trial, was inflicted by Officer Bovell. Prosecutors argued that Bovell did not cause the injury. They said McMillan did not report the alleged assault at either of two hospitals where she received treatment on the night of the arrest, but that the pictures were taken days later by her personal doctor.

The trial lasted a month. On May 5, 2014, the twelve-person jury reached its verdict after deliberating for three hours. The jury found McMillan guilty of intentionally assaulting a police officer. The court convicted her of second-degree assault, a felony that could have resulted in a prison term of up to seven years. Justice Ronald A. Zweibel ordered her detained without bail until her sentencing on May 19. McMillan was later sentenced to three months in prison and five years of probation; she was ordered to undergo a mental health evaluation and treatment.

== Imprisonment at Rikers Island ==
McMillan served her sentence at Rikers Island Penitentiary. On May 9, members of the Russian punk rock group Pussy Riot visited McMillan on Rikers Island as part of a campaign by The Voice Project petitioning for leniency. A friend of McMillan said that McMillan was made to wait close to three weeks before receiving her prescribed ADHD medication, and that she was intermittently denied it afterwards. McMillan said that after asking how she could obtain her medication, a corrections officer who had previously addressed her as "Vagina" answered, "Oh, you want your crazy pills?". In one case, she said she was assaulted by the prison pharmacist for looking at his badge after he allegedly harassed her. She filed a complaint but did not take further action due to worries about retaliation. McMillan was released on July 2, 2014 after serving 58 days at Rikers.

== Prisoner rights advocacy ==
After her release, McMillan advocated for the rights of prisoners at Rikers. In an opinion piece for The New York Times, McMillan said that inmates were denied medical treatment, humiliated, and subject to random searches. At a press conference, she called for "better access to healthcare, drug rehabilitation services and education inside the jail." McMillan told Democracy Now! that "deplorable conditions existed in the prison," and expressed concern over the death of her friend Judith, who died shortly before McMillan's release. She viewed Judith's death as a potential case of medical malpractice, saying that Judith's pain medication had been switched to a dangerously high dose, and that requests to get Judith medical treatment after her condition declined were ignored.

== Second criminal case ==
In December 2013, McMillan was arrested and charged with obstructing governmental administration after she tried to intervene when a police officer asked two people in a Union Square subway station for identification. According to the criminal complaint, she was accused of misrepresenting herself as a lawyer and urging the two people not to cooperate with police. After she was acquitted of the charges in November 2014, her lawyer said, "Being annoying and obnoxious to the police is not illegal."

== Memoir ==
In 2016, McMillan's The Emancipation of Cecily McMillan, a memoir, was published by Bold Type Books.
