= Benjamin Kunkel =

American writer

- Born: December 14, 1972 (age 53); Glenwood Springs, Colorado, U.S.
- Education: Deep Springs College; Harvard University (BA); Columbia University (MFA)
- Occupations: Novelist; editor; political economist

Benjamin Kunkel (born December 14, 1972) is an American novelist and political economist.

He co-founded and is a co-editor of the journal n+1.

His novel Indecision was published in 2005; and Utopia or Bust: A Guide to the Present Crisis, and Buzz: A Play & My Predicament: A Story, were published in 2014.

== Background and education ==
Benjamin Kunkel was born in Glenwood Springs, Colorado, and grew up raised by hippie parents in Eagle, Colorado, formerly a cow town and now a town for commuters to Vail, Colorado. He was educated at St. Paul's School in Concord, New Hampshire.

He studied at Deep Springs College in California, graduated with an A.B. from Harvard University, and received his M.F.A. in Creative Writing at Columbia University.

== Career ==
In addition to regularly writing for The New York Times, Kunkel has written for the magazines Granta, Dissent, The Nation, The New York Review of Books, The London Review of Books, The Believer, and The New Yorker.

Kunkel has written multiple short stories and book reviews for the print journal he started with friends from college and graduate school, n+1. In the Fall 2004 issue, he published the short story "Horse Mountain," about an aging man. In the Spring 2005 issue, he published a review of J.M. Coetzee's works, imitating Coetzee's then-recent novel Elizabeth Costello. In the Fall 2005 issue, he published a short story "Or Things I Did Not Do or Say," about a man determined to kill another man.

Much of Kunkel's work exhibits a preoccupation with global social justice and leftist politics, including the Marxist overview Utopia or Bust: A Guide to the Present Crisis, the Kirchner essay Argentinidad, and the anti-capitalist book The Commonist Manifesto. Kunkel is a member of the editorial committee of New Left Review.

== Indecision ==
Indecision was published by Random House in 2005. For the novel, in 2006 he won Le Prix du Premier Roman étranger. Indecision begins with the acknowledgment, "For n+1."

Jay McInerney wrote in the New York Times Book Review that it was "The funniest and smartest coming-of-age novel in years." Kunkel has described the critically acclaimed novel as "overpraised."

== Writings and interviews ==
=== Archives of articles for other magazines ===
- Archive of Kunkel's writings for The Nation (1999–2005).
- Archive of Kunkel's writings for The Believer (2003).

=== Reviews ===
- "The Ideal Husband" – A review of D. H. Lawrence's The Lost Girl. Published in the New York Review of Books (February 24, 2005).
- "The Unreal World" – A review of Don DeLillo's The Body Artist, The Village Voice (February 14–20, 2001).
- "The Sea of Love" – A review of Lighthousekeeping by Jeanette Winterson, in The New York Times (May 1, 2005)
- "The Sameness of Different Things: Reading a new translation of Capital (discussed is Capital: Critique of Political Economy, volume 1, by Karl Marx, edited by Paul North and Paul Reitter, translated by Paul Reitter, Princeton University Press, 2024, 944 pp.), Harper's Magazine, vol. 350, no. 2100 (May 2025), pp. 81–85.

=== Interviews and reading ===
- "Benjamin Kunkel's Tale of Indecision" – Kunkel reads from his novel on NPR, (September 17, 2005).
- "Welcome to the political world" – Interview with Benjamin Kunkel in The Observer, (November 20, 2005).
- "Attack of the listless lads". Salon. September 20, 2005. Archived from the original on July 24, 2008. Half-flippant, half-serious conversation with Kunkel about dating, relationships, and more theoretical gender relations.
