= Permanent Earthquake =

Novel by Evan Dara

- Author: Evan Dara
- Language: English
- Genre: Literary Fiction, Young Adult
- Published: 2021
- Publisher: Aurora
- Publication date: August 1, 2021
- Website: https://aurora148.com/permanentearthquake.php

Permanent Earthquake is the fourth novel from Evan Dara, a pseudonymous American author known for post-modern literary fiction, including The Lost Scrapbook, The Easy Chain, and Flee.

== Overview ==
While the descriptive title of the novel offers an overview of what to expect, most readers have avoided saying much more about the premise so as not to spoil the immersive experience.

The book doesn't offer an overview or quick summary, while the publisher's site only says, "On an island perhaps in the Caribbean, a young man - abandoned, resilient - grapples with nonstop instability. His island is being thrashed by an earthquake that has gone on for months, and shows no signs of shaking anything free..."

The opening of the novel was published in N+1 under the title, This Pitiless Choreography.

== Critical reception ==
In an article published in The Baffler, Marco Roth compared Dara's work to Samuel Beckett and wrote, "[Permanent Earthquake's] unsparing intensity... requires total commitment to a form and voice that was never outmoded or transcended... Only a writer outside the circle of conventional publishing would have the [courage] to attempt this..."

On the YouTube channel, Travel Through Stories, the book was named one of the Top 12 Reads of 2021. "The conceit is highly original, but it's the execution that makes this novel great... A brilliant, brilliant book by one of contemporary America's greatest authors." It is compared to Amy Sackville's The Still Point, since one of the characters in Permanent Earthquake seeks "the stillspot," along with N.K. Jemisen's The Fifth Season, which also sits in the category of apocalyptic literary works.

Steven Moore, considered one of the deans of literary criticism, listed it as one of the best works of 2021.
