= Minimalism =

Movement in various forms of art and design

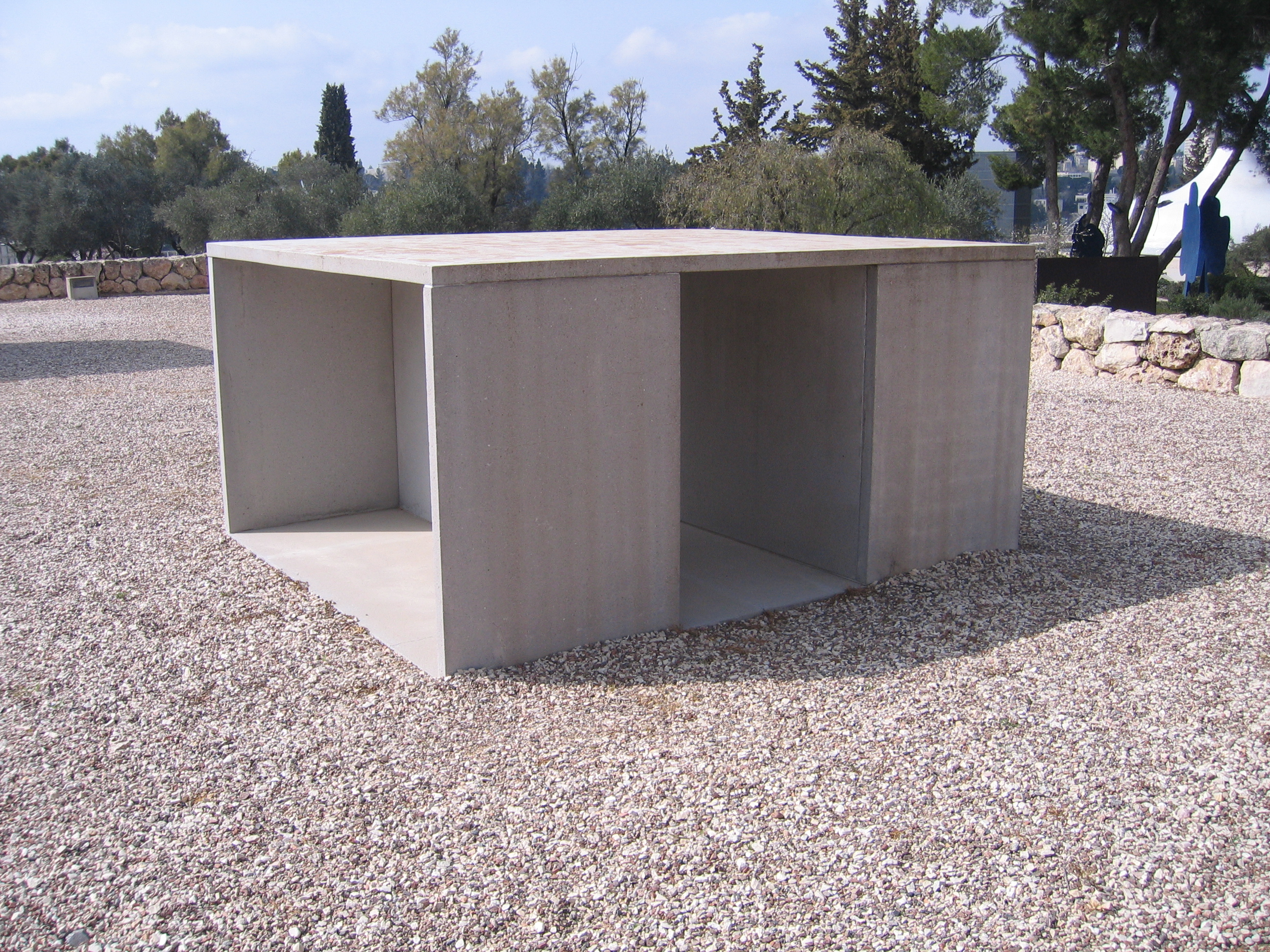
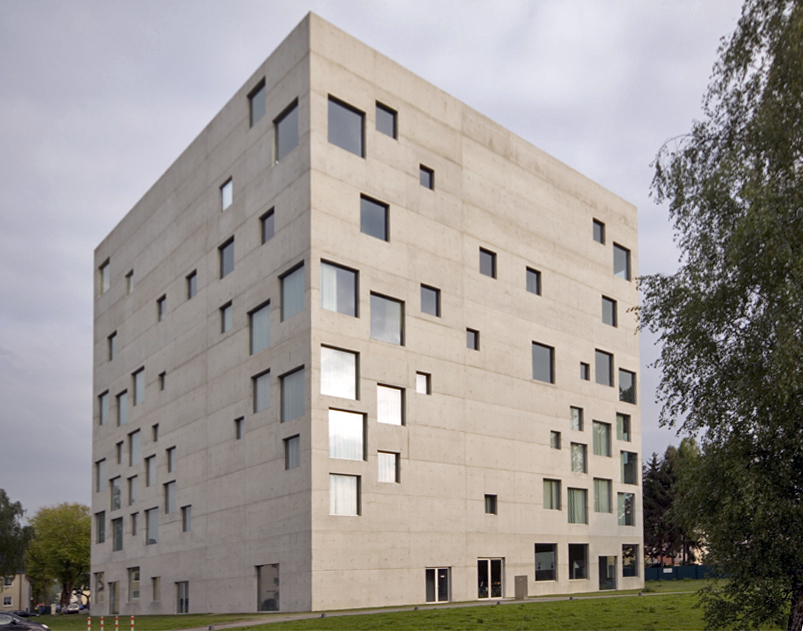
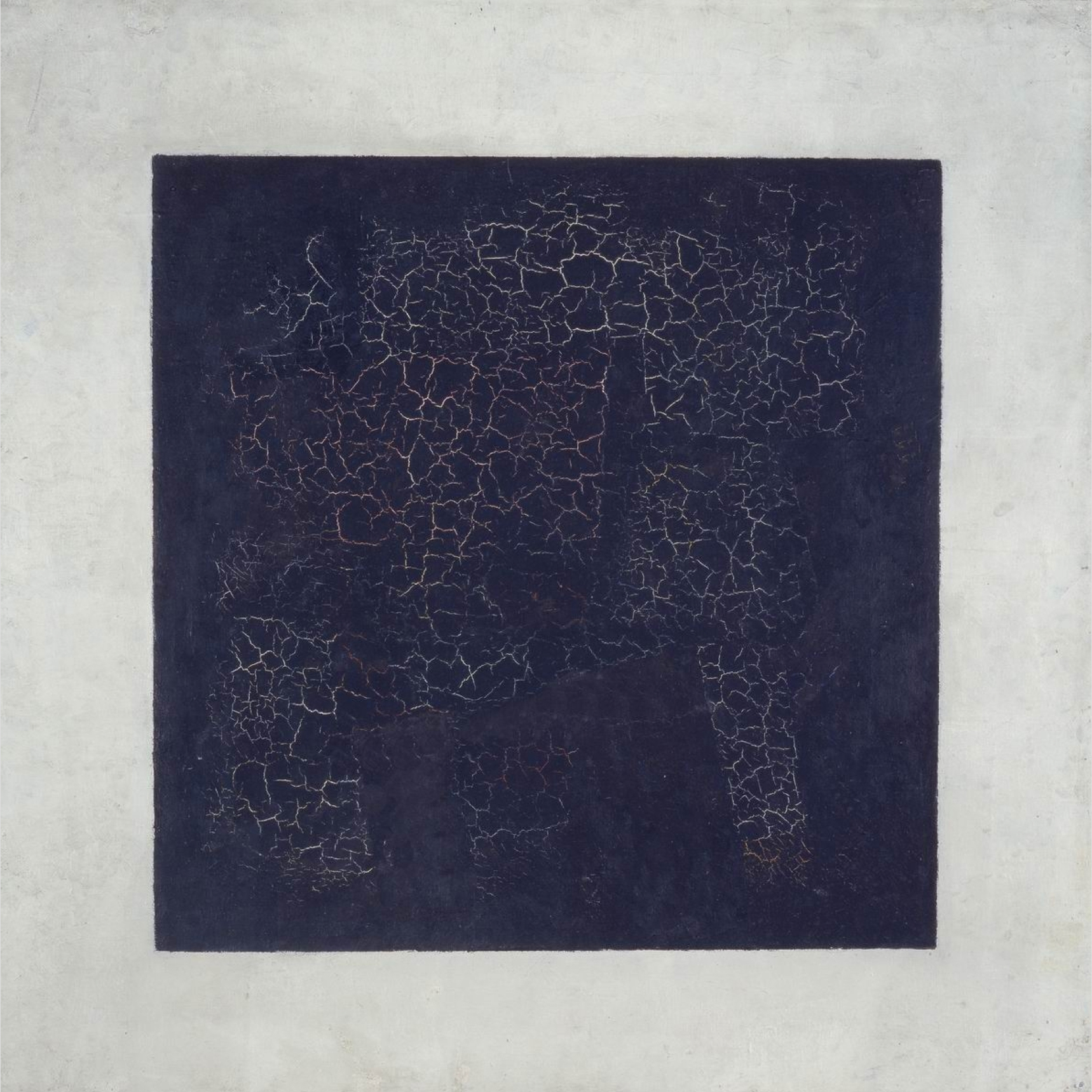
- Top: Untitled, by Donald Judd, concrete sculpture, 1991, Israel Museum; Centre: the Zollverein School of Management and Design SANAA building Essen, Germany, 2005–2006, by SANAA; Bottom: Kazimir Malevich, Black Square, 1915, oil on canvas, 79.5 x 79.5 cm, Tretyakov Gallery, Moscow

Additional media
- Years active: 1960s–present

Minimalism is an art movement that emphasizes reducing art to its essentials, focusing on the object itself and the viewer's experience, with as little mediation from the artist as possible. It emerged in the post-World War II era in Western art, and is often interpreted as a reaction to abstract expressionism and modernism.

Prominent visual artists associated with minimalism include Donald Judd, Agnes Martin, Dan Flavin, Carl Andre, Robert Morris, Anne Truitt, and Frank Stella. Minimal music features methods like repetition and gradual variation, such as the works of La Monte Young, Terry Riley, Steve Reich, Philip Glass, Julius Eastman and John Adams. The term is sometimes used to describe the plays and novels of Samuel Beckett, the films of Robert Bresson, the stories of Raymond Carver, and the automobile designs of Colin Chapman.

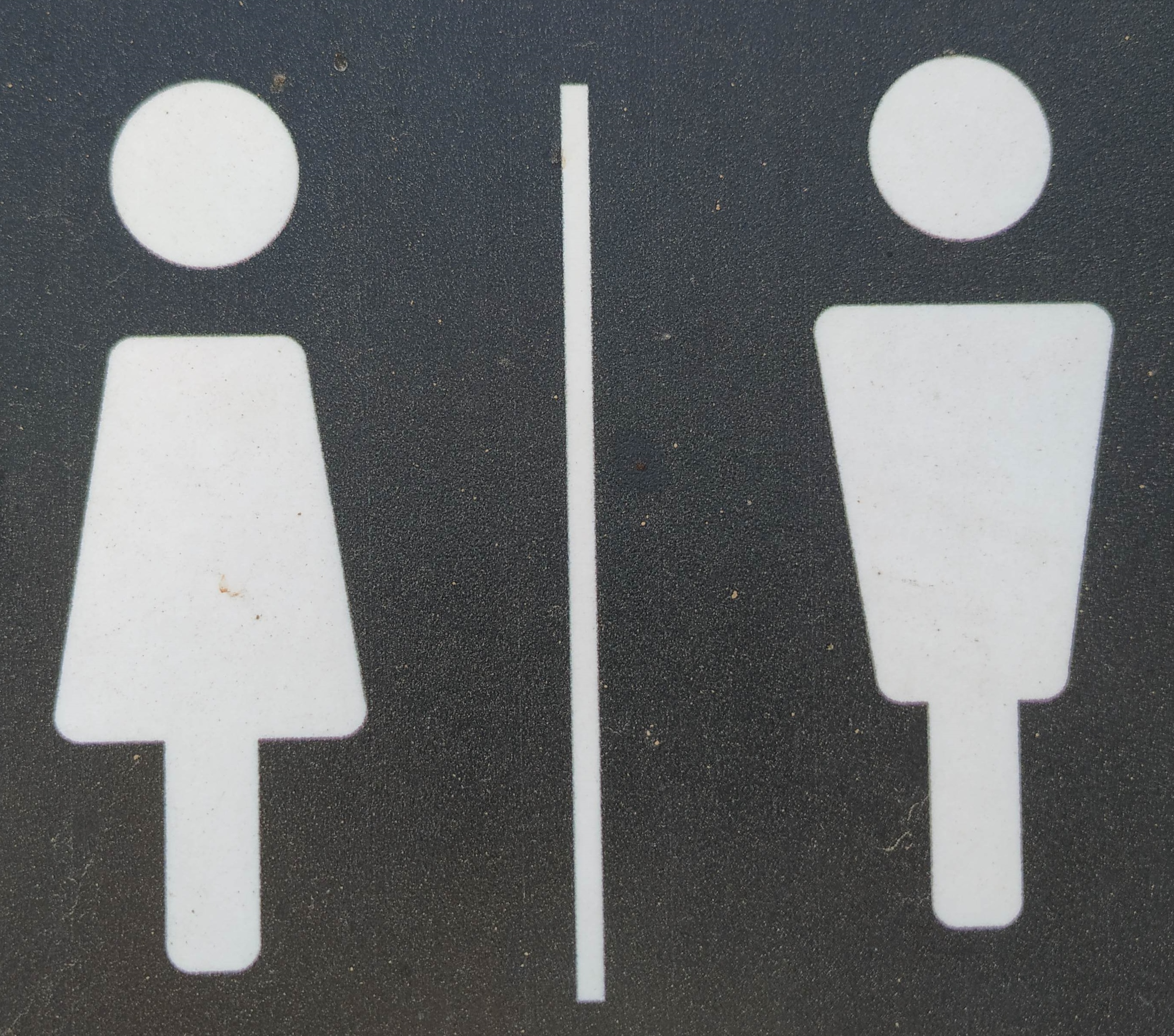
A restroom sign with minimalistic characteristics of two genders. The body is also the same shape, just inverted, which further adds to the minimalism employed in the design of the sign.

The movement preceded postminimalism, which encompasses various practices in contemporary art that extend or critically reflect on minimalism's original aims.

== Visual arts and literalist art ==
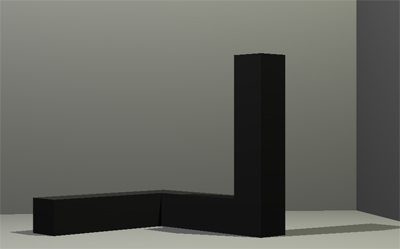
Tony Smith, Free Ride, 1962, 6'8 x 6'8 x 6'8

Minimalism in the visual arts, sometimes called "minimal art", "literalist art", and "ABC Art", refers to a specific movement of artists that emerged in New York in the early 1960s in response to abstract expressionism. Examples of artists working in painting that are associated with Minimalism include Nassos Daphnis, Frank Stella, Kenneth Noland, Al Held, Ellsworth Kelly, Robert Ryman, and others; those working in sculpture include Donald Judd, Dan Flavin, David Smith, Anthony Caro, and others. Minimalism in painting can be characterized by the use of the hard edge, linear lines, simple forms, and an emphasis on two dimensions.

American minimalist artists were heavily influenced by earlier European abstract movements. During that time, New York was hosting exhibitions of the German Bauhaus artists, Russian Constructivists, and Dutch De Stijl artists. Radical abstraction was invented by each of these groups, and they encouraged artists such as Robert Morris, Dan Flavin, and Donald Judd to pursue new artistic trajectories. In order to provide the audience with an instantaneous, purely visual reaction, these artists sought to produce art that had no references to anything other than itself. In order to expose the objective, visual components of art, the subjective, gestural components were removed.

Minimalism was in part a reaction against the painterly subjectivity of Abstract Expressionism that had been dominant in the New York School during the 1940s and 1950s. Dissatisfied with the intuitive and spontaneous qualities of Action Painting, and Abstract Expressionism more broadly, minimalism as an art movement asserted that a work of art should not refer to anything other than itself and should omit any extra-visual association.

Donald Judd's work was showcased in 1964 at Green Gallery in Manhattan, New York City, as were Flavin's first fluorescent light works, while other leading Manhattan galleries like Leo Castelli Gallery and Pace Gallery also began to showcase artists focused on minimalist ideas.

Minimalism in sculpture can be characterized by simple geometric shapes often made of industrial materials like plastic, metal, aluminum, concrete, and fiberglass; these materials are usually left raw or painted a solid color.

In a broader sense, minimalism as a visual strategy can be traced to the geometric abstractions of painters associated with the Bauhaus movement, as well as the works of Kazimir Malevich, Piet Mondrian, and other artists linked to the De Stijl and Russian Constructivist movement. It also appears in the sculptures of Constantin Brâncuși.

As a formal strategy, minimalism has been employed in the paintings of Barnett Newman, Ad Reinhardt, and Josef Albers, as well as in the works of diverse artists including Pablo Picasso, Yayoi Kusama, and Giorgio Morandi. Yves Klein explored the concept through his monochrome paintings, producing them as early as 1949. His first private exhibition of this work was held in 1950, while his first public presentation appeared in the Artist's book Yves: Peintures in November 1954.

=== Literalism ===
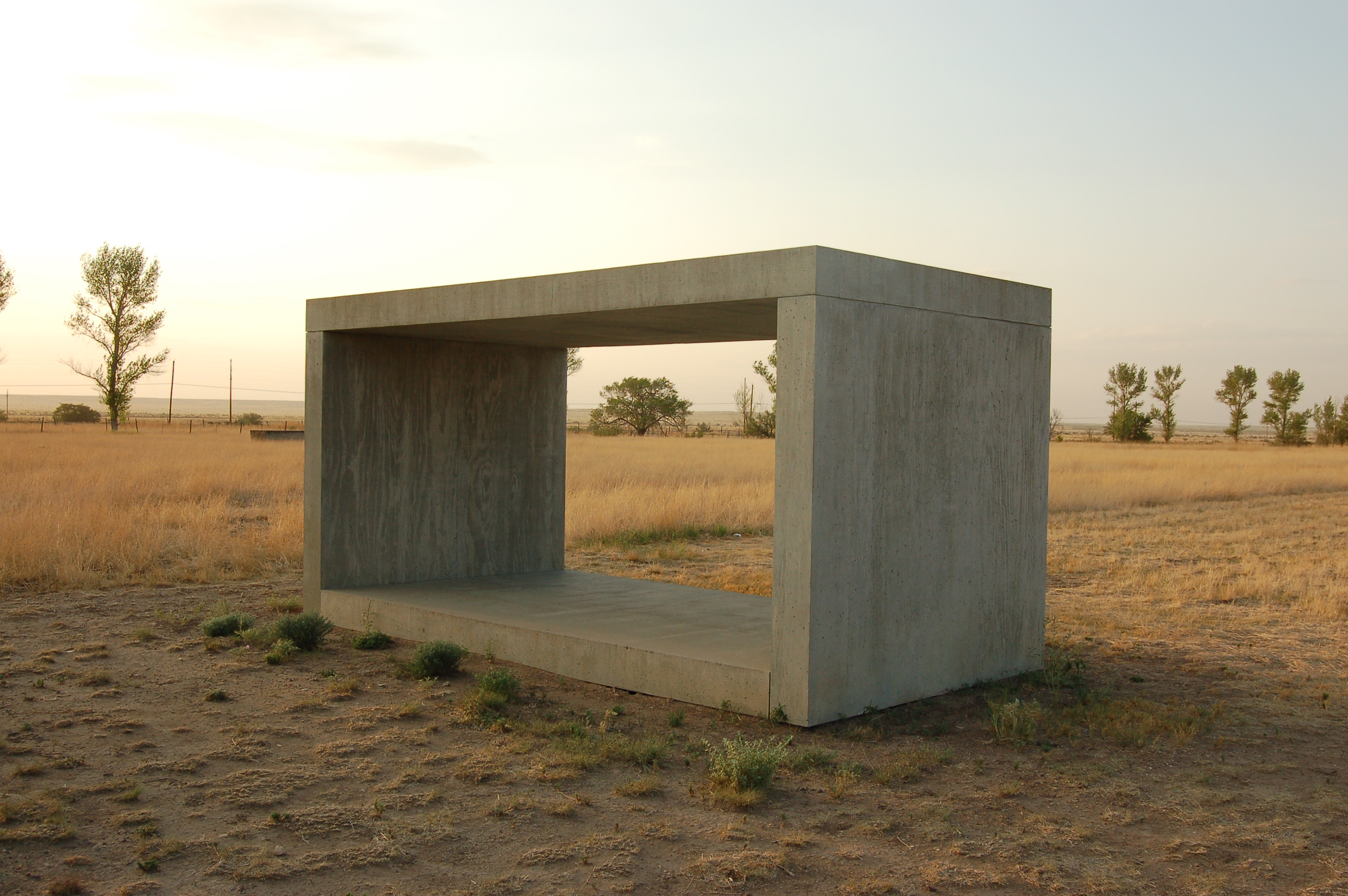
Donald Judd's Untitled

Michael Fried called the minimalist artists "literalists", and used literalism as a pejorative due to his position that the art should deliver transcendental experience with metaphors, symbolism, and stylization. In Fried's controversial view, the literalist art needs a spectator to validate it as art: an "object in a situation" only becomes art in the eyes of an observer. For example, for a regular sculpture, its physical location is irrelevant, and its status as a work of art remains even when unseen. Donald Judd's pieces (see photo), on the other hand, are just objects sitting in the desert sun waiting for a visitor to discover them and accept them as art.

== Design, architecture, and spaces ==
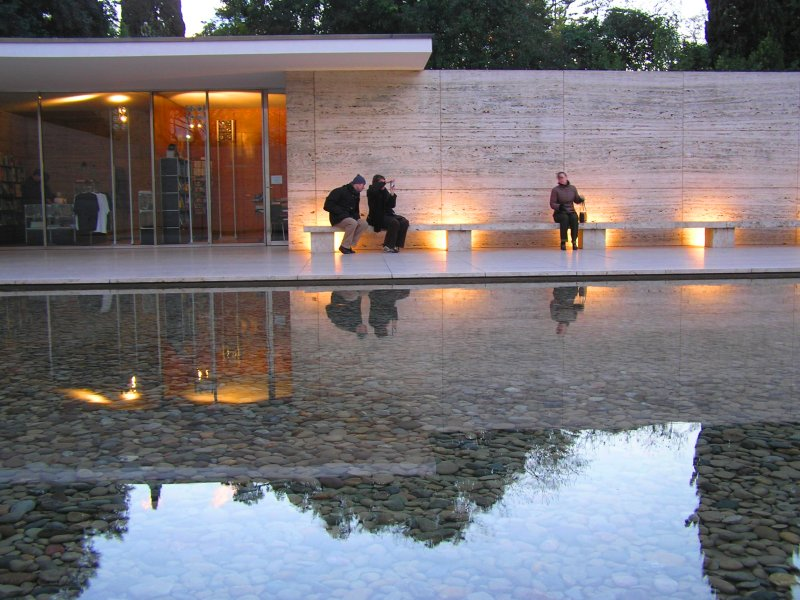
The reconstruction of Ludwig Mies van der Rohe's German Pavilion in Barcelona (2005)

The term "minimalism" is also used to describe a trend in design and architecture, wherein the subject is reduced to its necessary elements. Minimalist architectural designers focus on effectively using vacant space, neutral colors, and eliminating decoration, which is meant to emphasize materiality, tactility, texture, weight, and density. Minimalist architecture became popular in the late 1980s in London, England, and New York City, whereby architects and fashion designers worked together in the boutiques to achieve simplicity, using white elements, cold lighting, and large spaces with minimal furniture and few decorative elements.

The works of De Stijl artists are a major reference: De Stijl expanded the ideas of expression by meticulously organizing basic elements such as lines and planes. In 1924, The Rietveld Schroder House was commissioned by Truus Schröder-Schräder, a precursor to minimalism. The house emphasizes its slabs, beams and posts reflecting De Stijl's philosophy on the relationship between form and function. With regard to home design, more attractive "minimalistic" designs are not truly minimalistic because they are larger, and use more expensive building materials and finishes.

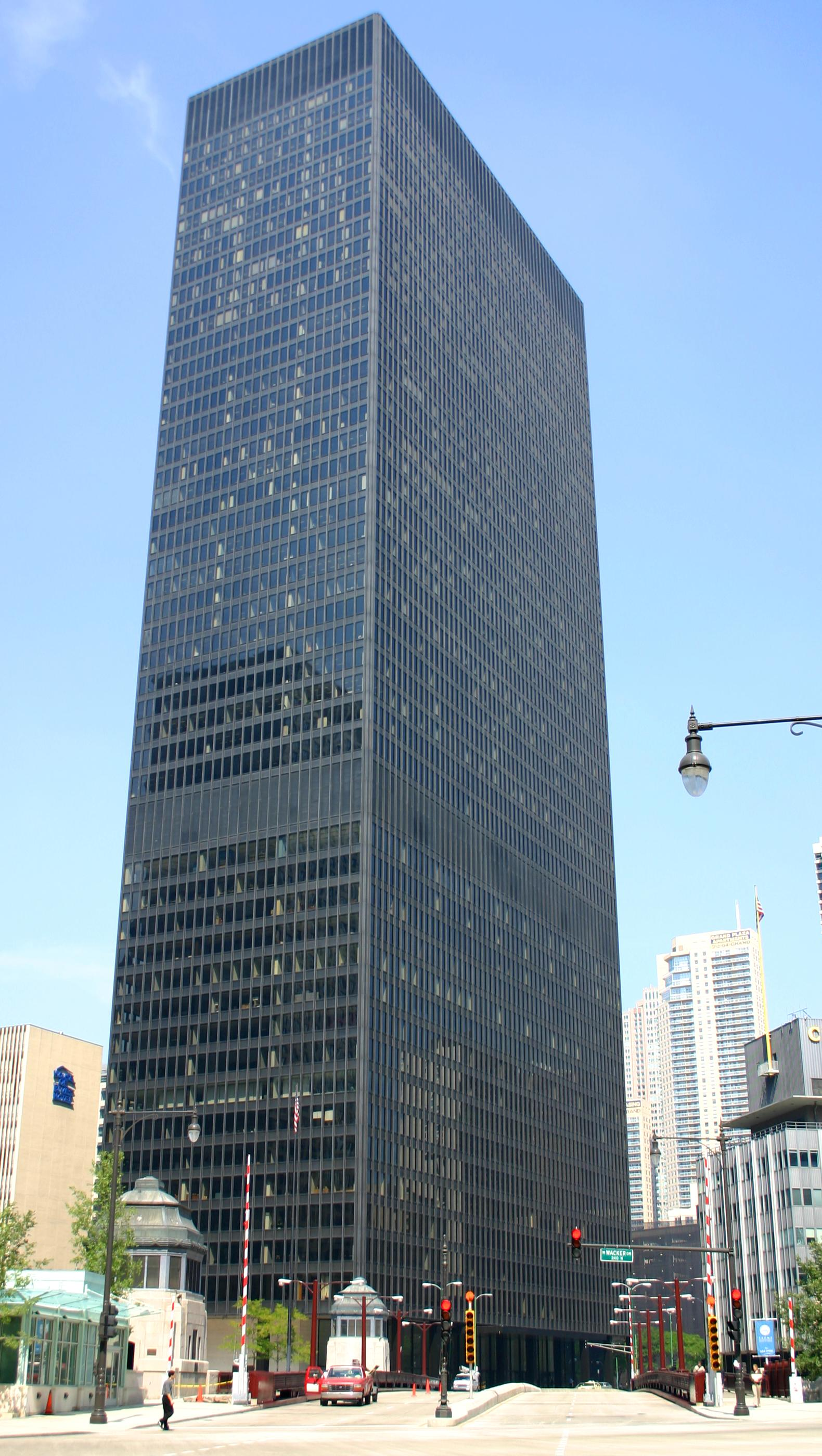
330 North Wabash in Chicago, Illinois, a minimalist building by Ludwig Mies van der Rohe

Minimalist design has been highly influenced by Japanese traditional design and architecture. Long before the Western version and WWII, minimalism was heavily practiced in East Asia beyond artistic movements, as a philosophy and way of life. There are observers who describe the emergence of minimalism as a response to the brashness and chaos of urban life. For example, minimalist architecture began to gain traction in 1980s Japan as a result of the country's rising population and rapid expansion of cities. The design was considered an antidote to the "overpowering presence of traffic, advertising, jumbled building scales, and imposing roadways". The chaotic environment was not only driven by urbanization, industrialization, and technology, but also the Japanese experience of constantly having to demolish structures on account of the destruction wrought by World War II and disasters such as earthquakes and fires. The minimalist design philosophy did not arrive in Japan by way of another country, as it was already part of the Japanese culture rooted on the Zen philosophy. There are those who specifically attribute the design movement to Japan's spirituality and view of nature.

Architect Ludwig Mies van der Rohe (1886–1969) adopted the motto "Less is more" to describe his aesthetic. (Note: See Johnson 1947. A similar sentiment was conveyed by industrial designer Dieter Rams' motto, "Less but better.") His tactic was one of arranging the necessary components of a building to create an impression of extreme simplicity—he enlisted every element and detail to serve multiple visual and functional purposes; for example, designing a floor to also serve as the radiator, or a massive fireplace to also house the bathroom. Designer Buckminster Fuller (1895–1983) adopted the engineer's goal of "Doing more with less", but his concerns were oriented toward technology and engineering rather than aesthetics.

Austrian architect and theorist Adolf Loos published early writings about minimalism in "Ornament and Crime".

=== Concepts and design elements ===
The concept of minimalist architecture is to strip everything to its essential quality and achieve simplicity. The idea is not completely without ornamentation, but that all parts, details, and joinery are considered as reduced to a stage where no one can remove anything further to improve the design.

The considerations for 'essences' are light, form, detail of material, space, place, and human condition. Minimalist architects not only consider the physical qualities of the building. They pay attention to details, people, space, nature, and materials, believing this reveals the abstract quality of something that is invisible and aids the search for the essence of those invisible qualities—such as natural light, sky, earth, and air. In addition, they "open a dialogue" with the surrounding environment to decide the most essential materials for the construction and create relationships between buildings and sites.

In minimalist architecture, design elements strive to convey the message of simplicity. The basic geometric forms, elements without decoration, simple materials, and the repetition of structures represent a sense of order and essential quality. The movement of natural light in buildings reveals simple and clean spaces. In the late 19th century as the arts and crafts movement became popular in Britain, people valued the attitude of 'truth to materials' with respect to the profound and innate characteristics of materials. Minimalist architects humbly 'listen to figure', seeking essence and simplicity by rediscovering the valuable qualities in simple and common materials. Minimalist architecture is meant to declutter a space, attempt to increase functionality and is thought to feel calm and serene. The three principles that architects tend to follow while designing minimalist spaces are: the in, one out rule, zone wise organisation, and the 90/90 rule.

=== Influences from Japanese tradition ===
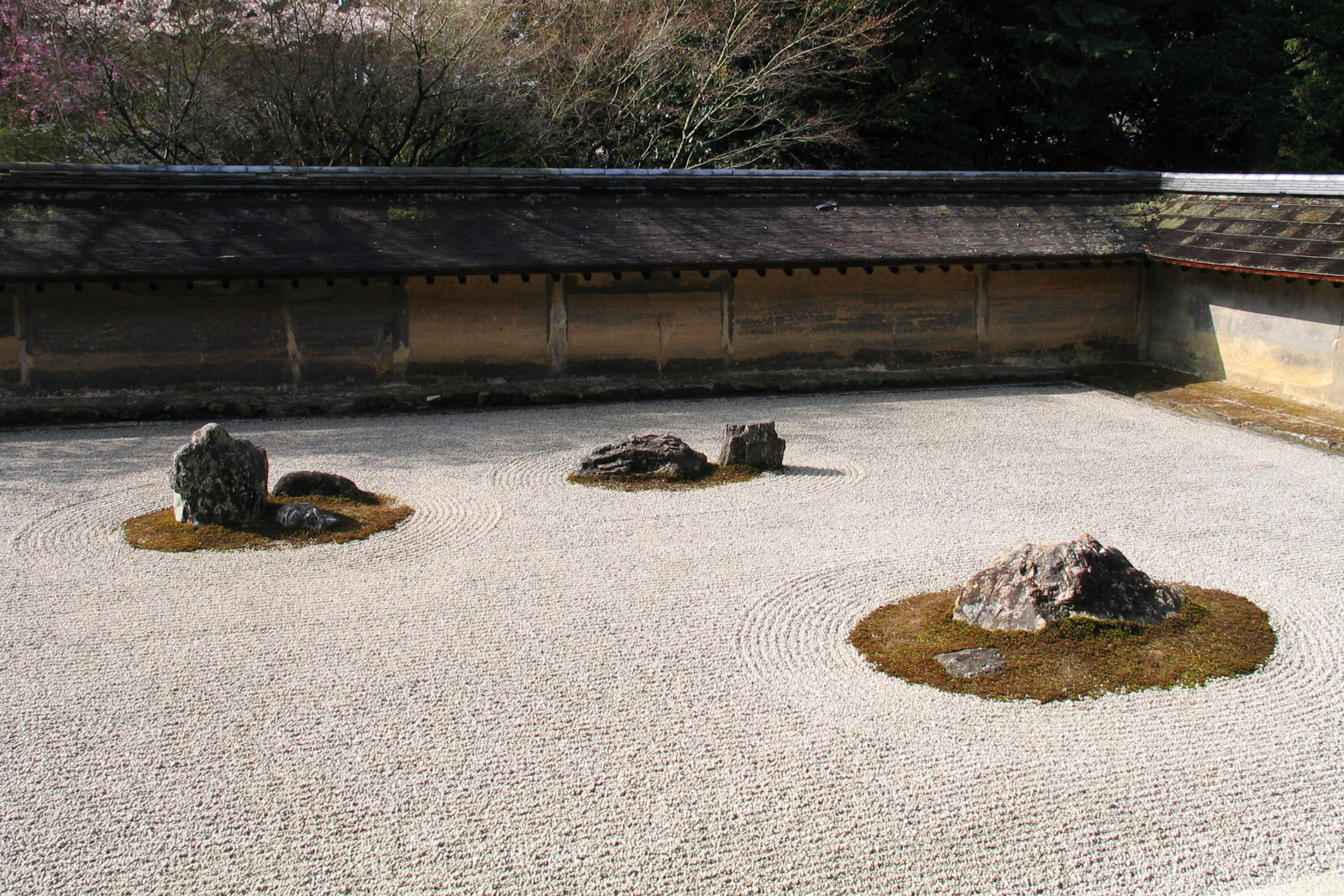
Ryōan-ji dry garden. The clay wall, which is stained by age with subtle brown and orange tones, reflects "wabi" and the rock garden "sabi", together reflecting the Japanese worldview or aesthetic of "wabi-sabi".

The idea of simplicity appears in many cultures, especially the Japanese traditional culture of Zen Buddhist philosophy. The Japanese manipulate the Zen culture into aesthetic and design elements for their buildings. This idea of architecture has influenced Western society, especially in America since the mid-19th century. Moreover, it inspired the minimalist architecture in the 20th century.

Zen concepts of simplicity transmit the ideas of freedom and the essence of living. Simplicity is not only an aesthetic value, but it also has a moral perception that looks into the nature of truth and reveals the inner qualities and essence of materials and objects. For example, the sand garden in Ryōan-ji temple demonstrates the concepts of simplicity and the essentiality from the considered setting of a few stones and a huge empty space.

The Japanese aesthetic principle of Ma refers to empty or open space. It removes all the unnecessary internal walls and opens up the space. The emptiness of spatial arrangement reduces everything to the most essential quality.

The Japanese aesthetic of wabi-sabi values the quality of simple and plain objects. It appreciates the absence of unnecessary features, treasures a life in quietness, and aims to reveal the innate character of materials. For example, the Japanese floral art of ikebana has the central principle of letting the flower express itself. People cut off the branches, leaves, and blossoms from the plants and only retain the essential part of the plant. This conveys the idea of essential quality and innate character in nature.

=== Minimalist architects and their works ===
The Japanese minimalist architect Tadao Ando conveys the Japanese traditional spirit and his own perception of nature in his works. His design concepts are materials, pure geometry, and nature. He normally uses concrete or natural wood and basic structural form to achieve austerity and rays of light in space. He also sets up a dialogue between the site and nature to create relationship and order with the buildings. Ando's works and the translation of Japanese aesthetic principles are influential on Japanese architecture.

Another Japanese minimalist architect, Kazuyo Sejima, works on her own and in conjunction with Ryue Nishizawa, as SANAA, producing iconic Japanese Minimalist buildings. Credited with creating and influencing a particular genre of Japanese Minimalism, Sejima's delicate, intelligent designs may use white color, thin construction sections and transparent elements to create the phenomenal building type often associated with minimalism. Works include New Museum (2010) New York City, Small House (2000) Tokyo, and House surrounded By Plum Trees (2003) Tokyo.

In Vitra Conference Pavilion, Weil am Rhein, 1993, the concepts are to bring together the relationships between building, human movement, site, and nature, which as one main point of minimalism ideology establishes dialogue between the building and site. The building uses the simple forms of circle and rectangle to contrast the filled and void space of the interior and nature. In the foyer, there is a large landscape window that looks to the exterior. This achieves the simple and silence of architecture and enhances the light, wind, time, and nature in space.

John Pawson is a British minimalist architect; his design concepts are soul, light, and order. He believes that though reduced clutter and simplification of the interior to a point that gets beyond the idea of essential quality, there is a sense of clarity and richness of simplicity instead of emptiness. The materials in his design reveal the perception toward space, surface, and volume. Moreover, he likes to use natural materials because of their aliveness, sense of depth and individualized quality. He is also attracted by the important influences from Japanese Zen Philosophy.

Calvin Klein Madison Avenue, New York City, 1995–96, is a boutique that conveys Calvin Klein's ideas of fashion. John Pawson's interior design concepts for this project are to create simple, peaceful and orderly spatial arrangements. He used stone floors and white walls to achieve simplicity and harmony of space. He also emphasizes reduction and eliminates the visual distortions, such as the air conditioning, and lamps, to achieve a sense of purity for the interior.

Alberto Campo Baeza is a Spanish architect that describes his work as essential architecture. He values the concepts of light, idea, and space. Light is essential and achieves the relationship between inhabitants and the building. Ideas are to meet the function and context of space, forms, and construction. Space is shaped by the minimal geometric forms to avoid decoration that is not essential. While both minimalist and contemporary minimalism stress simplicity, there are some significant differences. Minimalism emphasizes only the essentials and employs simple, large-sized components in lesser amounts. Modern minimalism, on the other hand, uses more decorative pieces. While modern minimalism includes eye-catching forms, minimalist designs tend to emphasize geometric shapes and straight lines. Another difference is space; modern minimalism permits trendy items, while minimalist environments are open and empty. While modern minimalism incorporates colorful, seductive elements that accentuate the modern aesthetic while keeping a neutral color scheme, minimalist furniture is necessary and practical. Although simplicity is emphasized in both forms, modern minimalism adds trends and gives places a more lively vibe. It is easier to differentiate between the two types when one is aware of these distinctions.

== Literature ==
Literary minimalism is characterized by an economy with words and a focus on surface description. Minimalist writers eschew adverbs and prefer allowing context to dictate meaning. Readers are expected to take an active role in creating the story, to "choose sides" based on oblique hints and innuendo, rather than react to directions from the writer.

Minimalist writers, or those who are identified with minimalism during certain periods of their writing careers, include Raymond Carver, Ann Beattie, Bret Easton Ellis, Charles Bukowski, K. J. Stevens, Amy Hempel, Bobbie Ann Mason, Tobias Wolff, Grace Paley, Sandra Cisneros, Mary Robison, Frederick Barthelme, Richard Ford, Patrick Holland, Cormac McCarthy, David Leavitt, and Alicia Erian. Stephen Crane and Ernest Hemingway are often cited as precursors to literary minimalism.

Some 1940s-era crime fiction of writers such as James M. Cain and Jim Thompson adopted a stripped-down, matter-of-fact prose style to considerable effect; some classify this prose style as minimalism.

Another strand of literary minimalism arose in response to the metafiction trend of the 1960s and early 1970s (John Barth, Robert Coover, and William H. Gass). These writers were also sparse with prose and kept a psychological distance from their subject matter.

American poets such as William Carlos Williams, early Ezra Pound, Robert Creeley, Robert Grenier, Aram Saroyan, BpNichol, and Geof Huth are sometimes identified with their minimalist style. Saroyan, specifically, is famous for his one-word poem "lighght", which was selected for The American Literary Anthology and received a $750 cash award from the National Endowment for the Arts, which drew outrage from certain conservative American politicians, such as Jesse Helms. BpNichol, a Canadian poet, is famous for such minimalist poems as "st*r", "em ty", and "groww". These minimalist poems were collected into an anthology of BpNichol's works, entitled The Alphabet Game, edited by Darren Werschler-Henry and Lori Emerson. Geof Huth also creates minimalist poetry, and he may be best known for his concept of the pwoermd, the term he uses to describe a poem made up of only a single word.

Depending on the characteristics of the poem, some minimalist poetry may overlap with what others call visual poetry, especially if the concept behind the poem is enhanced by its visual elements. The term "minimalism" is also sometimes associated with the briefest of poetic genres, haiku, which originated in Japan, but has been domesticated in English literature by poets such as Nick Virgilio, Raymond Roseliep, and George Swede.

The Irish writer Samuel Beckett is well known for his minimalist plays and prose, as is the Norwegian writer Jon Fosse.

Dimitris Lyacos's With the People from the Bridge, combining elliptical monologues with a pared-down prose narrative, is a contemporary example of minimalist playwrighting.

In his novel The Easy Chain, Evan Dara includes a 60-page section written in the style of musical minimalism, in particular inspired by composer Steve Reich. Intending to represent the psychological state (agitation) of the novel's main character, the section's successive lines of text are built on repetitive and developing phrases.

== Music ==
The term "minimal music" was derived around 1970 by Michael Nyman from the concept of minimalism, which was earlier applied to the visual arts. More precisely, it was in a 1968 review in The Spectator that Nyman first used the term, to describe a ten-minute piano composition by the Danish composer Henning Christiansen, along with several other unnamed pieces played by Charlotte Moorman and Nam June Paik at the Institute of Contemporary Arts in London.

However, the roots of minimal music are older. In France, Yves Klein allegedly conceived his Monotone Symphony (formally The Monotone-Silence Symphony) between 1947 or 1949 (but premiered only in 1960), a work that consisted of a single 20-minute sustained chord followed by a 20-minute silence.

== Film and cinema ==
In film, minimalism usually is associated with filmmakers such as Robert Bresson, Chantal Akerman, Carl Theodor Dreyer, and Yasujirō Ozu. Their films typically tell a simple story with straightforward camera usage and minimal use of score. Paul Schrader named their kind of cinema: "transcendental cinema". In the present, a commitment to minimalist film making can be seen in film movements such as Dogme 95, mumblecore, and the Romanian New Wave. Abbas Kiarostami, Elia Suleiman, and Kelly Reichardt are also considered minimalist filmmakers.

The Minimalists – Joshua Fields Millburn, Ryan Nicodemus, and Matt D'Avella – directed and produced the film Minimalism: A Documentary, which showcased the idea of minimal living in the modern world.

== In other fields ==
=== Fashion ===
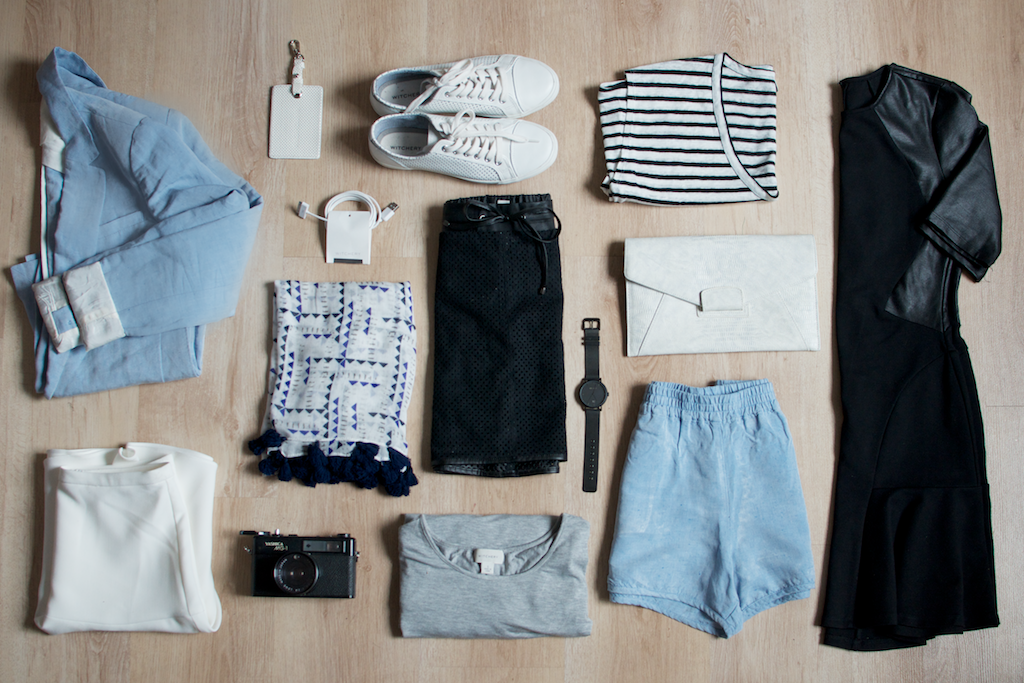
A minimalist woman's wardrobe

The capsule wardrobe is an example of minimalism in fashion. Constructed of only a few staple pieces that do not go out of style, and generally dominated by only one or two colors, capsule wardrobes are meant to be light, flexible, and adaptable, and can be paired with seasonal pieces when the situation calls for them. The modern idea of a capsule wardrobe dates back to the 1970s, and is credited to London boutique owner Susie Faux. The concept was further popularized in the next decade by American fashion designer Donna Karan, who designed a seminal collection of capsule workwear pieces in 1985.

=== Science communication ===
A warming stripes timeline graphic portraying global warming in the industrial era, with blues indicating cooler years and reds indicating warmer years. Warming stripes graphics are deliberately devoid of scientific or technical indicia, for ease of understanding by non-scientists.

To portray global warming to non-scientists, British climate scientist Ed Hawkins developed warming stripes graphics in 2018 that are deliberately devoid of scientific or technical indicia, for ease of understanding by non-scientists. Hawkins explained that "our visual system will do the interpretation of the stripes without us even thinking about it".

Warming stripe graphics resemble color field paintings, stripping out all distractions and using only color to convey meaning. Color field pioneer artist Barnett Newman said he was "creating images whose reality is self-evident", an ethos that Hawkins is said to have applied to the problem of climate change and leading one commentator to remark that the graphics are "fit for the Museum of Modern Art or the Getty."

A tempestry—a portmanteau of "temperature" and "tapestry"—is a tapestry using stripes of specific colors of yarn to represent respective temperature ranges. The tapestries visually represent global warming occurring at given locations.

=== Lifestyle ===
In a lifestyle adopting minimalism, there is an effort to use materials which are most essential and in quantities that do not exceed certain limits imposed by the user themselves. There have been many terms evolved from the concept, like minimalist decors, minimalist skincare, minimalist style, minimalist accessories, etc. All such terms signify the usage of only essential products in that niche into one's life. This can help one to focus on things that are important in one's life. It can reduce waste. It can also save the time of acquiring the excess materials that may be found unnecessary.

A minimalist lifestyle helps to enjoy life with simple things that are available without undue efforts to acquire things that may be bought at great expenses. Minimalism can also lead to less clutter in living spaces.

== See also ==
- Formalism (art)
- Iki (aesthetics)
- KISS principle
- Lyrical abstraction
- Neo-minimalism
- Maximalism
- Minimalism (computing)
- List of minimalist artists
- Neogeo (art)
- Arte Povera

== Notes and references ==
=== Sources ===
- Bertoni, Franco (2002). Minimalist Architecture, edited by Franco Cantini, translated from the Italian by Lucinda Byatt and from the Spanish by Paul Hammond. Basel, Boston, and Berlin: Birkhäuser. ISBN 3-7643-6642-7.
- Cerver, Francisco Asencio (1997). The Architecture of Minimalism. New York: Arco. ISBN 0-8230-6149-3.
- Clark, Robert C. (2014). American literary minimalism. Tuscaloosa, Alabama. ISBN 978-0-8173-8750-1. OCLC 901275325.
- Glaves-Smith, John; Chilvers, Ian (2015). A Dictionary of Modern and Contemporary Art. Oxford University Press. ISBN 978-0-19-179222-9.
- Greene, Roland; et al., eds. (2012). "Minimalism". The Princeton Encyclopedia of Poetry and Poetics (4th rev. ed.). Princeton, New Jersey: Princeton University Press. ISBN 978-0-691-15491-6.
- Johnson, Philip (1947). Mies van der Rohe. Museum of Modern Art.
- Hogan, E. (2008). Spiral Jetta: A Road Trip through the Land Art of the American West. Culture Trails: Adventures in Travel. University of Chicago Press. ISBN 978-0-226-34848-3. Archived from the original on 10 April 2024.
- Lancaster, Clay (September 1953). "Japanese Buildings in the United States before 1900: Their Influence upon American Domestic Architecture". The Art Bulletin. 35 (3): 217–224. doi:10.1080/00043079.1953.11408188.
- Obendorf, Hartmut (2009). Minimalism: designing simplicity. Dordrecht, [The Netherlands]: Springer. ISBN 978-1-84882-371-6. OCLC 432702821.
- Pawson, John (1996). Minimum. London, England: Phaidon Press. ISBN 0-7148-3262-6.
- Rossell, Quim (2005). Minimalist Interiors. New York: Collins Design. ISBN 0-688-17487-6.
- Saito, Yuriko (Winter 2007). "The Moral Dimension of Japanese Aesthetics". The Journal of Aesthetics and Art Criticism. 65 (1): 85–97. doi:10.1111/j.1540-594X.2007.00240.x.
- Shelley, Peter James (2013). Rethinking Minimalism: At the Intersection of Music Theory and Art Criticism (Ph.D thesis). University of Washington. hdl:1773/24092.
