= Ancient history (disambiguation) =

Ancient history is the aggregate of past events from the beginning of recorded human history to the Early Middle Ages or the Postclassical Era.

Ancient History may also refer to:

- Ancient History (novel), a novel by Joseph McElroy
- Ancient History (play), a one-act play by David Ives
- "Ancient History" (song), a song by Prairie Oyster
- "Ancient History" (Justice League Unlimited), a television episode
- "Ancient History" (BoJack Horseman), a 2018 television episode
- Ancient History (album), a 2026 album by Wiki
