= The Letter Left to Me =

Novel by Joseph McElroy

- First edition cover
- Author: Joseph McElroy
- Cover artist: Barbara de Wilde
- Language: English
- Genre: Post-modern fiction
- Published: 1988 (Knopf)
- Media type: Print (Hardback)
- Pages: 152
- ISBN: 978-0-394-57196-6

The Letter Left to Me is Joseph McElroy's seventh novel. A letter from father to son is delivered to the son shortly after the father's death. The letter receives wider and wider circulation, and its continued effect on the son's life is described.

== Plot summary ==
In January 1946, the 15-year-old narrator (unnamed except for the "Junior" that distinguishes him from his father) receives an envelope addressed to him found amongst his late father's papers. The contents are a two-page letter of fatherly advice, identifying Senior's main regrets in life as words of warning. A few bits from the letter are quoted, "bland homilies" and "banal twaddle". Junior initially puzzles over the form of the letter, not really noticing the content: the fact that the letter was dated to three years previously, the fact that it was typed—which his father never did, the fact that he had no idea of its existence, the fact that the envelope itself, addressed to him, had last been seen in a safe-deposit box.

At his mother's suggestion, the letter is shared with the family. An older relative with a print shop prepares, without asking, a hundred copies, causing Junior some small embarrassment at school. And when he goes to college, the Dean gets a copy, and thinks so highly of it, he has copies prepared for and mailed to every student. Although Junior is not identified in these copies, he can't help but be obsessed by how his classmates respond to their copies. He is appalled that some of his friends think the letter is stupid or even fake. On the other hand, he is elated when others find it charming.

== Autobiographical content ==
The Letter Left to Me closely mirrors several details in McElroy's own life. Like Senior, McElroy's father was a scholarship student to Harvard, majored in chemistry, played lacrosse, was rejected by the army, became a stockbroker, raised his family in Brooklyn Heights, and died when his only child, named for him, was 15. (Note: But according to LeClair 1990, McElroy was never "Jr") Junior's mother, like McElroy's, was extremely gifted musically. And like McElroy, Junior attends Poly Prep.

More germane to the development of the novel itself, one finds a parallel to Junior's relationship with his late father extending beyond mere grief. In the years immediately following his father's death, friends of the senior McElroy often shared with the young McElroy comments about his father that McElroy found burdensome:

When I was seventeen or eighteen ... I was very much aware of being in my father's shadow. In the first couple of years after my father died, when I was fifteen, I had it up to here with his old friends saying to me, "Your father was the nicest man I ever knew. If you turn out like your father, that should be good enough for anybody."

— Tom LeClair, 1978 Interview

== Reception ==
McElroy seems to have released a private mystery into the realm of a universal quest...in the slow beauty of rendered detail, we watch as the boy steps into his early manhood with a new integrity of spirit....

— Sheila Ballantyne, The New York Times Book Review

[It] may be his most accessible and easiest to read [novel], though no less elegant .... Really, really try it. (Note: An echo of this review of an earlier McElroy novel, mentioned by Masters, to "Really, try it.")

— Hilary Masters, The Washington Post Book World
