= Cannonball (novel) =

2013 book by Joseph McElroy

- First edition cover
- Author: Joseph McElroy
- Cover artist: G. Davis Cathcart
- Language: English
- Genre: Postmodern literature
- Published: 2013
- Publisher: Dzanc Books
- Publication place: United States
- Media type: Print (paperback)
- Pages: 312
- ISBN: 978-1-938604-21-8

Cannonball is Joseph McElroy's ninth novel. Set in Southern California and Iraq, it tells the story of Zach, a young and naive military photographer who stumbles upon a secret network of underground water pipes ("horizontal wells") in Iraq used to smuggle what are apparently scrolls containing the original prosperity Gospel, an interview with Jesus peddling free market doctrine.

== Plot summary ==
The novel opens in medias res with Zach photographing a palace that had belonged to Saddam Hussein. At the palace's swimming pool, he is stunned to see his friend Umo on the diving board.

The novel then backtracks. Zach, in high school, was on the swim team, coached by his father, a veteran. Zach had been both a swimmer and a diver until an accident, when he had been interrupted by a shout from his father during a mildly complicated dive, and he gave up diving. After graduating, in 2002 he was cajoled, almost tricked, into joining the army, and ended up as a photographer specialist.

Umo, about the same age as Zach, is an unschooled homeless illegal immigrant odd-jobber from somewhere in China or Mongolia who seems to know everything important. Because of his "three hundred and some pound" obesity, he is spectacular at "cannonballs", but surprisingly he turns out to also be a skilled, acrobatic, diver.

While on Operation Scroll Down, Zach arrives at the palace where the Scrolls are due to arrive. Taking endless numbers of pictures, he is first caught be surprise by Umo's presence, and then more so during Umo's dive, when an explosion destroys the pool. Climbing into the wreckage to rescue his friend, Zach finds no trace of Umo, but does find a badly wounded military chaplain, the secret piping, and the Scrolls.

Zach tries to explore what appears to be a conspiracy, but he makes very little headway. Back at home, he has an acquaintance translate the Scrolls, but finds danger closing in on him. He re-enlists, and at some point testifies on what happened, but fails to solve the mysteries of what happened.

== Reception ==
=== Preview ===
This, his first novel in many a moon, concerns the Iraq War, among other things, and it’s hard to think of an author more suited to reimagining the subject.

— Garth Risk Hallberg, The Millions

=== Reviews ===
Cannonball is one of the most realistic and pleasurably challenging depictions of the protean world and ever-reconfiguring mind that I’ve read ... McElroy uses contemporary surfaces to entice us into an epistemology, a “calculus cure” for reductionism ....

— Tom LeClair, The Daily Beast

McElroy forces the reader to work in order to highlight his belief that knowledge is not a given ..., in the hope that Cannonball might be — in the words of one of his soldiers — a “weapon of mass instruction”.

— Stephen J. Burn, Times Literary Supplement

More than simply psychological realism or political critique, Cannonball is a significant artistic achievement—a brilliant novel of consciousness and conscience.

— Trey Strecker, The Quarterly Conversation

Laudable for its brio alone, Cannonball marries adolescent fumbling to Orwellian nightmare, while developing a deliciously wicked fantasy out of our country's Iraq misadventure.

— John Domini, Bookforum

The story itself, with its depiction of an America asserting its will both through war abroad and propaganda at home, might at best be called a satire (without much humor) of America in the process of hollowing itself out, deliberately becoming the worst caricature of its self-proclaimed “destiny” as a nation.

— Daniel Green, Full Stop

== Bibliography ==
- Burn, Stephen J. (October 8, 2013). "Difficulty factor". Times Literary Supplement: 19.
- Domini, John (October 21, 2013). "Cannonball by Joseph McElroy". Bookforum.
- Green, Daniel (August 8, 2013). "Cannonball – Joseph McElroy". Full Stop.
- Hallberg, Garth Risk (July 8, 2013). "Most Anticipated: The Great Second-Half 2013 Book Preview". The Millions.
- LeClair, Tom (July 7, 2013). "Joseph McElroy's 'Cannonball' is the Meta Iraq War Novel". The Daily Beast.
- McLaughlin, Robert L. (May–June 2014). "Cannonball". American Book Review. 35 (4): 10. doi:10.1353/abr.2014.0069. S2CID 143143026.
- Strecker, Trey (December 2, 2013). "Cannonball by Joseph McElroy". The Quarterly Conversation.
