= The Lost Scrapbook =

Book by Evan Dara

- First edition
- Author: Evan Dara
- Language: English
- Genre: Postmodernism; Ecofiction
- Published: 1995
- Publisher: FC2; Aurora
- Publication place: United States
- Pages: 476 pages
- ISBN: 978-0980226614

The Lost Scrapbook (1995) is a novel by the American writer Evan Dara. It won the 12th Annual FC2 Illinois State University National Fiction Competition judged by William T. Vollmann.

The novel is a prime example of ecofiction, and culminates in a battle between a fictional Missouri town named Isaura and the Ozark chemical company, which has been the economic lynchpin for the community for many decades. The company is accused of releasing toxic waste which has poisoned the groundwater.

Writing in the Washington Post, Tom LeClair compares the book favorably to The Recognitions by William Gaddis, saying:

"This first novel resembles the ambitious debuts of McElroy (A Smuggler's Bible) and Pynchon (V), but author Evan Dara pushes the bar back upward toward Recognitions-height. With The Lost Scrapbook Dara asks readers to vault into an insistently bookish book, a dangerous and courageous request in an age of Web browsers and Net servers....I'd hate to see The Lost Scrapbook lost for 30 years, as The Recognitions went unrecognized, because Dara is a consummate ventriloquist of our time's voices and a remarkable ringmaster of our culture's circus acts....At the end of The Recognitions a composer finally plays his own music in a cathedral, hits a very difficult note, and brings the cathedral down on his head. Dara has taken a similar risk with his Beethoven-influenced novel of variations."
