= Plus (novel) =

Novel by Joseph McElroy

- First edition cover
- Author: Joseph McElroy
- Cover artist: Fred Marcellino
- Language: English
- Genre: Post-modern science fiction
- Published: 1977 (Knopf)
- Media type: Print (Hardback)
- Pages: 215
- ISBN: 978-0-394-40794-4

Plus is Joseph McElroy's fifth novel. Set in some unspecified future, it tells the story of Imp Plus, a disembodied brain controlling IMP, the Interplanetary Monitoring Platform, in earth orbit. The novel consists of Imp Plus's thoughts as he tries to comprehend his limited existence, while struggling with language, limited memories, and communicating with Ground Control. The plot is driven by Imp Plus's recall of fragments of his past and of language, his improving comprehension of his present, all while his medical condition gradually deteriorates.

McElroy denies that the novel is science fiction, unless "science" is used in its etymological sense of "knowing".

The novel was reprinted as an e-book by Dzanc Books in 2014, with an introductory 2012 poem "A Green of its Own Breathing" by Sarah Grindley, dedicated to "Joe McElroy & Imp Plus".

== Sources ==
McElroy acknowledges three technical sources:

- Lehninger, Albert L. (1973). Bioenergetics (2nd ed.). Benjamin.
- Noback, Charles R. (1967). The Human Nervous System. McGraw-Hill.
- Weiss, Paul (1969). Principles of Development. Hafner.

== Reception ==
The gradual derangement of Imp Plus ... is observed with the lurid precision of brilliant microphotography. McElroy's slow, demanding traceries of awareness do not always escape tedium; it is the price of the strange and valuable task he has set himself. An exhausting, disorienting work of discovery.

— –, Kirkus Reviews

Remarkable...brilliant...very moving...McElroy's achievement...may help us home from the apocalypse: Humanity is not what we've lost, it is what we grimly hang onto, even when we're not persuaded that it's still there.

— Michael Wood, The New York Times Book Review
