= Actress in the House =

Novel by Joseph McElroy

- Cover of the 1st edition
- Author: Joseph McElroy
- Cover artist: Yellowstone Ltd, based on this Gilda film poster
- Language: English
- Genre: Post-modern romance
- Published: 2003 (Overlook Press)
- Media type: Print (Hardback)
- Pages: 432
- ISBN: 978-1-58567-350-6

Actress in the House is Joseph McElroy's eighth novel. Lawyer Bill Daley follows up an unusual phone call from stage actress Becca Lang by attending her show. Daley is appalled when Becca is slugged rather brutally in what was clearly supposed to have been a stage slap. He stays afterward, and she moves into his life.

== Plot summary ==
The novel is told in three portions, "First Night", "First Week", "First Love", and a short epilogue, "Extend". Several time frames are included in the novel, mostly told using the present tense, frequently with no direct indication that the present tense of one book section is unrelated to the present tense of the immediately previous book section. The main events of the novel are set in 1970, late 1982 to early 1983, and late 1996.

Set mainly in downtown Manhattan, the main characters are Bill Daley, an American lawyer in his mid-40s, and Becca Lang, a Canadian actress in her mid-20s. Bill's wife Della died of an aggressive illness in late 1983, after seven years of marriage. Bill's brother Wolf lives in Seattle with his wife and two children. He is a civil engineer specializing in geology, who tends to get injured on the job.

=== First Night ===
One late afternoon, November 1996, stage actress Becca Lang makes a strange call to Bill Daley's law office. She says she is looking for help regarding an eviction, Daley tries to beg off, saying it is not his area of practice, but the call intrigues him enough to keep him listening, and then to track her play Unwed Blood down, and he books two tickets for that Wednesday night. He puzzles trying to figure out who "van Diamond" is, the man who Becca claims recommended she call Daley.

Daley attends with Helen, his usual companion. They are slightly bothered by Leander, who is sitting in front of them. At the climax of the first act, Becca tells Barry (playing Becca's brother) that she has told his wife about his adultery. And Barry slaps Becca excessively hard, drawing blood, and Becca staggers, almost off the stage.

During intermission, Daley talks to Leander, outside, offering to help him find a job. Leander does not return for the second act. After the show, Helen goes home alone, Daley goes backstage, talks with Barry, then has the empty stage to himself. Becca comes up from the seats to talk to Daley, and after a while, Daley reveals that he is the lawyer she called two days before. They go out for a long night together, and end up at Daley's home. Along the way, Becca talks about herself, her sticky situation, and also very knowledgeably about the history of New York.

In cut-ins, we learn of the night in 1982 when Lotta, a sometime client, calls Daley in the middle of the night because a small earthquake causes some of her ceramic fake art to fall off a shelf and shatter. She intends to sue Connecticut, the location of the epicenter. Unable to get back to sleep, Daley calls Wolf, who invites Daley to Australia for one week, part of an engineering project Wolf will be consulting for. Daley goes, leaving his wife Della with their surprise guest, Ruley Duymens, a banker who is interested in financing Della's dance group.

Daley's interest in Becca increases when he realizes "van Diamond" is Becca's phonetic version of Ruley's name.

=== First Week ===
Becca performs for Daley a one-woman autobiographical show, something Becca is thinking of performing for the public. Her life seems to have included ambiguous abuse, possibly incestuous, involving her father and her older brother Bruce, but it's unclear if Becca thinks there is anything wrong. Similarly, Becca returns to Unwed Blood as if the slap witnessed by Daley was just an aberration, not worth being concerned about.

Becca is also under pressure from the play's producer Beck to stay in the show, which he wants to take uptown. Beck is providing, through Bruce, for her large but mostly empty Manhattan loft. They pay a visit to her place. The super shows up, and makes it clear that so far as he knows, her eviction is proceeding.

Daley and Becca develop a casual, Platonic intimacy. They are sleeping together in the nude, yet apparently not having any sex.

=== First Love ===
Becca knows something of Daley's involvement with a war atrocity when he served in Vietnam, and Daley, taken aback, tells her the full story, involving three Cambodian POWs, one adult woman Cambodian POW, Than, whom Daley knew, and one tween Cambodian girl. Taken up in a helicopter for transfer, the POWs are bound. Daley is given solo controls for a brief moment, not really knowing what he's doing, and when the pilot takes the controls back, the five Cambodians are gone.

Daley evicts Becca Monday morning. Tuesday morning, at the end of his run, Daley sees Bruce Lang sitting on his step, waiting for him. They talk, and eventually Daley tells Bruce of the time he saw Ruley, during diving lessons for Della, slap her brutally.

=== Extend ===
Becca moves back.

== Reception ==
And in the end, as after a disquieting dream, I knew I had been in a hypnotic sort of elsewhere...this most singular and stylistically uncompromising of novels.

— Sven Birkerts, The New York Times

Joseph McElroy's dazzling, multidimensional novel brilliantly unfolds.... Actress is a remarkable, insightful novel....

— Trey Strecker, The Review of Contemporary Fiction

[McElroy's] attempts to give ordinary events a fateful resonance can sometimes seem strained, and the slow pace of the narrative may put off some readers, but those who persevere will find a rewarding conclusion.

— Jeff Zalesky, Publishers Weekly

Over a 40-year career, McElroy has been compared to William Gaddis, Don DeLillo, and Thomas Pynchon. This absorbing and unsettling novel, his first in 14 years, may finally bring him the wider recognition he deserves.

— Meredith Parets, Booklist

Literary heavyweight McElroy returns with his eighth novel.... To [his] credit, the characters are complex and become more fascinating the more we learn about their backgrounds and interests. Not an easy read in part because of McElroy's writing style, this novel nevertheless would be appropriate for academic fiction collections, as it is a mature modern work by an unusual contemporary writer.

— Maureen Neville, Library Journal

[It is] a novel of such astonishing complexity that it is almost unreadable—and I mean that as a compliment.

— Andrew Essex, The Village Voice
