= Evan Dara =

American novelist

- Occupation: Writer
- Writing career
- Genre: Literary Fiction
- Notable works: The Lost Scrapbook (1995); The Easy Chain (2008); Flee (2013); Provisional Biography of Mose Eakins (2018); Permanent Earthquake (2021)
- Movement: Postmodernism
- Website: aurora148.com/index.php

Evan Dara is an American novelist. He has published four novels and one play, which are concerned with subjects including social atomization, music, political dysfunction, epistemology, ecology, and time. The Times Literary Supplement (London) called Dara "one of the most exciting American novelists writing today."

Widely believed to be using a pseudonym, Dara has given no interviews and has issued no photographs, and has chosen to publish his recent novels in English through his own press, Aurora. His work has been almost totally unacknowledged by the commercial American literary community—Australian critic Emmett Stinson has called Dara "the best-kept secret in all of contemporary American literature"—but he has received exceptional acclaim from underground and alternative sites.

Dara's books have been the subject of numerous scholarly articles and theses, and have been taught in dozens of colleges and universities across the world. His work has been (or soon will be) published by 11 international publishers in 8 languages, including Spanish, Japanese, Italian, Portuguese, German, Russian, Turkish, and Dutch, something virtually unknown amongst self-published authors.

Four months after Dara's first publication in Spanish, his work was included in a Madrid University course on the great American novel, where Dara's work was read alongside that of Herman Melville, Nathaniel Hawthorne, William Faulkner, F. Scott Fitzgerald, Jack Kerouac, Philip Roth, Thomas Pynchon, and Toni Morrison. The only other writer of Dara's generation to be included in this survey was David Foster Wallace.

In 1995, his first novel, The Lost Scrapbook, won the 12th Annual FC2 Illinois State University National Fiction Competition judged by William T. Vollmann. Dara's second novel, The Easy Chain, was published by Aurora Publishers in 2008. A third novel, Flee, was published by Aurora in 2013. His fourth novel, Permanent Earthquake, was published by Aurora in June 2021.

On July 26, 2018, Dara released his first play, titled Provisional Biography of Mose Eakins. The play was only offered in eBook form (ePub, Mobi, and PDF), and the publisher had originally stipulated that readers should download it for free and only make a donation after they finish it (the copy is no longer available for download on Aurora Publishers' website).

In 2020, the critic Daniel Green published the first comprehensive look at Dara's novels, called "Giving Voice: On the Work of Evan Dara." Green writes that: "In the audacity of [their] invention...Dara’s novels are arguably the most radically disruptive books in American fiction since, say, Gilbert Sorrentino in a work like Mulligan Stew (1979)."

== Anonymity ==
As opposed to other reclusive American writers such as J.D. Salinger, Thomas Pynchon, and Harper Lee, nothing is known about Dara's background or the reasons why he writes under a pseudonym. And unlike the pseudonymous Elena Ferrante, Dara has never given an interview or commented on his books. However, he has responded on separate occasions about the influence of William Gaddis on his style. In an indirect reply to a query from the critic Tom LeClair—in which he confirmed that he uses a pseudonym—Dara denied having read either The Recognitions or J R. In 2014, the critic Steven Moore followed up on this question:

"Asked about Gaddis’s possible influence, Dara told me that while working on The Lost Scrapbook he heard that J R was a novel in dialogue and checked it out from The American Library in Paris: ‘Took the novel home, plunked it open, tapped it shut — didn’t want the influence’ (email January 19, 2014).”

== Writing ==
The first edition of The Lost Scrapbook was published in 1995 by Fiction Collective Two, or FC2, which was then based at Illinois State University in Normal, Illinois. The manuscript was originally brought to the publisher's attention by novelist Richard Powers, who described how he received it:

“Several kilos of transatlantic, boat-rate typescript arrived on my stoop without prior warning of contents, and I’ve been grateful ever since. Dara shows how a novel can be experimental, yet moral, rule breaking but emotional, and post-humanist while still remaining deeply human. This scrapbook builds in stretches until the whole police blotter cum family album lies open in aerial view. Monumental, unforgiving, cunning and heartfelt, it lets no one off the hook, least of all the reader.”

The mystery surrounding Dara combined with the fact that Powers very rarely provides blurbs led some to speculate that Powers might be the man behind the nom de plume. Nonetheless, despite very little press coverage and limited publicity, the book has been taught at over 25 universities and been the subject of significant scholarly inquiry.

In 2008, Dara released The Easy Chain through Aurora Publishers, a venture he founded along with another partner. He followed this up with Flee, which was published by Aurora in 2013.

Dara published his first play, Provisional Biography of Mose Eakins, in 2018. It was translated into Portuguese in 2020.

His most recent novel is Permanent Earthquake, which was published in 2021.

== Translations ==
A Spanish translation of Dara's The Lost Scrapbook was published by Málaga-based publisher Pálido Fuego in 2015, entitled El Cuaderno Perdido. Estado Critico recognized it with the Best Translation Award of 2015.

A Spanish translation of The Easy Chain was also published by Pálido Fuego in 2019, called La cadena fácil. El Plural named it one of the most solid and imaginative novels of the year ("una de las novelas más sólidas e imaginativas del año).

In 2022, a Portuguese translation of The Lost Scrapbook was published by 7Letras, entitled O caderno perdido.

In November 2024, a Japanese edition was published by Genki Shobo, featuring a translation by Yoshihiko Kihara, who has also provided award-winning translations of William Gaddis’s JR and Richard Powers’s The Overstory.

== Works ==
- The Lost Scrapbook (1995)
  - Spanish Translation: El Cuaderno Perdido (2015)
  - Portuguese Translation: O caderno perdido (2022)
  - Japanese Translation: Ushinawareta Sukurappubukku (2024)
  - Dutch translation: Het verdwenen plakboek, by Iannis Goerlandt (2025)
- The Easy Chain (2008)
  - Spanish Translation: La cadena fácil (2019)
- Flee (2013)
- Provisional Biography of Mose Eakins (2018)
- Permanent Earthquake (2021)

== Awards ==
- Winner of 12th Annual FC2 National Fiction Competition
- Estado Critico: Best Translation Award of 2015
