= Lookout Cartridge =

Novel by Joseph McElroy

- First edition
- Author: Joseph McElroy
- Cover artist: Fred Marcellino
- Language: English
- Genre: Post-modern techno-thriller
- Published: 1974 (Knopf)
- Media type: Print (Hardback)
- Pages: 531
- ISBN: 978-0-394-49375-6

Lookout Cartridge is Joseph McElroy's fourth novel, published by Knopf in 1974.

The narrator, Cartwright, had made with his friend Dagger an art film/documentary about power using loaned professional equipment, with scenes set in Stonehenge, Hyde Park, and other locations in England, plus one scene in Ajaccio, Corsica. But someone destroyed it, and when acquaintances in New York press Cartwright for information about an alleged second print, the sound track, and even his personal diary, he finds himself trying to find out what really happened. Doing so involves multiple trips between New York and England, including a visit to the Hebrides and the Stones of Callanish, and increasing danger and death.

Larry McCaffery ranked Lookout Cartridge 39th in his top 100 20th-century English novels list.

== Film summary ==
The separate scenes are:

- Bonfire in Wales - Supposedly come upon spontaneously, Cartwright's discovery that Dagger had planned it ahead of time is his first proof that there has been something sinister going on.
- Unplaced Room - Starring an anonymous US AWOL who arrived via remote Scottish islands.
- Suitcase Slowly Packed
- Hawaiian Hippie aka Hawaiian in the Underground - Bill Liliuokalani
- Hyde Park Softball
- Stonehenge
- Corsican Montage
- Marvelous Country House - With Apollo 15 on the television set being ignored.
- USAF Base

== Style ==
The language of film, computer technology, information theory, and liquid crystals permeate the novel.

McElroy tried to make the novel as "cinematic" as possible, filled with information. The sentences were made deliberately labyrinthine, meant to be on the edge of incomprehensibility, yet to always feel as if significant clues had to be present.

In the 1985 Carroll and Graf paperback reprint, McElroy wrote an introduction "One Reader to Another". He starts by stating that he recalls some French writer "arguing that fiction can't compete with film in visual immediacy." He recalls that his reaction then and in 1985 is that, "by magic ink-sign crypto-telepathy, words in the right sequence can transmit between remote minds the mind's motion pictures."

== Reception ==
For its technical brilliance, its unremitting intelligence, for the rich complexity of the homologies and analogies between its systems and the fearful times we live in, Lookout Cartridge is the rarest kind of achievement.

— George Stade, The New York Times Book Review

Spectacular, richly imagined . . . an excruciatingly difficult book to put down.

— The Cleveland Plain Dealer

... a hypnagogic blowup of the metaphor of survival even if ... survival no longer seems very important.

— Kirkus Reviews

Very hard to read, and very much worth the effort.

— Bruce Allen, Library Journal, 2/1/1975
