= Hind's Kidnap =

Book by Joseph McElroy

- Cover of the 1st edition
- Author: Joseph McElroy
- Cover artist: James Spanfeller
- Language: English
- Genre: Postmodern literature
- Publisher: 1969 (Harper and Row)
- Media type: Print (Hardback)
- Pages: 534
- ISBN: 978-0-89366-105-2

Hind's Kidnap: A Pastoral on Familiar Airs is Joseph McElroy's second novel. Ostensibly it is a mystery concerning a six-year-old unsolved kidnapping, one that the 6'7" protagonist Jack Hind had tried to solve at the time. His marriage falling apart, Hind obsessively follows a treasure hunt of planted clues that lead him around New York and New England, but he finds nothing helpful concerning the kidnapping. As the novel proceeds, Hind is revealed to be obsessive in general, given to focusing on all sorts of trivialities in his life, both past and present.

== Plot summary ==
Six years before the novel begins, Jack Hind was obsessed with solving the Hershey Laurel kidnapping. With the Laurel parents Sears and Shirley dead, and no ransom note received, the police effectively closed the case, and told Hind to quit, which he did upon marriage to Sylvia.

Several aspects of Hind's life are revealed during the novel. Hind's parents died when he was young and willed that Hind be raised by a guardian who was a bachelor and unrelated to Hind. Hind seems to have inherited well—the guardian left him a "viaticum" (Note: p. 246)—the closest Hind does to work is recording people for a radio show, "Naked Voice", and some substitute teaching at a college.

The novel itself is divided into three parts.

=== "Faith, or The First Condition" ===
The novel begins with the chapter "Faith, or The First Condition", (Note: The chapter title is an allusion to Vatican I: So the fathers of the fourth council of Constantinople, following the footsteps of their predecessors, published this solemn profession of faith: The first condition of salvation is to maintain the rule of the true faith. — Session Four, "Decrees of the First Vatican Council". Papal Encyclicals Online. June 29, 1868.) which sees Hind running down three flights of stairs in his building. Intending to visit Sylvia, his estranged wife living one block away, on a peace mission, he surprises a very tall elderly woman putting a note in his mailbox. As the woman leaves, Hind takes the note, which reads, "If you're still trying to break the kidnap, visit the pier by the hospital." Immediately, Hind is obsessed with the Laurel case all over again and heads to the pier. He begins a daily vigil and is eventually awarded when he eavesdrops on two people of Asian descent, one of whom mentions Hershey Laurel. They take off, and Hind follows. Hind loses them when they go into the headquarters of Santos-Dumont Sisters, Incorporated.

Hind's friend, Madison "Maddy" Beecher runs the Center for Total Research, a spin-off of S-D housed in the same building complex. Hind visits Beecher, but Beecher likes to talk, so Hind is unable to get the help he expected. Beecher dragoons Hind into joining Beecher with his wife Flo and their 9-year-old son for dinner. Beecher mentions a somewhat crazed phone call at work about a mad genius named, to the best of Beecher's memory, "Lowell, Lawlor, Laura." The closeness to Laurel is enough to convince Hind that this is a clue.

Returning home, Hind thinks he sees the same elderly woman again. Rather than chase after the woman, he heads to his vestibule to see what note she may have left and is rewarded with "Hooked with a wood, into the forest, it will lead you well beyond the pier—if you're interested." Hind interprets it as a reference to Ashley Sill and his golf-course-country-club. Hind waits two weeks, and then drives the three hundred miles to the Sills' place, located about 10–20 miles from the Laurel home and the last place young Hershey had been seen. Hind is surprised to learn that he was expected, with the Sills tipped off by Sylvia.

The next morning, meditating on the clue, the word "well" catches his attention, and he thinks it's a reference to the well on the Laurel property. Visiting, he talks with the current resident, whose polite talk is interpreted by Hind as another clue, with veiled references to his friend Dewey Wood back in the city. (Note: pp. 108,119) Hind spends time with Wood, hanging onto his every word, expecting a clue to drop. But Wood mostly wants to talk about Oliver Plane, who has irresponsibly abandoned his summer teaching duties just as classes are about to begin. At some point, another acquaintance comments on Plane's general lack of maturity, referring to "a child inside Oliver trying to get out," (Note: p. 159) at which point Hind realizes he must talk to Plane.

Hind ends up substituting for Plane. He tries to see clues on campus or in anything connected with his students. He has an affair with one of the students, Laura Rosenblum, and naturally discusses the Laurel case with her, and her final essay for the course refers to the kidnapping in ways that taunt Hind: "Call the kidnapers Sylvia and Jack, Mr. Hind, call the kid May... how like our own life is this event!" The section ends with Hind concluding he should return to Sylvia. (Note: pp. 231–6)

=== II ===
This part is a long monologue by Sylvia. Almost every paragraph begins with a "V". At first addressing May, then Jack, she continues even after Jack falls asleep. (Note: "wake-wake, Jack", p. 328, "before you wake now", p. 331.) Sylvia talks about herself and Jack, and their friends, in great, disjointed detail.

=== C ===
Hind takes Sylvia's monologue as a clue to treat people as people, not clues: "Take each person formerly a clue and ignore the Laurel utterly. If any one was to be a true clue, any one could be so only leading nowhere." (Note: p. 344.) Thus Hind resolves to reverse the treasure hunt of clues.

== Reception ==
Hind's Kidnap is a view of a sunken cathedral. A thoroughly cogent, marvelous, intricate, even awesome structure, the cathedral in Hind's Kidnap is encountered like a fish coming upon Chartres in the ocean depths.

— Walker Percy, dust jacket

[Hind's Kidnap] is a novel which is in many ways an unusual and distinguished work of the imagination.

— J. G. Farrell, The Spectator, London

It is full of marvels.... All is code in Hind's Kidnap; and deciphered, it's dazzling.

— John Leonard, The New York Times

The excellent but dumfoundingly prolix result is an often funny, painfully intense psychological detective story filled with Double-Crostics, Nabokovian word games and revelations that tantalizingly obscure as much as they reveal....It requires dedication and patience to follow the trail of Hind's windings and unwindings, though the reader's kidnaped hours are in the end handsomely ransomed. Along the way, it is often difficult to see de Forrest for the trees—even with, or from, what McElroy calls "Hind's height."

— Time, "Present Imperfect".
