= The Easy Chain =

2008 novel by Evan Dara

- Author: Evan Dara
- Language: English
- Genre: Postmodernism
- Published: 2008
- Publisher: Aurora
- Publication place: United States
- ISBN: 978-0980226607

The Easy Chain (2008) is the second novel by the American writer Evan Dara.

It tells the story of Lincoln Selwyn, the son of British parents who grows up in the Netherlands and, following a period of aimless wandering in his 20s, decides to attend the University of Chicago due to its rigorous curriculum. However, after one semester at school, he "quickly climbs the social ladder to become one of the most influential people in the city, but he just as suddenly disappears, leaving no trace of his whereabouts." The back cover summarizes his journey by saying, "Over the last nine months, this charismatic blond with the irresistible accent vaulted to the top of the city's social hierarchy, slept with the majority of its first daughters and racked up an unimaginable fortune."

"It's a standard enough plot for a novel, except readers familiar with The Lost Scrapbook will know going in that almost nothing about a Dara novel is standard—or easy. The magic of his writing and what he accomplishes through it is, despite its difficulty, obscurity, density, and abstractness, manifested in how mesmerizing, hypnotizing, and just plain readable Evan Dara is."

Two of the more unusual aspects of the novel are the 40-page break midway through the book, which are blank save for a smattering of dashes, words, and ellipses, as well as a 60-page section written in rhythmic and repetitive verse.

== Translation ==
In 2019, the Spanish house Pálido Fuego published a translation of The Easy Chain, entitled La cadena fácil. Critical reaction to the book was very positive, with Mariano Hortal offering it up as one of his 32 book recommendations for the fall. Hortal wrote:

"Una historia exigente y compleja que volverá a deleitar a aquellos que buscamos retos a la hora de afrontar obras distintas y que sean diferentes de la media. Aquí no nos va faltar nada de eso. Me temo que puede ser una de las obras del año" ("A demanding and complex story that will delight those who seek challenges when facing different works and that are different from the average. We are not going to miss any of that. I fear it may be one of the works of the year.")

Writing in El Plural, Jose Angel Barrueco concludes his review of the book ("una de las novelas más sólidas e imaginativas del año") by writing:

"Esta crítica hacia las imposturas y hacia las falsedades del mundo contemporáneo Evan Dara las introduce o las camufla mediante la sátira y merced a unos personajes al borde del delirio oral, quienes a veces ensartan en sus circunloquios y en sus comentarios algunas sentencias asombrosas. Si en la primera mitad del libro tenemos claro lo que sucede, en la segunda las narraciones se vuelven más difusas, y, si en algunos pasajes sabemos lo que sucede (por ejemplo, cuando Lincoln busca a su madre en Europa), en otros sólo obtenemos leves indicios (por ejemplo, en la especie de canción o poema con versos repetidos). Pero en realidad da igual: lo que importa es la cadencia, el ritmo, las técnicas que utiliza Dara. Si la primera parte nos suena a William Gaddis, en la segunda casi podemos sentir la sombra de James Joyce y sus múltiples técnicas de Ulises." Translation: "This criticism of the impostures and the falsehoods of the contemporary world Evan Dara introduces or camouflages them through satire and thanks to some characters on the verge of oral delirium, who sometimes skewer some amazing sentences in their circumlocutions and in their comments. If in the first half of the book we are clear about what happens, in the second half the narratives become more diffuse, and, if in some passages we know what happens (for example, when Lincoln looks for his mother in Europe), in others only we get slight clues (for example, in the kind of song or poem with repeated verses). But it doesn't really matter: what matters is the cadence, the rhythm, the techniques that Dara uses. If the first part sounds like William Gaddis, in the second we can almost feel the shadow of James Joyce and his many techniques of Ulysses."

== Critical reception ==
While the original publication of The Easy Chain did not garner much critical attention—due in part to the work being self-published—there was a select group of writers who sought out the novel and offered insight.

- In the American Book Review, Stephen Burn wrote, "The fluidity and ambition of the novel's constantly evolving narrative technique rewards and requires further study, and if The Lost Scrapbook resembled a de-centered JR, The Easy Chain recalls David Foster Wallace's Infinite Jest (1996): both books offer a jigsaw puzzle of different styles, and construct a remarkably clever and complex plot with many mysteries embedded for the reader to discover after multiple readings. The thematic reach of Dara's novel is also broad. Mapping the emptiness and depression of a consumerist world—“adhedonia” Dara calls it—the novel is deeply informed by the philosophy of mind, ranging from Descartes, through Hans Vaihinger and Karl Lashley, to Daniel Dennett."
- After saying that it's "a mess of a novel," Scott Esposito commends it in the Review of Contemporary Fiction as "the kind of mess Jackson Pollock would have been proud to make." Esposito writes, "Throughout, Dara's fresh language continually turns up gems: in his all-too-accurate vision of America, art's "sovereign goal" is (to update Pound) "make it news," our "economonoculture" leaves us to open invasive forms of finance, "psychoacoustic maladies" are on the rise, and, indeed, the miracle of America's economy is based on our inbred capacity for "arriving at the most expedient error." Although we've had to wait a decade and a half for this follow-up to the equally inventive The Lost Scrapbook, it's good to know that writers like Dara exist, capable of bravely carrying the flame of American postmodernism bequeathed by Pynchon et al."
- The most extensive critique came from Tom LeClair, writing in Bookforum, who found the first half of the novel to be "a pitch-perfect satire of what a character calls 'promosexuals,' young moneyed urbanites who get an erotic charge from promoting themselves at the daily round of receptions promoting products and companies." However, LeClair felt that the second half was not as tight as it needed to be.
- In his review of the novel, Emmett Stinson noted that while David Foster Wallace was often called "strikingly original," he felt that he wasn't unique when it came to writing "experimental novels of exceptional merit," with Evan Dara cited as the best among the excellent but underrated U.S. writers who haven't gotten the same kind of press as Wallace. Stinson concludes by saying, "Simply put, Evan Dara's The Easy Chain is without a doubt, my favourite book that I’ve read in 2011, and in my (not very) humble opinion, Dara is the best-kept secret in all of contemporary American literature today. His highly conceptual but beautifully written novels compare favourably to the best work of William Gaddis (who also gets a passing mention in The Pale King), and I'd argue that readers who enjoys Wallace's work would be doing themselves a disservice not to read Dara's work."

The Spanish translation, La cadena fácil, has actually received more critical attention than the original work:

- In Détour, the reviewer summarizes the novel as a "ruthless portrait of the business world, an expression of melancholy for lost family connections, an essay on all the ways we falsify personal success, plus a reflection on epistemology, truth, lies and our world's last moments of authenticity."
- In Jot Down, Rebeca García Nieto paints a picture of Dara's narrative labyrinth, where characters like Lincoln Selwyn wander, ghost-like, through a world where authenticity is the currency of the lost. It delves into the murky waters of societal 'prostitution', where every soul is a salesman, and every relationship a transaction. The themes of identity dissolution, the superficiality of modern connections, and the relentless march of consumerism are dissected. "If [Dara's] first novel, The Lost Scrapbook, was equal in ambition to Pynchon's V, and equal in quality to William Gaddis, here Dara raises the ante (and the bar) still higher."
- In Diario16, Natalio Blanco addresses the enigmatic allure of Evan Dara, likened to literary giants such as Pynchon, Gaddis, and David Foster Wallace. He sees the novel as a thick tapestry of truth and lies, authenticity and deceit, creativity and imitation. He notes the unique structure of the narrative, with the first half recounted by Lincoln's acquaintances and a 'swirl' structure that includes numerous blank pages, adding to the intrigue and perplexity. "Yes, The Easy Chain is demanding, but it is not inaccessible."
