= Women and Men =

1987 postmodern novel by Joseph McElroy

- First trade edition cover
- Author: Joseph McElroy
- Cover artist: Carin Goldberg
- Language: English
- Genre: Postmodern literature
- Published: April 7, 1987 (Knopf)
- Publication place: United States
- Media type: Print (hardback)
- Pages: 1192
- ISBN: 978-0-394-50344-8

Women and Men is Joseph McElroy's sixth novel. Published in 1987 (with a 1986 copyright), it is 1192 pages long. Somewhat notably, because of its size, the uncorrected proof was issued in two volumes. (Note: A fact some reviewers thought worth mentioning.)

The size and complexity of the novel have led it to be compared with Ulysses, The Recognitions, and Gravity's Rainbow.

== Editions ==
There were two first editions—neither dates itself before the other. In April 1987, (Note: According to the 2nd printing) the first trade edition was published by Knopf. Ultramarine Press published a limited, numbered, signed edition, consisting of the Knopf edition (including its copyright and title page) rebound in leather. One month later, Knopf issued a second printing, with an expanded copyright/acknowledgements page.

In 1993, a paperback edition was published by Dalkey Archive Press. Dalkey usually asked for a permanent license, but were granted only a 10-year one. When it expired expired, the author and his agent decided to have the rights restored to them so that they could try another publisher.

Dzanc Books published a third edition in 2018 in both paperback and ebook. Dzanc also prepared a fourth limited special printing as a two-volume clothbound hardcover, released in 2021.They have announced a new hardcover edition for January 2027.

As of December 2025, the only existing translation of the novel is an Italian version by Andrew Tanzi, published by Il Saggiatore in 2021.

== Organization ==
The novel is divided into three kinds of chapters. The chapters with all lowercase titles are, in essence, independent short stories about characters in the novel, so can be read and appreciated separately from the rest of the novel. Most were published as short stories, with two of them being anthologized in "best of the year" short story collections. Stylistically, they are some of the most accessible fictions McElroy has written.

Sections with titles in all-caps that include the word "BREATHER" in the title are narrated in a first-person plural, by a collective of so-called "angels". They are speaking in the second-person to their interrogator/torturer, whose identity changes, as if the interrogators/torturers were clocking in and out for their job. They tell of a future time when a certain naturally found alloy turns out to have special teleportation powers, and is used to send two people out to the Earth-Moon libration points, where they become merged (without prior knowledge) into one. Stylistically, they are quite difficult, with tense and point of view and topic not always clear. (Note: Gold (1987) suggested that the "you" being tortured might literally be the reader.) In the words of Frederick Karl, the breathers "are attempts to break away from historical narrative into simultaneity."

Sections in all-caps that do not include the word "BREATHER" and those with titles in normal title-case are mostly straightforward narrations, but they are intricately plotted and intimately related to the more difficult portions.

== Plot summary ==
The novel, nominally set in 1976–77, but with long passages set in 1893–4, 1945, 1960–2, and 1973, centers around the life, the partly mythic ancestry, and the partly science fictional future of James Mayn, a business and technology journalist. He lives in the same Murray Hill building as one Grace Kimball. Grace has numerous close ties with just about everyone Jim knows in the novel. These ties include the ordinary, day-to-day interactions with people who know Jim and Grace, and the extraordinary, as Grace's dreams closely parallel the mythic version of Jim's grandmother's life. Jim and Grace "never quite meet", although Jim goes so far as to knock on Grace's door but then changes his mind.

There is a MacGuffin in the guise of a never-performed opera Hamletin based on Hamlet by a Chilean woman, the mother of the zoologist Mena. The opera apparently has magical powers, anathema to fascists and dictators. (Note: p. 1190) A production in a former warehouse on the Upper West Side is in rehearsals.

What follows is a version of the events in the novel arranged in a timeline. Large portions of the story are told in a "spiral" style, with a little bit told at first, then repeated with a little bit more, and so on. Often, multiple plotlines are advanced nearly simultaneously, in long rushing sentences that refer to minor details across the decades and centuries. As an example, some important characters go without a name until very late in the novel.

=== 1834–1837 ===
Marion Hugh Mayne founds the Windrow Democrat as an advocacy newspaper for Andrew Jackson, and writes a diary. He knows Morgan, an Alsatian mathematician.

Samuel Colt opens his first factory in Paterson. The factory fails.

=== 1846–1848 ===
Inspired by the Mexican War, Samuel Colt opens his second factory in Hartford. One of the pistols has a (double) life of its own. (Note: p. 178)

=== 1885 ===
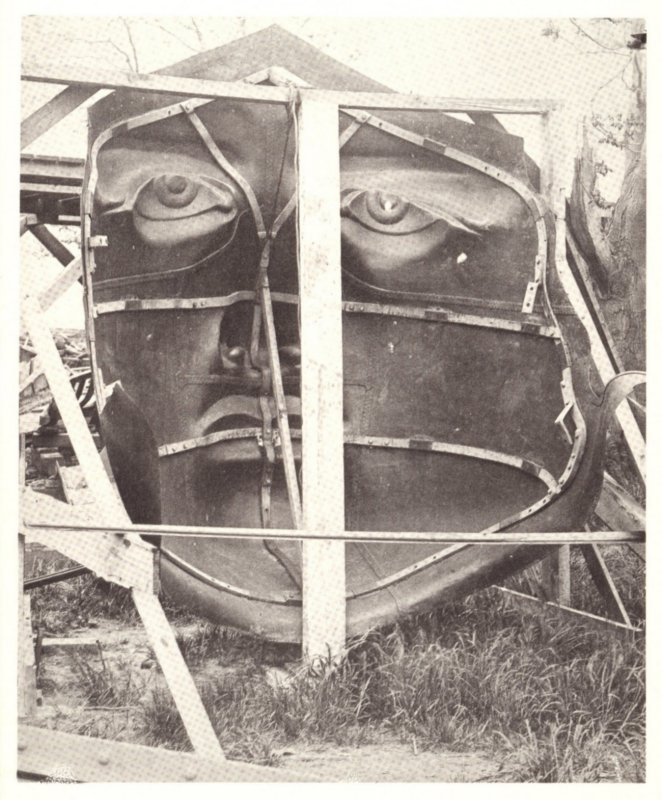
The Statue of Liberty's face from inside

The Statue of Liberty arrives in the U.S. at Bedloe's Island and the pieces are uncrated. Margaret, aged 12, is on the island, looking at the inside of the face, when the Hermit-Inventor tells her to go west.

=== 1893–1894 ===
During the 1880s and the early 1890s the "double Moon" was visible in the Four Corners region, especially after a green flash. After one such flash, the last Anasazi sees the Moon double. A pistol that traces back to Colt's original factory casts two shadows, and the Anasazi admitted to uncertainty of which of two stories is the correct one regarding the pistol's provenance.

The American Marcus Jones, studying locoweed, meets the Chilean Mena, studying the javelina (also called "peccary" or "wild pig") migrating up from the Southern Hemisphere. She sees him casting a doubled shadow from the Moon as he gets off his bicycle. Jones publishes his first article on locoweed classification "Guide to Western Biology" (Note: pp. 539–543)

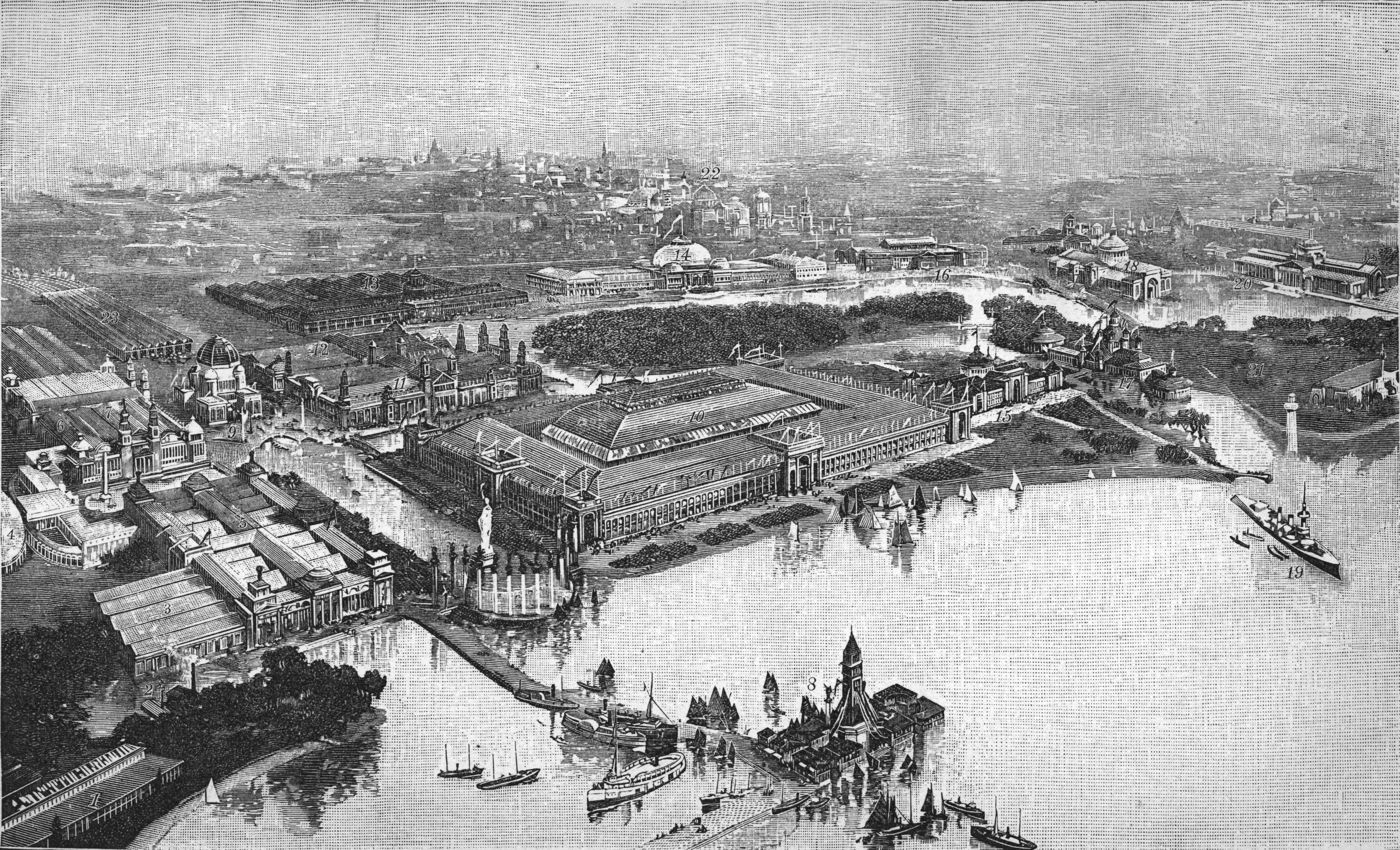
1893 Chicago World's Fair, 1893, aerial view

Margaret goes west with Florence, fellow Windrow girl, to the Chicago World's Fair, reporting for the family newspaper. After the Fair, they traveled together, but when visiting a slaughterhouse, Florence got sick and returned home, while Margaret continued to tour the West, including Colorado, Arizona and New Mexico. (Note: pp. 254–6)

Margaret returns, partly with Coxey's Army, with Alexander (not yet engaged to her) looking for her in the Army.

=== 1914 ===
Margaret spends three nights in jail for Mary Richardson. (Note: p. 903)

=== 1925 ===
Sarah is in France.

=== 1930–1933 ===
Jim is born, 1930. Sarah has an affair with Bob Yard. Brad is born, 1933, presumed to be the son of Yard.

=== 1945 ===
The Hermit-Inventor of New York shows up at a beach where Sarah is with Jim, Brad, and the Yards. The playing between Jim and Brad gets out of hand, and Jim at one point tries to stomp hard on Brad, helplessly lying down in the sand. But Jim suddenly finds himself frozen, stuck at an impossible "extragravitational" angle, giving Brad time to get away.

Sarah disappears, presumed a suicide, off the same beach where a rogue U-boat waits off-shore. On the submarine is the composer of Hamletin, a great-niece of Mena. (Note: p. 1097)

Jim—who hasn't even tried to practice driving yet—steals Yard's pickup truck one evening. He gives up when he discovers T.W. was in the bed.

Brad's Day: Brad has a breakdown in the music room. (Note: pp. 556–565)

Pearl Myles, Jim's journalist teacher, assigns the class "an imaginary news story". (Note: p. 547) Jim hitches a ride to the fatal beach.

=== 1960–1963 ===
Francis Gary Powers and the U-2 he was piloting is shot down over Soviet airspace. The Eisenhower administration says the U-2 was merely a weather research plane. Jim finds himself strongly interested in meteorology as a result.

Jim tells Mayga of his visions of the future. She is abruptly called back to Chile. Jim learns from Ted that she dies in a fall while walking with her husband and paper magnate Morgen. (Note: pp. 429–30) She is presumed to have been murdered. The Hamlet score was recovered from her body.

=== 1972–1973 ===
Jim and Spence are at the December 1972 night launch of Apollo 17. Jim sees Spence talk with the Chilean McKenna, who later talks to Jim about his "economical prisoner" (George Foley) who has a theory of the Colloidal Unconscious.

Jim meets Jean at the May 1973 Skylab launch. (Note: p. 61ff)

=== 1975 ===
Ted is diagnosed with a terminal disease. (Note: p. 393, pp.1054–8)

=== 1976–1977 ===
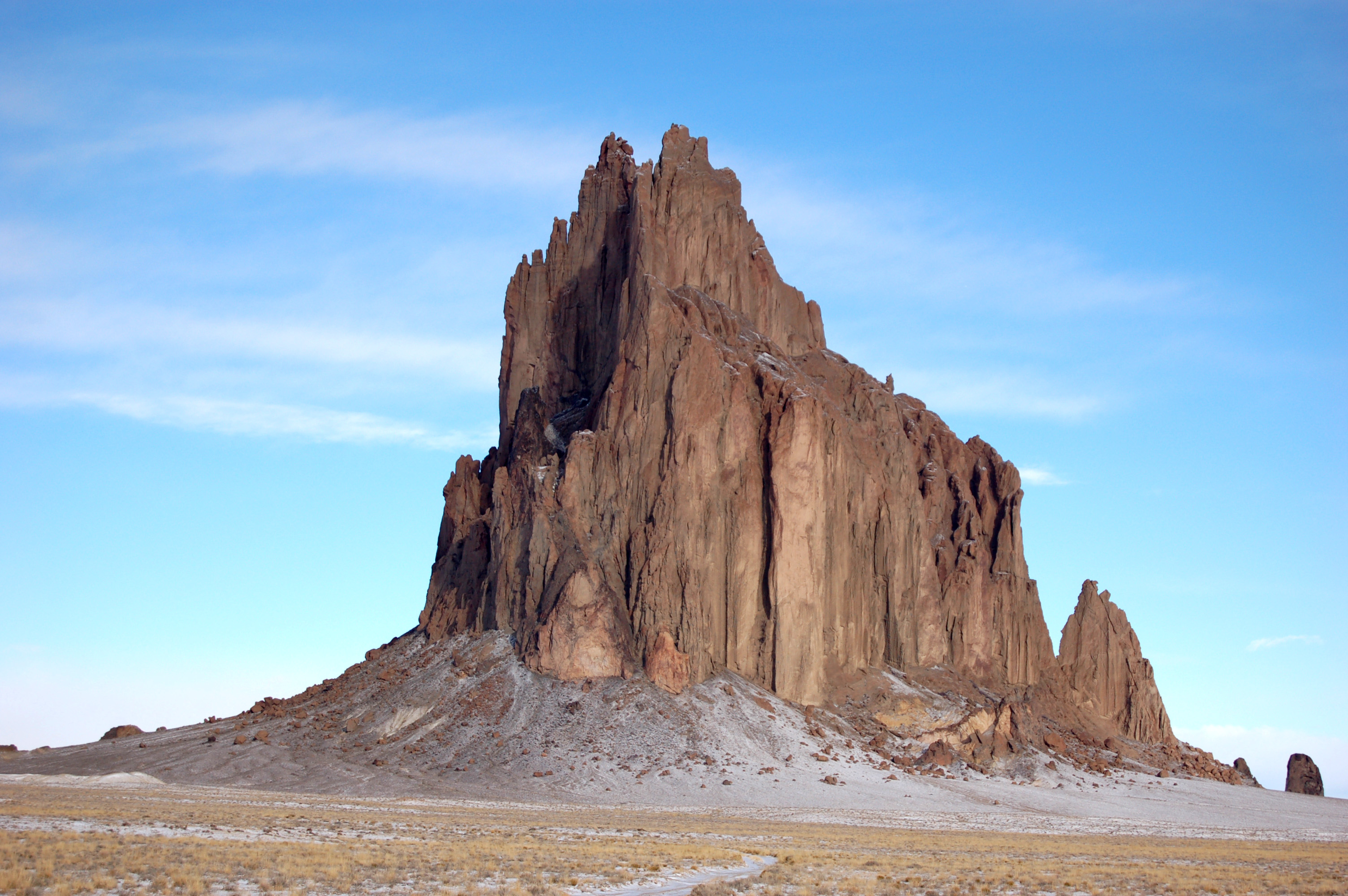
Ship Rock

Jim visits near Ship Rock, to report on mining/energy. He meets Dina West, an Albuquerque-based environmentalist, and Ray Vigil, a Navajo supporter of local geothermal energy, which Jim explains is impossible. (Note: pp. 198–215) Jim sends a message entitled "The Future" to Flick. (Note: p. 182)

Jim tells Jean of his visions of the future, going back to the 1940s. Jean is doubtful, suggesting the idea of torus-shaped space stations hadn't yet made it into the science fiction magazines of his youth. (Note: pp. 1114–17)

Larry attends college.

George Foley smuggles his story out of prison.

Independent Messenger Unit set up, and delivers the Hamlet-based libretto.

Jim has the Safe Bomb dream. (Note: pp. 1157–67)

T.W. is killed, giving his name as Thomas Winwooley. (Note: pp. 1098–1102)

The Hamletin dress rehearsal is performed, with McKenna, Clara, de Talca, Mayn, Jean, Grace, Maureen in attendance. (Note: pp. 1170–7)

== Character summary ==
James "Jim" Mayn was born in 1930 and raised in the fictional city of Windrow, New Jersey. His father Mel was owner and editor of The Windrow Democrat. His mother Sarah was a distant relative of Mel, from the "Mayne" branch, which had owned the paper before Mel, going back to its founding as an advocacy paper for Andrew Jackson and the Bank War. Sarah had an affair with neighbor Bob Yard, who is apparently the father of Brad, Jim's younger brother. Sarah disappeared after visiting the shore, leaving a suicide note, in the summer of 1945.

Jim never dreams, until near the end of the novel, when he has a dream of the "Safe Bomb", which destroys property without harming people. Jim is aware of being in the future, and of using the two-become-one teleportation.

Sarah's parents were Alexander and Margaret Mayne. Margaret, as a young girl in 1885, was told to "go west" by the Hermit-Inventor of New York. She did so in 1893, reporting for her uncle on the Chicago World's Fair. Touring the West, she returns, reporting on Jacob Coxey as she passes through Pennsylvania. She meets Jack London taking part in Coxey's Army. Based on her reports, Alexander goes looking for Margaret.

The Hermit-Inventor of New York reappears, apparently every other generation, as the "nephew" of his previous self. His meeting with Sarah in 1945 precipitated her disappearance.

Jim married Joy, later divorced. Their two children are Andrew, who is estranged from Jim, and Sarah, usually called "Flick". Jim had an affair, early in the marriage, with Chilean journalist Mayga Rodriguez. Mayga had to return suddenly with her husband to Chile. She died shortly afterwards, from a suspicious fall off cliffs in Valparaíso.

Jim is frequently shadowed by Ray Spence, also known as Ray Santee or Santee Sioux. Ray is at first an irritant to Jim, a smarmy journalist who usually just passes off press releases as news and who likes using information he unearths for personal gain. Later, he seems to develop into an outright nemesis, a possible danger to Jim. But in a face-to-face confrontation, Ray suddenly seems to be a sort of ally and perhaps a previously unknown brother to Jim.

A Chilean economist named Mackenna, with his wife Clara, lives in fear of assassination. He is spied upon by Talca (or "de Talca"), an admiral in the Chilean navy and covertly a member of DINA, the Chilean secret police under Pinochet. Talca has an ongoing affair with Luisa, a Chilean-born Swiss-passport opera diva. Luisa hopes Talca can provide leniency for her father, under house arrest in Chile.

Luisa relies on the "tapeworm diet".

In Jim's building live Larry Shearson, a college freshman, with his father Marv. They have recently separated from Larry's mother Susan who, influenced by Grace, has declared she is a lesbian. Larry is sweet on Amy, a recent college graduate who works as Mackenna's assistant. A portion of Larry's freshman economics lecture is given, complete with four graphs and some formulas. Larry's friend Donald "D. D." Dooley uses class time to challenge the professor on the role of classical economics in the contemporary world. Larry has developed theories of "obstacle geometry" and "simultaneous reincarnation".

== Separate excerpts ==
Numerous chapters and excerpts appeared during the ten years it took McElroy to write the novel. The first edition, first printing, referred to these excerpts as "poems", McElroy's own term, and mentioned some of the journals where they had appeared. The second printing more neutrally referred to them as "parts," and gave the complete list of literary journals, in addition to mention of the separate publication of the Ship Rock chapter in a limited edition.

Two intended excerpts were dropped from the final novel, and have been republished in 2010 and 2011. A third intended excerpt was never completed. It was eventually rewritten and published in 2006.

=== List of excerpts ===
- Rent, TriQuarterly 40 (Fall 1977)
- Charity, Mississippi Review 7.2 (Spring 1978)
- Larry, TriQuarterly 42 (Spring 1978)
- The Sound, Fiction 5.2/3 (1978)
- Ship Rock: A Place, published by Ewert, Concord, NH (1980)
- The Unknown Saved, Antaeus 38 (Summer 1980)
- Division of Labor Unknown, Fiction 6.2 (1980)
- The Future, The New Yorker (12/22/1980)
  - reprinted in The Best American Short Stories: 1981 and in Prize Stories 1982: The O. Henry Awards (2nd place)
- The Departed Tenant, The New Yorker (11/23/1981)
- Still Life: Sisters Sharing Information, TriQuarterly 53 (Winter 1982)
- A People Oriented Bomb of Late America, Grand Street 2.1 (Autumn 1982)
- The Message for What It Was Worth, Antaeus 48 (Winter 1983)
- Daughter of the Revolution, Antaeus 52 (Spring 1984)
  - reprinted in Prize Stories 1982: The O. Henry Awards
- From Women and Men, Conjunctions 6 (1984)
  - selected passages from the chapter "The Hermit-Inventor of New York, the Anasazi Healer, and the Unknown Aborter"
  - an author note says that these passages (unlike previous excerpts) are not standalone, and their style is more like the rest of Women and Men than previous excerpts

=== List of dropped excerpts ===
- The Unknown Kid, TriQuarterly 51 (Spring 1981), reprinted in Night Soul and Other Stories, 2011.
- Preparations for Search, Formations 1.1 (1984), reprinted as a separate chapbook, 2010.
- The Last Disarmament But One, Golden Handcuffs Review 1.7 (2006), reprinted in Night Soul and Other Stories, 2011.

== Sources ==
In a 1979 Chicago Review interview (republished in expanded form in Anything Can Happen), writer Tom LeClair wrote that McElroy acknowledged rereading, intimating he was influenced by, Marx, Keynes, Schumacher, and Veblen while writing Women and Men. In the published book, first edition, second printing, the author acknowledges that he "meditated" on E. F. Schumacher's Small Is Beautiful: A Study of Economics As If People Mattered, especially the phrase "an articulated structure that can cope with a multiplicity of small-scale units", which is echoed repeatedly throughout the novel.

== Reception ==
In this extraordinary, multilayered novel of crisis and yearning, Joseph McElroy illuminates with tenderness male and female union and apartness. The high water mark of a distinguished career--a powerful achievement.

— Walter Abish, dust jacket

I was filled with awe and wonder as the immense, epic design of the novel continued to mushroom ever higher...this book is a humbling experience. ... Women and Men is baffling much of the time, but I couldn't help feeling while reading the first Breather section that this is what fiction in the twenty-first century might look like...one closes this extraordinary novel with the conviction that McElroy is fifty years ahead of anyone else now writing.

— Steven Moore, The Review of Contemporary Fiction

Women and Men belongs to the maximalist subspecies of postmodern novel.

— Garth Risk Hallberg, "The lost postmodernist: Joseph McElroy", Los Angeles Times

For me, by the close, it was like having listened for several days to an all-news station in a foreign language: you have a rough idea of what's been going on, the news is worse than you imagine, and, while you feel more or less informed, you can't really say that you've enjoyed yourself. But one does not go to this novelist for the usual pleasures.

— Ivan Gold, New York Times
