= A Smuggler's Bible =

1966 novel by Joseph McElroy

- Cover of the 1st edition
- Author: Joseph McElroy
- Language: English
- Genre: Post-modern fiction
- Published: 1966 (Harcourt, Brace & World)
- Media type: Print (Hardback)
- Pages: 368
- ISBN: 978-0-233-95976-4

A Smuggler's Bible is Joseph McElroy's first novel. David Brooke—who talks of himself in a split-personality manner—narrates a framing tale that consists of him "smuggling" his essence into eight autobiographical manuscripts, although their connection with Brooke is not always clear. Brooke seems to deteriorate, while his fictions become more real.

The term "smuggler's bible" refers to a book with a cutout in the body of the pages, suitable for hiding small items when the covers are closed.

== Plot summary ==
The novel consists of a frame story (summarized here indented), intercut with eight chapters that are the eight manuscripts mentioned in the frame story.

the principal parts of david brooke

The frame story is told from what seems to be a split-personality part of a consciousness, although it may simply be an extended metaphor for the mind of an author, keeping distinct his personal life and creative mental life:

He doesn't know what I am, but he knows I'm in him and behind him. His name is David Brooke....[H]e senses that I—I—am his propulsion....I inhabit him.

David is on a cruise ship heading to London. He has eight manuscripts, his memories, and they need to be made into one. An older Englishman approaches David, talks about smuggling, how it used to be a fine art, but now the current generation are mere amateurs. He gives David his card. David returns to the stateroom, and begins editing the first manuscript. He then rereads the manuscript, at which point the frame story stops and the text becomes that of the first manuscript.

=== The Shadow ===
Forty-two-year-old Peter St. John runs an antiquarian bookstore in Brooklyn Heights. His father Hugh lives in London, his wife Sally and daughter Joan are staying in Maine for the summer. His friend David Brooke, aged 28, living in his parents' house, sometimes hangs around the store. He sometimes steals books, with St. John's knowledge.

Walter Roy, a boy, has been stalking St. John from a distance. After a few times, St. John confronts Walt, and learns that, from a distance, Walt had thought St. John resembled Walt's father, William, who had been a 41-year-old stockbroker when he died the previous April. St. John ends up wanting to be fatherly to Walt, and give him a gift of an atlas, but Walt rebels against the idea and the gift.

the blue address book

The frame story resumes with David thinking about his earlier belief in solipsism from reading half an essay in the St. John store. But a week later, thinking about his mother's blue address book, and how it contained so many names he did not know, he concluded that such a thing was beyond him. Unable to find the rest of the essay, he continued to think about the issue, and this motivated him to write the eight manuscripts: "After The Shadow David had to project himself into a community." David's thoughts expand to include Lamont Cranston, The Shadow, with the power to cloud men's minds.

While David's wife Ellen plays chess with the man interested in smuggling, David edits his second manuscript.

=== A Cabinet of Coins ===
This manuscript consists of first person accounts by Mary Clovis, James Judah Lafayette, Abby Love, and Alonzo Morganstern, all residents on the same floor of the Kodak Hotel, now a boarding house. They share the floor with David Brooke, and one Luke Pennitt. There is also an account from Terri, the maid. Theodore Selbstein is their landlord.

From Mrs. Clovis we learn that Pennitt has a coin collection, is very secretive, and does not want maid service, that Morganstern is a Communist, that Pennitt and Morganstern constantly argue, that Brooke has gone from quiet to noisy under Morganstern's influence, and that Pennitt is behind in his rent.

Lafayette (originally Lamentoff) overhears Brooke talking with some girl. She's interested in him, but he's worried about Pennitt and his coins. She's also behind in her rent, and Brooke is willing to pay it.

Terri would like to marry one Franklin Benjamin, who, it turns out, knows Brooke and questions Terri about him. Selbstein has her check Pennitt's room for anything interesting. Eventually she finds an odd machine in his closet, with screw-rods and other things she can't figure out, but her description satisfies Selbstein's curiosity.

The girl with Brooke turns out to be Abby Love. She describes in great detail Brooke's conversations with Pennitt on coins. She has a big fight with Brooke, writes him an IOU for back rent, and leaves him for at least a day.

Morganstern lies to Brooke about being a former pro boxer. He admits to having to move around a lot. Selbstein tells him that Pennitt is being evicted for nonpayment and that Love has never missed a rent check.

That chapter ends with a section of pure dialogue, as Selbstein is evicting Pennitt. It turns out that Pennitt's coin collection was manufactured by Pennitt using the odd machine in his closet.

blind john jones and the ice-cream sculpture

After the narrator mocks David, David returns to his third manuscript, which we learn is about his sister Ann's baby sent home from England.

The narrator talks on about John Jones, the blind man of the Heights who sometimes entertained young David with a ventriloquism act.

David overhears the smuggler-man outside his stateroom asking a steward to leave a note for David. David reviews the history of Eloy Mestrelle who introduced coining by mill and screw. He gets the note, which is an invitation for further conversation about smuggling, offering to show David a "true collector's item."

=== Cable ===
David's mother Julia, 60, is reading a cablegram telling of the time of arrival that afternoon of her seven-week-old granddaughter Julie at Idlewild, giving time but not the flight, while her daughter Ann and son-in-law Dan stay in London sightseeing, headed to Israel. Her husband, Halsey, 65, is in Chicago, and will be taking a train back to New York. David himself, now 31, is in New Hampshire, having moved there eighteen months previously.

That night Julia gives a dinner, with guests Bobby Prynne, a friend of David, headed for a divorce and sweet on Julia in a way she finds creepy, friends Quincey and Sarah Fearon, and after they leave, her distant younger cousin Josie Wrenn shows up.

The next morning, Julia meets Halsey at Penn Station, much to his surprise.

reflex therapy, or what bruder didn't say

The narrator David gives David a dream, where David is split into David A, who experiences the dream, and David B, who interprets the dream. Halsey is also in the dream. The main action is forced to occur eight times. The last time is going poorly, so the narrator wakes David up.

There follows an interview/session of David with Dr. Bruder from some unspecified time and place.

Back on ship, David overhears the smuggler and the scientist talk outside his stateroom, mentioning him. David gets back to working on manuscript four concerning the Amerchromes, pondering Dr. Bruder's advice. David handles the seven-level screwdriver, to the narrator's objection, that David had stolen from Michael Amerchrome. Upon hearing Ellen show up, David pockets the screwdriver.

=== An American Hero, or the Last Days of Duke, Mary, and Me ===
Michael Amerchrome narrates in first person about himself, his "famous historian" father Duke, 54, and his stepmother, Mary, 35, Duke's third wife. Michael presumes the second wife was his mother, of whom he has no memories. Duke's past includes an eclectic list of job titles, but Michael admits he knows nothing beyond the titles. As an example, he mentions Duke's work acting in and directing a documentary, but which Duke does not let Michael see. The family frequently moves.

Duke is currently in his second year as a professor at a young New Hampshire university.

suicide in a camel's hair coat

=== Anglo-American Chronicle ===
the canal street hypnotist

=== Ice Cream, Invertito, Cemetery by the Sea ===
the black box

=== Symptoms of Fugue, or How David in a Sense Faked Amnesia, and What Happened ===
integration and the man upstairs

== Reception ==
In this immensely interesting but bafflingly fragmented first novel, Joseph McElroy sets before the reader a truly impressive display of masterly craftsmanship and recondite virtuosity. ... This is a strange but compelling novel.

— ?, Kirkus Reviews

One must ... pay high tribute to McElroy's daring, range and brilliant subtlety. [It] is a remarkable novel... To ignore it would be as shameful an act of blind self-deprivation as that which so many of us performed when The Recognitions and Under the Volcano were first published.

— J. R. Frakes, The New York Times Book Review

McElroy has every gift that can blandish us into being entertained: dialogue, characterization, topography, wit... [T]his steeplechase of a novel [takes] all the jumps with a style none of his contemporaries has equalled

— Richard Howard, The New Leader

== Influences ==
McElroy explicitly acknowledged the influence of William Gaddis The Recognitions in an interview, and also in his "Neural Neighborhoods" essay, where McElroy states he was already well into his own novel when he read the Gaddis novel.

One McElroy passage makes a rather direct allusion:

I tried to go on with a one-thousand-page novel I was reading, ... "Giorgio examined his nails, not, as men do, fingers in against the palms, but rather in the manner of women, the whole long irregular oval of the back of the hand beautiful and banked."

which is closely similar to a passage in The Recognitions:

[Otto] thought to look at his fingernails. Not as a man does, the fingers turned in upon the palms, but like a lady, at the back of the extended hand so that she may admire the slim beauty of her fingers.

Professor Duke Amerchrome is an academic fraud, an addition to the catalog of quacks, counterfeiters, and art forgers in the Gaddis novel.

Moreover, Reverend Gwyon hides his liquor in a smuggler's bible (although Gaddis does not use that term).
