= Joseph McElroy =

American postmodernist writer

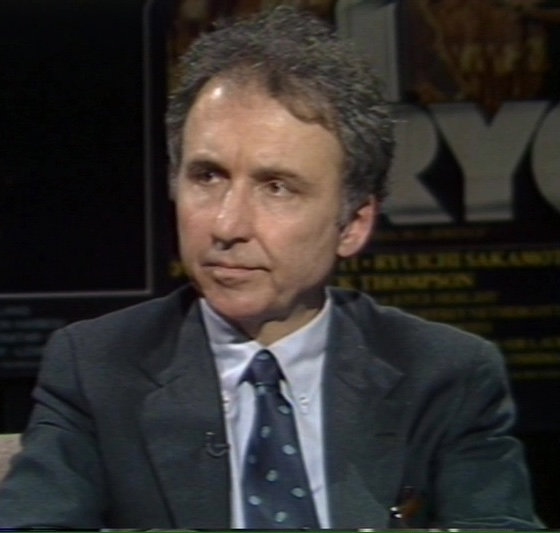
- McElroy on CUNY TV's Cinema Then, Cinema Now (1988)
- Born: August 21, 1930 (age 96); New York City, U.S.
- Education: Poly Prep; Williams College; Columbia University (PhD)
- Occupations: Novelist, professor
- Writing career
- Notable works: Lookout Cartridge, Women and Men
- Movement: Postmodern
- Website: josephmcelroy.com

Joseph Prince McElroy (born August 21, 1930) is an American novelist, short story writer, and essayist. He is noted for his long postmodern novels such as Women and Men.

== Personal background ==
McElroy was born on August 21, 1930, in Brooklyn, New York, and grew up in Brooklyn Heights. He graduated from Poly Prep Country Day School in 1947 and was given an Alumni Distinguished Achievement Award in 2007 from the school's Board of Governors. He graduated from Williams College in 1951. The following year, McElroy earned a master's degree from Columbia University. He served in the Coast Guard from 1952 to 1954, and then returned to Columbia to complete his Ph.D. in 1961.

In 1961, McElroy married Joan Leftwich, of London, in London. She is the daughter of Yiddish-speaking Orthodox Jews; her father, Joseph Leftwich, was a translator and anthologizer of Yiddish poetry. They have a daughter.

== Career ==
McElroy taught English and creative writing at the University of New Hampshire from 1956 to 1962 and at Queens College, City University of New York from 1964 to 1995, when he retired. McElroy's first novel, A Smuggler's Bible, was published in 1966. McElroy said A Smuggler's Bible "is like everybody's first novel, trying to put too much between covers. ... [I]t's a young book, and young people still seem to like it."

McElroy's writing is often grouped with that of William Gaddis and Thomas Pynchon, due to the encyclopedic quality of his novels, especially Women and Men (1987). His short fiction was first published in literary journals. Echoes of McElroy's work can be found in that of Don DeLillo and David Foster Wallace. McElroy's work often reflects a preoccupation with how science functions in American society; Exponential, a collection of essays published in Italy in 2003, collects science and technology journalism written primarily in the 1970s and 1980s for the New York Review of Books.

In 1980, McElroy and his class at Queens College interviewed Norman Mailer. He interviewed Harry Mathews in 2002 for the Village Voice. McElroy wrote about his fiction and influences in his essay "Neural Neighborhoods".

== Honors and awards ==
- John Simon Guggenheim Memorial Foundation Fellowship, Fiction, 1976
- American Academy of Arts and Letters Award in Literature, 1977
- Rockefeller Foundation Fellowship
- Ingram Merrill Foundation Fellowship, twice
- National Endowment for the Arts Fellowship, twice

== Published works ==
=== Novels ===
- A Smuggler's Bible, Harcourt Brace, 368 pages, 1966. ISBN 978-0233959764
- Hind's Kidnap: A Pastoral on Familiar Airs, Harper and Row, 534 pages, 1969. ISBN 978-0893661052
- Ancient History: A Paraphase, Knopf, 307 pages, 1971. ISBN 978-0394469256
- Lookout Cartridge, Knopf, 531 pages, 1974. ISBN 978-0394493756
- Plus, Knopf, 215 pages, 1977. ISBN 978-0394407944
- Women and Men, Knopf, 1192 pages, 1987. ISBN 978-0394503448
- The Letter Left to Me, Knopf, 151 pages, 1988. ISBN 978-0394571966
- Actress in the House, Overlook, 432 pages, 2003. ISBN 978-1585673506
- Cannonball, Dzanc Books, 312 pages, 2013. ISBN 978-1938604218

=== Short stories ===
- The Accident, New American Review, Number 2, January 1968.
- Ship Rock: A Place, William B. Ewert, Concord, New Hampshire, limited edition, 42 pages, 1980
  - republished as a chapter in Women and Men, 1987
- Preparations for Search 1984
  - revised and printed as a chapbook, by Small Anchor Press, 2010
- Night Soul and Other Stories, Dalkey Archive Press, 304 pages, 2011. ISBN 978-1564786029
- Taken From Him, Kindle Singles, 2014.
- "Court of Last Opinion". Fiction. No. 61. Fiction, Inc. 2015.

=== Essays ===
- Exponential (2003; published in Italy)
- "Neural Neighborhoods and Other Concrete Abstracts" (1974)
