= Flee (novel) =

- Author: Evan Dara
- Language: English
- Genre: Postmodernism
- Published: 2013
- Publisher: Aurora
- Publication place: United States
- ISBN: 978-0980226621

Flee (2013) is the third novel published by the American writer Evan Dara.

The novel details the strange dissolution of a fictionalized version of Burlington, Vermont, where the residents begin to flee following the closure of the local university, Pitkinson University (which largely resembles the University of Vermont).

In The Times Literary Supplement, Trey Strecker wrote, "In Flee, Dara returns to his most consistent theme: the complex interdependence of ecology and economy, of community and commerce. Flee begins mid-thought: 'Something always going on -'. This 'something' is the flight from Anderburg, Vermont of the bulk of the town's residents, against a backdrop of corporate instability, civic shenanigans and rumours of a mysterious illness."

In a discussion about the book, Edwin Turner declare, "Flee is maybe the best novel (so far, anyway) to aesthetically and philosophically address the economic collapse of '08."
