= Ancient History (novel) =

1971 novel by Joseph McElroy

Ancient History: A Paraphase
- Cover of the 1st edition
- Author: Joseph McElroy
- Cover artist: Muriel Nasser
- Language: English
- Genre: Post-modern fiction
- Published: 1971 (Knopf)
- Media type: Print (Hardback)
- Pages: 307
- ISBN: 978-0-394-46925-6

Ancient History: A Paraphase is Joseph McElroy's third novel, published in 1971. It presents itself as a hastily written essay/memoir/confession. The character Dom is sometimes described as a fictionalized Norman Mailer.

The title "Ancient History" refers to classical Roman, Greek, Egyptian, and Persian history, which Cy, the narrator, is something of an amateur expert in. It was the name for the course Cy took at Poly Prep. But it also the narrator's frequent dismissive phrase regarding his own obsessive retelling of trivial details from his own personal past.

The word "paraphase", used in the subtitle and a few times in the text, is Cy's neologism, never actually defined. In March 2014, Dzanc Books published a paperback edition, with an introduction by Jonathan Lethem.

== Plot summary ==
The setting is one evening, circa 1970.

Cy had intended to talk to the famous social scientist/writer/activist Dom (or Don, Cy isn't sure) who lives in the same Manhattan building as Cy. But upon arriving at Dom's floor of the building, he finds the police are removing Dom's body, reportedly a suicide. Cy enters the apartment, locks the door but leaves the chain off, and proceeds to commit in writing, with Dom's own paper and pen, all the things Cy had intended to say to Dom, and then some. The resulting manuscript is the sole content of the novel.

Cy tells the rambling story of his own life, his friendships since childhood with Al (on vacations in the country) and with Bob (his neighbor in Brooklyn Heights), his marriage to Ev and their daughter Emma, her ex-husband Doug, later a suicide which Cy feels partly responsible for, his stepson Ted. He makes a major issue of the fact that Al and Bob have never met by his own connivance, but are about to. He confesses to stealing Dom's mail. He also writes a great deal about Dom's life and theories, and expresses concern that Dom's suicide might be Cy's fault.

Halfway through, the narrative breaks off mid-sentence. As we learn in the resumption of Cy's writing, Dom's son-in-law and a police officer entered the apartment and looked around. Cy was hidden behind a curtain, but he had left the just-written manuscript on Dom's desk. The officer wasn't sure if he should treat the apartment as a crime scene: he was suspicious of the son-in-law's removal of Cy's manuscript, but let it go. When the two leave, Cy sees that his writing was taken. Cy then resumes his writing, even more frantic.

== Character summary ==
Cy
Presumably short for Cyrus, (Note: Cy wonders what his mother would think of Cyrus the Great's morbid childhood had she ever have had to name a second child.) also called C.C. Born around 1930, an only child, an early gift of a Junior Corona leads to Cy taking an interest in writing. Cy attended Poly. Cy has a strong interest in ancient history, and refers learnedly to Cyrus the Great, Harpagus, Herodotus, Hypatia and Lucretius. He makes erudite puns, like Forgetorix the First and Utmosis the Last. He has followed Dom's career, partly with a press pass, moving into Dom's building six months before Dom's death, and was introduced to Dom by a mutual acquaintance one week before Dom's death. He is married to Ev, whose son by a previous marriage is Ted. Cy and Ev have a daughter Emma, just learning to talk.

Dom
The great man, a New York Jewish liberal, writer, and activist. He led a great demonstration in 1968, the Anti-Abstraction March, which culminated with Dom falling—possibly pushed, not that Dom admits to caring—out of a ninth floor window and surviving unhurt. He is divorced from Dorothy, called "Dot". Their children are Richard and Lila. Lila is married to an unnamed psychiatrist, frequently referred to by his nationality, Hungarian. (Note: Ted was treated for a while by a Hungarian psychiatrist, but Cy gives no indication if this is the same person.)

Al
Cy's country friend, from near Heatsburg, a fictional town in Massachusetts, the far end of Red Sox territory. He has an encyclopedic knowledge of seemingly everything. He served in the Coast Guard from 1951–53. His sister Gail and Cy were attracted to each other as young teenagers. He has a cat named Epaminondas.

Bob
Cy's Brooklyn Heights childhood neighbor and friend. He married Perpetua "Petty" Belle Pound, a mutual childhood friend and neighbor of Bob and Cy. Their children are Robert and John B. He likes Beckett's plays, in contrast to Cy, who likes Beckett's novels. Their Beckett discussion is the first time Cy's name is mentioned.

Doug
Ev's ex-husband, and father of Ted, he committed suicide the day after meeting Cy. The description of the meeting itself, partway though the second half, is the second time Cy mentions his own name.

Fred Eagle
A book-seller, he tries to interest Cy and some friends in Charles Dickens, especially Great Expectations, the famed eleventh edition of the Encyclopædia Britannica, and Charles Kingsley Hypatia. (Note: Not mentioned in the novel is the fact that the main antagonist in Hypatia is another "Cy": Cyril of Alexandria.) He later recounts a dream, where he saw his wife reading Hypatia, but she became Hypatia, and time ancient and present mixed together.

== What is "paraphase"? ==
McElroy has given the following explanation:

Also, there is in the book a very immediate but also abstract field theory that is associated with the ultimate destination of the book labeled in its subtly but correctly spelled subtitle, Paraphase: a new time, or state like time, or state of being outside or beside time (phase meaning “a section of time,” para meaning “beside,” “parallel to,” “substituted for”).

— -, Neural Neighborhoods and Other Concrete Abstracts, 1974

Cy's first use of the word occurs on page 139:

Her husband would think me mad if I told about voices tampering with my door knob but—
For thirty seconds I've heard your door knob being handled; and accompanying the rattle, ten seconds ago: "Son-in-law's comin' awver, he may have a key. Try the super again"—
Now I'm writing again....Into the regular arc of my legible but distinctive hand so many rates of time collapse: a month in a phrase, interruptions to raid the icebox or listen, a Fred-Eagled hour in three long pages, four summers in the one word `quarry,' and now a nearly instant thirty-word response to thirty seconds. Collapse into paraphase.

NYT review with misspelled subtitle.

The "phrases" here refer to Cy's actual writing compared and contrasted with the reality they are describing, three phrases to Cy's personal "ancient history", and two phrases regarding Cy's current situation (although the "thirty word" count seems to be off by one). A reader of Beckett's novels, Cy has adopted a Malone-like style, including comments on his own handwriting.

Not all readers have noticed the unusual spelling. For example, The New York Times review by Lehmann-Haupt gives the subtitle as "Paraphrase", and similarly misspells the word in the above quotation from the novel. (Note: Of course, this may be the fault of a copy-editor.)

== Themes and style ==
The novel is highly repetitious (one analysis calls it "a verbal excess"), with Cy amplifying the various back stories, in ways which emphasize, and sometimes are, the themes. Cy himself is a reader of Samuel Beckett's novels. Because Cy has too much memory (Cy wishes he "could be Forgetorix the First, (Note: a learned "ancient history" pun) and leave behind ... a mass of Past"), Cy is forced into florid repetitiveness. The "connect-the-dot" puzzles that Al's father did are echoed in the characters with names barely more than A, B, C, D, E, F, etc., and which the reader is forced to "connect".

Cy has a taste for "para-" as a prefix, including several uses of the subtitle neologism "paraphase". Cy muses that Dom's "site", now that he is occupying it, has become a "para-site".

"Parabola" is used frequently. It first appears attached to two diagrams from Ted's geometry lessons, one of a parabola showing the curve as the locus of points equidistant from a focus and a directrix, the other as a cross-section of a cone. Later uses, along with "equidistant" and "directrix", are vague and metaphorical.

Cy has a theory concerning what he calls the Vectoral Muscle, located in the brain near the pons Varolii. It is a gift that usually only children might have, allowing them to see the geometric relations between everything. But it can go wrong, leading to Vectoral Dystrophy.

== Reception ==
In the two reviews from the NYT cited below, note that the first review has the incorrect "Paraphrase" in the subtitle, while the second review has the correct "Paraphase".

[T]here is a coherence of development as absorbing as the squarest linear plot, a tension in the seeming randomness that keeps one leaping back and forth in time from scrap of incident to shard of memory as nimbly as an acrobat. Really, try it. ... [It all spins] together to generate an electric field that crackles with the vitality of contemporary American life.

— Christopher Lehmann-Haupt, The New York Times

Conceived with high intelligence, lucidy and wit....

— Stephen Donadio, The New York Times Book Review

Ancient History is really rather like a connect-the-dot puzzle stretched out over 300 pages: and it is to McElroy's credit that the reader wants to find the pattern embedded in all the cleverness and sticks with the novel, encountering along the way some dazzling literary designs and images.

— J. A. Avant, Library Journal
