= Tom LeClair =

Thomas LeClair (born 1944) is a writer, literary critic, and was the Nathaniel Ropes Professor of English at the University of Cincinnati until 2009. He has been a regular book reviewer for the New York Times Book Review, the Washington Post Book World, the Nation, the Barnes & Noble Review, and the Daily Beast.

== Early life ==
LeClair grew up in Vermont, got his AB from Boston College, his MA from the University of Vermont, and his PhD from Duke University. He taught for two years at Norwich College before joining the faculty at the University of Cincinnati in 1970.

== Literary career ==
In 1979, LeClair secured the first interview with Don Delillo, in Athens. LeClair taught at the University of Athens in 1981–82, and since then regularly spent his summers and sabbaticals in Greece.

His works of criticism include In the Loop: Don DeLillo and the Systems Novel, The Art of Excess: Mastery in Contemporary American Fiction, and What to Read (and Not): Essays and Reviews. He is co-editor with Larry McCaffery of Anything Can Happen, a collection of interviews the two co-editors did with contemporary American novelists.

== Bibliography ==
Novels:

- Passing Off (1996)
- Well-Founded Fear (2000)
- Passing On (2004)
- The Liquidators (2006)
- Passing Through (2008)
- Lincoln's Billy (2015)
- Passing Away (2018)
- Passing Again (2021; corrected, expanded edition 2022)

Nonfiction works:

- In the Loop: Don DeLillo and the Systems Novel (1988)
- ANYTHING CAN HAPPEN: Interviews with Contemporary American Novelists (1983) with Larry McCaffery
- The Art of Excess: Mastery in Contemporary American Fiction (1989)
- What to Read and Not (2014)
- Harpooning Donald Trump (2017)
