= Helen and Kurt Wolff Translator's Prize =

Annual translator award by the Goethe Institute

- Awarded for: Outstanding literary translation from German into English
- Description: A literary prize honoring an outstanding literary translation from German into English
- Sponsored by: German Federal Office
- Country: United States
- Presented by: Goethe-Institut New York
- Reward: US$10,000
- Established: 1996
- Website: www.goethe.de/ins/us/en/kul/lue/hkw.html

The Helen and Kurt Wolff Translator's Prize is an annual literary prize named for the German–American publishers Helen and Kurt Wolff "honoring an outstanding literary translation from German into English", published in the United States of America the previous year. The translator of the winning translation receives $10,000.

The prize was established in 1996 and is funded by the German Federal Office. It was managed by the Goethe-Institut Chicago until 2014. Since 2015, the prize has been administered by the Goethe-Institut in New York.

== Awardees ==
Year	Translator	Author	Title	Ref.
1996	John E. Woods	Thomas Mann	The Magic Mountain	
1996	John E. Woods	Arno Schmidt	Nobodaddy's Children	
1997	Leila Vennewitz	Jurek Becker	Jacob the Liar	
1998	John Brownjohn	Thomas Brussig	Heroes Like Us	
1999	Joel Agee	Heinrich von Kleist	Penthesilea	
2000	Michael Hofmann	Joseph Roth	Rebellion	
2001	Krishna Winston	Günter Grass	Too Far Afield	
2002	Anthea Bell	W. G. Sebald	Austerlitz	
2003	Margot Bettauer Dembo	Judith Hermann	Summerhouse, Later	
2004	Breon Mitchell	Uwe Timm	Morenga	
2005	Michael Henry Heim	Thomas Mann	Death in Venice	
2006	Susan Bernofsky	Jenny Erpenbeck	The Old Child & Other Stories	
2007	Peter Constantine	Benjamin Lebert	The Bird is a Raven	
2008	David Dollenmayer	Moses Rosenkranz	Childhood. An Autobiographical Fragment	
2009	John Hargraves	Michael Krüger	The Executor – A Comedy of Letters	
2010	Ross Benjamin	Michael Maar	Speak, Nabokov	
2011	Jean M. Snook	Gert Jonke	The Distant Sound	
2012	Burton Pike	Gerhard Meier	Isle of the Dead	
2013	Philip Boehm	Gregor von Rezzori	An Ermine in Czernopol	
2014	Shelley Frisch	Reiner Stach	Kafka: The Years of Insight	
2015	Catherine Schelbert	Hugo Ball	Flametti, or The Dandyism of the Poor	
2016	Daniel Bowles	Christian Kracht	Imperium	
2017	Charlotte Collins	Robert Seethaler	A Whole Life	
2018	Isabel Fargo Cole	Wolfgang Hilbig	Old Rendering Plant	
2019	Damion Searls	Uwe Johnson	Anniversaries. From the Life of Gesine Cresspahl	
2020	Philip Boehm	Christine Wunnicke	The Fox and Dr. Shimamura	
2021	Jackie Smith	Judith Schalansky	An Inventory of Losses	
2022	Vincent Kling	Heimito von Doderer	The Strudlhof Steps	
2024	Jon Cho-Polizzi	Max Czollek	De-Integrate: A Jewish Survival Guide for the 21st Century	
2025	Paul Reitter	Karl Marx	Capital: Critique of Political Economy, Volume 1	
2026	Max Lawton	Michael Lentz	Schattenfroh	
