= Ice (Sorokin novel) =

Novel by Vladimir Sorokin

- First edition
- Author: Vladimir Sorokin
- Original title: Лёд
- Translator: Jamey Gambrell
- Language: Russian
- Publisher: Ad Marginem
- Publication date: 2002
- Publication place: Russia
- English publication date: 2007
- Pages: 317
- ISBN: 5933210390
- Preceded by: Bro
- Followed by: 23,000

Ice (Russian: «Лёд», romanized: Lyod) is a 2002 novel by the Russian writer Vladimir Sorokin. The story is set in a brutal Russia of the near future, where the Tunguska meteor has provided a mysterious cult with a material which can make people's hearts speak. The book is the first written part of Sorokin's Ice Trilogy, although the second part in the narrative; it was followed by Bro in 2004 and 23,000 in 2006.

== Reception ==
Jon Fasman reviewed the book in the Los Angeles Times, and wrote that it "provides a head-scratching pleasure and deceptive quickness similar to that found in the novels of Haruki Murakami". Fasman continued: "Ice is a thriller in the truest sense: In addition to a swift and sure plot, reading it affords the thrill of discovering something new. Like Michel Houellebecq, Sorokin obsesses over the ways that the needs and decay of the body betray us, even if he lacks that author's haughty, nihilistic French grimness. Murakami writes with more whimsy and a similar feel for the pleasure of a swift, humming plot, but Sorokin is less burdened with nostalgia, less preoccupied with loss and a sense that life is better elsewhere." Ken Kalfus of The New York Times wrote: "In his frigid antihumanism, Sorokin parts company with Russian satirists like Gogol, Bulgakov, Yuri Olesha and, more recently, Viktor Pelevin. Jamey Gambrell, who has produced luminous translations of lyrical contemporary Russian writers like Tatyana Tolstaya, transforms Sorokin's staccato cadences into a hard-boiled English that suits the novel's brutality, especially in its violent early chapters. But even with help from a sensitive translator, American readers taking a whack at the novel with their own ice hammers may have trouble finding its heart, and even more trouble getting it to speak."

== See also ==
- 2002 in literature
- Russian literature
