= 23,000 =

Novel

- Cover Photo
- Author: Vladimir Sorokin
- Translator: Jamey Gambrell
- Language: Russian
- Publisher: Zakharov Books
- Publication date: 2005
- Publication place: Russia
- English publication date: 2011
- Preceded by: Ice (Sorokin novel)

23,000 is a 2005 novel by the Russian writer Vladimir Sorokin. The story is set in a brutal Russia of the near future, where a meteor has provided a mysterious cult with a material which can make people's hearts speak. The book is the final part in Sorokin's Ice Trilogy; it was preceded by Ice from 2002 and Bro from 2004. It first appeared in an omnibus volume with the whole trilogy.

== Reception ==
Boyd Tonkin of The Independent highlighted the book's themes of collapse, and wrote: "Yet somehow this deliberate fictional train-wreck never loses its gobsmacking audacity, or skimps on suspense."

== See also ==
- 2005 in literature
- Russian literature
