= Bro (novel) =

2004 novel by Vladimir Sorokin

- First edition
- Author: Vladimir Sorokin
- Original title: Put' Bro
- Translator: Jamey Gambrell
- Language: Russian
- Series: The Ice Trilogy
- Genre: Science fiction novel
- Publisher: Zakharov (Russian); NYRB Classics (English)
- Publication date: 2004
- Publication place: Russia
- English publication date: 2011
- Media type: Print (hardback and paperback)
- Pages: 230
- ISBN: 978-1-59017-386-2
- Followed by: Ice

Bro is a science fiction novel by Vladimir Sorokin, the first part in the series The Ice Trilogy, a “tripartite extravaganza [that] pummels the reader with super-dense chunks of satire, fantasy, parody, history and paranoid pseudo-theory.“ The other volumes are, respectively, Ice and 23,000. Although it chronologically precedes Ice, it was written several years after Ice was published.

== Plot summary ==
The protagonist is a young boy named Alexander growing up with a well-off family in Ukraine. Around 1918, when he turned 10, the Russian civil war forced him and his family to leave their home in hopes of trying to escape to Warsaw, but they were hit by artillery fire which killed his father, brother, and uncle.

The protagonist ends up living with an aunt in Moscow, and attending college there. His aunt ends up being arrested, at which point the protagonist abandons the apartment they were living in, and has already dropped out of college. The protagonist decides to go on an expedition to find the Tungus meteorite, which happened to strike earth the same day he was born.

During this expedition, the protagonist abandons the group and makes a spiritual connection with the meteorite which he describes as "Ice". The Ice tells the protagonist that he is a member of the brotherhood of the light, his name is Bro, and he must go out into the world and find the rest of 23,000 members.The brotherhood of the light created the universe but made one mistake which was earth. People and animals are disrupting the universe and the 23,000 want to come together to destroy the earth and restore order to the universe. The protagonist immediately sets out to accomplish this goal.

== Characters ==
Bro - The protagonist of the story. Originally named Alexander Snegirev, he was born June 30, 1908, the same day that the meteor reached the Earth. During his childhood, he develops a fascination with astronomy and, after dropping out of college, is given an opportunity to search for the meteor that fell the day he was born. During this trip, he finds the ice from the meteor and falls, striking his chest, and awakens with a new identity. His heart tells him that his new name is Bro and his goal is to unite all 23,000 of his brothers and sisters of the Light.

Fer - The first sister that Bro awakens using a hammer constructed from the ice. She and Bro often have a very strong connection, referred to as the heart magnet, which helps them find their other brothers and sisters. Together, they are the only ones who are able to distinguish between average people and their siblings.

Ep - The first brother, who is awakened by both Bro and Fer.

Ig - Originally named Deribas. He was part of an illegal group of the Russian Social-Democratic Workers' Party and later became an ambassador of the OGPU, the predecessor of the KGB. Due to his position, he is able to help Bro and their siblings adapt to human life by providing them with jobs.

Khram - One of the successors of Fer and Bro. Like her two siblings, she has a seeing heart. At the end of the novel, she must travel east to find her other half - the other sibling with the ability to find the members of the Light.

== Major themes ==
Connection to Nazi Germany - A theme that comes into play later in the novel is the themes associated with Nazi Germany. Sorokin has been quoted saying that, “its frightening that all cities are beginning to resemble each other. People are becoming the same and dressing the same. The complete unification of humanity is underway.” In Bro the Brotherhood encounters Hitler and Nazi Germany, and the theme of one person or group controlling the whole is brought up. An article by Birgit Menzel talks about the themes in Bro: "The idea of an elected Indo-Aryan race with the mission to purge the world of millions of unworthy lives refers to the connection between Nazi mysticism and the Russian nationalist version of the occult one finds in the theories of Alexander Dugin and Lev Gumilyov."

Identity - The protagonist of the story changes irrevocably after the explosion which kills his brother, father, and uncle. The protagonist then acquires a new identity, and becomes not truly human. Identity, and the concept of being reborn is a theme constantly touched upon in this novel.

Religion - Certain features of the novel are particularly reminiscent of religion, especially notions of creation myths, heaven, the brotherhood, and souls. Perhaps the most prominent example in the novel is the tale Bro internalizes when he undergoes his awakening. Similar to the creation myth of other religions, the story begins with an ultimate being, in this case, the Primordial Light creating the universe, including the Earth, inhabited by the 23,000 light rays, which evolve into the brotherhood. This brotherhood, comparable to any religious congregation, further contributes to the religious allusions. Within the group, they often use their heart rather than speech, placing greater emphasis on emotion, rather than reason, symbolizing a favoring of the soul, an important notion in religion. As Alexei Pavlenko writes: "Sorokin's language about the heart's awakening and its ability to communicate with other awakened hearts is compelling because it resonates with an ancient and rich mythology. In the Judeo-Christian and other ancient traditions…the heart is seen as the center of man's life, the point of ultimate presence." Finally, although Sorokin never explicitly addresses the afterlife, it is implied that the brotherhood are reunited after death, in an environment similar to heaven.

Society - In his interview, Sorokin states that The Ice Trilogy representative of his disappointment with society: "More precisely, contemporary civilization means the entire twentieth century, whose ready-made goods for mass consumption, mediocre taste and mass production have gradually transformed people into 'meat machines.' Multiply this by the total atheism advancing upon us, and human begins become a cog in this machine…" To reflect this view, Sorokin has attributed the name 'meat machine' to the ordinary humans in the novel and grotesquely describes all relevant aspects of humanity: life, death, warfare, crime, deceit and greed.

Violence - Connected to the theme of Nazi Germany is the overall theme of violence throughout the novel. The Brotherhood of the Light uses violence, specifically smashing people's chests with hammers, and later murdering people. In the same interview, Sorokin is asked why he brings up violence so much in this novel. Sorokin replies that violence fascinates him, "Why can’t people do without violence? Why can’t they keep from killing? This is a mystery to me, and I try to talk about it in literary form.” Sorokin also mentions how violence is often justified by some overall goal, and how he plays with this idea in Bro, "There is an idea, a lofty goal, in Bro the killing takes place in the name of a lofty goal."

== Literary significance ==
Sorokin diverges away from traditional Russian literature with this novel. This is described as "betraying Russian prose." Sorokin replies that, "As before, they think of it as something sacred. There is a kind of secret in literature and the literary process, to be sure. But literature is not a temple, and it should not be assigned the function of sacred texts. Russian writers shouldn’t be made into priests.” Bro is significant because it shows that Sorokin's urge to break away from traditional Russian literature goes along with his intent to mirror actual events in society with this novel. Sorokin states, "To my mind the entire Ice Trilogy is a discussion of the twentieth century. It’s a kind of monument to it. You can look at this as a metaphor, or as science fiction, or as some sort of conspiratorial novel." Sorokin mirrors many themes of real events in this novel, such as alluding to the control of Nazi Germany and human obsession with violence.

== Development history ==
In an interview, Sorokin states that he first began thinking about The Ice Trilogy while teaching Russian language and literature in Japan. After finishing the first novel, Ice, he realized that he could not simply move on to his next work. Instead he wanted to return to the theme of his disappointment with contemporary society, sensing that the story was not yet complete and so he began the prequel, Bro.

== Explanation of the novel's title ==
Titled, Put' Bro, or Bro's Way, in Russian, the title takes the name of the protagonist after he has undergone his awakening. It reflects the significance of the discovery of his new identity as a part of the brotherhood and sisterhood of the Light, as well as his quest to unite the 23,000.
