= Natalia Krandievskaya =

Russian poet & memoirist (1888–1963)

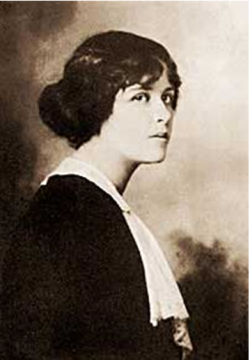
Natalia Krandievskaya (undated)

Natalia Vasilyevna Krandievskaya (Russian: Наталья Васильевна Крандиевская; 1888–1963) was a poet and memoirist born in the Russian Empire. She published three books of poetry, a collection of poems devoted to the Siege of Leningrad, and a book of memoirs. Her second marriage was to the writer Alexey Tolstoy. The couple lived in exile together for several years after the Russian Revolution.

== Life ==
Natalia Krandievskaya was born into a literary family. Her father was the publisher and journalist Vasily Afanasyevich Krandievsky, and her mother was Anastasiya Krandievskaya (1865-1938), a realist prose writer. She begain writing poetry at the age of seven, and was first published at the age of 14. In her first published book-length collection (1913) she tried to differentiate herself from both symbolism and the new movement of acmeist poetry:

They're not my kind who meet the life'
As in a dream...

Krandievskaya separated from her first husband, Fyodor Volkenstein, in 1914. She embarked on a romance with the writer Alexey Tolstoy, later marrying him, and for the next two decades gave up writing herself. The couple fled Russia with their children in summer 1918, living in exile as White émigrés until summer 1923. Initially they moved to Odessa, before settling in Paris, where they lived alongside other émigrés such as Teffi, Ivan Bunin and his wife Vera Muromtseva. In October 1921 the couple settled in Germany. In March 1922 the Russian-language newspaper Nakanune was started in Berlin, with Tolstoy as literary editor. Later that year Anna Akhmatova objected to Nakanune republishing her poems without permission, and in a poem Akhmatova criticized exiled intellectuals in an echo of Krandievskaya's earlier verse:

They’re not my kind who left the land
To enemies and plundering...

In 1934 Krandievskaya created a libretto opera in verse, Decembrists. She separated from Tolstoy in 1935. In 1959 she published a book of memoirs, I Remember, reissed in a second edition as Memoirs (1977).

The physicist Nikita Tolstoy (1923–1996) was Krandievskaya's son. Grandchildren include the writers Natalia Tolstaya and Tatyana Tolstaya, who made her the subject of a short story, 'Yorick'.

== Works ==
- Стихотворения [Poems]. Moscow: Nekrasova. 1913.
- Стихотворения. Кн. 2 [Poems. Book 2]. Odessa: Omphalos, 1919.
- От лукавого [From the Evil One]. Moscow-Berlin, 1922.
- Гришкины путешествия. Австралия [Grishkin's Travels: Australia]. Berlin: Nakanune, 1923.
