= Mikhail Lozinsky =

Russian writer

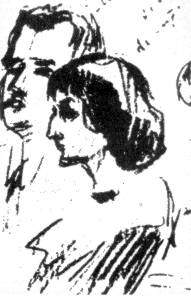
Sketch of Lozinsky and Akhmatova, by Sergey Gorodetsky, 1913.

Mikhail Leonidovich Lozinsky (Russian: Михаил Леонидович Лозинский; 20 July 1886 – 31 January 1955) was a Russian translator and poet. He is deemed to be the most accomplished Russian translator of the 20th century. "In the difficult and noble art of translation," said Anna Akhmatova, "Lozinsky was for the twentieth century what Zhukovsky was for the nineteenth."

Lozinsky was born in Gatchina and spent his life in St. Petersburg. His uncle was married to an aunt of Alexander Blok, who was one of the first to appreciate Lozinsky's highly polished verse. During the Silver Age of Russian Poetry he was close to the Acmeist circle of Nikolay Gumilyov; he was briefly arrested and interrogated following the latter's execution.

Despite his impeccable craftsmanship, Lozinsky's poetry failed to attract public attention owing to its lack of substance and originality. Lozinsky therefore began applying his literary skills to the translation of works by notable non-Russian literary figures such as Benvenuto Cellini, Lope de Vega, Richard Brinsley Sheridan, and others. In his diary, Blok noted that some of Lozinsky's translations were superior to those of Zhukovsky, who had been regarded as a model for Russian verse translators for generations.

Lozinsky's greatest feat was his translation of Dante's The Divine Comedy which he completed between 1939 and 1945 in spite of poor health. This accomplishment won him the Stalin Prize in 1946.

Lozinsky's copious translations of Shakespeare have been somewhat less popular than contemporary translations by Boris Pasternak and Samuil Marshak. Unlike them, Lozinsky did not strive to modernise Shakespeare by stripping him of obscure details and puns. Soviet critics tended to dismiss his Shakespeare translations as "obscure, heavy, and unintelligible"; Akhmatova, however, felt that Lozinsky brilliantly achieved his aim of "conveying the age of Shakespeare's language and the complexity about which even the English complain".

Lozinsky's granddaughters include writers Tatyana Tolstaya and Natalia Tolstaya.
