= Vladimir Sorokin =

Russian writer (born 1955)

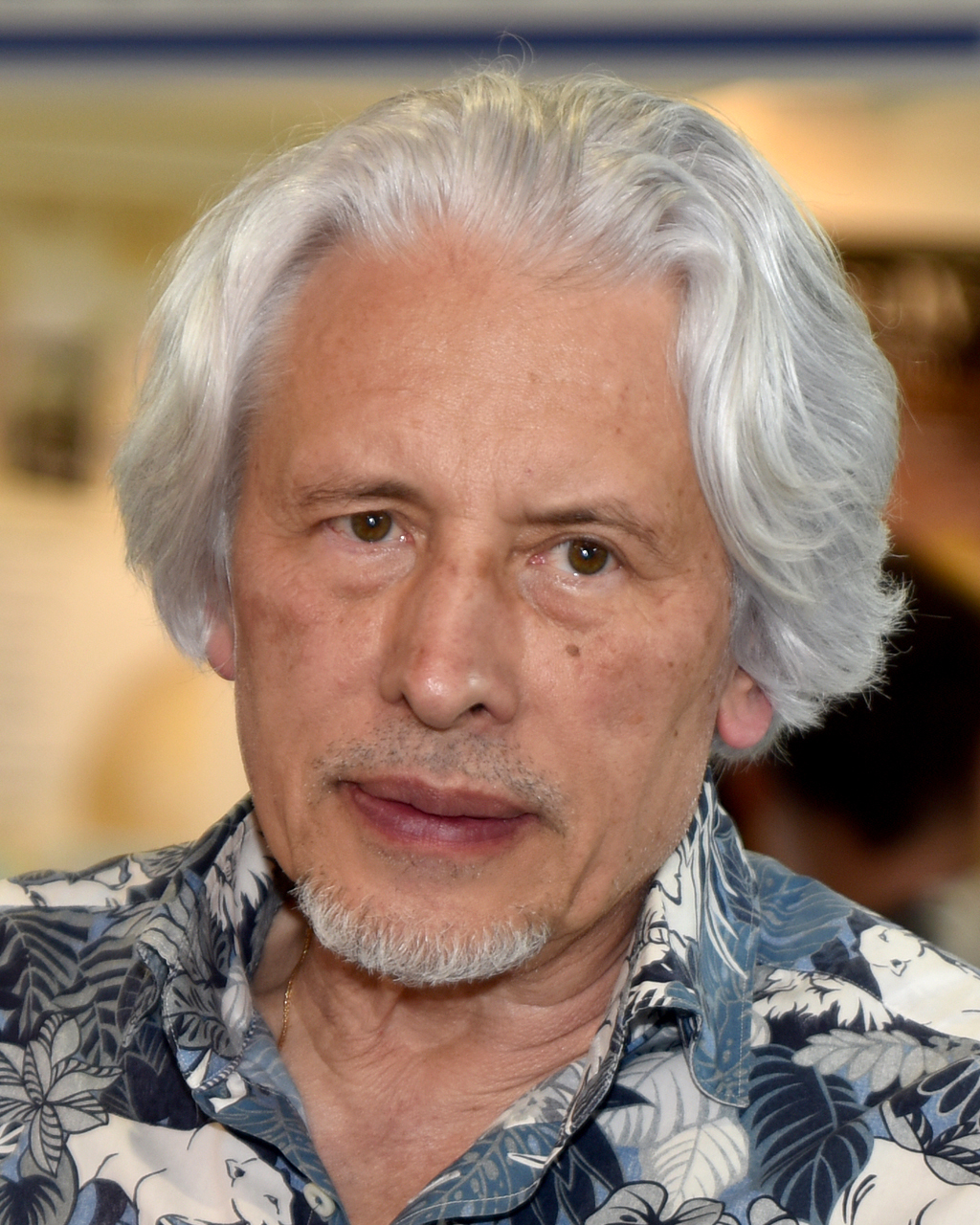
- Sorokin in 2023
- Born: Vladimir Georgiyevich Sorokin; 7 August 1955 (age 71); Bykovo, Moscow Oblast, Russian SFSR, Soviet Union
- Citizenship: Russian
- Education: Gubkin Russian State University of Oil and Gas
- Occupations: Writer; painter
- Writing career
- Language: Russian
- Years active: since 1977
- Period: Contemporary
- Genres: Novel; novella; short story; sketch; prose poem; play; script; libretto
- Notable works: Ice (2002), The Blizzard (2010)
- Movement: Russian postmodernism
- Website: vladimirsorokin.org

Vladimir Georgiyevich Sorokin (Russian: Влади́мир Гео́ргиевич Соро́кин; born 7 August 1955) is a postmodern Russian writer of novels, short stories, and plays.

He has been described as one of the leading and most popular writers in contemporary Russian literature. Sorokin became known for his provocative and satirical works combining elements of dystopia, alternative history and science fiction, and the grotesque. One of Sorokin's recognisable literary techniques is stylistic mimicry: he imitates various literary styles, from socialist realism to classical Russian prose.

In Russia, Vladimir Sorokin's works have many times become the subject of public discussion, including lawsuits. Since the Russian invasion of Ukraine in 2022, he has been living in exile in Berlin.

== Biography ==
Sorokin was born on 7 August 1955 in Bykovo, Ramensky District, Moscow Oblast. In 1972, he made his literary debut with a publication in the newspaper Za kadry neftyanikov (Russian: За кадры нефтяников, For the workers in the petroleum industry). He studied at the Gubkin Russian State University of Oil and Gas in Moscow and graduated in 1977 as an engineer.

After graduation, he worked as illustrator for one year for the magazine Shift (Russian: Смена, Smena), before he had to leave due to his refusal to become a member of the Komsomol.

Throughout the 1970s, Sorokin participated in a number of art exhibitions and designed and illustrated nearly 50 books. Sorokin's development as a writer took place amidst painters and writers of the Moscow underground scene of the 1980s. In 1985, six of Sorokin's stories appeared in the Paris magazine A-Ya. In the same year, French publisher Syntaxe published his novel Ochered' (The Queue).

Sorokin is a devout Christian, having been baptized at the age of 25.

Sorokin's works, examples of underground nonconformist art, including his first novel The Norm (1983), were banned during the Soviet pre-Perestroika period. His first publication in the USSR appeared in November 1989, when the Riga-based Latvian magazine Rodnik (Spring) presented a group of Sorokin's stories. Soon after, his stories appeared in Russian literary miscellanies and magazines Tretya Modernizatsiya (The Third Modernization), Mitin Zhurnal (Mitya's Journal), Konets Veka (End of the Century), and Vestnik Novoy Literatury (Bulletin of the New Literature). In 1992, Russian publishing house Russlit published Sbornik Rasskazov (Collected Stories) – Sorokin's first book to be nominated for a Russian Booker Prize. Sorokin's early stories and novels are characterized by the combination of socialist-realist discourse with extreme physiological or absurd content; Sorokin himself has described his early writings as "little binary literary bombs made up of two incompatible parts: one socialist realist, and the other based on actual physiology, resulting in an explosion, and this gave me, the writer, a little spark of freedom."

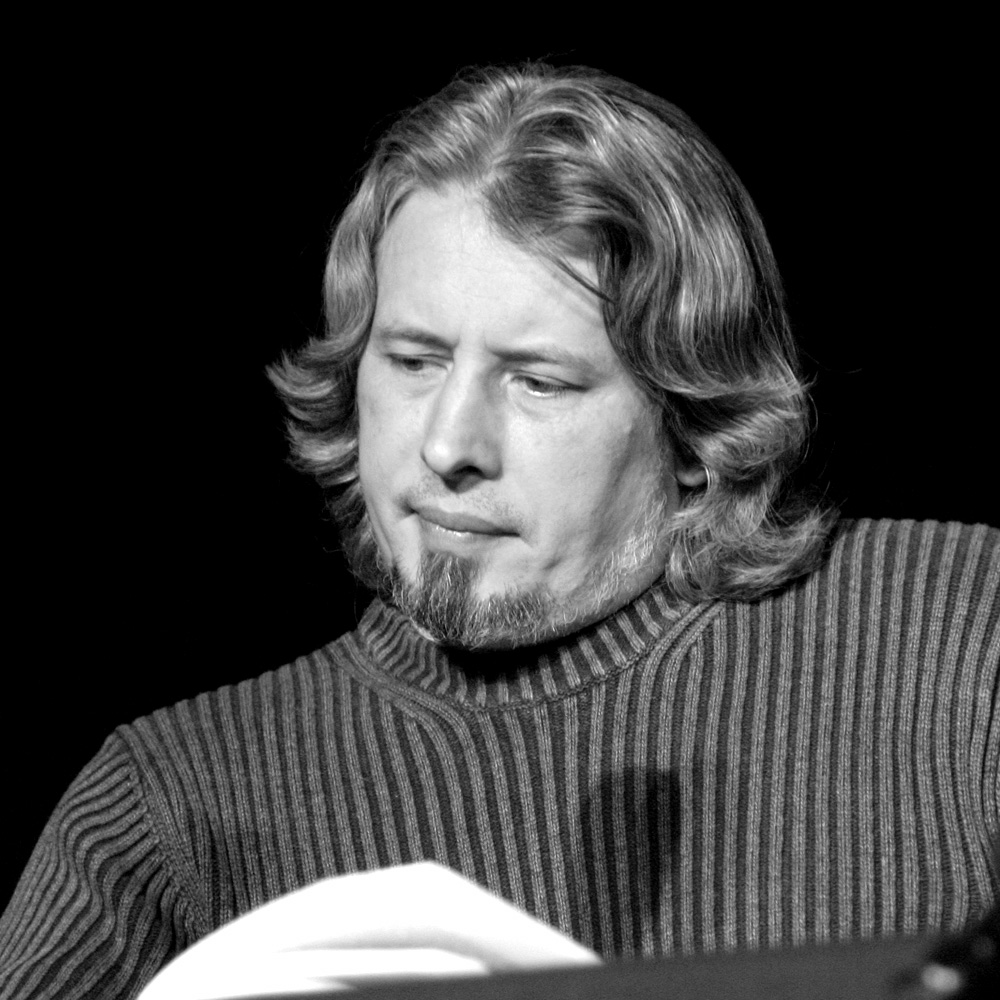
Vladimir Sorokin at the Cologne literature festival in March 2006.

In September 2001, Vladimir Sorokin received the People's Booker Prize; two months later, he was presented with the Andrei Bely Prize for outstanding contributions to Russian literature. In 2002, there was a protest against his book Blue Lard, and he was investigated for pornography.

His 2006 novel, Day of the Oprichnik, describes a dystopian Russia in 2028, with a Tsar in the Kremlin, a Russian language with numerous Chinese expressions, and a "Great Russian Wall" separating the country from its neighbors. In 2015, he was awarded the Premio Gregor von Rezzori for this novel. In 2011 he received the second prize of the Russian Big Book award for The Blizzard (Метель); three years later, he received another second prize for Telluria.

In 2016 he was accused by pro-Kremlin activists of "extremism", "pro-cannibalism themes" and "going against Russian Orthodox values" because of his satirical short story "Nastya" (2000), which describes how a 16-year-old is cooked alive in an oven and eaten by her family and friends.

Sorokin's books have been translated into English, Portuguese, Spanish, French, German, Dutch, Finnish, Swedish, Norwegian, Danish, Italian, Polish, Japanese, Serbian, Korean, Romanian, Estonian, Lithuanian, Slovak, Czech, Hungarian, Croatian and Slovenian, and are available through a number of prominent publishing houses, including Gallimard, Fischer, DuMont, BV Berlin, Haffman, Mlinarec & Plavic and Verlag der Autoren.

In December 2019, Russian filmmaker Ilya Belov released the documentary "Sorokin Trip", in which he portrayed and examined the writer's life and work. The film was nominated for Best Documentary for The Golden Unicorn Awards in 2019.

=== 2022 Russian invasion of Ukraine ===
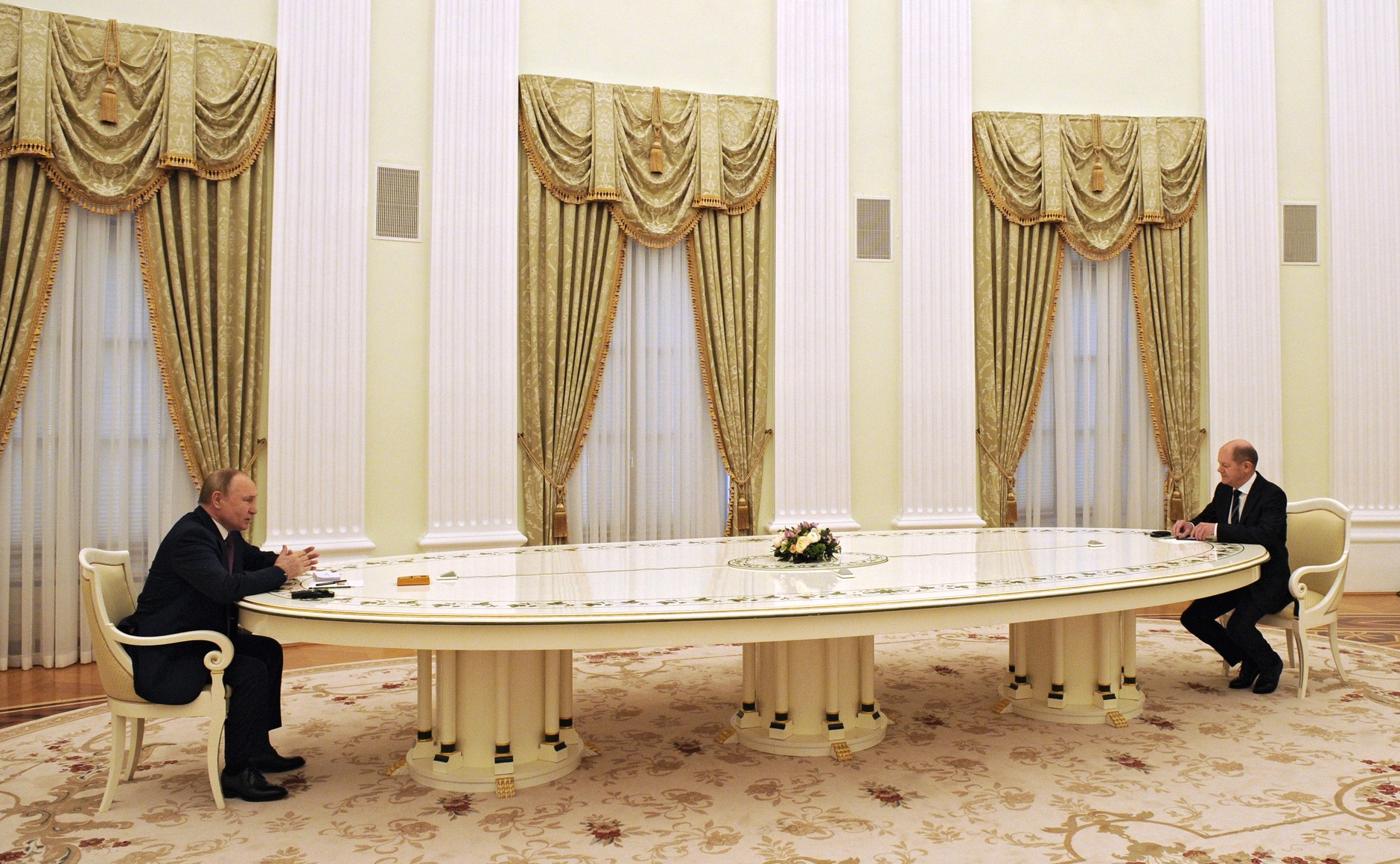
Putin converses with Olaf Scholz at the "totally paranoid table" on 15 February 2022

Three days after the 24 February 2022 Russian invasion of Ukraine, Sorokin published a piece highly critical of Vladimir Putin. In it he compared Putin to Ivan the Terrible and power in Russia to a medieval pyramid. He wrote: "The idea of restoring the Russian Empire has entirely taken possession of Putin," and he faulted the destruction of the TV channel NTV for providing an opening. "Putin didn’t manage to outgrow the KGB officer inside of him, the officer who’d been taught that the USSR was the greatest hope for the progress of mankind and that the West was an enemy capable only of corruption."

Yet another head of a European country flies to the Kremlin so as to listen through their traditional portion of fantastical lies (now at an enormous, totally paranoid table), to nod their head, to say that “the dialogue turned out to be fairly constructive” at a press conference, then to just fly away.

—

For Sorokin, Putin's ultimate goal is not Ukraine but the dismemberment of NATO and the destruction of Western civilization.

In March 2022, Sorokin was among the signatories of an appeal by eminent writers to all Russian speakers to spread the truth inside Russia about the war against Ukraine.

Following Sorokin's criticism of the Russian government, his books have been withdrawn from a number of Russian booksellers.

== Bibliography ==
=== Novels and novellas ===
- Норма (written 1979–1983, published by Tri Kita and Obscuri Viri, 1994). The Norm, trans. Max Lawton (New York Review Books, forthcoming)
- Очередь (written 1983, published by Syntaxe, 1985). The Queue, trans. Sally Laird (Readers International, 1988; New York Review Books, 2008; ISBN 9781590172742)
- Тридцатая любовь Марины (written 1982–1984, published by Elinina, 1995). Marina’s 30th Love, trans. Max Lawton (Dalkey Archive, forthcoming)
- Роман (written 1985–1989, published by Tri Kita and Obscuri Viri, 1994). Roman, trans. Max Lawton (Dalkey Archive, forthcoming)
- Сердца Четырех (written 1991, published 1994). Their Four Hearts, trans. Max Lawton (Dalkey Archive, 2022)
- Голубое Сало (Ad Marginem, 1999). Blue Lard, trans. Max Lawton (New York Review Books, 2024)
- Лёд (Ad Marginem, 2002). Ice, trans. Jamey Gambrell (New York Review Books, 2007; ISBN 1-59017-195-0)
- Путь Бро (Zakharov Books, 2004). Bro, trans. Jamey Gambrell (in Ice Trilogy, 2011).
- 23'000 (Zakharov Books, 2005). 23,000, trans. Jamey Gambrell (in Ice Trilogy, 2011).
- День опричника (Zakharov Books, 2006). Day of the Oprichnik, trans. Jamey Gambrell (2010; ISBN 978-0374134754)
- Сахарный кремль (AST, 2008). The Sugar Kremlin, trans. Max Lawton (Dalkey Archive, 2025)
- Метель (AST, 2010). The Blizzard, trans. Jamey Gambrell (Farrar, Straus and Giroux, 2015; ISBN 978-0374114374)
- Теллурия (AST, 2013). Telluria, trans. Max Lawton (New York Review Books, 2022)
- Манарага (Corpus, 2017; ISBN 978-5-17-102757-5). Manaraga
- Доктор Гарин (Corpus, 2021; ISBN 978-5-17-136253-9). Doctor Garin
- Наследие (Corpus, 2023; ISBN 978-5-17-160469-1). Legacy

Omnibus editions

- Ice Trilogy (New York Review Books, 2011; ISBN 978-1590173862). Bro, Ice, and 23,000 published together in one volume.

=== Short fiction ===
Collections

- Первый субботник (written 1979–1984, published by Russlit, 1992). The First Subotnik / My First Working Saturday
- Месяц в дахау (written 1990, published 1994). A Month in Dachau
- Пир (Ad Marginem, 2000). Feast
- Заплыв (AST, 2008). Swim
- Моноклон (АST, 2010). Monoclonius
- Белый квадрат (Corpus, 2018). The White Square
- Русские народные пословицы и поговорки (Corpus, 2020; ISBN 978-5-17-122974-0). Russian folk proverbs and sayings
- De feminis (Corpus, 2022; ISBN 978-5-17-149740-8).
- Red Pyramid and Other Stories, trans. Max Lawton (New York Review Books, 2024; ISBN 9781681378206)
- Dispatches from the District Committee, trans. Max Lawton (Dalkey Archive, 2024)

Stories

- "Red Pyramid". The New Yorker. 97 (31). Translated by Max Lawton: 56–61. 4 October 2021.
- "Nastya". The Baffler. 66. Translated by Max Lawton. December 2022.

=== Plays ===
- Пельмени (1984–1987). Pelmeni
- Землянка (1985). The Dugout
- Русская бабушка (1988). Russian Grandmother
- Доверие (1989). Confidence
- Дисморфомания (1990). Dysmorphomania
- Юбилей (1993). Anniversary
- Hochzeitsreise (1994–1995). The Post-Nuptial Journey
- Щи (1995–1996). Shchi
- Dostoevsky-Trip (1997).
- С Новым Годом (1998). Happy New Year
- Капитал (2006). Capital
- Занос (2009). The Snow Drift

=== Film scripts ===
- Безумный Фриц ("Mad Fritz") (1994). Directors: Tatiana Didenko and Alexander Shamaysky.
- Москва ("Moscow") (2000). Director: Alexander Zeldovich. First Prize in the festival in Bonn; Award of Federation of Russian Film-Clubs for best Russian movie of the year.
- Копейка ("Kopeck") (2002). Director: Ivan Dykhovichny. Nomination for Zolotoy Oven Award for best film script.
- Вещь ("Thing") (2002). Director: Ivan Dykhovichny.
- 4 ("Four") (2005). Director: Ilya Khrzhanovsky. Grand Jury Prize of International Film Festival Rotterdam.
- Мишень ("Target") (2011). Director: Alexander Zeldovich.

=== Other works ===
- Photograph album В глубь России ("Into the Depths of Russia"), in cooperation with painter Oleg Kulik.
- Libretto for opera Дети Розенталя ("The Children of Rosenthal"), with music by Leonid Desyatnikov; written on request of the Bolshoi Theatre, Moscow.
- Нормальная история ("A Normal Story") (2019), a collection of Sorokin's essays written in the 2010s.
- Dozens of stories published in Russian and foreign periodicals.
