= Sally Laird =

British editor and translator

- Born: 2 May 1956; Barnet
- Died: 15 July 2010 (aged 54)
- Occupation(s): writer and translator
- Children: 1

Sally Ann Laird (2 May 1956 – 15 July 2010) was a British editor and translator who specialised in Russian literature.

== Education ==
Laird was born in the London Borough of Barnet and attended Camden School for Girls. She was a student of Russian and philosophy at St Anne's College, Oxford. She was editor of The Isis Magazine at Oxford. Laird went on to Harvard University, on a Harkness Fellowship, where she gained an MA in Soviet studies in 1981. As part of her Oxford degree, she spent a year at Voronezh State University.

== Career ==
Laird worked for Amnesty International during the 1980s. She was USSR editor for the magazine Index on Censorship between June 1986 and November 1988, when she became editor-in-chief. She held the job until August 1989.

After leaving the magazine she worked as a translator and editor, and reviewed books for The Observer. She translated a series of Russian novels. The Washington Post reviewed her translation of Lyudmila Petrushevskaya's The Time: Night: "Sally Laird's version, although a bit British and a bit bowdlerized, conveys the wonderful fluidity and occasional frenzy of the monologue "written" by Petrushevskaya's narrator".

Laird became project manager of the Central European Classics series, brought out by Central European University Press.

She contributed to Till my Tale is Told: Women’s Memoirs of the Gulag, and wrote Voices of Russian Literature: Interviews with Ten Contemporary Writers, the latter based on interviews she carried out between 1987 and 1994.

In 1993, Laird moved to Denmark, living at Ebeltoft. She learnt Danish and worked as a translator between English and Danish.

== Personal life ==
Laird and her husband Mark Le Fanu had one daughter. Laird died in 2010.

== Writing ==
- Translation of The Queue, by Vladimir Sorokin (Readers International, 1988; New York Review Books, 2008; ISBN 9781590172742)
- Translation of The Time: Night, by Ludmila Petrushevskaya (Pantheon Books, 1994)
- Translation of Immortal Love: Stories, by Ludmilla Petrushevskaya (Pantheon Books, 1996)
- Voices of Russian Literature: Interviews with Ten Contemporary Writers (Oxford University Press, 1999)
- Till my Tale is Told: Women’s Memoirs of the Gulag, ed Simeon Vilensky, (Indiana University Press, 1999)
