= The Queue (Sorokin novel) =

1983 novel by Vladimir Sorokin

- First edition
- Author: Vladimir Sorokin
- Original title: Очередь
- Translator: Sally Laird
- Language: Russian
- Genre: Fiction novel
- Publication date: 1983
- Publication place: Russia
- English publication date: 1988
- Media type: Print (hardback and paperback)
- Pages: 280
- ISBN: 978-1-59017-274-2

The Queue is a 1983 novel by Russian writer Vladimir Sorokin, first published in France in 1985 after being banned in the USSR, and in English by Readers International in 1988. It has been described as "a bizarrely funny saga of a quintessential Russian institution, the interminably long line." The Library Journal describes Sorokin’s work as being an “avant-garde experiment" with a "flair of nonsense."

The Queue does not follow a traditional narrative style. Instead, it is told in dialogue form, so as to make the reader feel like they are part of the line. As described by the Library Journal, the text lacks description, setting, or stage direction. Instead it is filled with nothing but voices: snatches of conversation, rumors, jokes, howls of humor, roll calls, and sexy moans.

== Plot summary ==
A man is waiting in a seemingly endless line, but for what? The Queue begins with a cacophony of voices and the protagonist, Vadim, encountering a woman named Lena. As the day progresses the queue-goers realize that they have no choice but to come back the next day to finally receive their items. A woman comes along handing out numbers so that the next day there will be limited chaos. Vadim and Lena end up spending the night in the park on benches along with other members of the queue. And again the same process begins all over again; people sharing their speculations of what’s being sold, others trying to figure out the rate that the line is moving, and the occasional break from waiting in the queue to get food or drink—essentially waiting in other queues. After this ensues yet another roll-call emphasizing just how many people are waiting for unknown objects. Finally after two days of waiting it appears that the end of the line is in sight, but suddenly it begins pouring and Vadim seeks shelter. He is taken into an apartment owned by a woman named Lyuda. After a simple meal and an intelligent discussion, the two of them make love and fall asleep. The next morning Lyuda reveals that she works at the store everyone is queued up for, and that his days of waiting were in vain.

== Character descriptions ==
Lena
Lena is the young protagonist of the novel. She is first introduced in the novel while she is waiting in line for an unknown product. Lena studies at the Textiles Institute. She is unsure what her place is society is, and seeks to find an identity through relationships.

Vadim
Vadim is the other protagonist in the novel, who is first introduced when he meets Lena in line. Vadim is part of the Intelligentsia class, making his role in Post Soviet Russia a complicated matter to find. He studied history at Moscow State University, and works editing articles for a technical journal.

Volodya
Volodya is young boy waiting alongside his mother in line. Unlike the many other characters of The Queue, Volodya is innocent and unaware of the wrongs in society.

Lyudmila
Lyudmila is introduced in the latter part of the novel, is Vadim's key to no longer having to wait in line. She begins a spur of the moment romance with Vadim, when she seems in him in line and decides to bring him back to her house. Lyudmila works at the Moskva stores, the ones distributing the goods in the line. Lyudmila controls the movement of the line, and has little consideration for the many people waiting for their goods.

The Collective
The Collective is the group of people in line. They are represented by indiscriminate voices.

The Voice
The Voice is a nameless authority which keeps the line in order.

== Major themes ==
Ordinary life

Most of the chatter up and down the queue is the kind one hears every day—it's deliberately, sometimes comically ordinary. This use of ordinary life within the Soviet Union demonstrates how "queues" or lines in this time period were a fundamental part of life, and the conversations which took place demonstrated how common lines had become. In fact people would refuse to buy anything without a queue because no long line means there must not be anything worth waiting for. But, if there was a queue people would line up for items they had absolutely no need for.

The passage of time

The main character, Vadim, demonstrates the extreme length of time that large amounts of Russian citizens were willing to stand in line for an unknown, always changing items.

Queue

Sorokin's novel parodies the Russian queue with a mix of truth and hyperbole. Lines were such a recognizable facet of the Russian experience during the Soviet Union, that the commercial newspaper Kommersant announced, were the "laws of our time".

== Literary significance ==
One of The Queue’s primary and most distinctive literary features is in its peculiar structure. The Queue is composed exclusively in dialogue, and the reader is limited to small exchanges that take place among the people waiting in line. Although a narrator never interferes with these conversations, characters do emerge from the chatter, based upon their distinct voice and interactions with others in the line. Elaine Blair writes, "In his fidelity to quotidian street conversation, Sorokin thumbs his nose at Socialist realism: he offers exactly the realism that would never be permitted in official Soviet writing". Some see The Queue as a comment on Soviet society, according to Mary Zirin "This novel reduces to delightful absurdity the rough democracy of the long lines that Soviet people-in-the-street endure in order to buy "luxury" goods." This literary use forces the reader to recognize subtle distinctions in voice, to determine which character, known or unknown is speaking. Also, the entire setting of The Queue is not created through descriptions, but only through casual references to the weather or location.

== Publication history ==
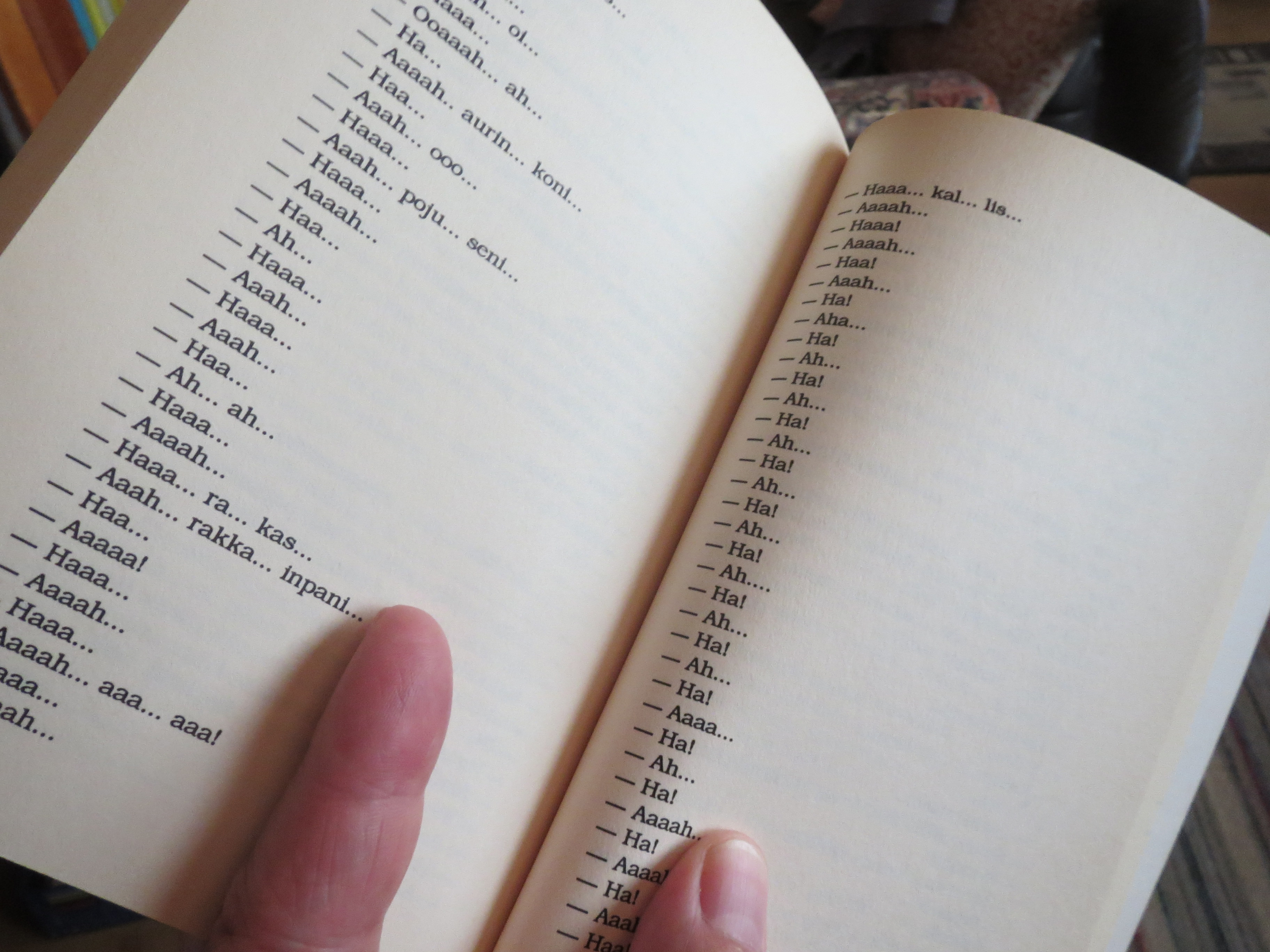
Enjoying the Queue in Finnish

The Queue, Sorokin's first novel, was initially banned in the Soviet Union but was published by the émigré dissident Andrei Sinyavsky in France in 1985. An English translation was published by Readers International in 1988.(ISBN 093052344X). The novel was later published in the United States. The English translation by Sally Laird has received criticism for rendering the text with British idioms. Slang language like "a bit of alright," wogs," "here's our cuppa," and "don't fancy that" have been said to distract from the overall meaning of the novel.

== Development history ==
“More and more people in the Soviet Union have found that diligent and conscientious work for official goals is not rewarded as much as the abuse of their position in public sectors for their personal interests or their activity in the second economy and other spheres of illegal civil society, and it does not provide the rewards of devotion to family, friends, and loved ones." Ultimately, the novel speaks to the injustice in Post-Soviet society. There is no functional way to move ahead in life, unless an individual succumbs to corruption. The only sanctuary one has is in their family and friends.

== Explanation of novel's title ==
The title The Queue represents the central focus of the novel. Instead of the book being based on the characters, it is centered on the collective movement of the line as everyone waits for their elusive items. "The Russian queue was not simply a social presence, but was also a social principle one that regulated social entitlements in time. It enshrined the social and psychological idea of consumption through state distribution...people stay in the queues for cars or apartments for years."

== Pop culture references ==
Throughout the novel there are several references to Western culture and consumer items. In one instance the topic switches over to one of the latest Beatle’s songs—with a great majority of people in the line being able to sing along. Even Ronald Reagan is mentioned in the discussion of American politics with the topic revolving around the debate of free speech, and whether it can truly be possible. Russian institutions are also discussed with references to Moscow State University, Teachers Training, and Steel and Alloys Institute.

== Adaptations ==
- Made into a play entitled The Queue.
- Translated into English in 1988
