= Blue Lard =

Novel by Russian author Vladimir Sorokin

- Cover of the 2024 English edition by NYRB
- Author: Vladimir Sorokin
- Original title: Голубое сало
- Translator: Max Lawton
- Language: Russian
- Genre: Novel, Postmodern fiction, Dystopian fiction
- Publisher: Ad Marginem (Russian), NYRB (English)
- Publication date: 1999
- Publication place: Russia
- English publication date: 2024

Blue Lard (Russian: Голубое сало, romanized: Goluboye salo) is a postmodern novel by Russian writer Vladimir Sorokin. It was first published in 1999 by Ad Marginem.

== Plot ==
The plot of the book revolves around a substance called "blue lard" that the clones of Russian writers produce when they write which is then used to power a hidden reactor on the moon. Some of the cloned Russian writers include Tolstoy, Dostoyevsky, Akhmatova, Chekhov and Nabokov. The novel takes place in two timelines: the second half of the 21st century (set in Siberia and Moscow in the future) and an alternative timeline of 1954 (in Joseph Stalin's Moscow and Adolf Hitler's Third Reich).

== Reception ==
In June 2002, a Russian youth activist group, Walking Together, threw portions of copies of the book into a toilet installed outside the Bolshoi Theatre, in protest of Sorokin's collaboration with the Theatre. The group accused Sorokin of writing pornography, due to the novel's inclusion of a gay sex scene between Khrushchev and Stalin. The toilet was blown up in September 2002 by a group calling itself "The Red Partisans".

The novel received positive reviews from the New York Times and Publishers Weekly. A review from the Financial Times stated that the book helped "cement Sorokin’s place among the greats."

Larissa Volokhonsky stated that it was the only book she ever asked to have removed from her house.
