= Bykovo, Ramensky District, Moscow Oblast =

Bykovo Быко́во
- Urban-type settlement
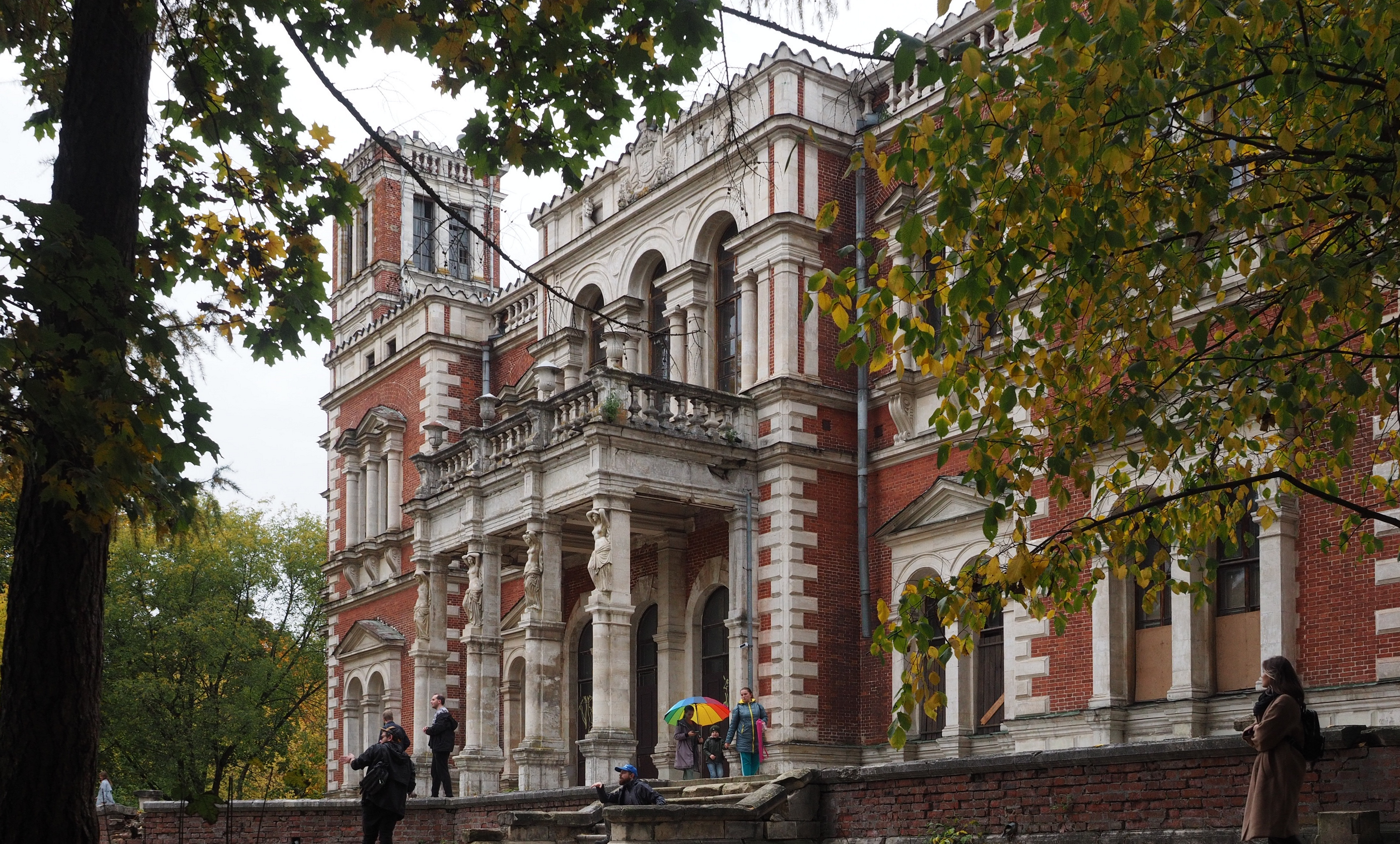
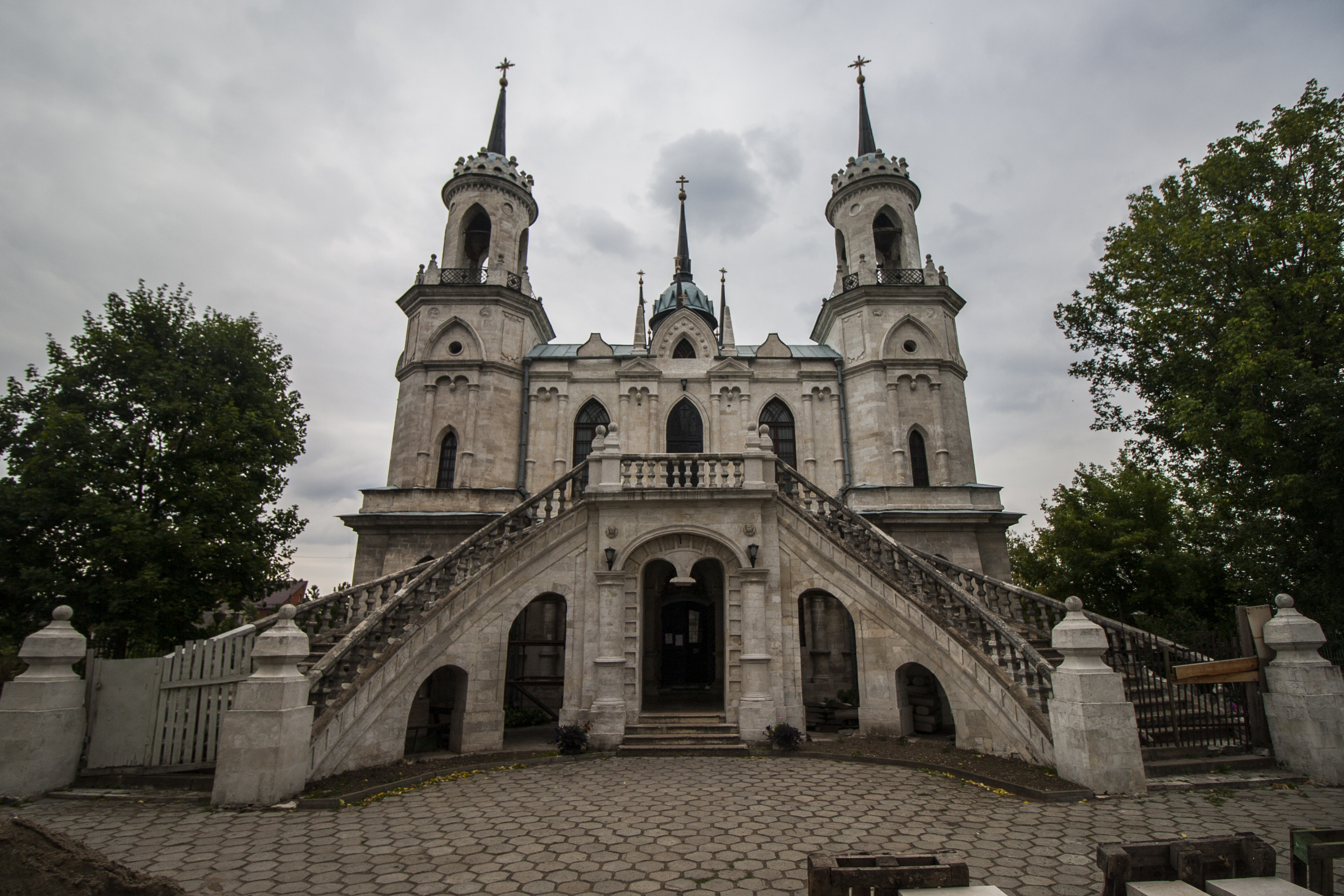

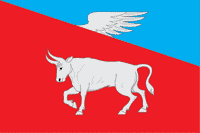
- Flag Coat of arms
- Interactive map of Bykovo
- Location of Bykovo Bykovo (Moscow Oblast)
- Coordinates: 55°37′56″N 38°5′0″E
- Country: Russia
- Federal subject: Moscow Oblast
- Administrative district: Ramensky District

Population (2010 Census)
  - Total: 10,391
  - Estimate (2025): 8,985 (−13.5%)
- Time zone: UTC+3 (MSK)
- Postal code: 140150
- OKTMO ID: 46648152051

Bykovo (Russian: Быко́во) is an urban locality (a work settlement) in Ramensky District of Moscow Oblast, located 34 kilometers (21 mi) southeast of Moscow. Population: 10,391 (2010 census); 9,235 (2002 census); 10,395 (1989 Soviet census).

== History ==
It was founded in 1861–1862 upon construction of the Moscow-Ryazan railroad, replacing the former village 1.5 kilometers (0.93 mi) to the south. Work settlement status was granted to it in 1962.

== Economy ==
The Bykovo Airport and an aircraft repair facility are located here.

== Notable people ==
Bykovo is a home (and a place of birth) for Pavel Chukhrai, Vladimir Sorokin, and Nikolay Rastorguyev.
