= Max Lawton =

American writer and translator

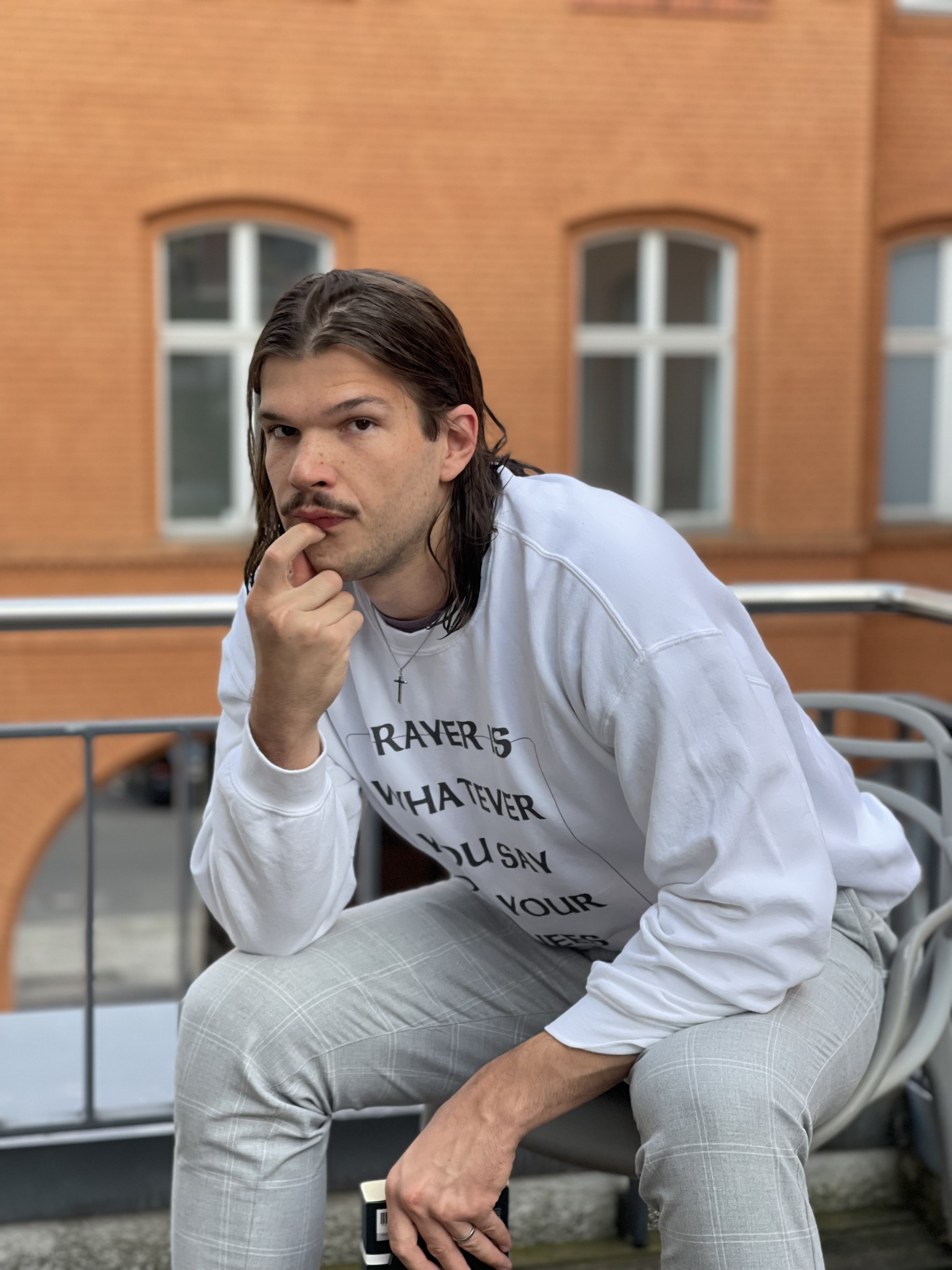
- Born: August 22, 1993 (age 33); Brussels, Belgium
- Education: Columbia University (BA); The Queen's College, Oxford (MPhil)
- Occupations: Translator & Writer
- Spouse: Ecem Lawton
- Writing career
- Notable works: Telluria; Blue Lard
- Notable awards: Helen and Kurt Wolff Translator's Prize; Oxford-Weidenfeld Translation Prize (Longlist); O. Henry Award

Max Lawton is an American writer and translator of Russian literature into English. He is known for translating the works of Vladimir Sorokin, whose Telluria was longlisted for the 2023 Oxford-Weidenfeld Translation Prize. A total of eight of Sorokin's books are being translated into English by Lawton, as well as articles and short stories, including "Horse Soup," which won the O. Henry Award in 2022.

== Biography ==
Lawton was born in Brussels, where he lived for the first 3 years of his life. His mother is the playwright and novelist Alice Austen. Lawton grew up in Chicago. He received his BA in Russian Literature and Culture from Columbia University. He received the Clarendon Fund Scholarship for his Masters of Philosophy from The Queen's College, Oxford. He lives in Los Angeles.

In addition to Russian, Lawton has also translated from French and German, such as Jonathan Littell's The Damp and the Dry and Michael Lentz's novel Schattenfroh.

Lawton has been translating Sorokin's works since 2016, starting with novella Nastya, short story "Horse Soup", and notably completing the first English translation of Blue Lard, a more linguistically complex and longer work than the short stories. Lawton's translation of Red Pyramid: Selected Stories by Vladimir Sorokin won the 2025 AATSEEL prize for Best Translation of Prose into English. In 2026, Lawton's translation of Schattenfroh by Michael Lentz from German to English won the Helen and Kurt Wolff Translator's Prize.

== Selected translations ==
- Moresco, Antonio (2026), The Beginnings, Deep Vellum Publishing, ISBN 9781646053957
- Sorokin, Vladimir (2025), The Sugar Kremlin, Dalkey Archive Press, ISBN 9781628975789
- Lentz, Michael (2025), Schattenfroh, Deep Vellum, ISBN 9781646053827
- Sorokin, Vladimir (2024), Dispatches from the District Committee, Dalkey Archive Press, ISBN 9781628975178, OCLC 1344422372
- Littell, Jonathan (2024), The Damp and the Dry, OR Books, ISBN 9781682193914, OCLC 1344422815
- Sorokin, Vladimir (2024), Blue Lard, NYRB Classics, ISBN 9781681378183, OCLC 1380391734
- Sorokin, Vladimir (2024), Red Pyramid, NYRB Classics, ISBN 9781681378206, OCLC 1389179539
- Sorokin, Vladimir (2022), Telluria, NYRB Classics, ISBN 9781681376332, OCLC 1340418075
- Sorokin, Vladimir (2022), Their Four Hearts, Dalkey Archive Press, ISBN 9781628973969, OCLC 1267752875
- Sorokin, Vladimir (2022), Nastya, The Baffler
