= Michael Lentz =

German author and musician (born 1964)

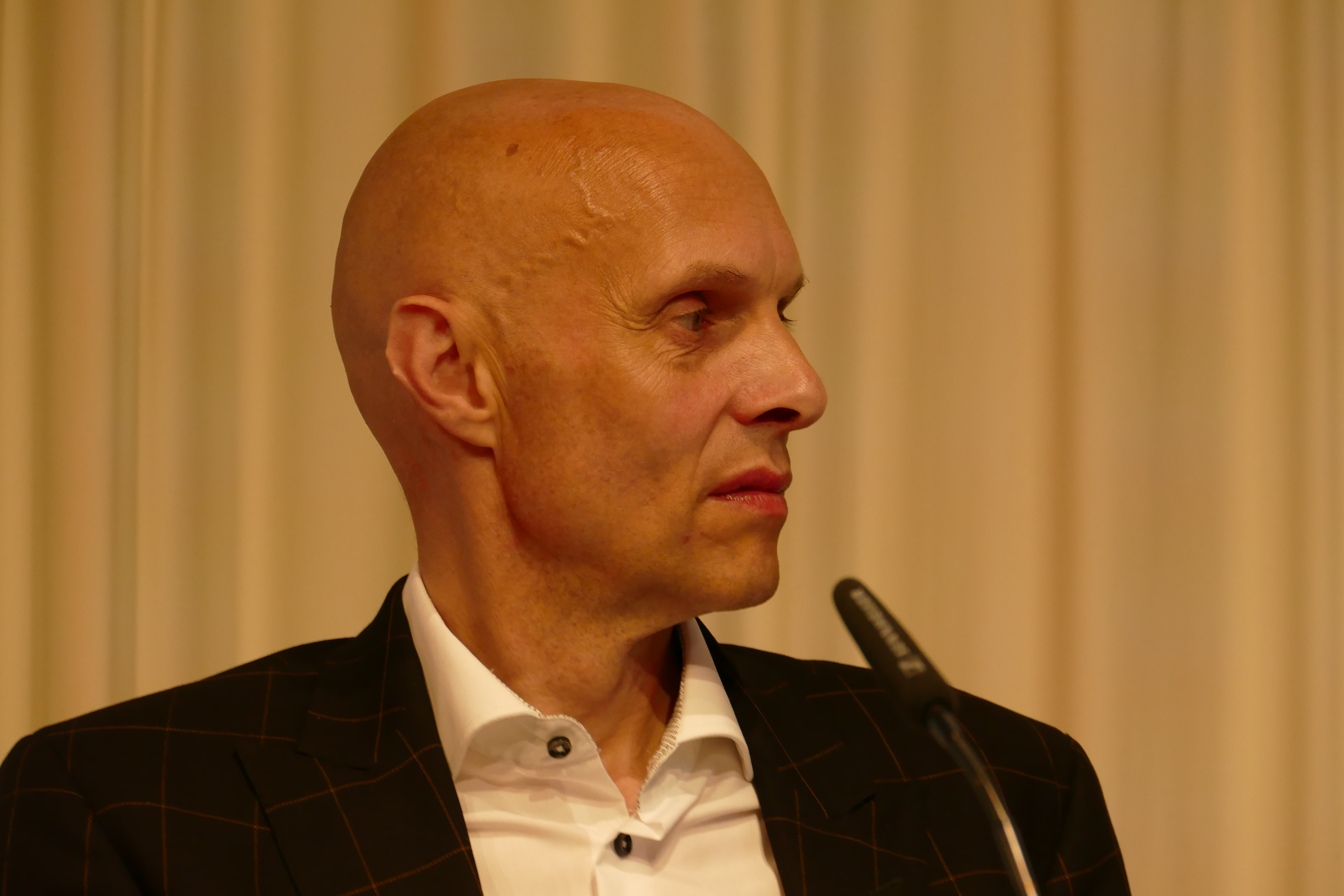
- Michael Lentz in 2018
- Born: 1964 (age 61–62); Düren
- Occupations: Author, musician, and performer
- Writing career
- Genres: Poems, plays, radio plays, short stories, novels
- Notable work: 2001 Ingeborg Bachmann Prize for Muttersterben

Michael Lentz (born 1964) is a German author, musician, and performer of experimental texts and sound poetry.

== Life ==
Lentz was born in Düren. His father Hubert Lentz (1927–2014) was city manager (Oberstadtdirektor) of Düren. Lentz completed his Abitur at the Stiftisches Gymnasium Düren in 1983 and studied German studies, history and philosophy in Aachen and Munich. He completed his PhD in 1999; the thesis was titled Lautpoesie, -musik nach 1945 (Sound Poetry, Music After 1945). Lentz was student of Josef Anton Riedl and saxophonist in Riedl's Ensemble. He was the winner of the 2001 Ingeborg Bachmann Prize for his book Muttersterben. In May 2006, he was appointed professor for literary writing at the German Literature Institute, University of Leipzig. The genres of his work are poems, plays, radio plays, short stories and novels.

Lentz is friends with the musician Herbert Grönemeyer and published a book about him in 2024.

In 2025, an English-language edition of Schattenfroh, translated by Max Lawton, was published.

Lentz lives in Berlin and has a second home in Leipzig. He lived in Munich for several years.

== Awards ==
- 2001 Ingeborg Bachmann Prize for Muttersterben
- 2005 Preis der Literaturhäuser
- 2012 Walter-Hasenclever-Literaturpreis

=== Memberships ===
- 2014 Deutsche Akademie für Sprache und Dichtung, Darmstadt

== Works ==
- Lentz, Michael (2002). Muttersterben : Prosa (in German). Frankfurt am Main: S. Fischer. ISBN 3-10-044810-3. OCLC 49197516.
- —— (2003). Liebeserklärung : Roman (in German). Frankfurt am Main: S. Fischer. ISBN 3-10-043923-6. OCLC 53098619.
- —— (2007). Pazifik Exil : Roman (in German). Frankfurt am Main: S. Fischer. ISBN 978-3-10-043925-3. OCLC 166334124.
- —— (2018). Schattenfroh : Ein Requiem (in German). Frankfurt am Main: S. Fischer. ISBN 978-3-10-043938-3. OCLC 1033644155.
- —— (2020). Innehaben : Schattenfroh und die Bilder (in German). Frankfurt: S. Fischer. ISBN 978-3-10-390006-4. OCLC 1226678308.
- —— (2023). Chora : Gedichte (in German). Frankfurt: S. Fischer. ISBN 978-3-10-390012-5.
- —— (2024). Heimwärts : Roman (in German). Frankfurt: S. Fischer. ISBN 978-3-10-397518-5.
- —— (2024). Grönemeyer (in German). Frankfurt: S. Fischer. ISBN 978-3-10-397585-7.

=== Thesis ===
- Lentz, Michael (2000). Lautpoesie, -musik nach 1945 Bd. 2 (in German). Wien: Ed. Selene. ISBN 978-3-10-043936-9. OCLC 313700605.
