= Schattenfroh =

2018 novel by Michael Lentz

Schattenfroh: A Requiem
- Author: Michael Lentz
- Original title: Schattenfroh: Ein Requiem
- Translator: Max Lawton
- Language: German
- Publisher: S. Fischer Verlag, Deep Vellum (US)
- Publication date: September 2018
- Publication place: Germany
- English publication date: September 2025
- Media type: Print
- Pages: 1008
- ISBN: 978-3100439383

Schattenfroh is a 2018 novel by German author Michael Lentz. It was praised by reviewers, and an English translation was published in 2025.

== Contents ==
Schattenfroh is structured as a transcript of the thoughts of Nobody, a man confined to a dark room by an organization called the Frightbearing Society. He is made to view a stream of images via a mask on his head, controlled by Schattenfroh, a demonic representative of the Frightbearing Society. Throughout the novel, Nobody travels through various points in German history.

== Reception ==
Schattenfroh was widely praised by reviewers. Josh Billings in the Los Angeles Review of Books points to Schattenfroh's confrontation of what lies beyond language and storytelling as the area in which it most shines. Dustin Illingworth of the New York Times commended the book, calling it "one of the great, and greatly demanding, literary pleasures of the year". Jonathan Russell Clark writing for the Washington Post called it "a refreshing immersion", touching on universal topics while being distinct from typical works.

An English translation by Max Lawton was published in 2025 by Deep Vellum. Lawton's translation was praised by Anahid Nersessian in the New York Review for "capturing the propulsive energy of the original text without sacrificing its difficulty". She also notes its preservation of several High German phrases, the language being critical to the novel's story.
