= Tatyana Tolstaya =

Russian writer (born 1951)

- Татьяна Толстая
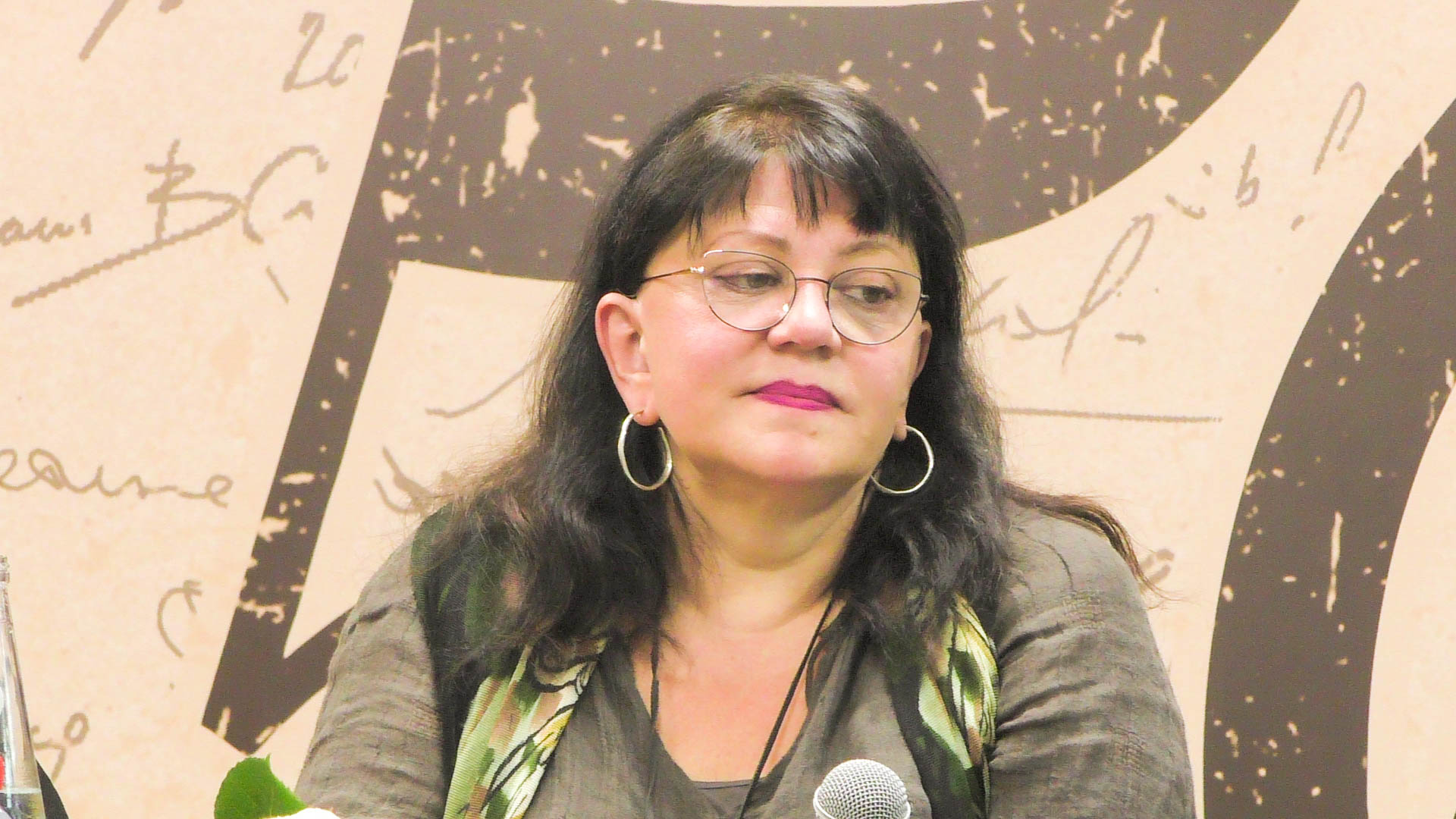
- Tolstaya in 2017
- Born: 3 May 1951 (age 75); Leningrad, Russian SFSR, Soviet Union
- Education: Saint Petersburg State University
- Occupations: Writer; TV host; publicist; novelist; essayist

Tatyana Nikitichna Tolstaya (Russian: Татьяна Никитична Толстая; born 3 May 1951) is a Russian writer, TV host, publicist, novelist, and essayist from the Tolstoy family.

== Family ==
Tolstaya was born in Leningrad into a family of writers. Her paternal grandfather, Aleksei Nikolaevich Tolstoy, was a pioneering science fiction writer, and the son of Count Nikolay Alexandrovich Tolstoy (1849–1900) and Alexandra Leontievna Turgeneva (1854–1906), a relative of Decembrist Nikolay Turgenev and the writer Ivan Turgenev. Tolstaya's paternal grandmother was the poet Natalia Krandievskaya. Mikhail Lozinsky (1886-1955), her maternal grandfather, was a literary translator renowned for his translation of Dante's The Divine Comedy. Tolstaya's sister, Natalia was a writer as well. Her son, Artemy Lebedev, is the founder-owner of Art. Lebedev Studio, a Russian web design firm.

== Life and work ==
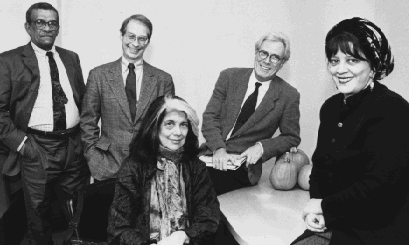
From right: Tatyana Tolstaya; Mark Strand; Susan Sontag; Richard Locke, chairman of the School of the Arts Writing Division, and Derek Walcott

=== 1951—1983: early years ===
Tatiana Tolstaya was born in Leningrad to a physicist professor Nikita Alekseyevich Tolstoy and Natalya Mikhailovna Lozinskaya. With six siblings, she grew up in the First Apartment house of Lensovet.

In 1974, Tolstaya graduated from the department of classical philology of the Leningrad State University. In the same year, she married a philologist Andrey Lebedev. The couple moved to Moscow in the early 1980s, where Tolstaya started working in the Nauka publishing house.

As recalled by Tolstaya, in November 1982 she underwent an operation on her eyes and had to spend three months in rehabilitation, unable to see in the bright light. She believes that period brought her into writing: without a constant flow of information from the world, her mind cleared and she discovered in herself a desire to write down plots and stories.

=== 1983—1989: start of literary career ===
In 1983, Tolstaya emerged as a literary critic.

Her first short story, On the Golden Porch (На золотом крыльце сидели), appeared in Avrora magazine in 1983 and marked the start of Tolstaya's literary career, and her story collection of the same name established Tolstaya as one of the foremost writers of the perestroika and post-Soviet period. As Michiko Kakutani writes, "one can find echoes...of her great-granduncle Leo Tolstoy's work - his love of nature, his psychological insight, his attention to the details of everyday life". But "her luminous, haunting stories most insistently recall the work of Chekhov, mapping characters' inner lives and unfulfilled dreams with uncommon sympathy and insight", and also display "the author's Nabokovian love of language and her affinity for strange excursions into the surreal, reminiscent of Bulgakov and Gogol." In 1987, a collection of short stories under the same title — "On the Golden Porch" — was translated into English and received positive reviews. When in 1988 the book was released in Russia, more than 50,000 copies were sold out in hours. She was a visiting professor teaching Russian Literature at the University of Texas at Austin in 1989.

=== 1990—1999: life in the USA and journalism ===
In 1990, Tolstaya with her family emigrated to the United States. She began teaching Russian literature and creative writing first at Princeton, then at Skidmore College, and gave lectures in multiple universities. She also emerged as a journalist and contributed to the New York Review of Books, The New Yorker, TLS, the Wilson Quarterly, and also wrote for Russia-based editions such as the Moscow News, the Capital and Russian Telegraph.

In 1988, Tatyana and her sister Natalya co-authored a book of short stories which was released under the title Sisters.

=== 2000—2012: The Slynx, The School for Scandal, speechwriting ===
In the early 1990s Tolstaya worked in speechwriting for the Union of Right Forces party along with screenwriter and journalist Dunya Smirnova and literary critic Alexander Timopheevsky.

In 1999, Tolstaya moved back to Russia. The next year she released her novel The Slynx (Кысь), a dystopian vision of post-nuclear Russian life in what was once (now forgotten) Moscow, presenting a negative Bildungsroman that in part confronts "disappointments of post-Soviet Russian political and social life". It has been described as "an account of a degraded world that is full of echoes of the sublime literature of Russia’s past; a grinning portrait of human inhumanity; a tribute to art in both its sovereignty and its helplessness; a vision of the past as the future in which the future is now". As confessed by the writer, it took her more than 14 years to compose the novel. By 2003, more than 200,000 copies of The Slynx were sold.

Soon after the release of The Slynx, three more books of Tolstaya were published. Two collections of short stories under the titles “Day” and “Night” were followed by the Two, co-authored with her sister Natalya.

For the twelve years between 2002 and 2014, with her friend Avdotya Smirnova Tolstaya co-hosted a Russian cultural television programme, The School for Scandal (Школа злословия, named after Richard Sheridan's play), on which she conducted interviews with diverse representatives of contemporary Russian culture and politics. In 2003, The School for Scandal was awarded Best Talk Show prize by the Russian National Television.

In 2010, with her niece Olga Prokhorova Tolstaya released The Same ABC of Buratino — a collection of poems that should have been inside the book that Buratino had sold away. In an interview to a Russian magazine Tolstaya confessed that she had nurtured the idea of this book since childhood, but only when her children grew up her niece ‘picked up’ the project and helped to write the book.

=== After 2013 ===
On June 12, 2015, The New Yorker published The Square, a dark homage to the nothingness of Kazimir Malevich's 1915 painting, Black Square, which concludes with a self-referential paragraph.

In 2018, a collection of short stories under the title Aetherial Worlds was released in Russia. Written in a playful and poetic language, the stories are a mixture of real and fictional recollections of her childhood, her travels and family. The book was awarded the Ivan Belkin Literary Award. Soon it was translated into English and received positive acclaims.

In 2020, she was awarded the Writer of the Year prize. This award honours prolific writers for their long time contribution to Russian literature.

== Bibliography ==
=== Novels ===
- Tolstaya, Tatyana (2003). The slynx. Translated by Jamey Gambrell. Boston: Houghton Mifflin.
  - The slynx. Translated by Jamey Gambrell (Pbk ed.). New York: New York Review Books. 2003.

=== Short fiction ===
Collections

- Tolstaya, Tatyana (1989). On the golden porch. Translated by Antonina W. Bouis. New York: Knopf.
  - On the golden porch. Reprint. Translated by Antonina W. Bouis. New York: Vintage. 1990 [1989].
  - On the golden porch and other stories. Reprint. Translated by Antonina W. Bouis. Penguin. 1990 [1989].
- — (1992). Sleepwalker in a fog. Translated by Jamey Gambrell. New York: Knopf.
  - Sleepwalker in a fog. Translated by Jamey Gambrell (1st international ed.). New York: Vintage. 1993 [1992].
- — (2007). White walls : collected stories. Translated by Antonina W. Bouis; Jamey Gambrell. New York: New York Review Books.
- — (2018). Aetherial worlds : stories. Translated by Anya Migdal. New York: Knopf.

Stories

Title	Year	First published	Reprinted/collected	Notes
The poet and the muse	1990	Tolstaya, Tatyana (8 January 1990). "The poet and the muse". The New Yorker.		
Heavenly flame	1990	Tolstaya, Tatyana (8 October 1990). "Heavenly flame". The New Yorker. Translated by Jamey Gambrell.		
Most beloved	1991	Tolstaya, Tatyana (4 March 1991). "Most beloved". The New Yorker. Translated by Jamey Gambrell.		
Night	1991	Tolstaya, Tatyana (Spring 1991). "Night". The Paris Review. 118.		
White walls	2000	Tolstaya, Tatyana (17 January 2000). "White walls". The New Yorker. Translated by Jamey Gambrell.		
See the other side	2007	Tolstaya, Tatyana (12 March 2007). "See the other side". The New Yorker. 83. Translated by Jamey Gambrell.		
Aspic	2016	Tolstaya, Tatyana (25 January 2016). "Aspic". The New Yorker. 91 (45). Translated by Anya Migdal: 59.		
Unnecessary things	2017	Tolstaya, Tatyana (9 August 2017). "Unnecessary things". The New Yorker. Translated by Anya Migdal.		

=== Non-fiction ===
- Tolstaya, Tatyana (1992). "Is there hope for Pushkin's children?" (PDF). Wilson Quarterly. 16.
- — (29 February 1996). "On Joseph Brodsky". The New York Review of Books.
- — (28 December 1998). "The snow collectors". The New Yorker. Translated by Jamey Gambrell.
- — (25 May 2000). "The making of Mr Putin". The New York Review of Books. Translated by Jamey Gambrell.
- — (20 September 2000). "Of saints and servants". Project Syndicate. Translated by Anya Migdal.
- — (2003). Pushkin's children : writings on Russia and Russians. Boston and New York: Houghton Mifflin.
- — (26 December 2005). "Yorick : uncovering the bones of a grandmother's past". Personal History. The New Yorker. 81 (41).
- — (22–29 December 2014). "Bus stop". Inner Worlds. The New Yorker. 90 (41). Translated by Jamey Gambrell: 123.
- — (28 December 2014). "The beauty, the journalist, and the Titanic". BBC Magazine.
- — (12 June 2015). "The square". Cultural Comment. The New Yorker. Translated by Anya Migdal. (Note: Available on website only.)
- — (21 June 2015). "Father". Cultural Comment. The New Yorker. Translated by Anya Migdal.

———————
