= Natalia Tolstaya =

Russian writer and translator

Natalia Nikitichna Tolstaya (Russian: Наталья Никитична Толстая; May 2, 1943, Yelabuga, Tatar ASSR – June 15, 2010, Saint Petersburg) was a Russian writer and translator from the Tolstoy family. She was a granddaughter of writer Alexei Tolstoy and poet Mikhail Lozinsky, and sister of the writer Tatyana Tolstaya. She was married to Alex de Souza. She taught for many years at Saint Petersburg State University, from which she had also graduated. Tolstaya's specialty was Scandinavian languages, and she had written her first stories in Swedish before turning to Russian. In 2004 she was awarded the Order of the Polar Star by the Swedish government for her efforts in fostering better relations between Russia and Sweden. She was known in scientific circles primarily as a strong Scandinavian philologist, with a focus on Swedish language and Russian-Swedish cultural relations. Until her death in 2010, she worked together with her sister to create a collection of short stories called "Sisters" and was regularly published in the literary journal Zvezda.
