= Jamey Gambrell =

American translator (1954–2020)

- Born: April 10, 1954; Manhattan, New York
- Died: February 15, 2020 (aged 65); Manhattan, New York
- Education: University of Texas at Austin
- Occupation: Translator
- Writing career
- Language: Russian–English
- Notable work: The Day of the Oprichnik by Vladimir Sorokin

Jamey Gambrell (April 10, 1954 – February 15, 2020) was an American translator of Russian literature, and an expert in modern art. She was an editor with the Art in America magazine, and was a winner of the Thornton Wilder Prize for Translation of the American Academy of Arts and Letters.

== Life ==
Gambrell was born in Manhattan on April 10, 1954. Her mother, Helen Roddy, was a teacher, and her father, James Gambrell III, was a professor of law. She had two siblings, a sister and a brother.

Gambrell attended the Elisabeth Irwin High School. She received an undergraduate degree from the University of Texas at Austin, where her thesis was on Anna Akhmatova. She studied at the Sorbonne and obtained a master's degree from Columbia University in Russian studies.

In the 1980s and 1990s, she lived in Moscow, where she took part in the newly rising underground art scene. There she also adopted her daughter, Calla.

Gambrell died in Manhattan on February 15, 2020, after suffering from cancer.

== Career ==
=== Literary ===
Gambrell's first publication was a translated article on the Soviet-Afghan war by Artyom Borovik, which appeared in the magazine Life in 1980.

In the early 1980s, Gambrell was offered the diaries of Marina Tsvetaeva by Alexander Sumerkin, Joseph Brodsky's literary secretary. Her translation of portions of it was appreciated by Susan Sontag, who arranged for their publication in the magazine Partisan Review.

Gambrell's first published translated book was of Tatyana Tolstaya's Sleepwalker in a Fog, which appeared in 1992. Her translation was thought to capture the urgent and hyperreal quality of the original. She translated other works by Tolstaya, as well as several books by Vladimir Sorokin. Her translation of Sorokin's Ice (2007) was lauded for its hard-boiled rendition of the novel's brutal cadences. Other critics have found her translations to be as elegant, playful and layered as the originals. In 2002, she published her complete translation of Marina Tsvetaeva's Earthly Signs: Moscow Diaries, 1917-1922.

=== Art criticism ===
Gambrell covered the modern art of the late Soviet period as part of her editorship and critiques for the magazine Art in America. As its reporter she first visited Moscow in 1985. She translated articles by the conceptual artists Alexander Melamid and Vitaly Komar, and worked as their interpreter.

In 1988, Sotheby's held a big auction of Russian art in Moscow, Russian Avant-Garde and Soviet Contemporary Art. Barbara Herbich's film USSaRt documented the proceedings, for which Gambrell interviewed the participating artists.

== Selected translations ==
- Tatyana Tolstaya (1992). Sleepwalker in a Fog: Stories. Knopf. ISBN 978-0394587318.
- Marina Tsvetaeva (2002). Earthly Signs: Moscow Diaries, 1917-1922. Yale University. ISBN 978-0300069228.
- Aleksandr Rodchenko (2004). Aleksandr Rodchenko: Experiments for the Future, Diaries, Essays, Letters, and Other Writings. New York: The Museum of Modern Art. ISBN 978-0870705465.
- Vladimir Sorokin (2011). Ice Trilogy. NYRB Classics. ISBN 978-1590173862.
- Vladimir Sorokin (2011). The Day of the Oprichnik. Farrar, Straus and Giroux. ISBN 978-0374134754.
- Leonid Tsypkin (2013). The Bridge Over the Neroch: And Other Works. New Directions. ISBN 978-0811216616.
