= Locos =

Novel by Felipe Alfau

Locos: A Comedy of Gestures is the first novel of Spanish-born American writer Felipe Alfau (1902–1999), written in 1928 and published in 1936. The metafictional novel remained out of print until 1988 when it was reprinted by Dalkey Archive Press; its positive reception then led to the publication of Alfau's second novel Chromos in 1990, which he had written in 1948.

== Synopsis ==
The book consists of eight independent but interrelated short stories that the author states can be read in any order. In the introduction, Alfau thanks his characters "for their anarchic collaboration"—in the stories the characters and narrator often interact.

=== Contents ===
1. "Identity"
2. "A Character"
3. "The Beggar"
4. "Fingerprints"
5. "The Wallet"
6. "Chinelato"
  I "The Ogre"
  II "The Black Mandarin"
  III "Tia Mariquita"
7. "The Necrophil"
8. "A Romance of Dogs"
  I "Students"
  II "Spring"

== Background ==
Felipe Alfau was born and grew up in Spain. In 1916, the 14-year-old Alfau moved with his family to New York. He had ambitions to become a music conductor and wrote music criticism for El Diario La Prensa. By the late 1920s he had a wife and daughter and hoped to support them with his writing; he wrote Locos about 1928, and in 1929 he had a children's book Old Tales from Spain published. He had considerable difficulty finding a publisher for Locos.

== Publication and reception ==
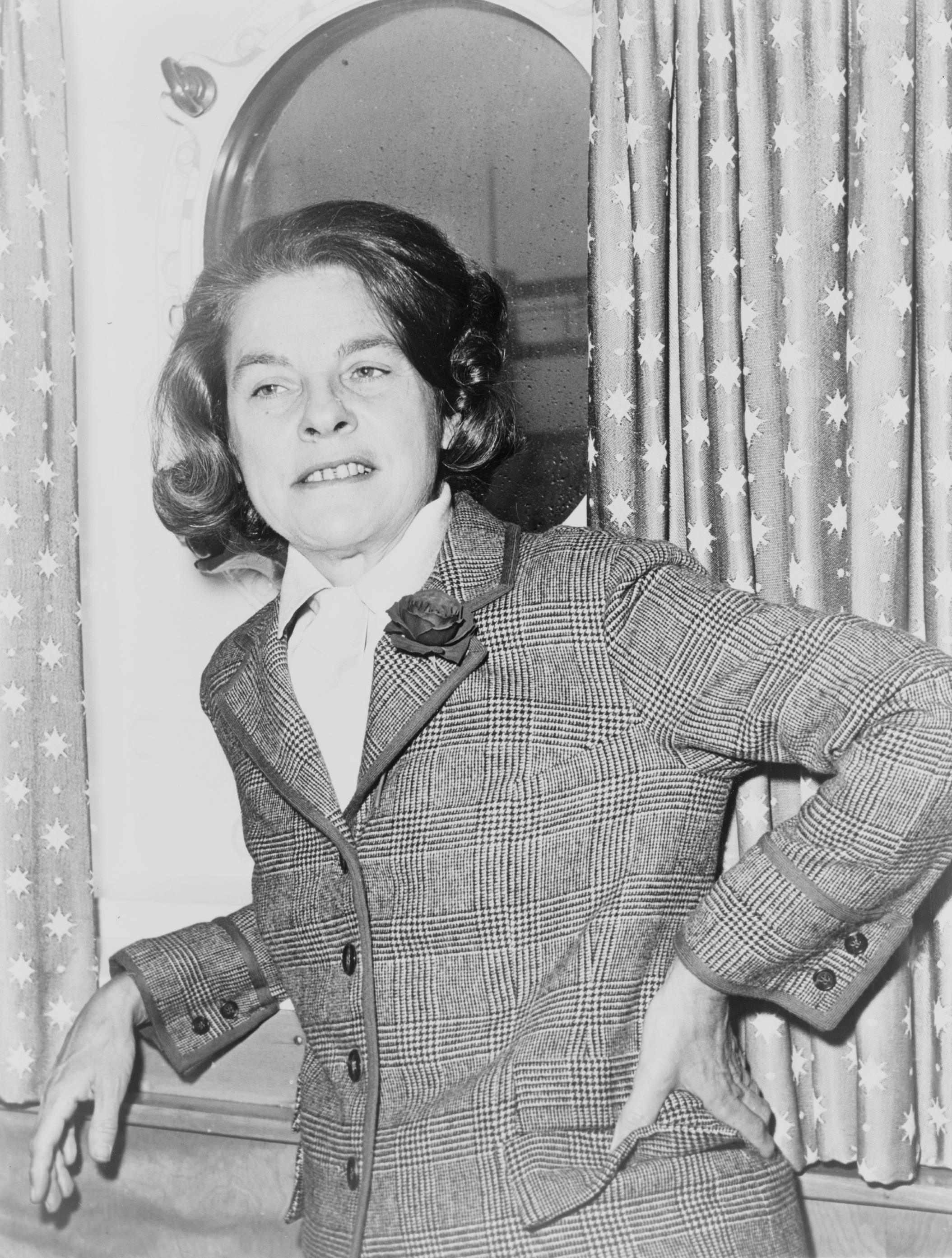
Mary McCarthy reviewed Locos on its publication in 1936 and the afterword to its republication in 1988.

Farrar & Rinehart first published the book in 1936; Alfau received $250 for the manuscript. The edition was priced $2.50 and was the first in an intended series of signed editions sold by subscription. The book had a positive critical reception, including a review by writer Mary McCarthy, and quickly disappeared. The book then stayed out of print until editor Steven Moore introduced it to Dalkey Archive Press, which reprinted it in 1988 with an afterword by McCarthy.

Alfau said he was "bemused" with the attention the book received late in his life, but remarked it would have interested him more if it had come when he was younger.

Comics writer Harvey Pekar wrote a one-page comic strip entitled "Felipe Alfau" (1993), illustrated by Joe Sacco, in which he recounts discovering a first-edition copy of Locos; in the original draft of the script he compares the work to those of O'Brien, Queneau, and Cervantes.

== Legacy ==
Alfau's techniques are seen as anticipating those in the works of later-generation postmodern writers such as Barth, Calvino, Nabokov, Pynchon, O'Brien, and Borges. McCarthy described the attraction of the book to her as "the modernist novel as detective story", and later compared it to Nabokov's Pale Fire (1962). Comparable works that preceded Alfau's include Pirandello's play Six Characters in Search of an Author (1921) and works by Unamuno in the mid-1920s.

The idea of characters taking on a life independent from their author's intention reappears in Gilbert Sorrentino's Mulligan Stew (1979) and Desmond MacNamara's The Book of Intrusions (1994).

A chapter appeared in the 2011 Norton Anthology of Latino Literature.
