= The Tunnel (Gass novel) =

1995 novel by William H. Gass

- First edition cover
- Author: William H. Gass
- Language: English
- Genre: Postmodern, Metafiction
- Publisher: Knopf
- Publication date: February 21, 1995
- Publication place: United States
- Media type: Print (hardback & paperback)
- Pages: 652 (depending on edition)
- ISBN: 978-0-06-097686-6
- OCLC: 33403165

The Tunnel is a 1995 novel by the American author William H. Gass. The novel took 26 years to write and earned him the American Book Award of 1996, and was also a finalist for the PEN/Faulkner award.

The Tunnel is the story of William Frederick Kohler, a professor of history at an unnamed university in the American Midwest. Kohler's introduction to his major work on World War II, Guilt and Innocence in Hitler's Germany, the culmination of his years studying the aspects of the Nazi regime in the scope of its causes and effects, turns into The Tunnel, a brutally honest and subjective depiction of his own life and history and the opposite of the well-argued, researched and objective book he has just completed. When the harsh reality of his work begins to dawn on him, he fears that his wife, Martha, will stumble onto his papers and read his most personal (and cruel) descriptions of his and their life. Because of this fear, he hides the pages of The Tunnel inside of Guilt and Innocence in Hitler's Germany. During this time, he starts to dig a tunnel underneath the basement of his home, eventually hiding the dirt inside the drawers of his wife's collection of antique furniture.

In 2006 Dalkey Archive Press released an audiobook of the complete novel read by the author (in 2005 in St. Louis). The accompanying booklet prints Gass's overview of the novel's contents, structure, plot, "condition of the text", aim, cast, levels of organization, issues, and other matters.

== Plot summary ==
The Tunnel's 652 pages are divided into twelve main sections. In a 1995 radio interview at KCRW with Michael Silverblatt, Gass stated that the difficulty of the novel's early sections, which are introduced by a quote from Anaxagoras ("The descent to hell is the same from every place"), serves as both a false beginning to The Tunnel (the introduction Kohler is writing and his digging project) and as a test for the reader: "I think this is a standard modernist thing, but what it is is to make sure that the person who gets into the book is ready and deserves to be there. It's a kind of a test of competency [...] It's also, I think, essential, to, fairly early, establish the kind of range of reference, of demand, that the book is going to make of the reader. I think that's just fair."

=== 1. Life in a Chair ===
Kohler introduces the reader to his scholarly work on the Germans, and contemplates the implications of spending the majority of his working life in a chair. The chair he occupies in the novel belonged to his mentor, the German history professor and Nazi collaborator Magus Tabor. Gass uses quite a bit of typographical variety in this section (a window and a Star of David, both constructed out of text, are notable examples) and includes pictures, drawings and watermarks.

=== 2. Koh Whistles Up a Wind ===
Section two begins with a compilation of excuses from Kohler's university students, then segues into a contemplation of the Muse. This leads Kohler to list his literary preferences, a litany that includes Proust, Mann, Lawrence and Rilke. These reflections trigger Kohler to recall a childhood walk to Market Street, which then leads him to an examination of the literary tastes of his youth. The section ends with a long introduction of Kohler's mentor, Magus "Mad Meg" Tabor, which alternates from the professor's lectures to the narrator's memories of the man.

=== 3. We Have Not Lived the Right Life ===
Kohler reflects on his life, interspersing childhood memories with descriptions of his house. The character of Uncle Balt, a tall, sonorous farmer whose folksy pronouncements ("THEY'LL MAKE YOU INTO MAN JAM AND SERVE YOU ON TOAST") Kohler records and contemplates. This section also contains a visit to Kohler's university office, and the first extended passage concerning the narrator's parents.

=== 4. Today I Began to Dig ===
Kohler begins work on his tunnel, breaking through his basement's cement floor to a layer of cobbles. He describes his workspace, and meditates on his marriage, his book, and his colleagues, specifically Culp, an inveterate dirty limerick writer and the leader of Kohler's sons' boy scout troop. Gass includes many of Culp's limericks (he's trying to write a history of the world using the form) and also brings back a few of the typographical inventions (a page designed to look like a paper sack; business cards) that dominated the novel's earlier sections.

=== 5. Mad Meg ===
The section mainly concerns itself with Kohler's recollections of his history professor, Tabor: his lectures, his conversational style, his philosophical influences and ideas, his illness and eventual demise. Gass inserts childhood memories of Sunday drives and family life, along with a brief memory of Kohler's military service. Gass also introduces the Party of Disappointed People, a fictional political party that Kohler invented (he claims Mad Meg is the spiritual founder). Kohler has created not just an entire ideology, but flags, logos and symbols. The PdP recurs as a motif throughout the book.

=== 6. Why Windows Are Important to Me ===
Kohler meditates on windows of various sorts throughout the book's sixth section. Kohler continues to reflect on his colleagues, his teacher Meg, his family life and his professional work on the Holocaust. A subsection, titled "Blackboard," contains Kohler's thoughts on classrooms, teaching, and students. Another subsection, "Kristallnacht" recalls Kohler's time in Germany as a student - he was present during the Kristallnacht, but his participation in the actual event is ambiguous.

=== 7. The First Winter of My Married Life ===
Kohler chronicles scenes from his early married life with Martha. They live in university-provided apartments, and, because of the thinness of the complex's walls, are able to study the daily habits of a couple living next to them. Kohler looks through a family album, lingering on portraits of his mother and father. He records a harrowing scene from early life as a father, when he is violent towards his young son while failing to stop him from crying. The section ends with Kohler contemplating his penis, which he does often throughout the novel.

=== 8. The Curse of Colleagues ===
Kohler describes all of his colleagues in the department of history: the chair, Oscar Planmantee, who has a problem with one of Kohler's graduate students; Walter Hershel, an old fashioned and mild-mannered scholar; Tommasso Governali, a rising star who has an unruly and defiant teenage daughter; and Charles Culp, writer of obscene limericks. The Department of History is meeting to address a female student's complaints about Kohler's sexual advances.

=== 9. Around the House ===
Kohler goes through a lengthy morning ritual, meditating on a variety of subjects as he prepares to write. His thoughts drift to Adolf Hitler, a central figure in Kohler's scholarly work. The Vietnam War is briefly mentioned, which is one of the novel's few references to the time period in which the present action of the novel takes place.

=== 10. Susu, I Approach You in My Dreams ===
Kohler invokes a youthful paramour, Susu, a gypsy lounge singer who committed atrocities against the Jews during World War II and was eventually executed by the Nazis. While digging his tunnel, Martha's cat surprises him, and Kohler instinctively strangles her. He buries the cat in one of Martha's wardrobes. Koehler recalls a 2nd instance of his mother thinking she lost her rings while on a family vacation. Kohler recollects his father's attempts to teach him how to drive, as well as his bigoted reaction to foreigners (he dubs the head of the family "Mr. Toottoot") moving next door.

=== 11. Going to the River ===
Kohler recalls an extended affair with Lou, a shopgirl and part-time student at his university. This section also contains a long, descriptive childhood recollection, focusing on a young Kohler's infatuation with candy, as well as a brief dalliance with gambling addiction.

=== 12. Outcast on the Mountains of the Heart ===
The last section of the book primarily concerns itself with character sketches of Kohler's mother, father, and aunt. Kohler, at the young age of twelve, has to deal with his father's crippling arthritis, and his mother's dissolution from alcohol addiction. Kohler reveals his childhood disillusionment led him to reject poetry for the study of history.

== Characters ==
- William Frederick Kohler
- Martha Kohler
- Carl Kohler
- Adolf Kohler
- Margaret Phelps Kohler (Feeney/Finney)
- Frederick Karl Kohler
- Uncle Balt
- Auntie
- Gran
- Magus Tabor
- Charles Culp
- Tomasso Governali
- Walter Henry Herschel
- Oscar Planmantee
- Larry Lacelli
- Susu
- Lou
- Ruth/Rue

== Publication history ==
The novel was originally contracted to Boston publisher Ticknor and Fields, but they changed their mind upon the book's completion in 1993. Dalkey Archive Press asked to publish it, but Gass's agent sold it instead to Knopf. After they let it go out of print a few years later, Dalkey reissued it in paperback. During its long gestation, sections of the novel appeared in various literary journals and magazines prior to the novel's publication.

- “We Have Not Lived the Right Life” (New American Review, 1969)
- “The Cost of Everything” (Fiction, 1972)
- “Mad Meg” (Iowa Review, 1976)
- “Koh Whistles Up a Wind” (Tri-Quarterly, 1977)
- “Susu, I Approach You in My Dreams” (Tri-Quarterly, 1978)
- “August Bees” (Delta, 1979)
- “The First Winter of My Married Life” (Granta, Spring 1979; New Territory: Contemporary Indiana Fiction, 1990)
- “The Old Folks” (Best American Short Stories, 1980)
- “Why Windows are Important to Me” (Tri-Quarterly, 1982)
- “Uncle Balt and the Nature of Being” (The Pushcart Prize, 1982)
- “Culp” (Grand Street, Summer 1984)
- “The Sunday Drive” (Esquire, August 1984)
- “Family Album” (River Styx, 1986)
- "Sweets" (Review of Contemporary Fiction, Fall 1991)
- "Sweet Things" (Harper's, February 1992)

== Critical reception ==
Gass received the American Book Award for The Tunnel in 1996. Steven Moore claimed that it was "a stupendous achievement and obviously one of the greatest novels of the century." Michael Silverblatt of the Los Angeles Times wrote in his review of the novel: "A bleak, black book, it engenders awe and despair. I have read it in its entirety 4½ times, each time finding its resonance and beauty so great as to demand another reading. As I read, I found myself devastated by the thoroughness of the book's annihilating sensibility and revived by the beauty of its language, the complexity of its design, the melancholy, horror and stoic sympathy in its rendering of what we used to call the human condition." In his review of the novel in the New York Times Christopher Lehmann-Haupt wrote: "So why, given the considerable grimness of The Tunnel, does the reader still track its endless coils of prose? For the lyrical set pieces, for one thing; the haunting evocations of a small-town childhood so sensually rich in detail that the prose is sometimes hypnotic. But more compelling still is the tension Mr. Gass has created between literary art for its own sake and transcendent psychological truth."

Robert Alter in his review of the book in The New Republic wrote: "Some may seize on it as a postmodern masterpiece, but it is a bloated monster of a book. [...] The bloat is a consequence of sheer adipose verbosity and an unremitting condition of moral and intellectual flatulence. [...] The abjection of (Gass') hero seems less lived than written. It is an act of ventriloquism: behind the repulsive, potentially fascist narrator stands his critic, the novelist, presumably committed to humane, democratic values. But those values are nowhere intimated in the book, and what emerges is a kind of inadvertent complicity between author and protagonist. The supposedly critical novel becomes an enactment of bad faith." Robert Kelly wrote in the New York Times Book Review that "[i]t will be years before we know what to make of it."

Three years after publication of the novel, Steven G. Kellman and Irving Malin published a collection of critical essays entitled Into "The Tunnel": Readings of Gass's Novel (University of Delaware Press, 1998), which includes an interview with Gass.
