= Review of Contemporary Fiction =

American review journal

- Founder: John O'Brien
- Founded: 1980
- Country: United States
- Website: http://www.dalkeyarchive.com

The Review of Contemporary Fiction is a triannual journal published by Dalkey Archive Press. It features a variety of fiction, reviews and critical essays, with an emphasis on literature with an experimental, avant-garde or subversive bent. Founded in 1980 by the publisher John O'Brien, the Review of Contemporary Fiction originally focused upon American and British writers who had been overlooked by the critical establishment, and in this manner the Review succeeded in bringing new critical attention to writers such as William Gaddis, Gilbert Sorrentino, Paul Metcalf, Nicholas Mosley, Donald Barthelme, and many others. In 1984, in order to begin reprinting some of these authors, John O'Brien founded Dalkey Archive Press.

Over the past few decades, both the Review and Dalkey Archive have widened their focus to include works in translation, especially from countries without a strong presence in global literature. Examples of significant international issues of the Review include Slovak Fiction (30.2), New Catalan Fiction (28.1), and New Latvian Fiction (18.1). One of the final issues was on Moldovan Fiction (34.2).

The Review has featured essays and reviews from some of the most well-known writers of today, including Jonathan Franzen, David Foster Wallace, Jonathan Safran Foer, Kathy Acker, Barbara Guest and Jonathan Lethem. At the center of the Review is the notion that authors should write about other authors, instead of leaving it to critics or academics. When asked why he started the Review of Contemporary Fiction, John O'Brien responded:

I started the Review out of a sense of isolation, as well as a kind of outrage at the fact that books and authors were reduced only to marketplace value. And I should say that, from the start, I wanted the magazine to break down the artificial barriers that exist among countries and cultures. It was my view then and now that one can't properly come to terms with contemporary writing without seeing it in an international context, and it's also my view that Americans generally don't want to know anything about the world outside the United States unless they are planning a vacation.

The Review ceased publication in 2016.

Significant contributors to the Review include:

- Kathy Acker
- Diane Ackerman
- John Ashbery
- John Barth
- S. D. Chrostowska
- Robert Coover
- Robert Creeley
- Guy Davenport
- Helen DeWitt
- Rikki Ducornet
- Stanley Elkin
- Jonathan Safran Foer
- Jonathan Franzen
- William Gass
- Barbara Guest
- Dermot Healy
- Aidan Higgins
- Travis Jeppesen
- Kenneth Koch
- Milan Kundera
- Jonathan Lethem
- David Markson
- Paul Metcalf
- China Miéville
- Patrick Modiano
- Steven Moore
- Nicholas Mosley
- Ann Pancake
- Marjorie Perloff
- Robert Pinget
- John Rechy
- Alain Robbe-Grillet
- Hubert Selby
- Michael Silverblatt
- Gilbert Sorrentino
- William T. Vollmann
- Kurt Vonnegut
- David Foster Wallace
- Curtis White
- John E. Woods
