= The English Understand Wool =

2022 novella by Helen DeWitt

- First edition
- Author: Helen DeWitt
- Language: English
- Publisher: New Directions

The English Understand Wool is a 2022 novella by American author Helen DeWitt. The novella was published by New Directions.

== Publication and release ==
DeWitt announced the upcoming publication of the novella on her Twitter account in November 2021. The novella was published as part of a new series from New Directions, "Storybook ND", which aims to deliver "the pleasure one felt as a child reading a marvelous book from cover to cover in an afternoon."

A Wayne Thiebaud painting titled Boston Cremes appears on the book's cover. Books in the "Storybook ND" series were designed by Peter Mendelsund.

== Reception ==
In a review published by The Wall Street Journal, Sam Sacks praised the novella as "delicious". Sacks further wrote that DeWitt, "With an impeccably straight face" manages to direct "superb satirical shots at the publishing industry" through the central character, Marguerite. Publishers Weekly praised the book, writing that DeWitt was "at the top of her game" and that it presented an "explosive rebuke to sensationalistic American publishing".

Reviews published by The Brooklyn Rail and The Millions observed similarities between the protagonist of The English Understand Wool and the protagonist of DeWitt's novel The Last Samurai, Ludo.
