= Alexander Theroux =

American novelist and poet

- Born: Alexander Louis Theroux; 1939 (age 86–87); Medford, Massachusetts, U.S.
- Education: University of Virginia
- Occupations: Author; poet; academic
- Relatives: Paul Theroux (brother); Peter Theroux (brother); Louis Theroux (nephew); Marcel Theroux (nephew); Justin Theroux (nephew)
- Writing career
- Period: 1972–present
- Notable work: Darconville's Cat (1981)

Alexander Louis Theroux (born 1939) is an American novelist and poet. He is known for his novel Darconville's Cat (1981), which was selected by Anthony Burgess for his book-length essay Ninety-Nine Novels: The Best in English Since 1939 – A Personal Choice in 1984 and by Larry McCaffery for his 20th Century's Greatest Hits list.

He was awarded the Lannan Literary Award for Fiction in 1991 and the Clifton Fadiman Medal for Fiction in 2002 by the Mercantile Library in New York City. He is the brother of novelist Paul Theroux and writer/translator Peter Theroux as well as the uncle of documentarian Louis Theroux, novelist Marcel Theroux, and actor Justin Theroux.

== Early life ==
Theroux was born in Medford, Massachusetts, the first son of Catholic parents; his mother, Anne (born Dittami), was Italian American, and his father, Albert Eugene Theroux, was French Canadian. His mother was a grammar school teacher and his father was a salesman for the American Leather Oak company. Theroux graduated from Medford High School; he attended Boys State in Amherst, Massachusetts, was class president in 1956, and was a starting member of the Medford High School basketball team.

He entered the Trappist Monastery at St. Joseph's Abbey in Spencer, Massachusetts in 1958, and then the Franciscan Seminary at Callicoon, New York in 1960. He earned his Bachelor of Arts at St. Francis College in 1964. He earned a masters of arts in English literature in 1965, and his doctorate in English literature, 1968 at the University of Virginia, where he won the Schubert Playwrighting Fellowship in 1967. He belonged to both the Raven Society and the Society of the Purple Shadows.

He spent a year on a Fulbright Grant in London in 1969. He was awarded a Guggenheim Fellowship in 1974.

== Career ==
=== Academic ===
He taught at the University of Virginia in 1968 and at Harvard University as Brigg-Copeland Lecturer from 1973 to 1979. He was writer-in-residence at Phillips Academy in Andover from 1979 to 1982. He taught at the Massachusetts Institute of Technology from 1982 to 1987 and at Yale University from 1987 to 1991. He has also lived in England, Estonia, and France.

=== Literary ===
Three Wogs, his first novel, was written during a stay in London and was briefly considered by the actor Roy Dotrice for performance by BBC television. Darconville’s Cat, his second novel, was nominated for the National Book Award.

He published the fable Master Snickup’s Cloak, which was illustrated by Brian Froud, in 1979. That followed two other fables, The Schinocephalic Waif and The Wragby Cars, with illustrations by Stan Washburn, in 1975.

In 1987, he published An Adultery. Laura Warholic, his longest and most satirical novel, was published in 2007.

His non-fiction books on color, The Primary Colors (1994) and The Secondary Colors (1996), were briefly on the best-seller lists in Los Angeles.

As a writer, he is known for his encyclopedic, highly allusive style and learned wit. Critic Colin Marshall wrote “Defending of his prose, Theroux once likened it to 'a Victorian attic.' He delivers more inner life than outer, more desire for vengeance than for anything else, and more sheer stuff per page—stuff you don't expect—than in any other novels.” Steven Moore called him an "overlooked modern master".

Literary broadcaster Michael Silverblatt once questioned Theroux's "perverse appreciation" at how inaccessible his books are thought to be.

“Perhaps he sees his finely-wrought works of language and their lack of purchase on the culture as an apocalyptic indictment of that culture, of the intellectually (and especially verbally) careless society that could corrupt them. Were I him, I feel as if I’d want revenge: against lazy readers, against unengaged critics, against risk-averse publishers. But maybe, given what they’re all missing out on, he’s already taking it.”

Theroux's work has been published in Esquire, The London Magazine, Antaeus, The New York Times, Harper’s Magazine, The Massachusetts Review, Art & Antiques, Mississippi Review, Review of Contemporary Fiction, Chicago Tribune, and San Diego Reader. His poems have appeared in The Yale Review, The Paris Review, Poetry East, Conjunctions, Graham House Review, The San Diego Reader, Exquisite Corpse, Denver Quarterly, The Literary Quarterly, Urbanus Magazine, Boulevard, The Michigan Quarterly Review, Rain Taxi, Review of Contemporary Fiction, Image, Helicoptero, Seneca Review, The Recorder, The Journal of the American Irish Historical Society, 3rd Bed, Fence, Anomaly, Subdrive, Sahara Sahara, Nantucket Magazine, Gobshite Quarterly, Gargoyle Magazine, Italian-American, Bomb, Provincetown Arts, Green Mountains Review, and The Hopkins Review.

== Plagiarism controversy ==
In 1995, The New York Times reported that one of its readers had noted the similarity of six passages in Theroux's 1994 survey of The Primary Colors with a 1954 book Song of the Sky by Guy Murchie. Theroux attributed the matter to "stupidity and bad note taking," noting that he had read hundreds of books for The Primary Colors. Theroux's editor said that future editions would credit Murchie's work, or remove the passages. A few months later, Theroux published a lengthy defense in the San Diego Reader.

== Selected awards ==
- Schubert Playwrighting Award (1967)
- Fulbright Grant (1969–1970)
- Guggenheim Grant (1974)
- National Book Award nominee (twice)
- Clifton Fadiman Medal from the Mercantile Library (2002)
- Lannan Foundation Grant (1991)

== Selected works ==
=== Novels ===
- Three Wogs (1972)
- Darconville's Cat (1981)
- An Adultery (1987)
- Laura Warholic or, The Sexual Intellectual (2007)
- Cape Cod Tales (2024)

=== Fables ===
- The Schinocephalic Waif (1975)
- The Great Wheadle Tragedy (1975)
- Master Snickup's Cloak (1979)

=== Poetry ===
- The Lollipop Trollops (1992)
- Collected Poems (2015)
- Truisms (2022)
- Godfather Drosselmeier’s Tears & Other Poems (2023)
- Truisms II (2024)
- Maud Blessingbourne’s Temptations and Other Poems (2026)
- Truisms III (2026)

=== Short fiction ===
- Early Stories (2021)
- Fables (2021)
- Later Stories (2022)
- Spite; or, Wounds That Wouldn't Heal (2025)

=== Non-fiction ===
- The Primary Colors (1994)
- The Secondary Colors (1996)
- The Enigma of Al Capp (1999)
- The Strange Case of Edward Gorey (2000) (revised, updated edition 2011) — winner of the 2001 Firecracker Alternative Book Award for Nonfiction
- Estonia: A Ramble Through the Periphery (2011)
- The Grammar of Rock: Art and Artlessness in 20th Century Pop Lyrics (2013)
- Einstein's Beets: An Examination of Food Phobias (2017)
- Artists Who Kill & Other Essays on Art (2023)
- American Candy and Other Essays (2025)

=== Critical studies ===
- Jo Allen Bradham, "The American Scholar: From Emerson to Alexander Theroux's Darconville's Cat. Critique 24.4 (Summer 1983): 215-27.
- Larry McCaffery, "And Still They Smooch: Erotic Visions and Re-visions in Postmodern American Fiction." Revue Française d'Etudes Américaines 9.20 (May 1984): 275–87.
- Steven Moore, "Alexander Theroux's Darconville's Cat and the Tradition of Learned Wit." Contemporary Literature 27.2 (Summer 1986): 233–45.
- Michael Pinker, "Cupid and Vindice: The Novels of Alexander Theroux." Denver Quarterly 24.3 (Winter 1990): 101–24.
- "Alexander Theroux/Paul West Number", The Review of Contemporary Fiction 11.1 (Spring 1991): 7–139.
- Sam Endrigkeit. “‘Do Your Worst’: Maximalism and Intertextuality in Alexander Theroux's Darconville’s Cat." Thesis, Universität Duisburg-Essen, 2015.
- Steven Moore. Alexander Theroux: A Fan's Notes. Los Angeles: Zerogram Press, 2020. ISBN 978-1-55713-446-2
- Greg Gerke, "An Adultery." In his See What I See. Los Angeles: Zerogram Press, 2021, 112–16.
