= Lightning Rods (novel) =

2011 novel by Helen DeWitt

- First edition
- Author: Helen DeWitt
- Language: English
- Publisher: New Directions
- Publication date: October 2011
- Media type: Print (Paperback)
- Pages: 288 pp
- ISBN: 978-0811220347
- OCLC: 828418632

Lightning Rods is a 2011 novel by Helen DeWitt. It was DeWitt's second novel, following The Last Samurai. Though written immediately after The Last Samurai, it remained unpublished for more than a decade before it was published by New Directions.

== Plot summary ==
Joe is a struggling encyclopedia salesman who moved from Eureka, Missouri to Florida in order to sell vacuum cleaners, only to find that another salesman had already saturated the market in the aftermath of a hurricane. One day while driving along the shore he stops and parks his car on a whim, and while looking at the shorebirds, he has a revelation. He realizes that companies could avoid sexual harassment in the workplace and the consequent expensive lawsuits if they provided some kind of outlet for their male employees' sexual urges. Combining this insight with one of his own recurring sexual fantasies, he hits on the idea of hiring women to have sex with selected male employees, with the anonymity of both the men and women protected by a wall that would separate them and only expose the woman's lower half. The women, referred to as "lightning rods", would otherwise work as regular office employees, and no one in the office would know who they were.

In the first phase of Joe's project, he convinces a small office to implement a voluntary "spin the bottle"-like program in which two employees are randomly selected once a day to kiss each other in front of the rest of the office. The program turns out to be popular, and, emboldened by its success, Joe decides to look for a company to pitch his full idea. Most of the executives he talks to reject him out of hand, but he is able to find one who is willing to try it. Joe has an elaborate mechanism installed in the disabled stalls of the men's and women's bathrooms, which share a common wall. It is kept secret to everyone except Joe, the CEO, the group of high-performing male employees selected to participate, and the lightning rods themselves.

The program is immediately successful. Some of his lightning rods use the extra earnings to further their careers; two of them in particular, Lucille and Renée, are able to save up to go to Harvard Law School, and later in life Lucille becomes a wealthy corporate lawyer and Renée becomes a Supreme Court justice. Many of the other lightning rods find the work psychologically difficult, however. As the program becomes well-established, Joe makes refinements and starts expanding to other companies.

At some point, the idea takes off in the wider world. A couple of competitors crop up offering a cheaper version that is closer to outright prostitution. Joe is contacted by the FBI and agrees to an expansion into the public sector on condition that the FBI can access the participants' identities. Joe also branches out into tangentially related products: inspired by seeing a man with dwarfism in Kansas City, he invents a height-adjustable toilet.

At the end of the novel, lightning rods have become a widespread, though still controversial, industry.

== Reception ==
Jennifer Szalai, writing in The New York Times, wrote "DeWitt points to problems that are recognizable and real — how men’s desires can differ from women’s, how harassment can upend a workplace — and offers up a modest proposal using the familiar rhetoric of our time." This article praises DeWitt's blunt but good work, "To find fault in DeWitt’s broad strokes, in the novel’s brusque disregard for any depth of feeling, would be like denouncing Mel Brooks for having made 'The Producers' instead of 'The Pawnbroker.'"

The Guardian described it as a "tightly disciplined and extremely funny satire on office politics, sexual politics, American politics, and the art of positive thinking, culminating with a sad, dry attack on the very basis of constitutional democracy."

Garth Risk Hallberg (author of City on Fire), reviewing the book in The Millions, wrote, "DeWitt’s idiosyncratic intellect has always gravitated toward the gap between messy reality and the logical Ideal, it’s no surprise to find her choosing the narrower path, and succeeding brilliantly."

A review in Slate called it a "demented comic masterpiece."
