= Barbara Celarent =

Barbara Celarent may refer to:

- The traditional names for two of the syllogisms of Aristotelian logic
- A mnemonic poem by William of Sherwood listing the syllogisms
- A pseudonym of Andrew Abbott, American sociologist
- A character from Alexander Theroux' novel "Darconville's Cat"
