= Laura Warholic =

2007 novel by Alexander Theroux

- Cover design
- Author: Alexander Theroux
- Language: English
- Publisher: Fantagraphics Books (first edition)
- Publication date: 2007
- Publication place: United States
- Media type: Print (clothbound hardcover)
- Pages: 878
- ISBN: 1-56097-798-1
- OCLC: 74968283

Laura Warholic; or, The Sexual Intellectual is a 2007 novel by Alexander Theroux. The plot concerns the relationship between Eugene Eyestones, the writer of an advice column called "The Sexual Intellectual", and his editor's ex-wife, Laura Warholic, whom Eyestones pities more than likes. This basic story provides the jumping off point for Theroux's satire of American culture.

== Publication ==
The book was published by Fantagraphics Books, a comics publisher who had published Theroux's monographs on Edward Gorey and Al Capp. Notably, it is the first all-prose novel released by the publisher. Theroux stated they were the only ones "willing to publish the full manuscript without carping or cozy abridgements."

The cover design by the author, features an unreferenced photo of Evelyn Nesbit taken by Rudolf Eickemeyer in 1901. It has been criticized as "misleading at best", as the title character is not a beauty, and the subtitle refers to an advice column in the novel. After the bound galleys of the novel were produced in September 2006, Theroux added this sentence to justify the cover art, describing protagonist Eugene Eyestones's room: "Almost in counterpoint [to an "ikon of the Madonna"] hung a photograph of the transfiguringly lovely Evelyn Nesbit, the 'Girl on the Velvet Swing,' vivid of beauty, long of hair, American ikon of sex and scandal, love and loss" (p. 71).

== Plot summary ==
Eugene Eyestones, an erudite recluse and bespectacled Vietnam veteran, writes The Sexual Intellectual, a column that discusses anything related to sex, as a contributor to Quink, a monthly magazine published in Boston by Minot Warholic. Quink has an eclectic group of coworkers and collaborators, diverse people ready to disagree and display prejudices. They include characters named Discknickers, the “pseudo-fascist” accountant; Ratnaster, the atheist interviewer; Duxbak, Eyestones' only friend; Mutrix, the homophobe lawyer; Chasuble, the homophile movie critic; and lesbians Ann Marie Tubb and The Krauthammer.

Laura Warholic, the estranged former wife of the publisher, had moved from San Francisco to Boston, where she is being befriended by Eyestones. She is younger and described as sexless, lacking charm, interests, drive, and ambition. She is interested only in rock and rock musicians. Pity appears his main attractive force to her, yet he also exploits her for his writings. Eyestones has secret longings for Rapunzel Wisht, a beautiful young woman working at the local bakery.

After writing a misogynistic essay that even Warholic finds it "harsh on the chicks", Eyestones takes a break from writing and invites Laura on a summer vacation drive across the country. During their tour, their incompatibility becomes obvious. Back in Boston, they start to drift apart, and Laura becomes obsessed with the Craven Slucks, a local rock band, throwing herself at its lead singer Jeff. After the office Christmas party, Eyestones joins coworkers for a trip to a strip bar. Crayola de Blu, the main attraction, is none other than his adored Rapunzel; he is angry, feels cheated, lost and deprived. He concludes that all this was his own shortcomings and that he had exploited Laura. Confessing his failures to Duxbak, Eyestones realizes that he has to ask for forgiveness. He tries to see Laura to amend, but due to a misidentification gets shot and killed. Laura, lonely and desolate, hangs herself.

== Reception ==
Carlo Wolff calls the novel "a gallimaufry of minimal action and maximal thought" as well as "a "credible stab at writing the Great American novel." “Unrepentantly erudite and opinionated, Theroux is a prolix polymath with a predilection for employing the proper word (even if you’ve never before seen it) and for chronicling obsessive behavior, usually between men and women,“ writes Anthony Miller. Full of “ten-dollar words and killer factoids” the novel has similarities to his previous work, Darconville's Cat, describing love and hate, loss and longing in the human male-female relationship. The reader has to wonder why is Eyestones so involved with Laura who seems to be kind of a "muse in reverse"? Distinctly politically incorrect and misogynistic the novel presents characters that are cartoonish, according to David Bowman. Scott Bryan Wilson sees the novel as a "compendium of vituperation against contemporary society, jabs at pop culture, exposés of office politics, and exploration of life and love in modern times". He notes that the "semi-plotlessness of the book echoes the aimlessness and desperation of Laura's life, and really, most of the other characters' lives as well." He describes the work as a "funny, sad, and original satire of our funny, sad contemporary culture". Jeff VanderMeer opines that the use of metaphor is daring in its brilliance but criticizes that almost every person is made to look "morally, ethically, and intellectually ugly."

Mark Burstein bemoans the absence of good editorial help in the novel's publishing. In the years leading up to publication, Theroux added a good deal of material to the original manuscript, completed in 2000.
