= Novel Explosives =

2016 experimental novel

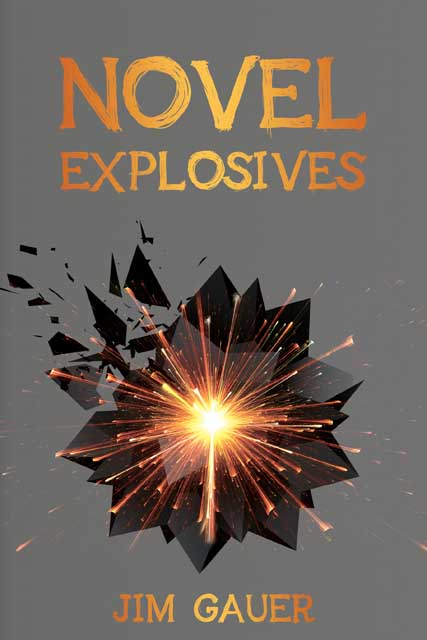
- First edition
- Author: Jim Gauer
- Language: English
- Genre: Philosophical fiction, postmodernism
- Publisher: Zerogram Press
- Publication date: 2016
- Publication place: United States of America
- Media type: Print
- Pages: 720
- ISBN: 978-1-953409-02-7

Novel Explosives by Jim Gauer (Zerogram Press, 2016) is a novel that tells three interrelated stories set in Los Angeles, Ciudad Juárez, and Guanajuato.

The novel is named after a thermobaric weapon introduced by the US Marine Corps during the 2003 Invasion of Iraq called a "Novel Explosive" (SMAW-NE).

There are many references to the poet Fernando Pessoa.

Jeff Bursey writing for Numéro Cinq described the novel as having Quentin Tarantino-like action sequences paired with metafictional flourishes.

Critic Steven Moore listed it as one of the potentially “canonical” novels of the 21st century.

In 2026, Zerogram Press published a "10th Anniversary Edition" with a Foreword by Joy Williams.
