= Felipe Alfau =

American novelist and poet

- Born: 24 August 1902; Barcelona, Catalonia, Spain
- Died: 18 February 1999 (aged 96); New York City, U.S.
- Occupations: Novelist and poet

Felipe Alfau (24 August 1902 – 18 February 1999) was a Spanish-born American novelist and poet. Most of his works were written in English.

== Biography ==
Born in Barcelona, Alfau emigrated to the United States with his family at the age of fourteen. He lived in the United States for the remainder of his life. Alfau earned a living as a translator. His sparse creation of fictional and poetic output remained obscure throughout most of his lifetime.

Alfau wrote two novels in English: Locos: A Comedy of Gestures and Chromos. Locos — a metafictive collection of related short stories set in Toledo and Madrid, involving several characters that defy the wishes of the author, write their own stories, and even assume each other's roles — was published by Farrar & Rinehart in 1936. The novel, for which Alfau was paid $250, received some critical acclaim, but little popular attention. The novel was republished in 1987 after Steven Moore, then an editor for the small publisher Dalkey Archive Press, found the book at a barn sale in Massachusetts, read it, and contacted Alfau after a friend had found his telephone number in the Manhattan phone book. The novel's second edition was modestly successful, but Alfau refused payment, instructing the publisher to use the earnings from Locos to fund some other unpublished work. When Moore asked if he had written any other books, Alfau produced the manuscript for Chromos, which had been resting in a drawer since 1948. A comic story of Spanish immigrants to the United States contending with their two cultures, Chromos went on to be nominated for the National Book Award in 1990.

Alfau also wrote a book of poetry in Spanish, Sentimental Songs (La poesía cursi), written between 1923 and 1987 and published in a bilingual edition in 1992; and a book of children's stories, Old Tales from Spain, published in 1929.

Locos, Chromos and Old Tales from Spain were translated into Spanish and published in Spain during the 1990s.

Alfau's last years were spent in an octogenarian nursing home in New York, thanks to an indigent pension granted by the city council. Felipe Alfau died in New York in 1999.

Dawn Powell knew him in the late 1930s and described him thus in her diaries:

Felipe Alfau, brilliant, dazzling mind, witty, Jesuitical, a mental performance similar only to Cummings, but a scholar—erudite, fascinating, above all a romantic about his Spain, fiercely patriotic, a figure out of a medieval romance, a lover of Toledo, of old Spain, valuable surely to his country—talked so brilliantly of Totalitarianism that is based on human weakness, human error, human conduct, that it almost convinced me.

== Writings ==
- Old Tales from Spain. Illustrated by Rhea Wells. Garden City-New York: Doubleday, Doran & Company, 1929.
- Locos: A Comedy of Gestures. New York: Farrar & Rinehart Inc., 1936.
- Locos: A Comedy of Gestures. Preface by F. A. Afterword by Mary McCarthy. Champaign and London: Dalkey Archive Press, 1988.
- Chromos. Introduction by Joseph Coates. Dalkey Archive Press, 1990.
- Sentimental Songs. La poesía cursi. Bilingual edition. Translated with an introduction by Ilan Stavans. Dalkey Archive Press, 1992.
