= Some Trick =

2018 short story collection by Helen DeWitt

Some Trick: Thirteen Stories
- Author: Helen DeWitt
- Language: English
- Publisher: New Directions Publishing
- Publication date: 29 May 2018
- Publication place: United States
- Pages: 224
- ISBN: 9780811227827

Some Trick: Thirteen Stories, published in 2018, is a short story collection by American writer Helen DeWitt.

== Contents ==
- "Brutto"
- "My Heart Belongs to Bertie"
- "On the Town"
- "Remember Me"
- "Climbers"
- "Improvisation Is the Heart of Music"
- "Famous Last Words"
- "The French Style of Mlle Matsumoto"
- "Stolen Luck"
- "In Which Nick Buys a Harley"
- "Trevor"
- "Plantinga"
- "Entourage"

== Reception ==
Some Trick was well received by critics, including starred reviews from Kirkus Reviews and Publishers Weekly. Kirkus noted that many of the stories illuminate "the backside or underside of creative work" and commended DeWitt's combination of "wide-ranging intellect" with humor and deeply human characters. Publishers Weekly highlighted DeWitt's portrayals of "misunderstood genius" and her "disdain for those who seek to profit off of genius," and praised the collection's "astounding prose" and "thought-provoking stories." The book also received reviews from The Atlantic, Frieze, Harper's Magazine, Los Angeles Review of Books, The Millions, The New York Times, NPR, The Paris Review, and SFGate.
