= Bright star, would I were stedfast as thou art =

Love sonnet by John Keats

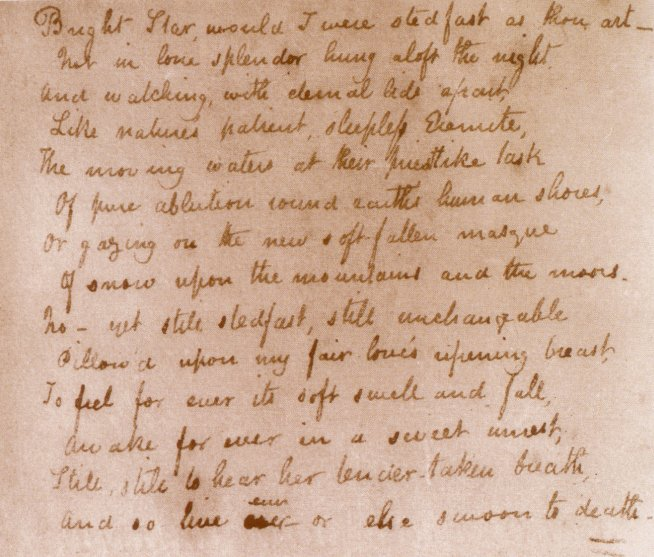
Text transcribed by Keats into a volume of Shakespeare in late September 1820.

"Bright star, would I were stedfast as thou art" is a love sonnet by John Keats.

== Background ==
It is unclear when Keats first drafted "Bright Star"; his biographers suggest different dates. Andrew Motion suggests it was begun in October 1819. Robert Gittings states that Keats began the poem in April 1818 – before he met his beloved Fanny Brawne – and he later revised it for her. Colvin believed it to have been in the last week of February 1819, immediately after their informal engagement.

The final version of the sonnet was copied into a volume of The Poetical Works of William Shakespeare, opposite Shakespeare's poem, A Lover's Complaint. The book had been given to Keats in 1819 by John Hamilton Reynolds. Joseph Severn maintained that the last draft was transcribed into the book in late September 1820 while they were aboard the ship Maria Crowther, travelling to Rome, from where the very sick Keats would never return. The book also contains one sonnet by his friend Reynolds and one by Severn. Keats probably gave the book to Joseph Severn in January 1821 before his death in February, aged 25. Severn believed that it was Keats's last poem and that it had been composed especially for him.

The poem came to be associated with the "Bright Star" Fanny Brawne – with whom Keats became infatuated. Gittings says it was given as "a declaration of his love."

It was officially published in 1838 in The Plymouth and Devonport Weekly Journal, 17 years after Keats's death.

== The text ==
Bright Star! would I were stedfast as thou art--
Not in lone splendour hung aloft the night,
And watching, with eternal lids apart,
Like nature's patient, sleepless Eremite,
The moving waters at their priestlike task
Of pure ablution round earth's human shores,
Or gazing on the new soft-fallen masque
Of snow upon the mountains and the moors--
No--yet still stedfast, still unchangeable,
Pillow'd upon my fair love's ripening breast,
To feel for ever its soft swell and fall,
Awake for ever in a sweet unrest,
Still, still to hear her tender-taken breath,
And so live ever--or else swoon to death.

Addressed to a star (perhaps Polaris, around which the heavens appear to wheel), the sonnet expresses the poet's wish to be as constant as the star while he presses against his sleeping love. The use of the star imagery is unusual in that Keats dismisses many of its more apparent qualities, focusing on the star's steadfast and passively watchful nature. In the first recorded draft (copied by Charles Brown and dated to early 1819), the poet loves unto death; by the final version, death is an alternative to (ephemeral) love.

The poem uses the rhyme form of the Shakespearean sonnet (ABABCDCDEFEFGG) with the customary volta, or turn in the train of thought, occurring after the octave (the first eight lines). It is punctuated as a single sentence, though it uses an em dash at the end of the octave, effectively to start a new sentence with the sestet (concluding six lines).

== In popular culture ==
In Alexander Theroux's 1981 novel Darconville's Cat the poem is discussed by the protagonist when teaching his English class.

Bright Star, a 2009 biopic on Keats's life starring Ben Whishaw and Abbie Cornish, focused on the final three years of his life and his relationship with Fanny Brawne. It was named Bright Star after this poem, which is recited multiple times in the film.

In the Covert Affairs episode "Speed of Life" (Season 3, Episode 4) the character Simon Fischer admits to Annie Walker that the tattoo on his upper left shoulder blade of Ursa Minor was inspired by John Keats's poem. Although she asks him, Simon doesn't tell her who in his life was his bright star or the reason behind getting the tattoo. This tattoo is the symbol used by Jai Wilcox to mark Simon's dossier within the CIA.

In the DC Comics event series Heroes in Crisis issue #6 by writer Tom King and artist Clay Mann, Gnarrk recites the poem on a full page showing him lying over his mammoth under a clear beautiful sky.

== Bibliography ==
- Colvin, Sidney. John Keats: His Life and Poetry, His Friends, Critics and After-Fame (London: Macmillan, 1917)
- Lancashire, Ian. 'John Keats: Bright Star', Representative Poetry Online (Toronto: University, 2003). Retrieved July 27, 2005.
