= Lightning rod (disambiguation) =

A lightning rod is a metal rod mounted on a structure and intended to protect the structure from a lightning strike.

== Other uses ==
- Lightning Rod (roller coaster), a roller coaster located at Dollywood theme park in Pigeon Forge, Tennessee
- Lightning Rods (novel), a novel by Helen DeWitt
- Lightning Conductor (film), a 1938 British comedy thriller film
- The Lightning Rods, another name for the Great Lakes Avengers
- Jalal Mansur Nuriddin, an American poet and musician who used the name Lightnin' Rod.
- A playable character in the Skylanders video game series.
