= Facial Justice =

1960 book by L. P. Hartley

First edition (published by Hamish Hamilton).

Facial Justice is a dystopian novel by L. P. Hartley, published in 1960. The novel depicts a post-apocalyptic society that has sought to banish privilege and envy, to the extent that people will even have their faces surgically altered in order to appear neither too beautiful nor too ugly. The novel was included in Anthony Burgess' essay Ninety-nine Novels.

== Plot summary ==
After a devastating nuclear war, the surviving people of Earth have been forced to live in caverns, ruled by harsh dictatorships. In Britain, an unseen leader inspires a large section of the populace to escape the caverns and forms a new dictatorship above ground. This new society is based on a collective sense of guilt at the events of the nuclear war. All subjects are named after famous murderers from history, and are obliged to wear sackcloth so as not to provoke envy with their appearance. The Dictator is never seen, but his voice is broadcast to his subjects regularly, instructing them on the laws and morals of his society. His rule is enforced by Inspectors, who have the power to fine people for minor infringements or report them to the higher ministries for further punishment.

A young woman named Jael 97, who has been reported to the Ministry of Facial Justice for being "facially over privileged" and causing discontent among other women, approaches the Equalisation (Faces) Centre to have a synthetic "Beta" face fitted so that she will blend in with the community. At the urging of a friend, however, she decides to put this off. Her resultant guilt, along with subsequent events—her forbidden delight at the idea of "height" during an excursion to the ruined tower of Ely Cathedral; her injury in a planned motor-coach accident during her return from the excursion; her rescue by the Inspector Michael, with whom she falls in love; and her involuntary "Betafication" at the hospital to which she is taken—provokes her rebellious spirit, and she forms a resistance group whose aim is to undermine the regime and show it up as ridiculous. She also writes articles in magazines and papers, in which she deliberately stretches the rules of society to ridiculous proportions—suggesting, for instance, that spelling and grammatical errors in writing should not be criticised, as this can lead to envy and bitterness between people.

From the doctor who Betafied her (and who desires her), Jael manages to find out that he has also treated the Dictator and that the Dictator's chest bears a heart-shaped birthmark. In her desire to find and kill the Dictator, she writes an article urging that anyone should be able to challenge another person on the street to bare their chest and prove they have no birthmarks. This is, she claims, to ensure that everyone is as alike as possible. The idea proves divisive amongst the public and begins to cause a great deal of public disorder. Rioting breaks out on the streets, and in the absence of any advice from the Dictator, the public turn on him and denounce him. The Dictator finally responds by announcing that he can see that the public no longer appreciate his leadership and protection and, therefore, he will be leaving.

The country descends into chaos after the Dictator's departure. Further rioting ensues, and food supplies are exhausted as the means of production are abandoned or destroyed. The remaining government officials realise they will have to ask the underground dictatorships for food supplies. The leaders of the underground society agree to help, but demand that in return six people be sent to them, presumably to be executed.

Jael, out of a sense of guilt at her role in the collapse of society, decides to volunteer to be one of the people sent underground. On the night before she intends to so offer herself, she remains awake to savour her last few hours above ground. Then, amidst sounds of a rainstorm outside, there is a knock at her door, which she opens to reveal an old lady who had been kind to her when she was hospitalised, clearly weak with hunger and soaked from heavy rain. Jael lets her into her home and offers her some clothes to change into. To Jael's astonishment, she finds that the lady bears the Dictator's birthmark and is, in fact, the Dictator. Clearly on the verge of death, the lady reveals that Michael (who has also arrived on the scene) has acted as her "voice" in the Dictator's announcements. She also begs Jael to take on the role of Dictator and restore order and hope to the people. The novel ends with Jael, seemingly having accepted the offer from the Dictator, starting to address the public, through Michael's voice, for the first time.

== Reception ==
Anthony Burgess included Facial Justice in Ninety-nine Novels, his selection of best novels in the English language since 1939. Burgess described the novel as "A brilliant projection of tendencies apparent in the post-war British welfare state ... Hartley was a fine writer with a strong moral sense". The Times was equally lavish in its praise, describing Hartley's vision in the novel as "a brilliantly witty survey of certain contemporary trends and weaknesses". Galaxy's Floyd C. Gale rated Facial Justice 3.5 stars. He described the novel as "learned, thoughtful and provocative" despite being "short on drama and long on talk."

== See also ==
- "Harrison Bergeron", a short story with a similar theme by Kurt Vonnegut
- The Sirens of Titan, a novel with a similar theme by Kurt Vonnegut
