= John O'Brien (publisher) =

Irish American publisher and academic (1945–2020)

- Born: November 10, 1945; Chicago, Illinois
- Died: November 21, 2020 (aged 75); McLean, Illinois
- Occupations: Publisher, editor, author, and academic

John O'Brien (November 10, 1945 – November 21, 2020) was an Irish American publisher, editor, author, and academic. He founded the journal Review of Contemporary Fiction in 1980, and the independent press Dalkey Archive Press in 1984. In the course of his career, O’Brien published almost 1,000 books from 50 countries.

== Life ==
O'Brien taught at Illinois Benedictine College, DePaul University, Illinois State University, University of Illinois Urbana-Champaign, and then University of Houston-Victoria.

O’Brien was awarded the Sandrof Lifetime Achievement Award from the National Book Critics Circle in 2011, and in 2015 O'Brien was made Chevalier of the Ordre des Arts et des Lettres. He was the father of Kathleen O’Brien, Emmett O’Brien, William O’Brien, and Kevin O’Brien. He died on November 21, 2020, in Illinois.
