= Dalkey Archive Press =

American publisher

- Parent company: Deep Vellum
- Founded: 1984
- Country of origin: United States
- Headquarters location: Funks Grove, Illinois
- Distribution: Ingram Publisher Services (US); Central Books (UK)
- Publication types: Books
- Official website: www.dalkeyarchive.com

Dalkey Archive Press is an American publisher of fiction, poetry, foreign translations and literary criticism specializing in the publication or republication of lesser-known, often avant-garde works. The company has offices in Funks Grove, Illinois, in Dublin, and in London. The publisher is named for the novel The Dalkey Archive, by the Irish author Flann O'Brien. It is owned by nonprofit publisher Deep Vellum.

Founded in Elmwood Park, Illinois in 1984 by John O'Brien, Dalkey Archive Press began as an adjunct press to the literary magazine Review of Contemporary Fiction, itself founded by John O'Brien, John Byrne, and Lowell Dunlap and dedicated to highlighting writers who were overlooked by the mainstream critical establishment. Initially, the press reprinted works by authors featured in the Review but eventually branched out to other works, including original works that had not been published. Until 1988, Dalkey Archive was a two-person operation: O'Brien and office manager/typesetter Shirley Geever. That year O'Brien hired Steven Moore as managing editor. Later editors include Chad Post (who went on to found Open Letter Books), and authors Martin Riker, Danielle Dutton, and Jeremy Davies.

In 1992, the press accepted an invitation to move from suburban Chicago to Illinois State University in Normal, Illinois. In December 2006, Dalkey Archive relocated to University of Illinois Urbana-Champaign to be part of the university's commitment to global projects that complement the press's commitment to translations.

Modeled on such publishers as Grove Press and New Directions, Dalkey Archive's emphasis is decidedly upon literary fiction, usually of a modernist or postmodernist bent. In the publisher's own words, Dalkey Archive "place[s] a heavy emphasis upon fiction that belongs to the experimental tradition of Sterne, Joyce, Rabelais, Flann O'Brien, Beckett, Gertrude Stein and Djuna Barnes." One of the publisher's primary goals is to keep all of its books in print, regardless of their commercial success, in the interest of maintaining the availability of works that it deems culturally and educationally valuable.

In 2011, Dalkey founder John O'Brien was awarded the Ivan Sandrof Lifetime Achievement Award by the National Book Critics Circle. In 2015, O'Brien was appointed Chevalier in the Ordre des Arts & des Lettres in recognition of his significant contribution to French arts and literature by the Minister of Culture and Communication of France; its authors and translators have been recipients of many major awards, including the Nobel Prize, the Independent Foreign Fiction Prize, the Helen and Kurt Wolff Translator's Prize, the Vondel Prize, and the Premio Valle-Inclán award.

Founder and publisher John O'Brien died on November 21, 2020. He left behind 7 dogs, daughter Kathleen O'Brien, sons Emmett, William, and Kevin, brothers Chip and Eddie, and many other family and friends. Shortly afterward, Dalkey Archive Press was acquired by Deep Vellum.

== Offices ==
Dalkey Archive Press has multiple offices, which are located in McLean, Illinois; Dutch House in London; and the Trinity College Centre for Literary Translation in Dublin.

== Selected publications ==
Dalkey Archive has published a variety of books and authors from many countries. In some cases, the publication of certain books by Dalkey Archive has led to a resurgence in their author's popularity, particularly in the United States, as happened with Felipe Alfau and Flann O'Brien. Some notable books and authors published by Dalkey Archive are listed below.

- Felipe Alfau, Chromos and Locos: A Comedy of Gestures
- Djuna Barnes, Ryder, Nightwood: The Original Version and Related Drafts
- Roger Boylan, Killoyle, An Irish Farce
- Anne Carson, Eros the Bittersweet
- Joshua Cohen, Witz
- Robert Coover, A Night at the Movies
- Helen DeWitt and Ilya Gridneff, Your Name Here
- Jean Echenoz, Chopin's Move
- Jon Fosse, Melancholy, Melancholy II
- Kass Fleisher, Talking out of School: Memoir of an Educated Woman
- Carlos Fuentes, Terra Nostra
- William Gaddis, J R and The Recognitions
- William Gass, The Tunnel
- Henry Green, Concluding
- Aidan Higgins, Flotsam and Jetsam and Bornholme Night Ferry
- G. Cabrera Infante, Three Trapped Tigers
- Hugh Kenner, Flaubert, Joyce, and Beckett: The Stoic Comedians
- Danilo Kis, A Tomb for Boris Davidovich
- António Lobo Antunes, Knowledge of Hell
- Yuri Lotman, Non-Memoirs
- Ben Marcus, The Age of Wire and String
- David Markson, Wittgenstein's Mistress
- Harry Mathews, My Life in CIA
- Nicholas Mosley, Natalie Natalia
- Dan O'Brien, A Story That Happens
- Flann O'Brien, At Swim-Two-Birds and The Third Policeman
- Patrik Ouředník, Europeana: A Brief History of the Twentieth Century
- Raymond Queneau, Pierrot Mon Ami
- Ann Quin, Berg and Passages
- Ishmael Reed, Yellow Back Radio Broke-Down
- Arno Schmidt, Bottom's Dream
- Viktor Shklovsky, Theory of Prose and Energy of Delusion
- Gilbert Sorrentino, Blue Pastoral and Mulligan Stew
- Boris Vian, Heartsnatcher
- Douglas Woolf, Wall to Wall
- Philip Wylie, Generation of Vipers
