= Ninety-nine Novels =

1984 book by Anthony Burgess

First edition (publ. Allison & Busby) Cover art Richard Willson

Ninety-Nine Novels: The Best in English since 1939 – A Personal Choice is an essay by British writer Anthony Burgess, published by Allison & Busby in 1984. It covers a 44-year span between 1939 and 1983. Burgess was a prolific reader, in his early career reviewing more than 350 novels in just over two years for The Yorkshire Post. In the course of his career he wrote more than 30 novels. The list represents his choices; in an interview with Don Swaim, Burgess revealed that the book was originally commissioned by a Nigerian publishing company and written in two weeks.

== The List ==
Author	Title	Year
Chinua Achebe	A Man of the People	1966
Brian Aldiss	Life in the West	1980
Kingsley Amis	Lucky Jim	1954
Kingsley Amis	The Anti-Death League	1966
James Baldwin	Another Country	1962
J. G. Ballard	The Unlimited Dream Company	1979
John Barth	Giles Goat-Boy	1966
Saul Bellow	The Victim	1947
Saul Bellow	Humboldt's Gift	1975
Elizabeth Bowen	The Heat of the Day	1949
Malcolm Bradbury	The History Man	1975
John Braine	Room at the Top	1957
Joyce Cary	The Horse's Mouth	1944
Raymond Chandler	The Long Goodbye	1953
Ivy Compton-Burnett	The Mighty and Their Fall	1961
William Cooper	Scenes from Provincial Life	1950
Robertson Davies	The Rebel Angels	1982
Len Deighton	Bomber	1970
Lawrence Durrell	The Alexandria Quartet	1957
Ralph Ellison	Invisible Man	1952
William Faulkner	The Mansion	1959
Ian Fleming	Goldfinger	1959
John Fowles	The French Lieutenant's Woman	1969
Michael Frayn	Sweet Dreams	1973
William Golding	The Spire	1964
Nadine Gordimer	The Late Bourgeois World	1966
Alasdair Gray	Lanark	1981
Henry Green	Party Going	1939
Graham Greene	The Power and the Glory	1940
Graham Greene	The Heart of the Matter	1948
Wilson Harris	Heartland	1964
L. P. Hartley	Facial Justice	1960
Joseph Heller	Catch-22	1961
Ernest Hemingway	For Whom the Bell Tolls	1940
Ernest Hemingway	The Old Man and the Sea	1952
Russell Hoban	Riddley Walker	1980
Richard Hughes	The Fox in the Attic	1961
Aldous Huxley	After Many a Summer	1939
Aldous Huxley	Ape and Essence	1948
Aldous Huxley	Island	1962
Christopher Isherwood	A Single Man	1964
Pamela Hansford Johnson	An Error of Judgement	1962
Erica Jong	How to Save Your Own Life	1977
James Joyce	Finnegans Wake	1939
Doris Lessing	The Golden Notebook	1962
David Lodge	How Far Can You Go?	1980
Malcolm Lowry	Under the Volcano	1947
Colin MacInnes	The London Novels	1957
Norman Mailer	The Naked and the Dead	1948
Norman Mailer	Ancient Evenings	1983
Bernard Malamud	The Assistant	1957
Bernard Malamud	Dubin's Lives	1979
Olivia Manning	The Balkan Trilogy	1960
W. Somerset Maugham	The Razor's Edge	1944
Mary McCarthy	The Groves of Academe	1952
Brian Moore	The Doctor's Wife	1976
Iris Murdoch	The Bell	1958
Vladimir Nabokov	Pale Fire	1962
Vladimir Nabokov	The Defense	1964
V. S. Naipaul	A Bend in the River	1979
R. K. Narayan	The Vendor of Sweets	1967
Robert Nye	Falstaff	1976
Flann O'Brien	At Swim-Two-Birds	1939
Flannery O'Connor	Wise Blood	1952
John O'Hara	The Lockwood Concern	1965
George Orwell	Nineteen Eighty-Four	1949
Mervyn Peake	Titus Groan	1946
Walker Percy	The Last Gentleman	1966
James Plunkett	Farewell Companions	1977
Anthony Powell	A Dance to the Music of Time	1951
J. B. Priestley	The Image Men	1968
Thomas Pynchon	Gravity's Rainbow	1973
Mordecai Richler	Cocksure	1968
Keith Roberts	Pavane	1968
Philip Roth	Portnoy's Complaint	1969
J. D. Salinger	The Catcher in the Rye	1951
William Sansom	The Body	1949
Budd Schulberg	The Disenchanted	1950
Paul Mark Scott	Staying On	1977
Nevil Shute	No Highway	1948
Alan Sillitoe	Saturday Night and Sunday Morning	1958
C. P. Snow	Strangers and Brothers	1940
Muriel Spark	The Girls of Slender Means	1963
Muriel Spark	The Mandelbaum Gate	1965
William Styron	Sophie's Choice	1979
Alexander Theroux	Darconville's Cat	1981
Paul Theroux	The Mosquito Coast	1981
John Kennedy Toole	A Confederacy of Dunces	1980
John Updike	The Coup	1978
Gore Vidal	Creation	1981
Rex Warner	The Aerodrome	1941
Evelyn Waugh	Brideshead Revisited	1945
Evelyn Waugh	Sword of Honour	1952
T. H. White	The Once and Future King	1958
Patrick White	Riders in the Chariot	1961
Henry Williamson	A Chronicle of Ancient Sunlight	1951
Angus Wilson	The Old Men at the Zoo	1961
Angus Wilson	Late Call	1964
Herman Wouk	The Caine Mutiny	1951
