= Helen DeWitt =

American writer (born 1957)

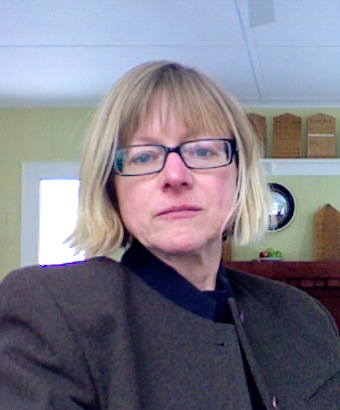
- DeWitt in 2013
- Born: 1957 (age 68–69); Takoma Park, Maryland, U.S.
- Occupation: Writer
- Writing career
- Period: 2000–present
- Genre: Novel
- Website: helendewitt.com

Voice of Helen DeWitt, 2015

Helen DeWitt (born 1957) is an American novelist. She is the author of the novels The Last Samurai (2000) and Lightning Rods (2011) and the short story collection Some Trick (2018). In 2025, a novel which she co-wrote with Ilya Gridneff and published on her website in 2008, Your Name Here, was republished as a commercial book.

== Early life and education ==
Helen DeWitt was born in Takoma Park, Maryland, in 1957. She is a granddaughter of Marine Corps general Ralph B. DeWitt. She grew up primarily in Mexico, Brazil, Colombia, and Ecuador in Latin America, as her father worked in the United States Foreign Service.

After two short periods at Smith College, DeWitt studied classics at Brasenose College, University of Oxford, where she completed a D.Phil. Her thesis examined the concept of propriety in ancient literary criticism. She subsequently became a junior research fellow at Somerville College, Oxford. She spent nine years at Oxford before deciding to leave academia and focus on a career in writing.

== Career ==
=== Novels ===
DeWitt's first novel, The Last Samurai, was published in 2000 by Talk Miramax Books. She had held a variety of jobs while struggling to finish several books, including dictionary text tagger, copytaker, Dunkin' Donuts employee, legal secretary, and working at a laundry service. She completed The Last Samurai, said to be her 50th manuscript, in 1998.

The novel became a cult classic; it sold over 100,000 copies following its original publication and was translated into ten languages. DeWitt found the publishing process challenging, facing difficulties securing copyright permissions for quotations in the book and accounting errors that left her indebted to the publisher. After falling out of print for over a decade due to the publisher's collapse, it was eventually re-issued by New Directions in 2016.

DeWitt completed the novel Lightning Rods in 1999, but it remained unpublished and in limbo for many years (again due to the collapse of her publisher). After Miramax Books was folded into Hyperion Books in late 2007, she asked for the rights to be returned. It was eventually published in 2011 by New Directions, over a decade after her first novel.

Lightning Rods is a satire about a struggling salesman who turns his sexual fantasy of women being stuck in walls into a successful business, in which women are hired as "lightning rods" to provide sex in the workplace and reduce sexual harassment. DeWitt has said her deadpan approach to the subject was inspired by The Producers and Aristophanes. Jennifer Szalai in a review for The New York Times notes that, in contrast to The Last Samurai (a "big novel of both feeling and ideas"), Lightning Rods demonstrates DeWitt's ability to take on "an entirely new set of concerns and constraints".

In 2012 an excerpt from an in-progress novel set in Flin Flon, Manitoba, was published online by Open Book: Ontario at the end of an article about the novel and DeWitt's difficulties in finding a publisher.

=== Your Name Here and other experimental and collaborative work ===
In 2003, DeWitt met Australian journalist Ilya Gridneff in a London bar; their email correspondence would eventually lead to their collaboration on the novel Your Name Here, published first as a PDF on DeWitt's website in 2008 and subsequently published in a print edition by Dalkey Archive Press in 2025. It has been described by Jess Bergman in a review for The Nation as a "sweeping and experimental anti-war novel".

In 2005 DeWitt collaborated with Ingrid Kerma, the London-based painter, writing "limit5" for the exhibition "Blushing Brides". In 2006 DeWitt received a Guggenheim Fellowship to work on an experimental project titled Invisibilities that would have incorporated a website with Arabic and Hebrew texts. In 2008, early resources from the project were available on her website.

=== Short fiction ===
In 2018, a collection of 13 of DeWitt's short stories, Some Trick, was published by New Directions. It was shortlisted for the 2019 PEN/Robert W. Bingham Prize. It included the short story "Climbers", which explores artistic ideals and commercial realities of the writing life, and which had previously been published in Harper's Magazine in November 2014. Andrew Martin, writing in The Paris Review, describes this story as "surely the best piece of fiction about literary publishing in the twenty-first century".

DeWitt published a novella, The English Understand Wool, in 2022. The novella was published as part of a new series from New Directions Publishing, "Storybook ND", which aims to deliver "the pleasure one felt as a child reading a marvelous book from cover to cover in an afternoon".

== Personal life ==
As reported in 2016, "DeWitt knows, in descending order of proficiency, Latin, ancient Greek, French, German, Spanish, Italian, Portuguese, Dutch, Danish, Norwegian, Swedish, Arabic, Hebrew, and Japanese".

While in Oxford, DeWitt married classicist David Levene; they divorced after seven years. DeWitt has said that "Meeting David is what made me a writer", and that he "introduced me to bridge, to poker, to statistics, things that to other people might seem completely unrelated".

DeWitt has said she has considered suicide on multiple occasions, including an attempt while at Smith College. In 2004, DeWitt disappeared after contacting her lawyer with a suicide note; the disappearance was reported by Reuters. She changed her mind and decided not to go through with the plan.

In 2026, DeWitt declined the Windham–Campbell Literature Prize as she felt unable to honour the associated "extensive promotion" commitments. After her decline of the prize, the economist Tyler Cowen gave her a grant of the same sum. Cowen described the newly established grant as being an "ad hoc" award or prize that does not require applications, and aimed at creatives or intellectuals who "are not supported ... or who have been failed" by existing awards and grants.

== Works ==
=== Novels and novellas ===
- DeWitt, Helen (2000). The Last Samurai. New York, London: Talk Miramax Books/Chatto & Windus. ISBN 9780786866687.
- DeWitt, Helen (2011). Lightning Rods. New York: New Directions. ISBN 9781908276117.
- DeWitt, Helen (2022). The English Understand Wool. New York: New Directions. ISBN 9780811230070.
- DeWitt, Helen; Gridneff, Ilya (2025). Your Name Here. Champaign, Illinois: Dalkey Archive Press. (Previously published as a PDF on DeWitt's website in 2008).

=== Short story collection ===
- DeWitt, Helen (2018). Some Trick: Thirteen Stories. New York: New Directions. ISBN 9780811227827.
