= A World with No Shore =

2019 historical fiction

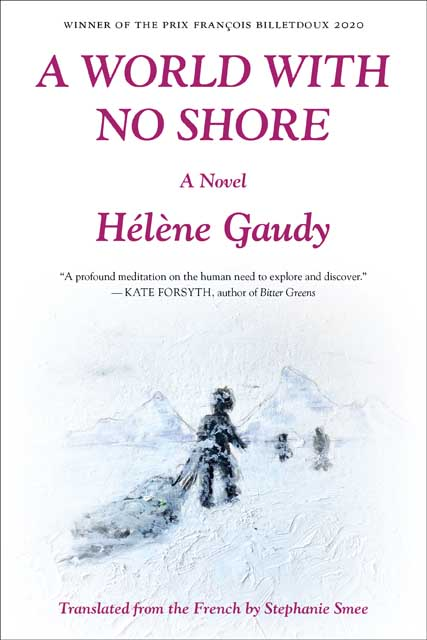
- Zerogram Press edition
- Author: Hélène Gaudy
- Translator: Stephanie Smee
- Cover artist: Mark Cappellano
- Language: French
- Genre: Historical fiction, Philosophical fiction, Postmodernism
- Publisher: Actes Sud
- Publication date: 2019
- English publication date: 2022
- Media type: Print
- Pages: 320
- ISBN: 9782330124946

A World with No Shore (French: Un monde sans rivage) in a 2019 novel by French writer Hélène Gaudy which imagines the doomed 1897 Swedish expedition to the North Pole, known as Andrée's Arctic balloon expedition, from photographs found with the bodies of the explorers—Salomon August Andrée, Knut Frænkel, and Nils Strindberg—over 30 years after their deaths, in 1930.

Originally published by Actes Sud in 2019, this postmodern, historical fiction won the François Billetdoux Prize in 2020. It was translated into English by Stephanie Smee and published by Zerogram Press in 2022.
