= Your Name Here (novel) =

2025 novel by Helen DeWitt and Ilya Gridneff

- Cover of 2025 print edition
- Authors: Helen DeWitt and Ilya Gridneff
- Genre: Experimental fiction
- Publisher: Helen DeWitt (2008 online edition), Dalkey Archive Press (2025 print edition)
- Pages: 606 (2025 print edition)
- ISBN: 9781628976267 (2025 print edition)
- LC Class: PS3554.E92945 Y68 2025

Your Name Here is an experimental novel written by American author Helen DeWitt and Australian journalist Ilya Gridneff. DeWitt made the novel available as a downloadable PDF on her personal website in 2008. Its first print edition was published by Dalkey Archive Press, a division of Deep Vellum, in 2025.

The novel's metafictional and multi-layered narrative follows fictional counterparts of DeWitt and Gridneff, including through their email correspondence and other novels within the novel, and explores the difficulties of writing and publishing a novel. It also features use of the Arabic language, references to the early 2000s war on terror, images and unusual typography. Reviewers praised the novel's artistic ambition, and largely found it rewarding despite its demanding structure. Publishers Weekly and The Telegraph included it in lists of the best books of 2025.

== Overview of the novel ==
The novel combines numerous different narrative strands. One follows a novelist (who shares DeWitt's name and is based on her) as she attempts to write her second book; another incorporates emails exchanged between the novelist and a tabloid journalist (based on Gridneff's own emails to DeWitt). Other strands include a reclusive fictional version of DeWitt called Rachel Zozanian undergoing a mental health crisis, Zozanian's emails with fictional versions of Gridneff under various aliases, chapters of Zozanian's own novel Lotteryland, essays and emails about publishing, and second person sections presenting the perspectives of fictional readers of Your Name Here.

Much of the novel is metafictional and about the difficulties involved in writing and publishing a novel. DeWitt's fictional alter ego considers that Gridneff is an undiscovered genius, comparing him to Hunter S. Thompson, and seeks to find a publishing outlet for his writing. The novel includes a number of references to the 1979 post-modern novel If on a winter's night a traveler by Italo Calvino, an influence for the book's novels-within-a-novel approach, and to the 1963 Italian experimental film 8½, which is also about the challenge of making great art.

The novel also contains Arabic words and phrases, with the intention of encouraging readers to learn Arabic (inspired by readers of J. R. R. Tolkien's novels learning the Elvish languages of Middle-earth), references to the war on terror, images of Marcello Mastroianni, Tom Cruise, Jessica Rabbit and others, and what The Rumpus describes as "artifacts of the early digital age" such as IP addresses and adverts for MSN Messenger.

== Publication history ==
DeWitt's first novel The Last Samurai, published in 2000, received critical praise and became a cult classic, but afterwards DeWitt experienced personal difficulties including a suicide attempt and admission to a psychiatric hospital. She met Gridneff in an East London pub around 2003; he was then in his early 20s and working as a reporter covering coroners' courts. He sent her an email about a month after their meeting, to which DeWitt did not reply. She nevertheless appreciated its literary merit and frequently reread it over the next two years. In 2005, after moving to Berlin, DeWitt replied to Gridneff (by that stage, working as a freelance paparazzo) and they began an email correspondence. DeWitt eventually suggested that they collaborate on a novel.

According to the New York Times, their collaboration "morphed into a 600-page work that resists categorization and almost defies description". DeWitt said that after literary agents told her the book was difficult to follow, she added more material to the book, including the chapters narrated in the second person. She has said that she is not sure whether the book "works or doesn't work". Noemi Press decided not to proceed with publication after deciding it would be too expensive to print, and DeWitt's usual publisher was not interested in a collaborative work. Robert Rubsam for The Atlantic has described the book as being "in the book version of development hell".

In 2008, DeWitt made the novel available for download in PDF form on her website, on a pay-what-you-want pricing basis and with a suggested price of US$8. This version did not include the novel's planned images. The first chapter of the novel was also published in the literary magazine n+1. DeWitt felt that the magazine's description of the novel as "an important and complicated work of art which unjustly has not yet been able to find a publisher" further contributed to difficulties finding a publisher.

The novel's publication rights were sold in 2022 and a print edition published by Dalkey Archive Press in 2025. The print edition is 606 pages, printed on recycled paper and includes images and unconventional typography. The Rumpus suggests it is "stretching the bounds of truth to say that this mystical electronic document is a novel, exactly".

== Reception ==
=== Early reception (2008 online edition) ===
In 2008, Jenny Turner reviewed the novel as published on DeWitt's website for the London Review of Books; she noted that she had double-checked with DeWitt that the novel was available for review. Turner said that in a sense the novel "is simply a scrapbook, attesting to an odd, tense friendship, told through emails, avatars, fictional fragments, with the lack of conventional coherence compensated for by beautiful images". She concluded that while some aspects of the novel (including, in her view, Gridneff's emails to DeWitt) "don't work" and it takes effort to read and understand, "with art as in life, it seems, the relationships that are the most rewarding turn out to be the ones into which you’ve sunk most work".

Ned Beauman for Frieze suggested that for the novel to find a traditional publisher "would undermine its whole reason for being". His verdict was that the novel was "arduous, irritating and muddled, and yet, somehow, it does have a kind of brilliance".

=== Later reception (2025 print edition) ===
Following its print publication in 2025, Your Name Here was selected by Publishers Weekly as one of its top ten books for 2025, and received a starred review from the magazine. The Telegraph also named the novel as being one of the best books of 2025.

Many critics commented on the book's demanding structure. Robert Rubsam, reviewing it for The Atlantic, praised the way the novel "demands work from [its readers], and brazenly risks being misunderstood". He argued that great literature requires readers to be challenged in this way. Chris Power, writing in The Observer, described the novel as being a "time capsule" for the early internet age; "surrender to the manic energies of this 'book-within-a-book-within-a-book-within-a...', and you can glimpse what used to be the future of the novel". Both Kirkus Reviews and Jess Bergman in The Nation described the book as an ouroboros, with Kirkus Reviews adding that the book is "bewildering and beguiling".

Celia Bell in The Rumpus found the different threads of the novel to be "strangely propulsive", despite the book's apparent resistance to being read as a conventional narrative. Norma Clarke in The Times Literary Supplement enjoyed the book's use of the acronym "2FC2E" ("too fucking complicated to explain"), and said, "I did enjoy this book, and it is 2FC2E". Vanessa Francesca in the Sydney Morning Herald called the novel a "matryoshka doll": "a valiant attempt to engage with and explain the challenges of our age in a sprawling, complex set of novels-within-novels that question the place of the novel in a culture defined by asymmetries of information, warfare and power".

Several reviewers praised the novel while acknowledging its imperfections. Gabrielle Schwarz, reviewing the novel for The Daily Telegraph, found the novel "oddly gripping" and "thrillingly strange", but considered that it did not achieve "the same intellectual or emotional expansiveness as DeWitt's earlier work". In a second-person review for the Los Angeles Review of Books, Josh Billings praised the novel's "refreshing boldness", but concluded that it is "a quirky but ultimately untransfigured story", with its experimentation ultimately producing more conventional results than expected. Bergman identified that the novel had some "missteps and excesses", but ultimately concluded:

I thought about the reader in DeWitt and Gridneff's book with whom I had most identified: "You're a romantic at heart. You want writers to be rebels, revolutionaries, you want them to break the machine or be broken." It's hard not to conclude that, right now, the machine is winning. But Your Name Here's brokenness is a testament to the virtues of putting our bodies upon the gears.

The passage of time between the writing of the book and its print publication also received critical attention. Clarke observed that the book's focus on the 2006 Lebanon War and other conflicts forming part of the war on terror felt odd "when even worse has been happening since". By contrast, Bergman felt that the novel "illuminat[ed] the ways we're stuck in the past, living in a world fundamentally shaped by the wars that are constantly intruding on DeWitt and Gridneff's text".

Like Jenny Turner in her 2008 review, Derek Robertson in the Washington Examiner felt that Gridneff's emails did not justify DeWitt's level of appreciation: "[his] provocative, hyperkinetic style will be familiar, and often tiresome, to anyone who's spent the past two decades in the trenches of the blogosphere and internet forums." Nevertheless, he concluded that "befitting a writer of DeWitt’s talent and genius, there are genuine wonders to carry even the story-craving plebeian through the book". In particular, he praised the novel's prose, comic timing, and portrayal of depression.
