= My Back Pages: Reviews and Essays =

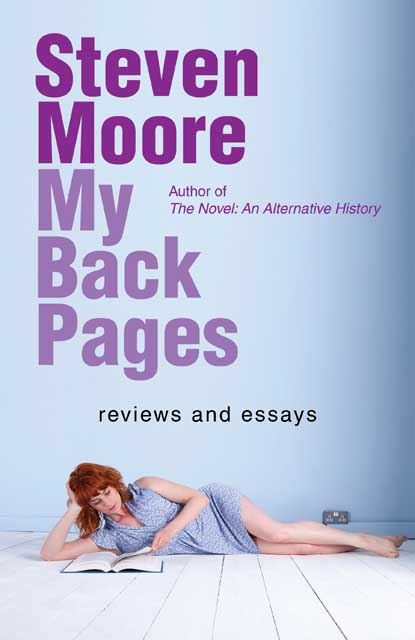
- first edition cover
- Author: Steven Moore
- Language: English
- Genre: Essays, Reviews, Literary Criticism, Postmodernism
- Publisher: Zerogram Press
- Publication date: 2017
- Publication place: United States of America
- Media type: Print
- Pages: 767
- ISBN: 9781557134370

My Back Pages: Reviews and Essays by Steven Moore (Zerogram Press, 2017) is a collection of book reviews that were originally published in periodicals from the late 1970s onward.

The book is named after "My Back Pages", a song by Bob Dylan.

Moore is considered the leading authority on William Gaddis. He also writes about helping David Foster Wallace edit Infinite Jest.

Topics covered by this book are literary criticism, postmodernism, the Beat Generation, maximalism, gay literature, punctuation, nympholepsy, and the history of the novel.

== Release details ==
- 2017, Zerogram Press, Hardback
- 2018, Zerogram Press, Paperback (corrected, expanded edition)
