= Madam Secretary (book) =

2003 memoir by Madeleine Albright

- First edition
- Author: Madeleine Albright
- Language: English
- Genre: Autobiography, memoir
- Publisher: Miramax Books
- Publication date: 2003
- Publication place: United States
- Media type: Hardcover
- Pages: 562
- ISBN: 978-1-4013-9947-4
- OCLC: 439810833
- Text: Madam Secretary at Internet Archive

Madam Secretary: A Memoir is the autobiography of United States Secretary of State Madeleine Albright, published in 2003. It covers both her life and the eight years she spent in the Clinton administration, first as United States Ambassador to the United Nations and then as head of the State Department. The book's title reflects the term of address for a female governmental secretary. Madam Secretary appeared on The New York Times Best Seller list.
