= Middle C (novel) =

2013 novel by William H. Gass

- First edition cover
- Author: William H. Gass
- Language: English
- Genre: Postmodern Bildungsroman
- Published: 2013 (Knopf)
- Publication place: United States
- Media type: Print (Hardback)
- Pages: 395
- ISBN: 978-0-307-70163-3

Middle C is a 2013 novel by William H. Gass. Gass started writing it sometime after 1998, with a first excerpt appearing in 2001.

The novel tells the story and concerns of Joseph Skizzen, whose father got the family out of Austria in 1938, pretending to be Jewish, then disappeared in London. Relocated with his mother and sister to the fictional Woodbine, Ohio, Skizzen grows up to be a thoroughly middling nobody, a low-skilled amateur piano player who finds his niche as a professor of music at a small Bible college, by passing himself off as just the right kind of exotic, specializing in Arnold Schoenberg and atonal music, and successfully lying about his training and credentials. Isolated, he lives with his mother, his only hobby a fantasy life as the curator of his Inhumanity Museum. He obsesses over revising a single sentence, "The fear that the human race might not survive has been replaced by the fear that it will endure."

One review described the novel as being written in a style imitative of Schoenberg, with no scene having more dramatic significance than any other. Another review compared the novel to a concerto, with parts for Joey, Joseph, and Professor Skizzen. It won the William Dean Howells Medal in 2015.

== Plot summary ==
The novel has two main threads: a bildungsroman describing the life of Joseph Skizzen, and Skizzen's own private philosophical meditations on how horrible humanity is. In addition, there are a few separate scenes from Skizzen's life, including two lectures on contemporary music to freshman, and conversations with his mother about gardening.

In the late 1930s, the Austrian Rudi Skizzen decides the current situation with Nazi Germany is only going to get worse, and decides to escape to London with his pregnant wife and young daughter. He successfully passes off his family as Jewish refugees, changing the family name to Fixel, his to Yankel. His son Yussel Fixel is born in London, and grows up with memories of the Blitz. Having made it to London, Yankel Fixel changes his name to Raymond Scofield, the better to blend in with the British. Having won a surprise payoff at the racetrack, he and the money disappear. The police cannot tell whether he was killed by criminals or if he bought himself yet another identity and emigrated.

After the war, the remaining Fixel family is relocated to America, ending up in the small town of Woodbine, Ohio. The family name reverts to Skizzen, with Yussel becoming Joey or Joseph, his mother keeping the name Miriam, and his sister becoming Deborah. In high school, Joey scrapes along as a mediocre student, and learns to play the piano passably. He develops a low-key interest in classical music, and works at a record store. Facing theft charges, he quits, and attends Augsburg Community College, which despite its name, was a Lutheran private college, not a "community college".

Joey spends two years at Augsburg, but quits after his French teacher clumsily tries to seduce him, and the rector forbids him from playing the organ part-time at his mother's Catholic church. He takes a job at the nearby Urichstown public library, buying a run-down car, forging a learner's permit for himself. He lives during the week in the librarian's converted garage. A load of donated books awakens an interest in contemporary music. But after some time, the librarian tries to seduce him, fails badly, and Joey finds himself evicted.

Moving back with his mother, Joseph assumes a teaching position at Whitterbauer College, located in Woodbine, and also a Christian college. He publishes two short articles on Schoenberg, finds himself tenured and given a house. Over the decades that follow, he works on his "Inhumanity Museum", the top floor of the house, with articles on man's inhumanity to man all over the walls and flypapered to the ceiling. His mother becomes a serious amateur gardener. Joseph successfully passes himself off as a slightly eccentric Austrian born and raised expert on 20th-century music.

The novel culminates in an ethics committee faculty meeting, whose high point is the exposure of a fraud amongst them. Joseph had been convinced he was going to be named, and is surprised and relieved that someone else is revealed. He is genuinely happy, seemingly for the first time in his life, but he is not able to share his happiness with anyone, not even his mother. The novel ends with Joseph in the house, his mother outside, Joseph waiting for her to come in, since "she couldn't cultivate her garden forever," a direct allusion to the end of Candide.

== Character summary ==
Joseph/Joey Skizzen is the only important character. He lives a life of mediocrity and petty fakeries, culminating in pretending to have been born and raised in Vienna, the son of a second violinist for the philharmonic. Part of his adopted persona is an alleged interest in the music of Schoenberg, confident that the right people will be impressed and that no one will be able to call him out.

=== The Skizzen/Fixel/Scofield family ===
Joseph Skizzen
Joey, born in London as Yussel Fixel.
Miriam Skizzen
Joey's mother, born Nita Rouse, married Rudi, changed her name to Miriam Fixel, refused to change to Mary Scofield. In her later years, a serious amateur gardener.
Rudi Skizzen
Joey's father, could play a fiddle, changed his name to Yankel Fixel, then to Raymond Scofield, disappeared after a big win at the races.
Deborah (Skizzen) Boulder
Joey's sister, born Trudi Skizzen, changed to Dvorah Fixel, then Deborah Scofied, then Deborah Skizzen. (Note: p. 110.)
Roger Boulder
Deborah's husband. (Note: p. 111.)

=== Early Woodbine acquaintances ===
Miss Lasswell
Joey's first piano teacher.
Mr. Hirk
Joey's second piano teacher.
Emil and Millicent Kazan
Proprietors of the High Note, a record store.
Castle Cairfill
Joey's co-worker at the High Note.
Mr. Tippet
Organ player at Saint Agatha's, a Catholic church.

=== Augsburg Community College people ===
Madame Mieux
French teacher.
Dr. Gunter Luthardts
Rector.

=== Urichstown acquaintances ===
Hazel Hawkins
Strange, obese widow who mothers her teddy bear, runs several dumps, sells Joey his car, and sings for her church.
Miss Marjorie Bruss
Librarian, called the "Major" by Miss Moss, rents her garage to Joey.
Miss Moss
Assistant librarian.
Portho
Street person, hangs out in the library.

=== Whittlebauer people ===
Howard Palfrey
President.
Miss Gwynne Withers
Palfrey's niece, a singer, soon married to Herbert Kleger, a pianist.
Miss Hazel Hazlet
Librarian.
Franklyn Funk
Dean. (Note: p. 349.)
Clarence Carfagno
Professor of Music, at some point deceased.
Morton Rinse
Professor of Music.
Andrew "Kit" Carson
Professor of History. (Note: p. 349.)
Steve Smullion
Professor of Biology, author of Biology for Babies. (Note: p. 349. The title is perhaps Skizzen's sarcastic name for Biology for Believers, p. 100.)
Frederick Maine
Former local farmer, early donor to Whittlebauer, including the house Skizzen and his mother live in.

== Reception ==
In this exuberantly learned bildungsroman ... internationally lauded virtuoso Gass reflects on humanity's crimes and marvels, creating his funniest and most life-embracing book yet.

— Donna Seaman, Booklist, 2/15/2013

Gass beautifully coaxes the unheard music from a seemingly muted life.

— Lynn Nesbit, Publishers Weekly, 1/14/2013

Gass remains a master of apt metaphors, graceful sentences and a flinty, unforgiving brand of humor; it may be the most entertaining novel you'll read that half wishes humanity was wiped off the map.

— -, Kirkus Reviews, 3/12/2013
