= Omensetter's Luck =

1966 novel by William H. Gass

- Cover of first edition
- Author: William H. Gass
- Language: English
- Genre: Novel
- Publisher: New American Library
- Publication date: 1966
- Publication place: United States
- Media type: Print
- Pages: 336 pp

Omensetter's Luck is the first novel by William H. Gass, published in 1966.

== Writing and publication ==
Gass began writing Omensetter's Luck around 1954. He was working on the last chapter of the novel in 1958 when the manuscript was stolen off his desk, forcing him to begin rewriting the book from scratch. He says of this time, "I was in a funk, a kind of fugue state. I reconstructed the book by working almost nonstop for about six months." The novel was eventually published in 1966 and has gone through many editions, both foreign and domestic, and remains in print today.

== Plot ==
Omensetter's Luck takes place in the 1890s in the fictitious town of Gilean, Ohio. The story is bookended by the story of Brackett Omensetter who arrives with his family to settle down. The middle (and the bulk) of the novel is devoted to the spiritual and mental degradation of the town's priest, Jethro Furber, who is jealous of Omensetter's magnetic personality and the luck that seems to underpin Omensetter's existence.

After a meeting to receive his monthly rent, Omensetter's landlord, Henry Pimber, disappears and is found much later, dead. Omensetter's luck changes soon after, forcing him to abandon Gilean, leaving the locals to question the role of Omensetter in Pimber's death.

== Style ==
Omensetter's Luck employs many literary techniques associated with the modernist literary movement, such as the inclusion of several unreliable narrators and the use of stream of consciousness. The novel is structured in three sections: "The Triumph of Israbestis Tott," "The Love and Sorrow of Henry Pimber," and "The Reverend Jethro Furber's Change of Heart," each of which is narrated in the third person. The Jethro Furber section, which is told in stream of consciousness and takes up the majority of the novel, is reported by many readers to be the most difficult section to follow.

In a Paris Review interview, Gass said, "When I first wrote the book, Furber wasn't even in it," and that it was only after rewrites that "Furber began to emerge. The book began to be the book I should have been writing all along. Now, a lot of people find that the Furber section is where the book goes to hell. As far as I am concerned, it is the only justification for that book."

== Reception ==
In his Salon article naming five overlooked American novels written after 1960, novelist David Foster Wallace called Omensetter's Luck Gass's "least avant-gardeish, and his best." And Susan Sontag wrote, "William Gass has written an extraordinary, stunning, beautiful book. I admire him and it very much."
