= William Dean Howells Medal =

Literary award

The William Dean Howells Medal is awarded by the American Academy of Arts and Letters. Established in 1925 and named for William Dean Howells, it is given once every five years, generally in recognition of the most distinguished American novel published during that period, although some awards have been made to novelists for their general body of work. The recipient of the award is chosen, by a committee drawn from the membership of the Academy, from among those candidates nominated by a member of the Academy.

== Past winners ==
Year	Author	Book
1925	Mary E. Wilkins Freeman	
1930	Willa Cather	Death Comes for the Archbishop
1935	Pearl S. Buck	The Good Earth
1940	Ellen Glasgow	
1945	Booth Tarkington	
1950	William Faulkner	
1955	Eudora Welty	The Ponder Heart
1960	James Gould Cozzens	By Love Possessed
1965	John Cheever	The Wapshot Scandal
1970	William Styron	The Confessions of Nat Turner
1975	Thomas Pynchon (declined)	Gravity's Rainbow
1980	William Maxwell	So Long, See You Tomorrow
1985	No award	
1990	E. L. Doctorow	Billy Bathgate
1995	John Updike	Rabbit at Rest
2000	Don DeLillo	Underworld
2005	Shirley Hazzard	The Great Fire
2010	Peter Matthiessen	Shadow Country
2015	William H. Gass	Middle C
2020	Richard Powers	The Overstory
2025	Louise Erdrich	The Night Watchman
