= Miramax Books =

American publishing company

- Founded: 1979; 47 years ago
- Founder: Bob and Harvey Weinstein
- Country of origin: United States
- Headquarters location: New York City, New York, U.S.
- Key people: Jonathan Burnham; Rob Weisbach
- Official website: www.miramaxbooks.com

Miramax Books is an American publishing company started by Bob and Harvey Weinstein of Miramax Films to publish movie tie-ins. Between 2000 and 2005, while Jonathan Burnham was its president and editor-in-chief, the imprint published the memoirs of many major celebrities, including Farah Pahlavi, David Boies, Madeleine Albright, Rudy Giuliani, and Tim Russert, as well as Helen DeWitt's The Last Samurai. It later published the first three books of Rick Riordan's Percy Jackson & the Olympians series.

Burnham was appointed in December 1998, planning to publish 10 to 15 books a year, both fiction and non-fiction, starting in 2000. Between 2000 and 2002, it was a division of Miramax's Talk Media, known as Talk Miramax Books. Tina Brown, chair of Talk Media, recruited a number of high-profile authors for the imprint, such as historian Simon Schama and British novelist Martin Amis. Rudy Giuliani was paid $3 million in advance for his autobiography (prior to 9/11). By April 2002, Talk Miramax had published 30 books, five of which had made national bestseller lists. The unit generated $10 million in revenue in 2001 and was profitable.

After Brown left Talk Media in 2002, it was again renamed Miramax Books. In 2004, Miramax Books won the auction for Riordan's The Lightning Thief manuscript.

When the Weinsteins left Disney in 2005, five years before Miramax Films was sold, they retained partial ownership of Miramax Books under a joint operating agreement ending September 30, 2007. CEO Rob Weisbach oversaw both Miramax Books and Weinstein Books, while Disney executives Robert Miller and Deborah Dugan acquired new titles. The Weinsteins kept a financial stake in books scheduled for publication between April 2005 and September 2007.

== Bestsellers ==
- Martin Amis: Experience (2000)
- Helen DeWitt: The Last Samurai (2000)
- Jerri Nielsen (with Maryanne Vollers): Ice Bound: A Doctor's Incredible Battle for Survival at the South Pole (2001)
- Rudy Giuliani: Leadership (2002)
- Queen Noor of Jordan: Leap of Faith: Memoirs of an Unexpected Life (2003)
- Madeleine Albright: Madam Secretary (2003)
- Plum Sykes: Bergdorf Blondes (2004)
- Tim Russert: Big Russ and Me (2004)
