= The Last Samurai (novel) =

Novel by Helen DeWitt

- First edition
- Author: Helen DeWitt
- Language: English
- Publisher: Talk Miramax Books (2000) Chatto & Windus (2000) New Directions (2016)
- Publication date: September 2000
- Publication place: United States
- Media type: Print (hardback and paperback)
- Pages: 530 pp
- ISBN: 0-7868-6668-3
- OCLC: 43391103
- Dewey Decimal: 813/.6 21
- LC Class: PS3554.E92945 S48 2000

The Last Samurai (2000) is the first novel by American writer Helen DeWitt. It follows a single mother and her young son, a child prodigy, who embarks on a quest to find his father. Despite selling well and garnering critical acclaim on publication, it was out of print for almost a decade; when reissued in 2016, it received renewed praise and accolades.

DeWitt had found the publication process to be a struggle: there were typesetting problems arising from her use of foreign text, an "accounting error" that led to her owing a publisher $75,000 when she thought they owed her $80,000, and a struggle with obtaining the rights for the book's original title, The Seven Samurai (a reference to the Akira Kurosawa film featured in the book), forcing her to change the title only to see it be used for a Hollywood film starring Tom Cruise.

== Plot ==
The Last Samurai is about the relationship between a single mother, Sibylla, and her son, Ludo, who live together in a small flat in London where Sibylla, an American immigrant, works as a freelance typist. From a young age Ludo proves to be gifted: he starts reading at two, reading Homer in the original Greek at three, and goes on to Hebrew, Japanese, Old Norse, Inuit, and advanced mathematics. As a substitute for a male influence in his upbringing, Sibylla plays him Akira Kurosawa's Seven Samurai, which he comes to know by heart.

The next portion of the novel describes Ludo at age eleven, with no formal schooling and the only social interaction he has coming from his participation in a judo class in which his mother has enrolled him. After meeting his biological father, whom he deems undeserving due to his lack of genuine intellect, he devotes his time to the pursuit of various potential fathers. Ludo interacts with several adult male geniuses, testing each to see if they would make a good candidate to be his father.

== Critical reception and legacy ==
The Last Samurai received enthusiastic reviews when originally published in 2000, and sold over 100,000 copies. However, the book then fell out of print for over a decade. In a review in The New Yorker from 2000, A. S. Byatt said of the novel, "A triumph – a genuinely new story, and genuinely new form." Myla Goldberg, writing in The New York Times the same year, said, "Though the book worships too long at the altar of the intellect, her intelligence provides sparkle as well as promise."

In June 2016, New Directions reissued the novel. Retrospective reviews hailed it as a neglected modern classic. Anne Meadows, writing in Granta, ranked it as the best book of 2000. A 2018 article in New York named The Last Samurai as the novel of the century. In the piece Christian Lorentzen wrote, "The Last Samurai is, in a few ways, an instruction manual. It contains an ethics of living and learning, but it also attempts to tell its readers how to learn and to show them that they can learn things that they might have thought beyond their grasp." The Guardian called it a "bizarre, bold, brilliant book." The Millions had similar sentiments: "So if The Last Samurai belongs to a genre of books that perpetuate a seductive fantasy about the nature of intelligence, then it’s the best example of that genre I’ve ever seen."

In 2024 The New York Times named The Last Samurai to its list of the "100 Best Books of the 21st Century". It was voted for by author Jonathan Lethem and appeared at #29 in the list. Critic A. O. Scott called the book a "funny, cruel, compassionate, typographically bananas novel" and wrote that the answer to the question, "who is the real genius?" is the book's author, Helen DeWitt.

== Awards and nominations ==
The novel was shortlisted for the International Dublin Literary Award and Art Seidenbaum Award for First Fiction, and was longlisted for the Orange Prize for Fiction.

Year	Award	Category	Result	Ref.
2001	Los Angeles Times Book Prize	Art Seidenbaum Award for First Fiction	Shortlisted	
2001	Orange Prize for Fiction	—	Longlisted	
2002	International Dublin Literary Award	—	Shortlisted	
