= Chromos =

1990 novel by Felipe Alfau

First edition

Chromos is the second novel of Spanish-born American writer Felipe Alfau (1902–1999), written in 1948 and published in 1990.

== Composition and publication ==
Alfau described how he wrote the novel: "In the office between one document and another, I would write a paragraph or two. I then pasted together the whole book, as in a collage." He completed it in 1948, but not published until 1990 when Dalkey Archive Press released the first edition.

== Reception and legacy ==
The novel was nominated for a National Book Award in 1990.

Chromos had an influence on the works of fellow Spanish-American writer Eduardo Lago, whose Llámame Brooklyn shares stylistic, structural, and thematic similarities with Alfau's novel, such as a novel-within-a-novel.
