= Darconville's Cat =

1981 novel by Alexander Theroux

- First edition
- Author: Alexander Theroux
- Cover artist: Alexander Theroux, first edition
- Language: English
- Genre: Novel
- Publisher: Doubleday, later Henry Holt and Company (1996)
- Publication date: 1981
- Publication place: United States
- Media type: Print (hardback and paperback)
- Pages: 704
- ISBN: 978-0-8050-4365-5

Darconville's Cat is the second novel by Alexander Theroux, first published in 1981. The main story is a love affair between Alaric Darconville, an English professor at a Virginia women's college, and Isabel, one of his students, but includes long sections on other topics, including a general satire of the world of American academics.

The story is said to be based on Theroux's years of teaching at Longwood University, and places described in the book are easily recognized buildings on the campus.

The image on the first edition is a self-portrait drawn by the author.

== Plot summary ==
Twenty-nine year old Alaric Darconville takes a position as an English instructor at Quinsy College, a women's college at Quinsyburg, Virginia. Born in New England, he is the descendant of notable nobility with a French and Italian pedigree, among them a Pierre Christophe Cardinal Theroux-d'Arconville (a chapter is devoted to him) and Marie Genevieve Charlotte Theroux-d'Arconville (p. 234). His parents died when he was 14. He joins first the Franciscan, then the Trappist brotherhood, but does not fit in. Instead, he discovers a passion for words and writing and is further encouraged in his aspiration to become a writer by his grandmother when he moves to her house in Venice. Upon her death she leaves him a cat, Spellvexit, some money, and her old palazzo that eventually, after protracted legal proceedings, he will own. He now has returned to the States to earn a living. Quinsyburg is a small town in the backwater of the South –"nothing surrounded by nowhere" (p. 13).

In his class he encounters a beautiful 18-year old freshman, Isabel Rawthorne, and falls in love with her. With a "low degree" family background she hails from Fawx's Mt., Virginia. The romance blossoms, but there are consequences. Isabel fails in her freshman year and has to leave Quinsy, taking a position as a telephone operator in Charlottesville. The romance has also interfered with the writing of his book, Rumpopulorum, "a grimoire, in the old style" (p. 5) dealing with angels and similar metaphysical entities and their relation to man. He ventures to London for research, and he invites Isabel for a visit; during their time together in London, they become engaged. Back in Virginia, she reenters Quinsy and he continues his teaching job. After he has published his book, he gets an offer to teach at Harvard, while Isabel has finished her studies. He wants to accept the job and move, but she is reluctant and afraid that he might leave her eventually. He offers to marry her. However, when he moves to Harvard, she stays behind, postpones the marriage date, and is harder and harder to reach. Eventually, Darconville travels to Fawx's Mt. to confront her. At this point, Spellvexit runs away. Darconville learns that Isabel does not care for him anymore. She has found a new lover, a son of the well-to-do van der Slang family of Dutch background she had known since childhood. He is desperate. Back at Harvard, he falls under the spell of Dr. Crucifer, a satanic sophist and misogynist who abrogated his sex as not to fall under the spell of a woman. Crucifer works on Darconville turning his love for Isabel into hate. He urges him to seek revenge convincing him that Isabel is not only worthless but needs to die. Darconville sets out to kill her at Fawx's Mt.

After this experience Darconville retreats to Venice where in his palazzo he is able to use "remembrance" to write his ultimate work. He realizes the importance of memory. "All forgetfulness... was in itself immoral, for the permanence with which experiences stay with a man is proportional to the significance they had for him: memory must be preserved from time" (p. 677). The past becomes the "playground" of the artist. Neglected, coughing blood, and shivering from fever he suffers from a progressive debilitating lung disease. Aware that his time is running out he rushes to finish the work before he dies. The unnamed manuscript boxed in a tin can is handed to his uncaring physician in lieu of payment.

== Style ==
The novel displays Theroux's love of words and mastery of language, – it is as Victor Howes puts it, "a potpourri of language, a torrent of verbalism, a feast of vocabularies". The reader will encounter countless new and unknown words, but "(u)se your definitionary ... It is one of the last few pleasures left in life," so the advice of the protagonist when trying to teach the class about Keats' Bright Star (p. 56). Darconville's Cat has been named a work of "obvious excess" and "a literary game of the Nabokovian kind". Thus, its catalogues of books may contain real and fictive works for the reader to find out. The novel contains 100 chapters of all forms of style including essay, diary, poem, sermon, invocation, satire, fable, travelogue, catalogue, meditation, list, precis, and pages mirrored or black.

== Reception ==
Patrick O'Donnell calls it a "largely ignored masterpiece". The novel was included by Anthony Burgess in his book-length essay Ninety-Nine Novels: The Best in English Since 1939. It was also nominated for a National Book Award and made the Good Reads list of the 100 Top Literary Novels of All Time. In his review, Stuart Mitchner also indicates that the book is very difficult to read. James Wolcott, writing in the New York Review of Books echoes this sentiment: "To fidgety readers, the 700-plus pages of Darconville's Cat may seem as long as the Trojan War", but he also calls the book "sly and resourceful."

Tom LeClair calls it a book of "obvious excess" and Steven Moore places it in the genre of "huge, erudite novels". Victor Howes, writing in the Christian Science Monitor, states: "Yes, this is a hobbyhorse of a novel. Hobbyhorsical. Some will love it. Others will hate it. Like Darconville's only love – Isabel Rawsthorne (rosethorn, raw as thorn) – it both satisfies and disappoints. It needs pruning, but would suffer from the shears."

In Book Lust, Nancy Pearl calls it "a verbal tour de force" and says the book highlights the author's "almost perverse infatuation with language." Doug Nufer writes that "(w)ith its dazzling vocabulary, play of different voices, and a profusion of forms, Darconville's Cat is a 700-page showcase of ornate and meticulous syntax, in a variety of styles and modes, mixing the natural with the supernatural and romantic fantasy with cynical satire".

In Signs of the Literary Times, William O'Rourke discusses Darconville's Cat which came out at the same time as O'Rourke's Idle Hands. Among the many literary references in Darconville's Cat, O'Rourke sees several bits, including the final sentence, which O'Rourke believes were inspired by Edward Dahlberg's works, and questions why Dahlberg is not included in Theroux's list of acknowledgments.
