= Zerogram Press =

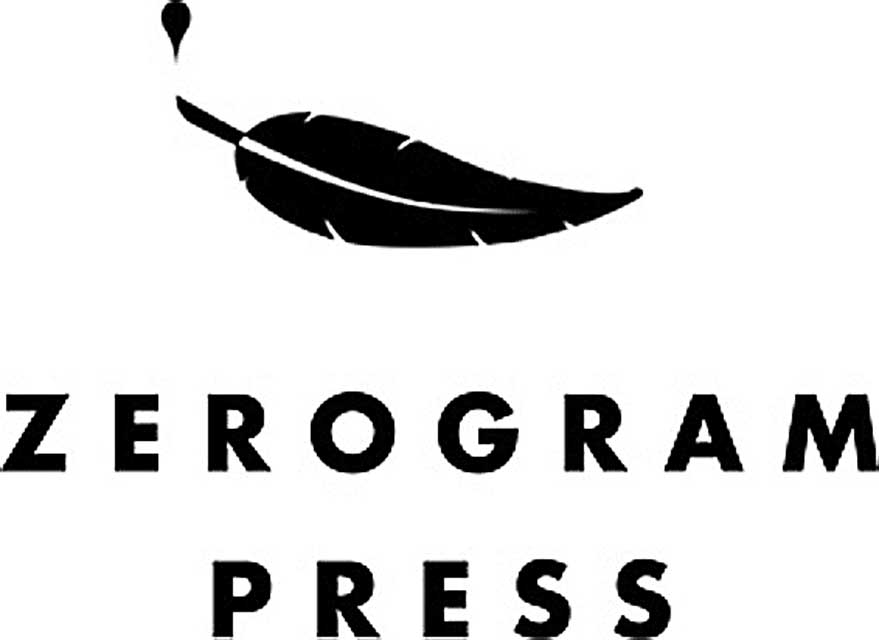
- Founded: 2016
- Headquarters location: Los Angeles, USA
- Distribution: Ingram
- Publication types: Books
- Fiction genres: Contemporary Literary Fiction, Literary Criticism
- Official website: zerogrampress.com

Zerogram Press is dedicated to publishing contemporary literary fiction written in English. It also publishes literary criticism and essays.

It was founded in 2016.

== Books ==
- Novel Explosives by Jim Gauer (2016)
- My Back Pages: Reviews and Essays by Steven Moore (2017)
- Alexander Theroux: A Fan's Notes by Steven Moore (2020)
- Panthers and the Museum of Fire by Jen Craig (2020)
- See What I See: Essays by Greg Gerke (2021)
- Hang Him When He Is Not There by Nicholas John Turner (2021)
- Doom Town by Gabriel Blackwell (2022)
- A World with No Shore by Hélène Gaudy, Translated from the French by Stephanie Smee (2022)
- American Stutter: 2019–2021 by Steve Erickson (2022)
- The Manifold Destiny of Eddie Vegas Rick Harsch (2022)
