= Ingrid Kerma =

German artist

- Born: 1942 (age 83–84); Berlin

Ingrid Kerma (born 1942) is a German artist.

She was born in Eberswalde, near Berlin in 1942 and went on to study at Reading University from 1972 to 1976, then at Goldsmiths, University of London. She divides her time between London and Berlin. Furthermore, she has exhibited her work throughout Europe, as well as in Los Angeles.

In the late 1970s her paintings consisted of large scale geometric forms. In the next decade she moved towards greater abstraction, although still based on the human figure. She briefly flirted with Neo-expressionism. Following a two-years Master of Fine Arts course at Goldsmiths College in the early 1990s, Kerma explored monochrome and near-monochrome painting. Encaustic remains her favoured medium. Other modes include the use of pure pigment and pouring paint onto the canvas.

Kerma's work is held in the permanent collections of the Arts Council Collection at Southbank Centre and the University of Reading.
