= William H. Gass =

American fiction writer, critic, philosophy professor (1924–2017)

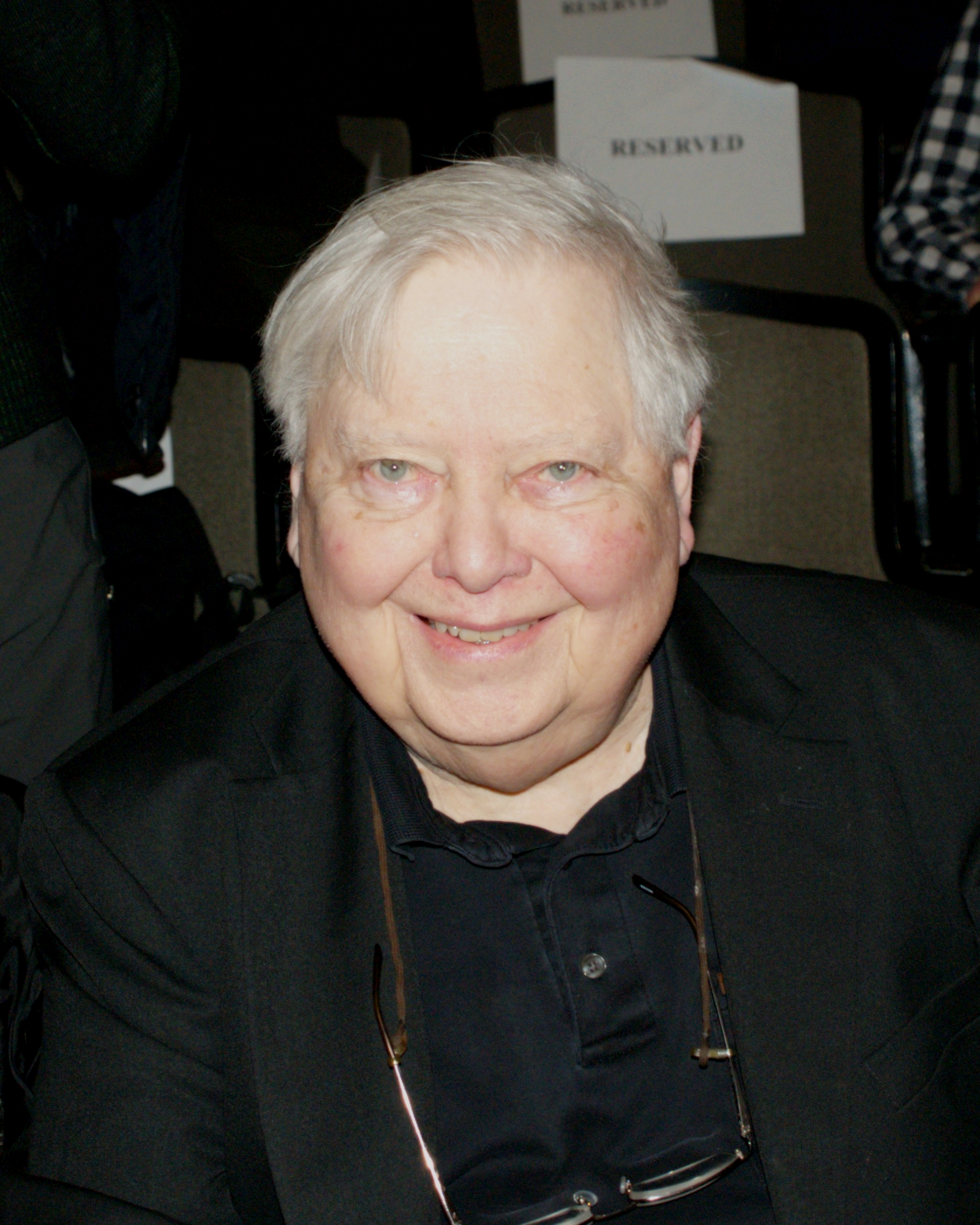
- Gass at the 2010 National Book Critics Circle awards
- Born: William Howard Gass; July 30, 1924; Fargo, North Dakota, U.S.
- Died: December 6, 2017 (aged 93); University City, Missouri, U.S.
- Education: Kenyon College (AB); Cornell University (PhD)
- Occupations: Short story writer; novelist; essayist; critic; philosophy professor
- Writing career
- Period: 1959–2017
- Genres: Creative nonfiction, metafiction
- Notable works: The Tunnel, A Temple of Texts, Middle C
- Movements: Postmodernism, metafiction

William Howard Gass (July 30, 1924 – December 6, 2017) was an American novelist, short story writer, essayist, critic, and philosophy professor. He wrote three novels, three collections of short stories, a collection of novellas, and seven volumes of essays, three of which won National Book Critics Circle Award prizes and one of which, A Temple of Texts (2006), won the Truman Capote Award for Literary Criticism. His 1995 novel The Tunnel received the American Book Award. His 2013 novel Middle C won the 2015 William Dean Howells Medal.

== Early life and education ==
William Howard Gass was born on July 30, 1924, in Fargo, North Dakota. Soon after his birth, his family moved to Warren, Ohio, a steel town, where he attended local schools. He described his childhood as an unhappy one, with an abusive, racist father and a passive, alcoholic mother; critics would later cite his characters as having these same qualities. His father had been trained as an architect but, while serving during the First World War, had sustained back injuries that forced him to take a job as a high school drafting and architectural drawing teacher. His mother was a housewife.

As a boy, Gass read anything he could get his hands on. From The Shadow to The History of the French Revolution, Gass read constantly, although there were no bookstores in the town of Warren. Later he would claim that the advent of "pocketbooks" saved his literary life. He'd save up all the money he earned or obtained and, every two weeks, head down and buy as many pocketbooks as he could afford. Even though Gass was always a reader, his father disapproved of his aspirations and often berated him for it.

He attended Ohio Wesleyan University after graduating from Warren G. Harding High School, where he did very well, except for some difficulties in mathematics, then served as an ensign in the Navy during World War II for three and a half years, a period he described as perhaps the worst of his life. He earned his A.B. magna cum laude in philosophy from Kenyon College (1947), where he was elected to Phi Beta Kappa. From there he entered Cornell University as a Susan Linn Fellow in Philosophy and, by 1954, had earned his PhD in that subject. While at Cornell, he studied under Max Black and, briefly, Ludwig Wittgenstein. His dissertation, "A Philosophical Investigation of Metaphor", was based on his training as a philosopher of language. In graduate school, Gass read the work of Gertrude Stein, who influenced his writing. He named the twelve most influential books of his life: Samuel Taylor Coleridge's Biographia Literaria, Virginia Woolf's Diaries, Ford Madox Ford's Parade's End, James Joyce's Ulysses, Thomas Mann's The Magic Mountain, Franz Kafka's A Country Doctor and Other Stories, Gustave Flaubert's Letters, Colette's Break of Day, W. B. Yeats's The Tower, William Faulkner's The Sound and the Fury, Stein's Three Lives and William Gaddis's The Recognitions.

== Teaching ==
Gass taught at The College of Wooster for four years, Purdue University for sixteen years, and Washington University in St. Louis, where he was a professor of philosophy (1969–1978) and the David May Distinguished University Professor in the Humanities (1979–1999). His colleagues there included the writers Stanley Elkin, Howard Nemerov (1988 Poet Laureate of the United States), and Mona Van Duyn (1992 Poet Laureate). After 2000, Gass was the David May Distinguished University Professor Emeritus in the Humanities.

== Personal life ==
In 1952, before graduating from Cornell, he married Mary Pat O'Kelly. The marriage ended in divorce. He had two sons and a daughter with his first wife: Richard, Robert and Susan.

Gass later married architect Mary Henderson Gass, author of Parkview: A St. Louis Urban Oasis (2005). They had twin daughters, Catherine and Elizabeth Gass-Boshoven. Catherine is an artist teaching at The School of the Art Institute of Chicago and is a photographer for the Newberry Library.

== Writing and publications ==
Earning a living for himself and his family from university teaching, Gass began to publish stories that were selected for inclusion in The Best American Short Stories of 1959, 1961, 1962, 1968 and 1980, as well as Two Hundred Years of Great American Short Stories. His debut novel, Omensetter's Luck, about life in a small town in Ohio in the 1890s, was published in 1966. Critics praised his linguistic virtuosity, establishing him as an important writer of fiction. Richard Gilman in The New Republic called it "the most important work of fiction by an American in this literary generation." In 1968 he published In the Heart of the Heart of the Country, five stories dramatizing the theme of human isolation and the difficulty of love. That same year Gass published Willie Masters' Lonesome Wife, an experimental novella illustrated with photographs and typographical constructs intended to help readers free themselves from the linear conventions of narrative. He also published several collections of essays, including Fiction and the Figures of Life (1970) and Finding a Form (1996). Cartesian Sonata and Other Novellas was published in 1998, and his novel Middle C was published in 2013. His work also appeared in The Best American Essays collections of 1986, 1992, and 2000.

Gass cited the anger he felt during his childhood as a major influence on his work, even stating that he wrote "to get even." Despite his prolific output, he said that writing was difficult for him. In fact, his epic novel The Tunnel, published in 1995, took Gass 26 years to write. On the subject of his slow and methodic pace he said, "I write slowly because I write badly. I have to rewrite everything many, many times just to achieve mediocrity."

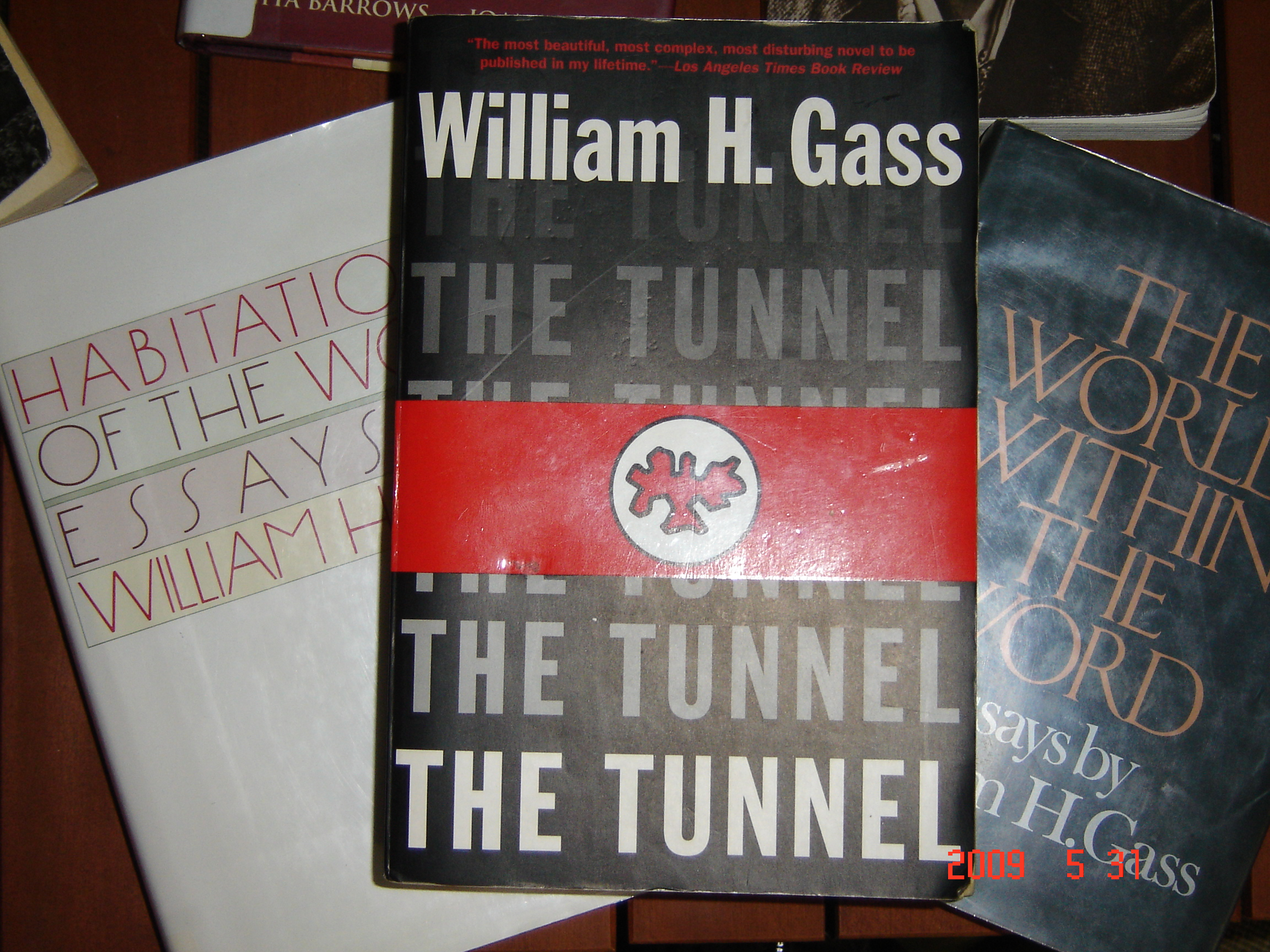
A paperback copy of William H. Gass' controversial novel The Tunnel on top of two of his collections of essays: "Habitations of the Word" and "The World Within the Word"

Critical responses to The Tunnel upon its release included Robert Kelly's declaration that it was an "infuriating and offensive masterpiece," and Steven Moore's claim that it was ”a stupendous achievement and obviously one of the greatest novels of the century.” Michael Silverblatt of the Los Angeles Times wrote in his review of the novel: "A bleak, black book, it engenders awe and despair. I have read it in its entirety 4½ times, each time finding its resonance and beauty so great as to demand another reading. As I read, I found myself devastated by the thoroughness of the book's annihilating sensibility and revived by the beauty of its language, the complexity of its design, the melancholy, horror and stoic sympathy in its rendering of what we used to call the human condition." Gass, in reference to the harsh and disquieting nature of The Tunnel said "I don't think anything is sacred and therefore I am prepared to extol or make fun of anything. People who have very settled opinions are going to dislike this book because Kohler [the main character] is the worm inside all that stuff." An unabridged audio version of The Tunnel was released in 2006, with Gass reading the novel himself.

Gass typically devoted enormous attention to sentence construction. His prose has been described as flashy, difficult, edgy, masterful, inventive, and musical. Steven Moore, writing in The Washington Post, called Gass "the finest prose stylist in America." Much of Gass's work is metafictional. In an interview with Anglistik Gass commented on the subject of his genre- and form-defying works, laughing off the title "Postmodern", and coining himself "Late" or "Decayed Modern".

Shortly before his death, Gass finished a short nonfiction work entitled Baroque Prose. Its first chapter was published in issue 4 (2022) of the online journal Socrates on the Beach, and its second chapter in issue 84 of Conjunctions (Spring 2025).

== Gass's opinion of metaphor ==
Though much of Gass's central aesthetic has remained constant, there have been gradual shifts in his views of metaphor and ontology of the text. His view of metaphor is far more expansive than that proposed in his dissertation [A Philosophical Investigation of Metaphor]. Gass tells LeClair that "[m]etaphor has been thought to be a pet of language, a peculiar relation between subject and predicate ... [b]ut you can make metaphors by juxtaposing objects and in lots of other ways" (The Paris Review). In other words, metaphor need not be a purely linguistic matter, and perhaps not surprisingly Gass's change in his explanation of metaphor from graduate school to now signals a change in the focus of his fiction. As noted earlier Gass claims to construct self-contained systems of ideas, but in these interviews, one can trace a growing concern with the relationship of his fiction to the world, as he makes clear to LeClair: "I've been principally interested in establishing the relationship between fiction and the world. If we can see that relationship as a metaphorical one, then we are already several steps in the direction of our models."

== Major works ==
=== Omensetter's Luck (1966) ===
In this debut novel, William Gass details characters in a small town in rural Ohio during the 1890s and their reaction to the presence of a man named Brackett Omensetter whose confrontations with the crazed Reverend Jethro Furber galvanize the community. Harper's described it as "A rich fever, a parade of secrets, delirious, tormented, terrifying, comic...one of the most exciting, energetic and beautiful novels we can ever hope to read."

=== The Tunnel (1995) ===
The Tunnel is a novel about a man named William Frederick Kohler and his attempt to write an introduction to his historical magnum opus, "Guilt and Innocence in Hitler's Germany." But when Kohler tries to flesh out this minor introduction, mostly for the purposes of gloating over his colleagues, he instead finds himself writing a deeply personal book about the history of his own life. As the novel progresses we see the lies, half-truths, violent emotions, and relative chaos of Kohler's life laid bare, and while he continues to dig away at the memories of his past he also begins digging a tunnel out from the basement where he works, a reflection of his tunneling through himself. The novel addresses ideas about history, evil, and the living and the dead.

=== Middle C (2013) ===
Middle C is the story of Joseph Skizzen, a middling professor leading a middling life in the middle of Ohio. His father got the family out of Austria before the War by pretending they were Jewish. In London during the war, the father disappeared, presumed to have escaped to Canada or the United States, and the rest of the family makes it to Ohio. As an adult, Skizzen lives with his mother and has a rich fantasy life, centered on his Inhumanity Museum and Arnold Schoenberg.

== Awards and honors ==
Gass received many awards and honors, including grants from the Rockefeller Foundation in 1965, the Solomon R. Guggenheim Foundation in 1970. He won the Pushcart Prize awards in 1976, 1983, 1987, and 1992, and in 1994 he received the Mark Twain Award for Distinguished Contribution to the Literature of the Midwest. In 1959 he was awarded the Longview Foundation Prize for Fiction for his story "The Triumph of Israbestis Tott" (a story later included as the first part of his novel Omensetter's Luck). Chicago Tribune Writers' and Critics' Poll named him one of the ten best American writers and one of the ten best Midwest writers in 1973. He has teaching awards from Purdue University and Washington University; in 1968 the Chicago Tribune Award as One of the Ten Best Teachers in the Big Ten. In 1975 he received the American Academy and Institute of Arts and Letters Award for Fiction. He was a Getty Foundation Fellow in 1991–1992. He received the Lannan Lifetime Achievement Award in 1997; and the American Book Award for The Tunnel in 1996. In 2000 he was honored with the PEN/Nabokov Award and the PEN/Nabokov Lifetime Achievement award which he has called his "most prized prize." Gass has received the National Book Critics Circle Award for Criticism three times, for Habitations of the Word (1985), Finding a Form (1997) and Tests of Time (2003). Gass also received the PEN/Diamonstein-Spielvogel Award for the Art of the Essay for Test of Time in 2003. In 2007 he was the recipient of the St. Louis Literary Award from the Saint Louis University Library Associates

Gass founded the International Writers Center at Washington University in 1990, whose purpose was to "build on the strengths of its resident and visiting faculty writers; to serve as a focal point for writing excellence in all disciplines and in all cultures; to be a directory for writers and writing programs at Washington University, in St. Louis, in the United States, and around the world; and to present the writer to the reader." He made numerous presentations of his photography, and he has a star on the St. Louis Walk of Fame. He also served on the contributing editorial board of the literary journal Conjunctions. In 2006, William H. Gass was a featured speaker at Lake Forest College for the 2006 &NOW Festival and the Lake Forest Literary Festival.

In Dan Simmons's science fiction novel Hyperion, Gass is referred to as "the twentieth century's most honoured writer" by the poet Martin Silenus.

More recently, Gass won the 2007 Truman Capote Award for Literary Criticism in Memory of Newton Arvin. The winner of this award is chosen by a panel of six authors, and s/he also receives a cash prize of $30,000. The panel awarded Gass for his 2006 collection of essays, A Temple of Texts.

== Bibliography ==
=== Fiction ===
- Omensetter's Luck (1966)
- In the Heart of the Heart of the Country (five stories) (1968)
- Willie Masters' Lonesome Wife (illustrated novella) (1968)
- The Tunnel (1995)
- Cartesian Sonata and Other Novellas (four novellas) (1998)
- Middle C (2013)
- Eyes (two novellas, four short stories) (2015)

=== Non-fiction ===
- Fiction and the Figures of Life (1970)
- On Being Blue: A Philosophical Inquiry (1975)
- The World Within the Word (1978)
- Habitations of the Word (1985)
- Finding a Form: Essays (1996)
- Reading Rilke: Reflections on the Problems of Translation (1999)
- Tests of Time (2002)
- Conversations with William H. Gass (2003)
- A Temple of Texts (2006)
- Life Sentences (2012)

=== Omnibus Edition ===
- The William H. Gass Reader (2018)

=== Interviews ===
- Thomas LeClair (Summer 1977). "William Gass, The Art of Fiction No. 65". The Paris Review. Summer 1977 (70).
- Koval, Ramona (July–August 1996). "A conversation with William Gass on 'The Tunnel'". Literature. Quadrant. 40 (7–8): 26–32.
- Richard Abowitz (December 1998). "Still Digging: An interview with writer William Gass". Gadfly.
- Chris Orlet (October 1, 2000). "Interview With William H. Gass". Pif Magazine.
- Micheline Aharonian Marcom (September 22, 2004). "Lannan Readings & Conversations: William Gass". Lannan Foundation.
- "William Gass". The Believer. November 2005.
- "Interview with William H. Gass" (PDF). The Bard Observer. October 12, 2006. Archived from the original (PDF) on March 3, 2016.
- "Len Gutkin interviews William H. Gass". The Los Angeles Review of Books. April 1, 2013.

=== Critical studies and reviews of Gass's work ===
- Crystal Alberts, guest editor. "A Tribute to William H. Gass." North Dakota Quarterly 86, nos. 1/2 (Spring/Summer 2019), 167–226.
- Sally Ball and Heide Ziegler, guest editors. William H. Gass [special issue]. Review of Contemporary Fiction 24, no. 3 (Fall 2004).
- H. L. Hix. Understanding William H. Gass. Univ. of South Carolina Press, 2002
- Watson L. Holloway, William Gass. Twayne, 1990.
- Arthur M. Saltzman. The Fiction of William Gass: The Consolation of Language. Southern Illinois Univ. Press, 1986.
- Stephen Schenkenberg. "Basking in Hell: Returning to William H. Gass's The Tunnel". The Quarterly Conversation. Archived from the original on May 4, 2018.
- John Unsworth (Spring 1992). "William Gass's The Tunnel: The Work in Progress as Post-Modern Genre". Arizona Quarterly. 48 (1).
