= Michael Silverblatt =

American broadcaster and literary critic (1952–2026)

- Born: Michael Philip Silverblatt; August 6, 1952; New York City, U.S.
- Died: February 14, 2026 (aged 73); Los Angeles, California, U.S.
- Occupations: Broadcaster; radio personality

Michael Philip Silverblatt (August 6, 1952 – February 14, 2026) was an American literary critic and broadcaster who hosted Bookworm, a nationally syndicated radio program focusing on books and literature, from 1989 to 2022. He recorded over 1,600 interviews with authors and other literary figures, including Toni Morrison, Salman Rushdie, Joan Didion, Susan Sontag, David Foster Wallace, William H. Gass, W. G. Sebald, and John Ashbery.

Bookworm was broadcast by Los Angeles public radio station KCRW.

== Early life ==
Silverblatt was born into a Jewish family in New York City. He attended SUNY Buffalo, majored in English, and later entered postgraduate studies at Johns Hopkins University before dropping out.

Later, he moved to Los Angeles with the intention of becoming a screenwriter. After a conversation about Russian poetry with KCRW's at a dinner party, he was offered his own radio show.

== KCRW Bookworm ==
On Bookworm, Silverblatt interviewed a variety of writers, including W. G. Sebald, Zadie Smith, Lorrie Moore, Joy Williams, Joshua Cohen, Maggie Nelson, and Richard Powers. He called his interviews "conversations" and did not use prompts or question sheets. Critics and interviewees noted Silverblatt's preparedness; he always read his interviewee's work in advance.

Underwritten by the Lannan Foundation, Bookworm was distributed free of charge to around 50 U.S. radio stations. Silverblatt worked on the show unpaid for its first five years.

== Literary critic ==
Silverblatt coined the term transgressive fiction.

Silverblatt's Los Angeles Times review of William Gass's The Tunnel was blurbed on the cover of its paperback release: "The most beautiful, most complex, most disturbing novel to be published in my lifetime".

He wrote an introduction to a reissue of Kenward Elmslie's The Orchid Stories.

In 2018, Silverblatt was the inaugural recipient of the Deborah Pease Prize, awarded by A Public Space magazine for being a "figure who has advanced the art of literature".

In 2023, The Song Cave published Bookworm: Conversations with Michael Silverblatt, a selection of notable interviews by Silverblatt.

== Death ==
Silverblatt died in Los Angeles on February 14, 2026, at the age of 73.
