= The Millions =

Online literary magazine

- Available in: English
- Owner: PWxyz, LLC
- Creator: C. Max Magee
- Website: www.themillions.com
- Launched: 2003; 23 years ago

The Millions is an online literary magazine created by C. Max Magee in 2003. It contains articles about literary topics and book reviews.

The name was chosen as a play on Magee's name, Maximilian, and because Magee thought the site would be millions of interesting things. In 2011 the blog released between three and four reviews per week. According to the scholar Sebastian Domsch, "The postings reveal the characteristic mixture of a very strong emphasis on personal experiences and viewpoints on the one side and an extensive practice of intertextual opening up by way of hyperlinks on the other." The Sudbury Star's Jessica Watts wrote, "My favourite part of this site is the feature The Future of the Book, which includes a number of articles looking at the rise of the digital age and the increase in use of digital books and media (of particular interest for me, someone working in a library".

The Millions posted an open letter to the Swedish Academy in 2011 asking it to "stop the nonsense and give Philip Roth a Nobel Prize for Literature before he dies."

In 2019 The Millions was acquired by Publishers Weekly.
