= Steven Moore (author) =

American author and literary critic

Steven Moore (born May 15, 1951) is an American author and literary critic. Best known as the primary authority on the novelist William Gaddis, he is the author of the two-volume study The Novel: An Alternative History.

== Biography/Career ==
Born outside of Los Angeles Steven Moore moved to Littleton, Colorado, in 1963, where he attended Arapahoe High School (1966–69), and played bass guitar in Earthquake Moving Company, one of many rock bands he was in, often playing his own compositions.

At the University of Northern Colorado in Greeley, his first literary writings were poems contributed to college literary magazines. In his junior year, he switched majors from history to English, earning both a B.A. (1973) and an M.A. (1974). From 1974 until 1977 he worked as a substitute teacher while writing a novel (Clarinets and Candles, unpublished) and the beginnings of a second. From 1974 to 1978 he was a member of the Colorado Ballet, dancing a variety of minor roles.

He began working at ABC Books in Denver in 1976. Two years later he opened his own independent bookstore, Moore Books, which he operated until selling it in 1981. During this time, he published his first works of literary criticism: a series of short notes on James Joyce's Finnegans Wake in A Wake Newslitter, and book reviews for a Denver arts magazine called Spree. He also wrote his first book, A Readers Guide to William Gaddis's "The Recognitions", published by the University of Nebraska Press in 1982. This was followed by In Recognition of William Gaddis, a collection of essays by various hands, for which he wrote the introduction and contributed an essay. Co-edited with John Kuehl, it was published by Syracuse University Press in 1984. A brief interest in vampire literature led to an anthology Moore edited titled Vampire in Verse, which was published in 1985.

In 1983, Moore returned to college to earn a Ph.D., first at University of Denver, then at Rutgers University in New Jersey, where he graduated in 1988. His dissertation was published the following year as William Gaddis by Twayne Publishers. During these years he continued to write essays for scholarly journals and book reviews for a variety of publications. (See list of publications, below.)

In 1988 Moore joined the staff of Dalkey Archive Press, a press in Illinois that also published Review of Contemporary Fiction, to which he had contributed in the past. In 1996, Dalkey published Moore's Ronald Firbank: An Annotated Bibliography of Secondary Materials. Moore was managing editor of the Review of Contemporary Fiction (1988–1996), during which he contributed many essays and book reviews. Beginning in 1990, Moore started reviewing new fiction for newspapers, principally for The Washington Post, but also for The Nation, Chicago Tribune, and the Los Angeles Times, along with reviews in scholarly journals.

Moore resigned from Dalkey Archive Press in 1996 and continued in the book trade with Borders Books and Music later that year. After working at its first Colorado store for four years, he was promoted to book buyer for the entire chain and moved to Ann Arbor, Michigan in 2001. That same year, his edition of Beerspit Night and Cursing: The Correspondence of Charles Bukowski and Sheri Martinelli was published by (Black Sparrow Press). In addition to his buying duties, Moore was the editor of the Borders Classics line (2003–5). He was laid off in January 2010, though he continues to reside in Ann Arbor. Since then, he has supported himself as a freelance indexer for university presses.

In early 2004, Moore began writing a two-volume survey entitled The Novel: An Alternative History, with special attention to innovative works; the first volume appeared in April 2010 from Continuum Books. Reviewing it in the Washington Post, Alberto Manguel wrote, "Moore tells his story with erudition and wit, and in doing so restores to the reader of good fiction confidence in the craft." In the New York Review of Books, Tim Parks disliked its "gung ho tone" but concluded, "Moore's book has the great merit of listing and summarizing scores upon scores of stories" and that "reading these summaries is a pleasure." The second volume, covering the period 1600–1800, was published by Bloomsbury in August 2013, and won the Christian Gauss Award for literary criticism for that year.

Moore is the leading authority on the novels of William Gaddis, which he discovered in 1975 and about whom he has written several books and essays. He was the guest speaker at two Gaddis symposia (Orléans, France, 2000, and Buffalo, New York, 2005), and assisted with the Chinese translation of Gaddis's J R published in 2008. His edition of The Letters of William Gaddis was published by Dalkey Archive Press in February 2013.

Moore has long championed lengthy, innovative novels: as he told an interviewer, "generally I like 'em big and brainy." Novelist Jonathan Franzen wrote that Moore is a "scholar whose criticism is a model of clarity and intelligent advocacy."

== Publications ==
=== Books ===
- A Reader's Guide to William Gaddis's "The Recognitions." University of Nebraska Press, 1982; rev. 1995. Online HTML. (German translation, Frankfurt: Zweitausendeins, 1998.)
- William Gaddis. Twayne, 1989. Online PDF. Expanded edition: Bloomsbury, 2015.
- Ronald Firbank: An Annotated Bibliography of Secondary Materials, 1905–1995. Dalkey Archive Press, 1996.
- The Novel, An Alternative History: Beginnings to 1600. Continuum, 2010.
- The Novel, An Alternative History: 1600–1800. Bloomsbury, 2013. Winner of the Christian Gauss Award for literary criticism.
- My Back Pages: Reviews and Essays. Zerogram Press, 2017. Corrected, expanded edition, 2018.
- Alexander Theroux: A Fan's Notes. Zerogram Press, 2020.
- Dalkey Days: A Memoir. Zerogram Press, 2023; ebook edition, Redfiend Publishing, 2023.
- Last Time Around: Essays, Reviews, Interviews. Zerogram Press, 2026.

=== Anthologies and editions ===
- In Recognition of William Gaddis. Edited by John R. Kuehl and SM. Syracuse University Press, 1984. ["Introduction," 1–19; " Peer Gynt and The Recognitions ," 81–91, and annotated bibliography, 199–206, by SM]
- The Vampire in Verse. Edited [with an introduction and extensive notes] by SM. Dracula Press, 1985.
- Edward Dahlberg. Samuel Beckett's Wake and Other Uncollected Prose. Edited with an introduction by SM. Dalkey Archive Press, 1989.
- Ronald Firbank. Complete Short Stories. Edited [and with textual notes] by SM. Dalkey Archive Press, 1990. Published in England [with additional material] as The Early Firbank. Quartet, 1991.
- Olive Moore. Collected Writings. Edited [with an appendix] by SM. Dalkey Archive, 1992.
- Ronald Firbank. Complete Plays. Edited with an introduction by SM. Dalkey Archive 1994.
- W. M. Spackman. Complete Fiction. Edited with an afterword by SM. Dalkey Archive, 1997.
- Beerspit Night and Cursing: The Correspondence of Charles Bukowski and Sheri Martinelli. Edited with an introduction by SM. Black Sparrow, 2001.
- Medieval Epics and Sagas. Edited with a preface by SM. Borders Classics, 2005.
- Chandler Brossard, Over the Rainbow? Hardly: Selected Short Seizures. Edited with an introduction by SM. Sun Dog Press, 2005.
- The Letters of William Gaddis. Edited with an introduction and notes by SM. Dalkey Archive, 2013. Revised expanded edition: New York Review Books, 2023.
- On the Decay of Criticism: The Complete Essays of W. M. Spackman. Edited with an introduction by SM. Fantagraphics Books, 2017.
- J. P. McEvoy. The Dixie Dugan Trilogy. Edited with an introduction by SM. Tough Poets Press, 2024.
- W. C. The Adventures of Lady Egeria [1585?]. Edited with an introduction by SM. Sublunary Editions, 2024.

=== Articles, notes, and contributions to books ===
- "David in Crimea ." A Wake Newslitter: Studies of James Joyce's "Finnegans Wake." [AWN] 13 (December 1976): 115–16.
- "For the Record." AWN 13 (December 1976): 118.
- "Oliver Cromwell." AWN 14 (April 1977): 29–30.
- "Luperca Latouche." AWN 17 (April 1980): 25.
- "I Ching." AWN 17 (April 1980): 25.
- "Chronological Difficulties in the Novels of William Gaddis." Critique 22 (September 1980): 79–91.
- "An Interview with William Gaddis." Review of Contemporary Fiction [RCF] 2.2 (Summer 1982): 4–6. (with John Kuehl)
- "William Gaddis: A Selected Bibliography." RCF 2.2 (Summer 1982): 55–56.
- "Pynchon on Record." Pynchon Notes 10 (October 1982): 56–57.
- "Subject Index (1962–1980)." AWN, special supplement (December 1982): I-vi.
- "'Parallel, Not Series': Thomas Pynchon and William Gaddis." Pynchon Notes 11 (February 1983): 6–26.
- "Additional Sources for Gaddis's The Recognitions." American Notes & Queries 22 (March/April 1984): 111–15.
- "'The World Is at Fault.'" Pynchon Notes 15 (Fall 1984): 84–85.
- "Alexander Theroux's Darconville's Cat and the Tradition of Learned Wit." Contemporary Literature 27 (Summer 1986): 233–45.
- "An Interview with Chandler Brossard ." RCF 7.1 (Spring 1987): 38–53.
- "Chandler Brossard: An Introduction and Checklist." RCF 7.1 (Spring 1987): 58–86.
- "William Gaddis: Sidelights Essay." Contemporary Authors, New Revision Series. Edited by Deborah A. Straub. Gale Research Co., 1987. 21:148–53.
- "Gaddis's J R." The Explicator 47.1 (Fall 1988): 55.
- "Introduction." Alan Ansen, Contact Highs: Selected Poems 1957–1987. Dalkey Archive, 1989. xi–xxxiv.
- "Joseph McElroy: A Bibliography." RCF 10.1 (Spring 1990): 283–88.
- "David Markson and the Art of Allusion." RCF 10.2 (Summer 1990): 164–78.
- "William Gaddis: la fascination du labyrinthe." Magazine littéraire, October 1990, 95–97.
- "Alexander Theroux: An Introduction." RCF 11.1 (Spring 1991): 7–28.
- "An Interview with Alexander Theroux." RCF 11.1 (Spring 1991): 29–35.
- "Alexander Theroux: A Bibliography." RCF 11.1 (Spring 1991): 133–39.
- "Afterword." Djuna Barnes, Ladies Almanack. Dalkey Archive, 1992. 87–91.
- "Fin de Siècle." American Notes & Queries 5.4 (October 1992): 223–24. Rpt. in Surfing Tomorrow: Essays on the Future of American Fiction. Ed. Lance Olsen. Prairie Village, KS: Potpourri, 1995. 69–70.
- "Recalled to Life." RCF 13.1 (Spring 1993): 245–47. [on Felipe Alfau]
- "Brigid Brophy: An Introduction and Checklist." RCF 15.3 (Fall 1995): 7–11.
- "Foreword." The Letters of Wanda Tinasky. Edited by T. R. Factor. Vers Libre Press, 1996. ix–xi.
- "A New Language for Desire: Aureole. " RCF 17.3 (Fall 1997): 206–14.
- "Reveries of Desire: An Interview with Rikki Ducornet." Bloomsbury Review, January/February 1998, 11–12. Rpt. in The VP Annual 2016 (Verbivoracious Press, 2016), 81–89.
- "Sheri Martinelli: A Remembrance." Anais 16 (Spring 1998): 92–102.
- "Sheri Martinelli: A Modernist Muse." Gargoyle 41 (Summer 1998): 29–54.
- "Foreword." Chandler Brossard. Who Walk in Darkness. Herodias, 2000.
- "Fairies and Nymphs: The Fiction of Francesca Lia Block." Rain Taxi 5.4 (Winter 2000–01): 32–33.
- "Foreword." Chandler Brossard. The Bold Saboteurs. Herodias, 2001.
- "Nympholepsy." Gargoyle 45 (October 2002): 9–22.
- Untitled contribution to "William Gaddis: A Portfolio." Conjunctions 41 (November 2003): 387.
- "Carpenter's Gothic; or, The Ambiguities." in William Gaddis: Bloom's Modern Critical Views. Ed. Harold Bloom. Philadelphia: Chelsea House, 2004. 101–24.
- "Paper Flowers: Richard Brautigan's Poetry." In Richard Brautigan: Essays on the Writings and Life. Ed. John F. Barber. Jefferson, NC : McFarland & Co., 2006. 188–204. Translated into French as the introduction to Brautigan's Tout ce que j'ai à déclarer: œuvre poétique complète (Le Castor Astral, 2016), 25–51.
- "The Secret History of Agape Agape." In Paper Empire: William Gaddis and the World System. Ed. Joseph Tabbi and Rone Shavers. Tuscaloosa : Univ. of Alabama Press, 2007. 256–66.
- "David Foster Wallace In Memoriam." Modernism/Modernity 16.1 (January 2010): 1–3.
- "William Gaddis: The Nobility of Failure." Critique 51 (February 2010): 118–20.
- "When Knighthood Was in Error." College Hill Review no. 5 (Spring 2010).
- "Foreword." Ted Morrissey. The Beowulf Poet and His Real Monsters. Edwin Mellin Press, 2013. i–iv.
- "The Pleasures of The Sorrows of Young Werther." Apology, #2 (Summer 2013): 112–19.
- "Alexander Theroux—Darconville's Cat." The Syllabus. Ed. G. N. Forester and M. J. Nicholls. Singapore: Verbivoracious Press, 2015, 107–8.
- "Maximalism Down Argentine Way: Adam Buenosayres." Pleasure: A Journal of the Arts no. 4 (October 2015): 15–19.
- "Publishing Rikki." Rikki Ducornet. Ed. G. N. Forester and M. J. Nicholls. Singapore: Verbivoracious Press, 2015, 63–67.
- "The Avant-Pop Novels of J. P. McEvoy." Número Cinq 8.3 (March 2017).
- "What Is (and Isn't) Literature?" 3:AM Magazine, posted 6 January 2020.
- "M. J. Nicholls: Fear Anxiety Panic." Rain Taxi 25.1 (Spring 2020): 16–18.
- "Foreword." Greg Gerke. See What I See: Essays. Zerogram Press, 2021. 9–14.
- Marguerite Young. The Collected Poems. Poetry, 3 October 2022.
- "New Directions for Gaddis Scholarship." Speech delivered 20 October 2022; video: ; text: Electronic Book Review, posted 11 February 2024,
- "William Gaddis and Russian Literature." Firmament 3.2 (May 2023): 7–12.
- "Wild Talents: Pynchon, Gaddis, and Charles Fort." Socrates on the Beach 9, posted 5 September 2023.
- "Rescuing Cynthia Buchanan's Maiden." Socrates on the Beach 11, posted 8 April 2025.
- “Introduction.” J. P. McEvoy, Are You Listening? Arlington, MA: Tough Poets Press, 2025.
- “Disclosing Carol Hart.” Socrates on the Beach 12, posted 24 October 2025.
- “Charles Bukowski’s Ars Poetica: A Previously Unpublished Poem, with Commentary.” Gargoyle Online 13, posted 30 April 2026: https://gargoylemagazine.com/steven-moore/
