= 20th Century's Greatest Hits: 100 English-Language Books of Fiction =

Selected list of books

The 20th Century's Greatest Hits: 100 English-Language Books of Fiction is a list of the 100 best English-language books of the 20th century compiled by American literary critic Larry McCaffery. The list was created largely in response to the Modern Library 100 Best Novels list (1999), which McCaffery considered out of touch with 20th-century fiction. McCaffery wrote that he saw his list "as a means of sharing with readers my own views about what books are going to be read 100 or 1000 years from now".

The list includes many books not included in the Modern Library list, including five of the top ten: Thomas Pynchon's Gravity's Rainbow, Robert Coover's The Public Burning, Samuel Beckett's Trilogy (Molloy, Malone Dies and The Unnamable), Gertrude Stein's The Making of Americans, and William S. Burroughs' The Nova Trilogy. Topping the list is Vladimir Nabokov's 1962 novel Pale Fire, which McCaffery called the "most audaciously conceived novel of the century."

== List ==
Rank	Year	Title	Author
1	1962	Pale Fire	Vladimir Nabokov
2	1922	Ulysses	James Joyce
3	1973	Gravity's Rainbow	Thomas Pynchon
4	1977	The Public Burning	Robert Coover
5	1929	The Sound and the Fury	William Faulkner
6	1955, 1956, 1958	The Trilogy (Molloy, Malone Dies, The Unnamable)	Samuel Beckett
7	1925	The Making of Americans	Gertrude Stein
8	1961, 1962, 1964	The Nova Trilogy (The Soft Machine, The Ticket That Exploded, Nova Express)	William S. Burroughs
9	1955	Lolita	Vladimir Nabokov
10	1939	Finnegans Wake	James Joyce
11	1976	Take It or Leave It	Raymond Federman
12	1987	Beloved	Toni Morrison
13	1994	Going Native	Stephen Wright
14	1947	Under the Volcano	Malcolm Lowry
15	1927	To the Lighthouse	Virginia Woolf
16	1968	In the Heart of the Heart of the Country	William H. Gass
17	1975	J R	William Gaddis
18	1952	Invisible Man	Ralph Ellison
19	1997	Underworld	Don DeLillo
20	1926	The Sun Also Rises	Ernest Hemingway
21	1916	A Portrait of the Artist as a Young Man	James Joyce
22	1925	The Great Gatsby	F. Scott Fitzgerald
23	1903	The Ambassadors	Henry James
24	1920	Women in Love	D. H. Lawrence
25	1981	Sixty Stories	Donald Barthelme
26	1994	The Rifles	William T. Vollmann
27	1955	The Recognitions	William Gaddis
28	1902	Heart of Darkness	Joseph Conrad
29	1961	Catch-22	Joseph Heller
30	1949	Nineteen Eighty-Four	George Orwell
31	1937	Their Eyes Were Watching God	Zora Neale Hurston
32	1936	Absalom, Absalom!	William Faulkner
33	1975	Dhalgren	Samuel R. Delany
34	1939	The Grapes of Wrath	John Steinbeck
35	1984, 1986, 1992, 1993	The Four Elements Tetralogy (The Stain, Entering Fire, The Fountains of Neptune, The Jade Cabinet)	Rikki Ducornet
36	1984, 1986, 1988	Cyberspace Trilogy (Neuromancer, Count Zero, Mona Lisa Overdrive)	William Gibson
37	1934	Tropic of Cancer	Henry Miller
38	1957	On the Road	Jack Kerouac
39	1974	Lookout Cartridge	Joseph McElroy
40	1973	Crash	J. G. Ballard
41	1981	Midnight's Children	Salman Rushdie
42	1960	The Sot-Weed Factor	John Barth
43	1965	Genoa	Paul Metcalf
44	1932	Brave New World	Aldous Huxley
45	1924	A Passage to India	E. M. Forster
46	1972	Double or Nothing	Raymond Federman
47	1939	At Swim-Two-Birds	Flann O'Brien
48	1985	Blood Meridian	Cormac McCarthy
49	1949	The Cannibal	John Hawkes
50	1940	Native Son	Richard Wright
51	1939	The Day of the Locust	Nathanael West
52	1936	Nightwood	Djuna Barnes
53	1980	Housekeeping	Marilynne Robinson
54	1969	Slaughterhouse-Five	Kurt Vonnegut
55	1988	Libra	Don DeLillo
56	1952	Wise Blood	Flannery O'Connor
57	1985	Always Coming Home	Ursula K. Le Guin
58	1930, 1932, 1936	U.S.A. Trilogy (The 42nd Parallel, 1919, The Big Money)	John Dos Passos
59	1962	The Golden Notebook	Doris Lessing
60	1951	The Catcher in the Rye	J. D. Salinger
61	1929	Red Harvest	Dashiell Hammett
62	1981	What We Talk About When We Talk About Love	Raymond Carver
63	1914	Dubliners	James Joyce
64	1923	Cane	Jean Toomer
65	1905	The House of Mirth	Edith Wharton
66	1980	Riddley Walker	Russell Hoban
67	1956, 1958, 1963	The Checkerboard Trilogy (Go in Beauty, The Bronc People, Portrait of the Artist with 26 Horses)	William Eastlake
68	1976	The Franchiser	Stanley Elkin
69	1985, 1986, 1986	The New York Trilogy (City of Glass, Ghosts, The Locked Room)	Paul Auster
70	1990	Skinny Legs and All	Tom Robbins
71	1996	Infinite Jest	David Foster Wallace
72	1995	The Age of Wire and String	Ben Marcus
73	1966	Tlooth	Harry Mathews
74	1969	Pricksongs and Descants	Robert Coover
75	1962	The Man in the High Castle	Philip K. Dick
76	1991	American Psycho	Brett Easton Ellis
77	1969	The French Lieutenant's Woman	John Fowles
78	1980, 1981, 1982, 1983	The Book of the New Sun Tetralogy (The Shadow of the Torturer, The Claw of the Conciliator, The Sword of the Lictor, The Citadel of the Autarch)	Gene Wolfe
79	1962	A Clockwork Orange	Anthony Burgess
80	1975, 1978, 1983	Albany Cycle (Legs, Billy Phelan's Greatest Game, Ironweed)	William Kennedy
81	1995	The Tunnel	William H. Gass
82	1966	Omensetter's Luck	William H. Gass
83	1949	The Sheltering Sky	Paul Bowles
84	1981	Darconville's Cat	Alexander Theroux
85	1968	Up	Ronald Sukenick
86	1969	Yellow Back Radio Broke-Down	Ishmael Reed
87	1919	Winesburg, Ohio	Sherwood Anderson
88	1987	You Bright and Risen Angels	William T. Vollmann
89	1948	The Naked and the Dead	Norman Mailer
90	1968	The Universal Baseball Association, Inc., J. Henry Waugh, Prop.	Robert Coover
91	1970	Creamy and Delicious	Steve Katz
92	1980	Waiting for the Barbarians	J. M. Coetzee
93	1953	More Than Human	Theodore Sturgeon
94	1979	Mulligan Stew	Gilbert Sorrentino
95	1929	Look Homeward, Angel	Thomas Wolfe
96	1925	An American Tragedy	Theodore Dreiser
97	1981	Easy Travel to Other Planets	Ted Mooney
98	1989	Tours of the Black Clock	Steve Erickson
99	1990	In Memoriam to Identity	Kathy Acker
100	1995	Hogg	Samuel R. Delany

== Statistics ==
Not counting the tetralogies of Rikki Ducornet (#35) and Gene Wolfe (#78), the most cited author is James Joyce, who has written four works on the list: Ulysses (#2), Finnegans Wake (#10), A Portrait of the Artist as a Young Man (#21), and Dubliners (#63). Robert Coover and William H. Gass each have three works on the list, while Samuel Delany, Don DeLillo, William Faulkner, Raymond Federman, William Gaddis, Vladimir Nabokov, and William Vollmann have two apiece.

== Titles in common with Modern Library 100 Best Novels ==
Altogether, there are 34 titles in common between the Modern Library list and the Greatest Hits list:

- The Ambassadors
- An American Tragedy
- Brave New World
- Catch-22
- The Catcher in the Rye
- A Clockwork Orange
- The Day of the Locust
- Finnegans Wake
- The Grapes of Wrath
- The Great Gatsby
- Heart of Darkness
- The House of Mirth
- Invisible Man
- Ironweed (Note: The entire Albany Cycle was included on the list, where Ironweed was listed as a solo work on the Modern Library list.)
- Lolita
- Midnight's Children
- The Naked and the Dead
- Native Son
- Nineteen Eighty-Four
- On the Road
- Pale Fire
- A Passage to India
- A Portrait of the Artist as a Young Man
- The Sheltering Sky
- Slaughterhouse-Five
- The Sound and the Fury
- The Sun Also Rises
- To the Lighthouse
- Tropic of Cancer
- Ulysses
- Under the Volcano
- The USA Trilogy
- Winesburg, Ohio
- Women in Love

== See also ==
- Modern Library 100 Best Novels
- Marcel Reich-Ranicki's anthology of exemplary German literature Der Kanon
