= Grand View (play) =

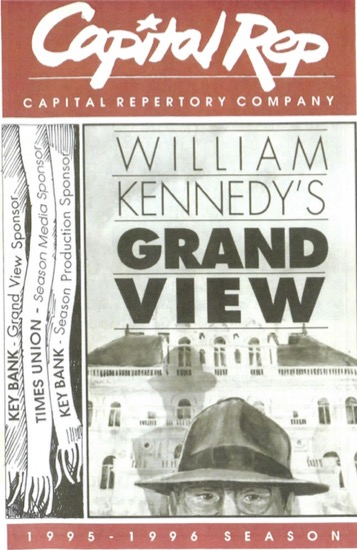
Playbill cover

Grand View is the first produced play by Pulitzer Prize-winning author William Kennedy. Its world premiere was at Capital Repertory Theatre in Albany, NY, starring prolific television actor Robert Hogan.

== Development ==
William Kennedy first attempted to write a play in 1957, inspired by television plays of that era. He continued to be interested in writing for theatre, though daunted by the idea of writing in collaboration with others, in contrast to the solo work of writing a novel.

The collaboration between Kennedy and Capital Repertory Theatre emerged in 1993, under the auspices of then-artistic director Bruce Bouchard, who had initially encouraged him to adapt one of his novels. Bouchard introduced Kennedy to playwright Romulus Linney, then in residence at Yaddo in Saratoga Springs, NY. In 1994, Kennedy began co-writing the play with Linney. Work on the play coincided with the start of writing his novel Roscoe.

After some work on the play was done, Linney and Kennedy ended their partnership citing "artistic differences" and Kennedy proceeded to write the play alone. A public staged reading was produced in August 1994, followed by a second reading in January 1995 and a third in January 1996, helping Kennedy to further craft his rewrites.

Real life people and places inspired him, including his childhood summers at the Grand View Lake House in the Adirondacks. The location first appears in Kennedy's 1992 novel Very Old Bones. The character of Patsy McCall, who appeared in the novels Ironweed and was mentioned in Billy Phelan's Greatest Game, resembles real-life Daniel P. O'Connell in conflict with Thomas E. Dewey, according to Kennedy. But the characters and circumstances were not meant to be drawn from real life.

The project received funding from the Pew Charitable Trust/Theatre Communications Group National Theatre Artists Residency Program.

Kennedy revised the play many times, and was intensely involved in the rehearsal process, attending 12 hour rehearsals and aggressively re-writing lines and scenes in response to director Maggie Mancinelli-Cahill and feedback from the cast.

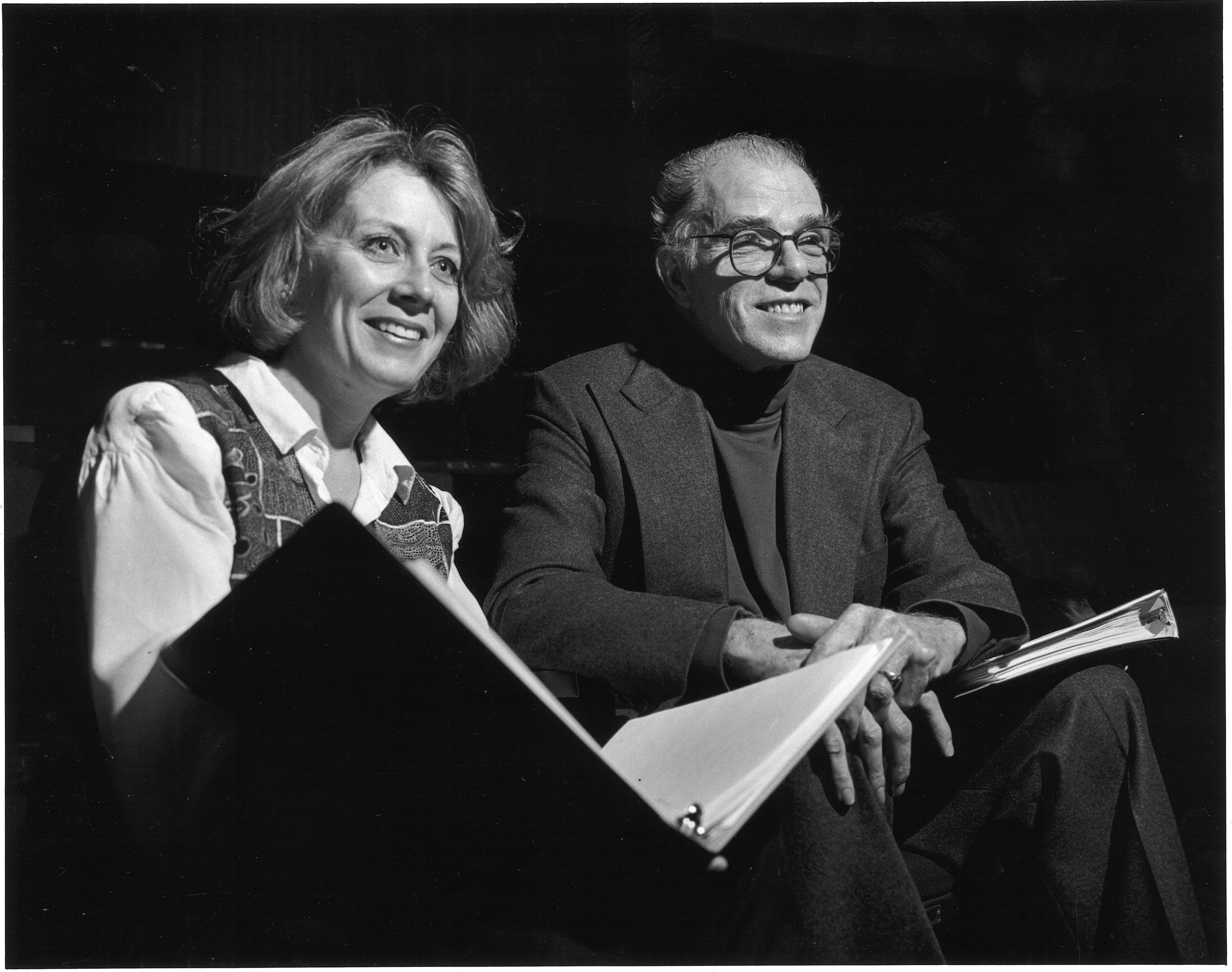
William Kennedy and director Maggie Mancinelli-Cahill at production reading

== Plot ==
On Labor Day, 1944, political boss Patsy McCall vacations at the Grand View Hotel on Saratoga Lake with his entourage. The tranquility is shattered by the arrival of political rival and former friend, Corbet Atterby.

== Production credits ==
=== Cast ===
- Patsy McCall - Robert Hogan
- Corbett Atterby - Stephen Bradbury
- Richard Maloney - Charles Stransky
- Mabel Atterby - Louisa Flaningham
- Faye Atterby - Connan Morrisey
- Jimmy Gill - George Rafferty
- Alice Shugrue - Nicola Sheara

=== Crew ===
- Director - Maggie Mancinelli-Cahill
- Costume Designer - Thom Heyer
- Set Designer - Jeff Cowie
- Lighting Designer - Robert Lott
- Sound Designer - Donna Riley
- Production Stage Manager - Carol Dawes
- Casting Director - Stephanie Klapper
- General Manager/Artistic Associate - Mark Dalton
- Director of Development - P. Leigh Armor

== Critical reception ==
The world premiere was attended by John F. Kennedy Jr. who stated "This is part of my continuing education of Albany. Bill's a good friend and I was interested in this play because of him. If he wrote it, it should be good."

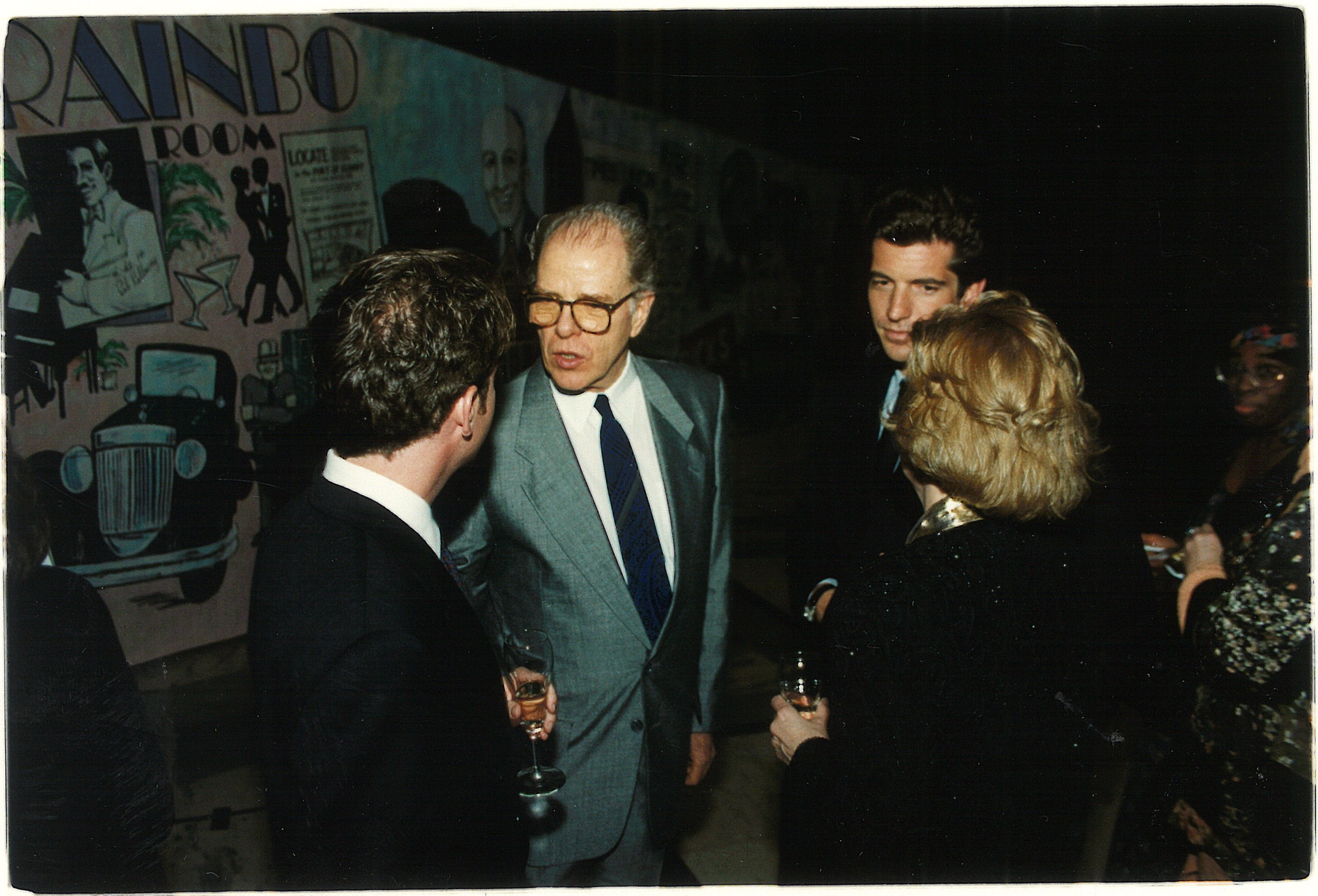
William Kennedy and John F. Kennedy Jr. at opening night

Critics proved generally favorable. "With his first play, Kennedy has captured what makes his books page-turners. Go around this corner, there's another surprise, go around that corner, there's a good one-liner, around another, there's a secret waiting to be unearthed," said critic Michelle F. Solomon. The Daily Gazette lauded Kennedy's "stiletto-edged humor" and "clear insight into the minds and machinations of the politically involved," concluding it was "cracking good theater."

Literary scholar Michael Patrick Gillespie notes that, like his novels, the play takes place over a short period of time. Unlike his other novels, however, Gillespie notes that the play explores the role of politics on individuals in a more detailed way, including how people survive divorced from ethical codes and communal ties

== Production history ==
Public readings were conducted in 1994, 1995 and 1996. The premiere production ran from May 8, 1996, to June 2.

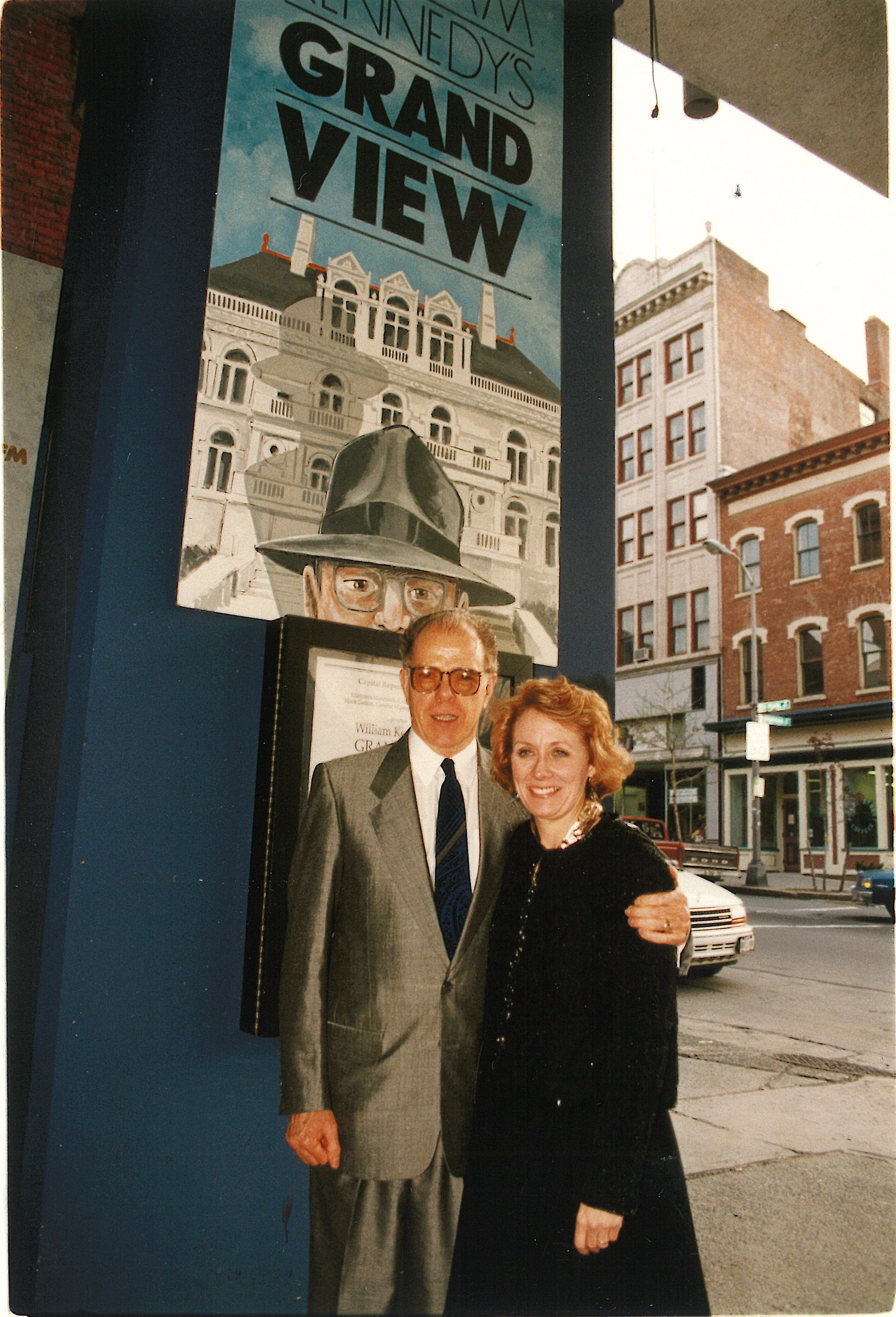
William Kennedy and director Maggie Mancinelli-Cahill outside theatre

Grand View was revived in 2000 by the Pegasus Players in Chicago. Under the direction of Terry McCabe, its cast include Joel Daly, Lawrence Garner, Doug Frank, and Donna Smothers McGough.

In May 2007, Capital Repertory produced a staged reading of the play, a culmination of a six-week citywide celebration of the author's works. It starred Brian Dennehy.
