= Modern Library's 100 Best Novels =

1998 list of best English-language novels

Modern Library 100 Best Novels
- Description: 100 best English-language novels of the 20th century
- Country: United States
- Presented by: Modern Library (Random House)
- Website: sites.prh.com/modern-library-top-100

Modern Library's 100 Best Novels is a 1998 list of the best English-language novels published during the 20th century, (Note: Arthur Koestler's Darkness at Noon was originally written in German, but since the original German text was lost at the time this list was published, and German versions, published with the title Sonnenfinsternis (literally "solar eclipse") were back-translations from English, it was reasonable to consider the English version the canonical contemporary text. The German manuscript was found in 2015, published in German in 2018, and published in English translation in 2019.) as selected by the American publishing imprint, Modern Library, from among 400 novels published by Random House, which owns Modern Library. The purpose of the list was to "bring the Modern Library to public attention" and stimulate sales of its books. A separate Modern Library 100 Best Nonfiction list of the 100 best non-fiction books of the 20th century was created the same year.

== Editors' list ==
During early 1998, the Modern Library polled its editorial board to find their opinions of the best 100 novels. The board of review consisted of Daniel J. Boorstin, A. S. Byatt, Christopher Cerf, Shelby Foote, Vartan Gregorian, Edmund Morris, John Richardson, Arthur Schlesinger Jr., William Styron and Gore Vidal. All but Gregorian were published by Random House or an affiliate.

Ulysses by James Joyce topped the list, followed by F. Scott Fitzgerald's The Great Gatsby and Joyce's A Portrait of the Artist as a Young Man. The most recent novel in the list is William Kennedy's Ironweed, published in 1983; the oldest is The Way of All Flesh by Samuel Butler, which was written between 1873 and 1884, but not published until 1902. Joseph Conrad's Heart of Darkness was technically first published as a three-part serial in 1899; however, it was not published as a novel in a single volume until 1902, making it eligible for the list. Conrad has four novels on the list, the most of any author. William Faulkner, E. M. Forster, Henry James, James Joyce, D. H. Lawrence, and Evelyn Waugh each have three novels. There are ten other authors with two novels.

The following table shows the top ten novels from the editors' list:

#	Year	Title	Author
1	1922	Ulysses	James Joyce
2	1925	The Great Gatsby	F. Scott Fitzgerald
3	1916	A Portrait of the Artist as a Young Man	James Joyce
4	1955	Lolita	Vladimir Nabokov
5	1932	Brave New World	Aldous Huxley
6	1929	The Sound and the Fury	William Faulkner
7	1961	Catch-22	Joseph Heller
8	1940	Darkness at Noon	Arthur Koestler
9	1913	Sons and Lovers	D. H. Lawrence
10	1939	The Grapes of Wrath	John Steinbeck

== See also ==
- 20th Century's Greatest Hits: 100 English-Language Books of Fiction
- Bokklubben World Library
- Le Monde's 100 Books of the Century
- Marcel Reich-Ranicki's anthology of exemplary German literature Der Kanon
- Western canon
- Great books
