= Francis Phelan (fictional character) =

Appears in William J. Kennedy's Albany novels

Francis Phelan is a fictional character in many of William J. Kennedy’s Albany novels, though he is featured most prominently in Ironweed. He is a former professional baseball player who left Albany in shame after dropping his infant son Gerald.

== Fictional biography ==
Francis Aloysius Phelan was born in 1880 to Michael and Kathryn (McIlhenny) Phelan, a railroad worker with the New York Central, and his wife. Michael and Kathryn had more children, but only "Chick" is mentioned by name in Ironweed. In Very Old Bones his siblings are named Sarah, Charles "Chick", Peter (co-protagonist of the book), Mary "Molly", Julia, and Thomas "Tommy". Michael died in 1895 when he was hit by a train while Francis was delivering his lunch, a death that haunted Francis for years and which allowed Kathryn to rule her household unopposed.

In 1897 Kathryn had a feud with neighbor Katrina Daugherty (wife of writer Edward and mother of Martin) over a tree growing at the fence separating their yards. Katrina hired Francis to help trim the tree, and they grow close after she seduces him by walking into the yard naked one day. They carry an on-and-off affair until she is killed in 1912 in a fire that started in a neighboring school.

Francis later married Annie Farrell, daughter of "Iron" Joe Farrell, who gave him three children, Billy (later seen in Billy Phelan's Greatest Game), Margaret "Peg" (who marries George Quinn and has Daniel "Danny" Quinn by him; Danny is the main character is Changó's Beads and Two-Tone Shoes, with George a supporting character) and Gerald, whom Francis accidentally drops headfirst as a baby and causes him to leave for the baseball circuit in shame.

Francis got involved with another drifter named Helen Archer, whose dream of playing piano professionally through training at Vassar College had been dashed by her father's suicide and her mother's subsequent favoritism of her brother Patrick, who became a crooked lawyer involved in Albany politics.

In 1938 he and Helen return to Albany. Francis finds a temporary job as a gravedigger and as a junk hauler under old Rosskam and his cart.

The issue of Francis' death is left ambiguous at the conclusion of Ironweed. In Very Old Bones, Billy, discussing him with Peter and the rest of the family in 1958, mentions that Francis, after another absence, came back for good in 1942 and reconciled with Annie, and died later in the year, at age 62, during a baseball game he had been filling in as a result of regular able-bodied players being drafted for World War II.

== In other media ==
In the film adaptation of the book, Phelan is portrayed by Jack Nicholson.
