= Marion Roberts =

American dancer, girlfriend of Legs Diamond

Marion "Kiki" Roberts (née Strasmick) (born 1909 in Boston, Massachusetts to Martha Strasmick) was an American dancer and showgirl. She was better known as the girlfriend and moll of American gangster Legs Diamond.

== Early life ==
Roberts dreamed of being a celebrity from a very young age and she placed eighth in a children's beauty pageant. She won a contract to participate at the Ziegfeld Follies as a "Ziegfeld girl", but as she was too young to sign that contract, she could not participate at that time.

At age 16, however, searching for bigger fame, Roberts and her mother Martha moved to New York City. In 1930 they were living in Manhattan. She began working for Texas Guinan at Guinan's nightclub the Moritz. At age 17, she was signed as a Ziegfeld girl.

=== Legs Diamond ===
Jack "Legs" Diamond was a major Irish-American bootlegger and mobster of the 1920s and 1930s. There are various accounts as to how Diamond and "Kiki" Roberts met, but one was that she had befriended a lady named Agnes O. Laughlin, who was in turn friends with Diamond and introduced them.

The two soon became lovers, gaining Roberts the celebrity she wanted. Diamond helped Roberts get introduced to New York City choreographers in order to improve her dancing skills.

It is widely believed that Roberts was one of the last people to see Diamond alive before he was gunned down in December 1931. "Kiki" Roberts and Diamond's wife Alice were both questioned in connection with the murder's investigation, but they were not suspected of wrongdoing.

== Later life ==
Roberts did an interview for the Boston American newspaper, recorded in film in 1931, where she expressed a desire to return to the stage. In 1935, Roberts made front page news when she was rescued from drowning by comedian Jackie Gleason at Budd Lake, New Jersey. Gleason had been playing at The Oasis nightclub in Budd Lake. When photos of him and Roberts were featured in New York tabloids, Gleason remarked that Roberts "couldn't have drowned with those boobs." By 1937, she was headlining a show titled Crazy Quilt at the Allentown Lyric Theater in Allentown, Pennsylvania.

By the 1940s, she had disappeared from the limelight. Attempts at finding her whereabouts and her death date have been unsuccessful. Marion lived in Menands, New York.

== In pop culture ==
"Kiki" Roberts features prominently in writer William Kennedy's novel about Legs Diamond, titled Legs.

She is played by actress Amanda Greer in the 2019 biopic The Last Day of Legs Diamond.
