= Staining (disambiguation) =

Staining is a local discoloration.

Staining may refer to one of the following.

- Staining, dyeing of organic matter in the laboratory
- Wood staining, a wood treatment
- Staining, Lancashire, a village in Lancashire
- All Hallows Staining a former church in the City of London

== See also ==
- Stain (disambiguation)
