= Gun moll =

Female companion of a male criminal

A gun moll /mɒl/ is early 1900s slang for the female companion, girlfriend or mistress of a male professional criminal or mob leader. Some gun molls were themselves gangsters and they were accomplices in criminal activities.

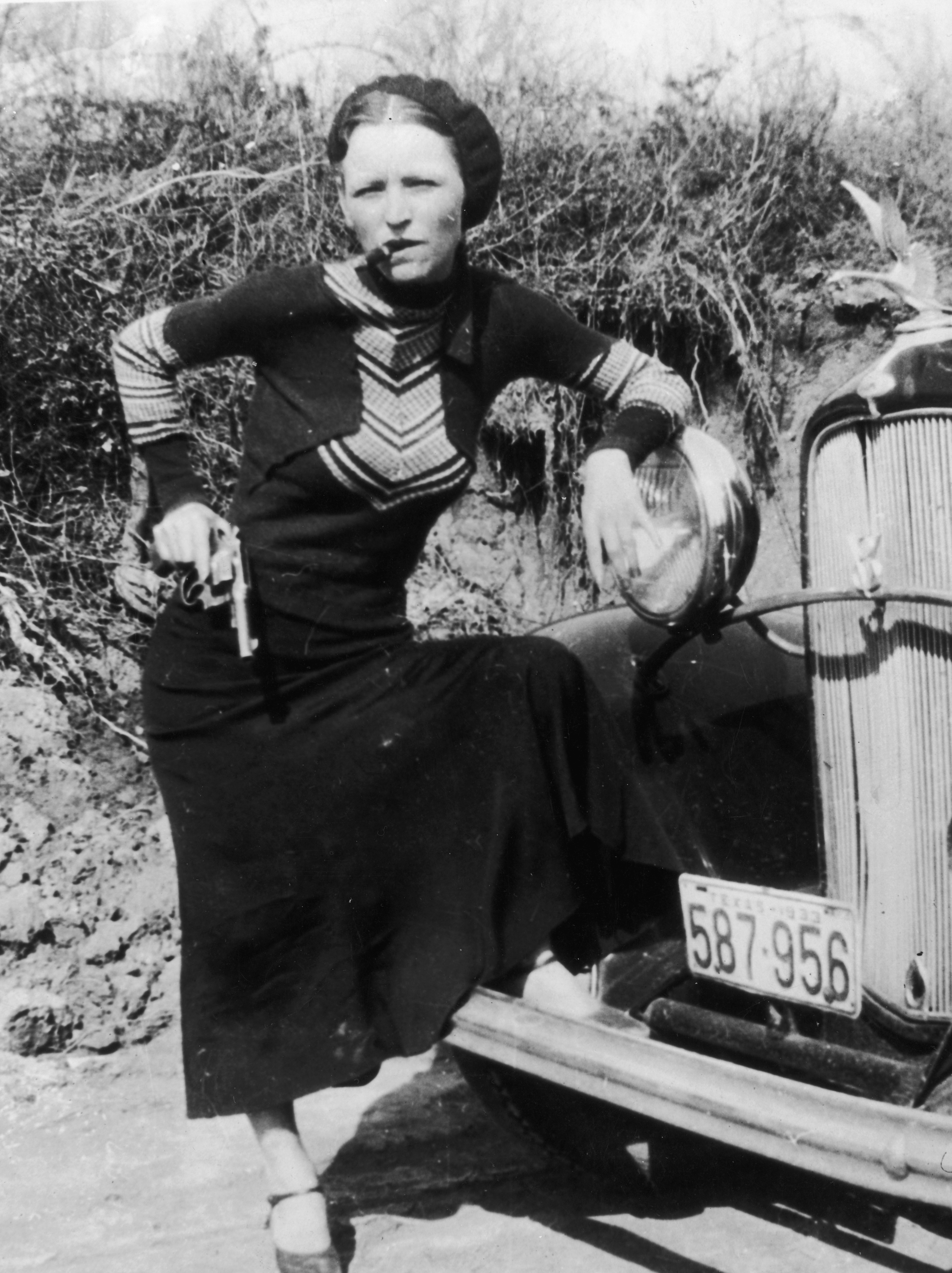
Bonnie Parker's pose with a cigar and a revolver cultivated her portrayal in the press as a 'cigar-smoking gun moll'.

== Terminology ==
They may also be called a gangster moll, gangster's moll or mob moll.

"Gun" was British slang for thief, derived from Yiddish ganef (גנבֿ). "Moll" is also used as a euphemism for a woman prostitute or it may be "from [a] nickname of Mary", as in Molly.

== Historical examples ==
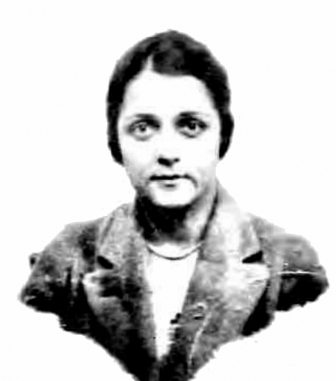
Helen Julia Godman – Passport photo taken in 1919

Notable gun molls (and the men they were associated with) include:

- Beulah Baird – Charles "Pretty Boy" Floyd
- Jean Delaney (Crompton) – Tommy Carroll
- Phoolan Devi – Indian dacoit, gun moll of Vikram Mallah, later turned into the gang leader after his death
- Victoria DiGiorgio Gotti – John Gotti
- Judith Exner – an American woman who claimed to be the mistress of U.S. president John F. Kennedy and of Mafia leaders Sam Giancana and John Roselli
- Evelyn "Billie" Frechette – John Dillinger
- Buda Godman (née Helen Julia Godman; 1888–1945) – John Homer T. ("Dapper Jackie") French, member of the Lou Blonger Gang of Denver. A photo of Buda holding a gun is found in Philip S. Van Cise's Fighting the Underworld.
- Catherine Greig – James Whitey Bulger
- Maria Victoria Henao – Pablo Escobar
- Karen Hill – Henry Hill
- Virginia Hill – Bugsy Siegel
- Mary Kinder (née Mary Northern; 1909–1981) – Harry Pierpont
- Opal "Mack Truck" Long – Russell Clark
- Edna Murray – wife of "Diamond Joe" Sullivan, who was executed for murder in 1924. She then married Jack Murray, who was imprisoned for 25 years in 1925. She then lived with Volney Davis, until they were both arrested for kidnapping in 1935.
- Mary O'Dare – Raymond Hamilton
- Bonnie Parker – Clyde Barrow
- Geraldine "Geri" McGee Rosenthal – Frank Rosenthal
- Kathryn Thorne (née Cleo May Brooks; 1904–1985) – George "Machine Gun" Kelly
- Helen Gillis (née Wawzynak; 1908–1987) – George "Baby Face" Nelson
- Kiki Roberts - Legs Diamond

== In fiction ==
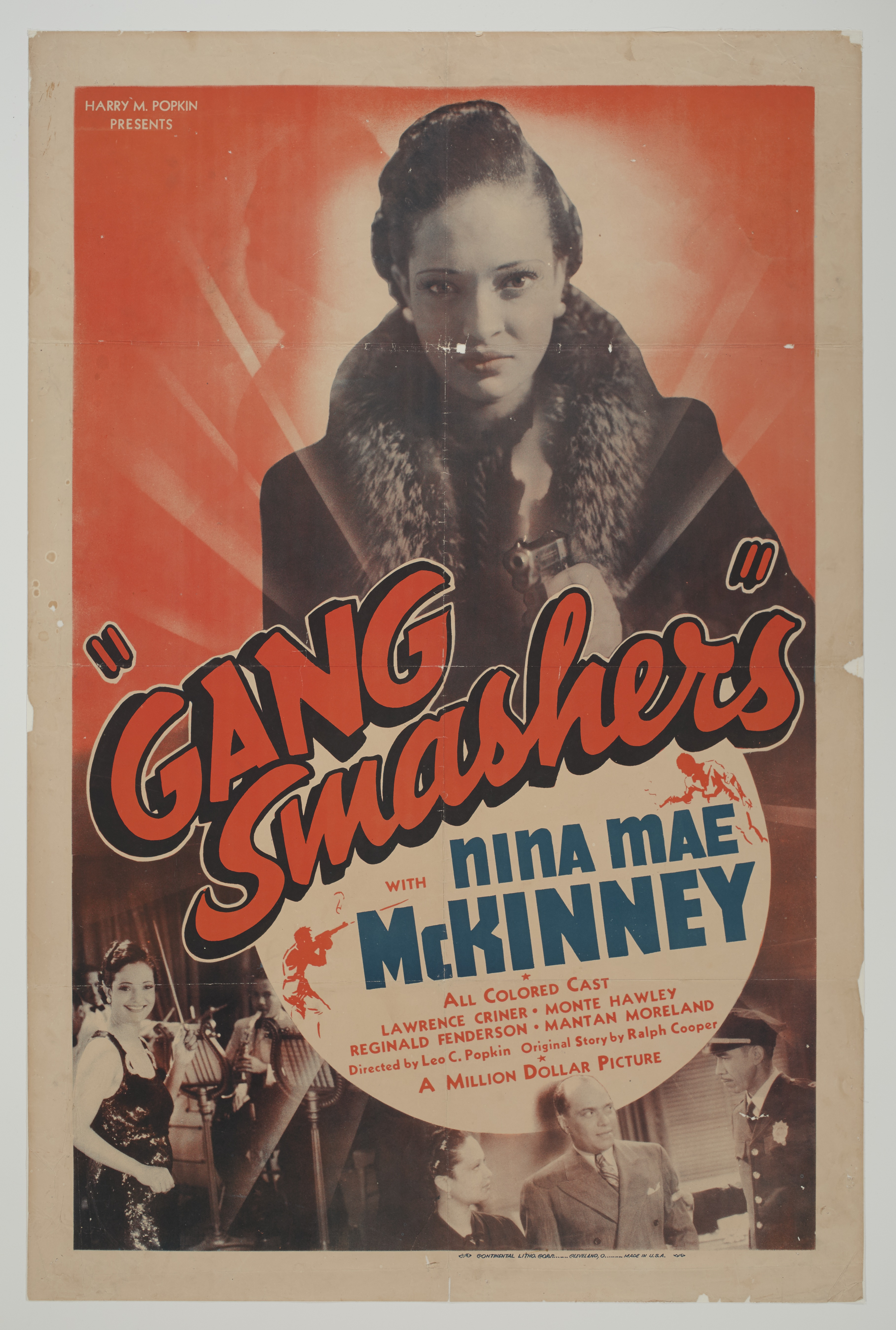
The 1938 film Gang Smashers, also known as Gun Moll, is about racketeering in Harlem.

In film noir movies about crime, the gangster's moll is usually an attractive, blonde — often a variant of the bimbo stereotype — who may be a former showgirl. The gangster often uses the moll as a "trophy" to boost his status.

Examples include:

- The gangster's girlfriend in the 1931 film The Public Enemy
- the moll in the 1967 film The St Valentine's Day Massacre
- Hilda, the gun moll played by Joan Bennett in the 1939 film The Housekeeper's Daughter

== See also ==
- Femme fatale
- Groupie
- Moll (Australian slang)
- Nightclub singer
- Pachucas
- Ride-or-die chick
