= Ted Mooney =

American novelist (1951–2022)

- Born: October 19, 1951; Dallas, Texas, U.S.
- Died: March 25, 2022 (aged 70); New York City, U.S.
- Education: Bennington College
- Occupation: Author
- Years active: 1977–2022
- Known for: Easy Travel to Other Planets

Edward Comstock Mooney (October 19, 1951 – March 25, 2022) was an American novelist and short story writer. He published four novels: Easy Travel to Other Planets (1981), Traffic and Laughter (1990), Singing into the Piano (1998), and The Same River Twice (2010). Mooney also served as the senior editor of Art in America from 1977 to 2008 and taught at the Yale University Graduate School of Art.

== Early life and education ==
Mooney was born on October 19, 1951, in Dallas, Texas. He enrolled at Columbia University with the class of 1973 before transferring to Bennington College, where he completed his bachelor's degree; he then returned to Manhattan.

== Career ==
He worked for three years writing his first and most successful novel, Easy Travel to Other Planets, which was awarded the Sue Kaufman Prize for First Fiction by the American Academy and Institute of Arts and Letters, and was also a finalist for best first novel in the 1982 American Book Awards. The novel was mentioned in Larry McCaffery's list of the 100 greatest books of the 20th century, where it was described as:

a haunting, lyrical novel [which] perfectly exemplifies the blend of the postmodern mainstream and SF to be found in the other two novels (i.e., DeLillo's White Noise and Gibson's Neuromancer) which best captured the vast, media-driven transformations at work in American life during the 80s.

The novel also introduced the term "information sickness", which has since been used in various contexts as a symptom or result of overexposure to media. In a 1991 article for Associated Press, Hillel Italie wrote:

Mooney's work reflects a struggle with information and disinformation, the fight to balance stories about real people against images transmitted through the media. There's an other-wordly quality to his books, a sense of life as if it took place on the moon, where people are merely bodies drifting in space, struggling to communicate.

== Books ==
Easy Travel to Other Planets, with its startling and now-famous opening scene describing a woman having sex with a dolphin, received glowing reviews. The Fort Worth Star-Telegram titled its review "A dazzling debut, a bold novel to reckon with." Writing in The Los Angeles Times, Carolyn See called Easy Travel "an absolutely remarkable book . . . absolutely original; it takes materials we have with us every day and puts them together to make a totally strange but utterly recognizable world." In his review in The Cincinnati Enquirer, Jon Saari wrote:

Mooney's novel has both an immediacy and a distance that stuns the reader in the power of its lyric realism . . . the sleeper of the publishing season, a novel that is without compromise in its portrayal of complicated themes and characters.

Traffic and Laughter, Mooney's second book, set in Los Angeles in the 1990s, received mostly good reviews. Writing in The Palm Beach Post, Peter Smith praised the novel, calling Mooney a lyrical writer, though one tempered by detachment:

That detachment is a major part of what gives Traffic and Laughter its strength; Mooney is a calm observer of his characters, examining their cultures with an anthropologist's eye. Even his most familiar scenes have a hallucinogenic edge of lucidity . . . With his first novel, Mooney's promise was unquestionable. With Traffic and Laughter, it is well on the way to fulfillment.

Mooney's Singing into the Piano, published in 1998, has another startling opening, with an American couple's shocking erotic behavior during a fundraiser for a Mexican presidential candidate. In the New York Times Book Review, Sarah Kerr wrote:

Singing Into the Piano often feels like a few novels fused into one. Sometimes it's a dry allegory, or a diverting game. Sometimes it's an earnest attack on selfishness. Luckily, it's an expert entertainment throughout, which once in a while glows with a rare tenderness.

The Same River Twice, published in 2010, again featured an international cast of characters involved in mysterious intrigues. In his review in The Boston Globe, Carlo Wolff called the book:

a philosophical entertainment doubling as a riveting, unconventional thriller . . . Ted Mooney’s fourth novel explores issues of mutability against fixity, evolution against stasis, art against artifice, and the vexing allure of an affair against the security of marriage.

== Awards and honors ==
Mooney received a Guggenheim Fellowship in 1983 and was the recipient of two Ingram Merrill Foundation grants.

== Personal life ==
Mooney died from heart disease at his home in Manhattan on March 22, 2022, at the age of 70.
