= Stain (disambiguation) =

A stain is an unwanted localized discoloration, often in fabrics or textiles.

Stain(s) or The Stain(s) may also refer to:

== Color ==
- Stain (heraldry), a non-standard tincture
- Staining, in biology, a technique used to highlight contrast in samples
- Wood stain, a type of paint used to color wood

== Arts and entertainment ==
=== Music ===
- Stains (Los Angeles band), a hardcore punk band formed in 1976
- The Stains (Maine), an early-1980s punk band
- MDC (band), originally The Stains, an Austin, Texas, punk band formed in 1979
- Stain (album), by Living Colour, 1993
- Stain (EP), by Mystery Machine, 1992
- "Stain", a song by Nirvana from Blew, 1989
- "Stains", a song by Future from the Superfly film soundtrack, 2018
- "Stained", a song by Linkin Park from From Zero, 2024
- "Stained", a song by Moka Only from Lowdown Suite 2… The Box, 2009

=== Other media ===
- Stain (film), a 2021 Ugandan drama film
- The Stain (film), a 1914 American silent drama film
- The Stain (novel), a 1984 novel by Rikki Ducornet
- Stain (My Hero Academia), a character in the manga series My Hero Academia
- S.T.A.I.N, a fictional crime organization in the video game Mystery Case Files: Huntsville
- The Stains, a fictional band in the 1981 film Ladies and Gentlemen, The Fabulous Stains

== Places ==
- Stains, Seine-Saint-Denis, a commune in the northern suburbs of Paris, France

== See also ==
- Bloodstain (disambiguation)
- Staines-upon-Thames, a town in Surrey, England
- Staind, an American rock band
