= Meditations in Green =

1983 novel by Stephen Wright

- First edition
- Author: Stephen Wright
- Genre: Fiction
- Set in: Vietnam
- Published: C. Scribner's Sons
- Publication date: 1983
- Pages: 342 pages
- ISBN: 0684180103
- OCLC: 9682276

Meditations in Green is the first novel written by Stephen Wright. First published in 1983, it is an account of Spec. 4 James Griffin's tour in Vietnam.

The novel is based in part on Wright's own experience in Vietnam, though he has said, "if I had just written an autobiographical novel, I wouldn’t have been satisfied with that. I knew I had my hands on incredible material and I wanted to do it the way I felt would be right, to construct a pleasing whole out of a handful of jagged pieces."
