= M31: A Family Romance =

1988 novel by Stephen Wright

- First edition, cover art by Peter Schroth
- Author: Stephen Wright
- Language: English
- Publisher: Harmony Books
- Publication date: 1988
- ISBN: 0-517-56869-1 (first edition)
- Dewey Decimal: 813.54
- LC Class: PS3573.R5433 M18

M31: A Family Romance is the second novel written by Stephen Wright. First published in 1988 by Harmony Books, it is a dark satire about media and mass culture as filtered through the lens of a fictional family with extraterrestrial ties.

The Los Angeles Times reviewed M31 as “a novel of original and wide ambitions, largely achieved.” Laura Miller proposed in 2004 that the “undersung” M31 is a candidate for the Great American Novel.
