= Mount Olivet Cemetery (Queens) =

Cemetery in Queens, New York

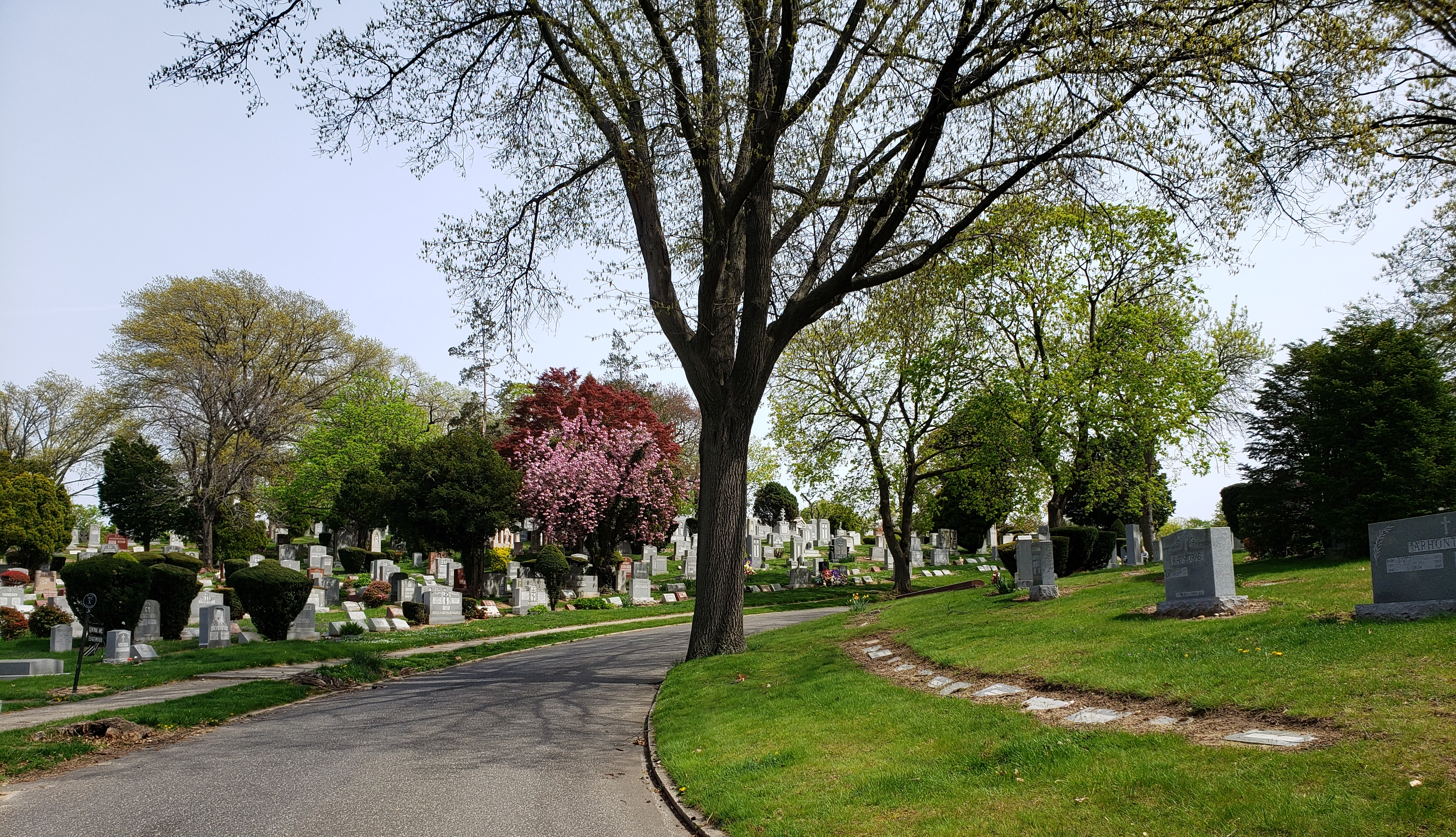
- Interactive map of Mount Olivet Cemetery

Details
- Established: 1850
- Location: Maspeth, Queens, New York
- Country: United States
- Coordinates: 40°43′14″N 73°53′46″W
- Type: Non-sectarian
- Website: Mount Olivet Cemetery

Mount Olivet Cemetery is located in the Maspeth neighborhood of Queens in New York City. Named for Jerusalem's Mount of Olives, it was incorporated in 1850 under the Rural Cemetery Act of 1847. Originally established as an Episcopal cemetery, that restriction was lifted in 1851.

The land that comprises the cemetery was acquired from George Fash and the estate of James Waterbury. It was later purchased in 1878, which brought it to today's total of 71 acres. It was a popular weekend destination in the 19th century and is known for its views of Manhattan.

On the cemetery grounds is the Robert J. Marks Post #560 Grand Army of the Republic Lot, on which is located a Civil War memorial dedicated "to the Defenders of the Union". 25 Civil War veterans and seventeen wives are buried in the lot. In addition to one of the founders, former U.S. Congressman James Maurice, the cemetery is also home to Georges V. Matchabelli, Helena Rubinstein, and Legs Diamond.

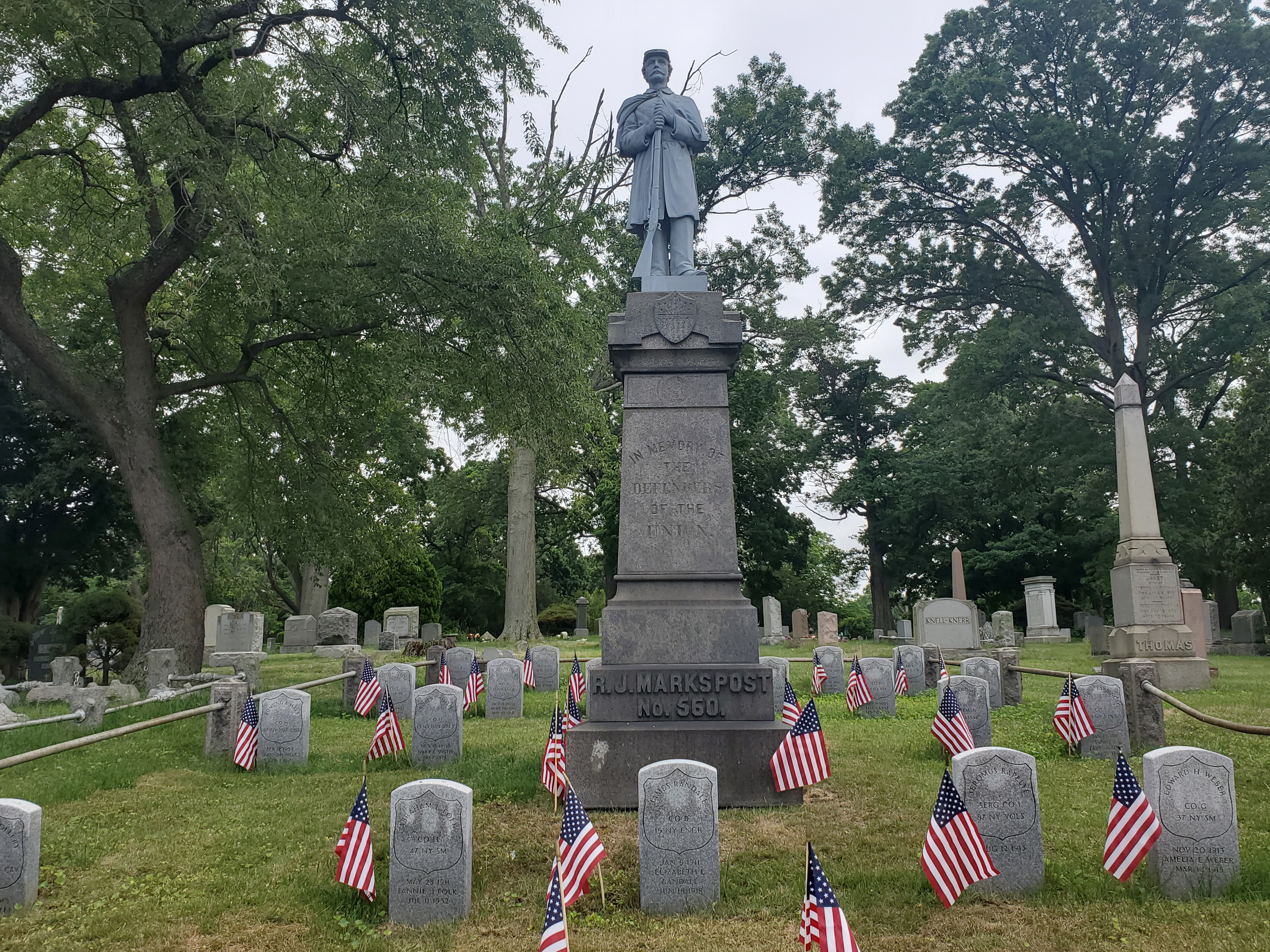
View of Civil War graves at Mt Olivet Cemetery guarded by a statue of a union soldier
