= Ironweed (film) =

1987 film by Héctor Babenco

- Theatrical release poster by John Alvin
- Directed by: Héctor Babenco
- Screenplay by: William Kennedy
- Based on: Ironweed; 1983 novel by William Kennedy
- Produced by: Keith Barish; Marcia Nasatir
- Starring: Jack Nicholson; Meryl Streep; Carroll Baker; Michael O'Keefe; Fred Gwynne; Diane Venora; Tom Waits
- Cinematography: Lauro Escorel
- Edited by: Anne Goursaud
- Music by: John Morris
- Production companies: Taft Entertainment Pictures; Keith Barish Productions; Home Box Office
- Distributed by: Tri-Star Pictures
- Release date: December 18, 1987
- Running time: 143 minutes
- Country: United States
- Language: English
- Budget: $27 million
- Box office: $7.3 million

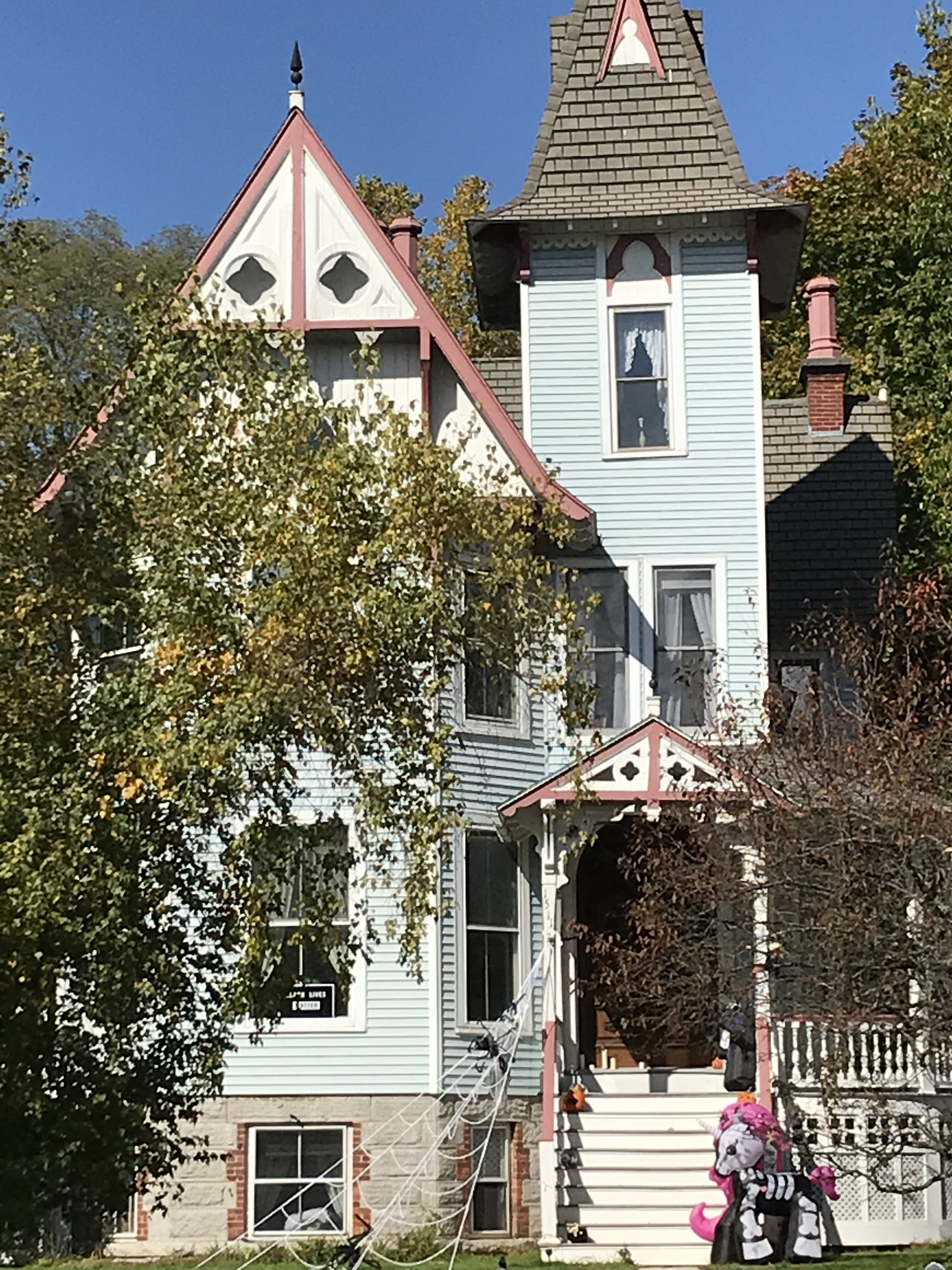
Victorian house, known as the Dillenbeck House, in Slingerlands, NY (outside Albany), used in the film Ironweed.

Ironweed is a 1987 American tragedy film directed by Héctor Babenco. Adapted to the screen by William Kennedy from his similarly named Pulitzer Prize–winning novel, Ironweed stars Jack Nicholson and Meryl Streep, with Carroll Baker, Michael O'Keefe, Diane Venora, Fred Gwynne, Nathan Lane, and Tom Waits in supporting roles. The story concerns the relationship of a homeless couple—Francis, an alcoholic, and Helen, a terminally ill woman—during the years following the Great Depression. Major portions of the film were shot on location in Albany, New York. The film received mixed reviews and was a box-office bomb, but Nicholson and Streep received Oscar nominations for Best Actor and Best Actress, respectively, for their performances.

== Synopsis ==
The story is set during the 1930s Great Depression. Francis Phelan, a washed-up and retired baseball player, deserted his family in the 1910s after accidentally dropping his infant son, causing the child's death. It is implied that Francis was drunk at the time, but he claims he was just tired and fails to understand why no one believed him. Francis becomes a vagrant, roaming streets and punishing himself by recalling men he knew who died years earlier in different circumstances. Wandering into his hometown of Albany on Halloween in 1938, Phelan seeks out his lover and drinking companion, Helen Archer. The two meet up in a mission managed by Reverend Chester, and later in Oscar Reo's gin mill. Over the next few days, Phelan takes a few menial jobs to support Helen, while haunted by visions of his past. Eventually, Francis returns to his old family house and tries to make peace with his wife Annie, his son Billy, and his daughter Peg. Meanwhile, local vigilantes attempt to violently drive the homeless out of Albany. During the course of the day, a series of events unfolds that permanently change Francis' life.

== Cast ==
- Jack Nicholson as Francis Phelan
- Meryl Streep as Helen Archer
- Carroll Baker as Annie Phelan
- Michael O'Keefe as Billy Phelan
- Diane Venora as Margaret "Peg" Phelan
- Fred Gwynne as Oscar Reo
- Margaret Whitton as Katrina Dougherty
- Tom Waits as Rudy
- Nathan Lane as Harold Allen
- James Gammon as Reverend Chester
- Laura Esterman as Nora Lawlor
- Joe Grifasi as Jackson
- Richard Hamilton as Donovan
- Hy Anzell as Rosskam
- Ted Levine as Pete "Pocono Pete"
- Black-Eyed Susan as Clara
- Lola Pashalinski as Turkey Woman
- Frank Whaley as Young Francis Phelan
- Louis St. Louis as Pianist
- Matt McGrath as "Goblin"
- Boris McGiver as The Clerk

== Reception ==
=== Critical response ===
The film received mixed reviews. On Rotten Tomatoes, the film has an approval rating of 58% based on reviews from 26 critics. The website's critics consensus reads, "Jack Nicholson and Meryl Streep play masterfully off each, but Ironweed's unrelenting bleakness proves to be more monotonous than compelling." Metacritic, which uses a weighted average, assigned the film a score of 56 out of 100, based on 16 critics, indicating "mixed or average" reviews. At the time of its release, it garnered enthusiasm because of the presence of stars Jack Nicholson and Meryl Streep.

Roger Ebert wrote, "Nicholson and Streep play drunks in Ironweed, and actors are said to like to play drunks, because it gives them an excuse for overacting. But there is not much visible 'acting' in this movie; the actors are too good for that." Ebert gave the film three stars out of four.

Streep received raves from most critics. Janet Maslin of The New York Times wrote that "Meryl Streep, as ever, is uncanny. Miss Streep uses the role of Helen as an opportunity to deliver a stunning impersonation of a darty-eyed, fast-talking woman of the streets, an angry, obdurate woman with great memories and no future. There isn't much more to the film's Helen than this, and indeed the character may go no deeper, but she's a marvel all the same. Behind the runny, red-rimmed eyes, the nervous chatter, and the haunted expression, Miss Streep is even more utterly changed than her costar, and she even sings well. The sequence in which Helen entertains the real and imagined patrons of a bar room with a rendition of 'He's Me Pal' is a standout."

Frederic and Mary Ann Brussat appreciated the film's spiritual message, writing, "Mixing realistic and surreal scenes, Argentinean director Héctor Babenco puts the accent on what he calls the spiritual dimensions of William Kennedy's Pulitzer Prize-winning novel... If you ride with the emotional undertow of Ironweed, there's no way you'll ever look at street people in quite the same way".

== Awards and nominations ==
Award	Category	Subject	Result
Academy Awards	Best Actor	Jack Nicholson	Nominated
Academy Awards	Best Actress	Meryl Streep	Nominated
Golden Globe Awards	Best Actor in a Motion Picture – Drama	Jack Nicholson	Nominated
Los Angeles Film Critics Association Awards	Best Actor	Jack Nicholson (Also for The Witches of Eastwick)	Won (Note: Tied with Steve Martin for Roxanne.)
Moscow International Film Festival	Golden St. George	Héctor Babenco	Nominated
New York Film Critics Circle Awards	Best Actor	Jack Nicholson (Also for Broadcast News and The Witches of Eastwick)	Won
