= Roscoe (novel) =

Book by William Kennedy

- First edition cover
- Author: William Kennedy
- Publisher: Viking Press
- Publication date: January 14, 2002
- ISBN: 0-670-03029-5

Roscoe is a 2002 novel by American writer William Kennedy. It depicts an aging politician who is a key behind-the-scenes player in Albany, New York's Democratic Party machine. Although many names have been changed and events added, the book is based on the O'Connell Machine that controlled Albany for decades. Some occurrences in the novel are based on actual events. Many of Kennedy's older relatives were minor figures in the machine.

In 2013, the novel was adapted as an opera by composer Evan Mack. It made its debut in 2016.
