= The Amalgamation Polka =

2006 book by Stephen Wright

- First edition
- Author: Stephen Wright
- Language: English
- Genre: War
- Publisher: Alfred A. Knopf
- Publication date: 2006
- Publication place: United States
- Media type: Print
- Pages: 323
- ISBN: 9780679451174

The Amalgamation Polka (2006) is the fourth novel by the writer Stephen Wright. It is set during the time of the American Civil War. The plot concerns the story of Liberty Fish and his travels after joining the Union army. The title refers to a 19th-century lithograph showing a social gathering in which the participants, unusually for the time, are both white and black. It is captioned “This blending of the two races (Caucasian and African) by amalgamation is just what is needed for the perfection of both.”

Liberty Fish is the son of two passionate abolitionists but whose grandparents were cruel slave-owners. The plot follows him from his birth to young adulthood, his enlistment in the Union army, and his quest to find his grandparents who he blames for the despair his mother feels. The tone has hints of dark humor and at times can be heavily surreal.

The Los Angeles Times gave the novel a positive review; critic Mark Rozzo noted: “The effect here is of Wright’s harnessing the supersaturated prose of the period—the stuff that Edmund Wilson once derisively called 'coagulated'—to a modern, post-Vietnam sensibility accustomed to flying body parts…. In these battle scenes, we feel as if we’ve stumbled across the infernal manuscripts of a long-lost literary talent, as if the scary ellipses of The Red Badge of Courage were being filled in by a chronicler as ravenous for bodily data—in this case, Minie balls thunking into men, frothing chest wounds—as Whitman.” The New York Times compared the story to the obvious Heart of Darkness, but also said, "Alice's Adventures in Wonderland is a better bet (on the plot). Most of the people Liberty meets (and not just in the South) are what the Cheshire Cat would call 'mad,' from a shaggy hermit to the Georgia farmer who secedes from the Confederacy by reclaiming his little plot of land in the name of the Union."
