= Legs Diamond =

American gangster (1897–1931)

Jack Diamond
- Mugshot of Jack Diamond, 1929
- Born: July 10, 1897; Philadelphia, Pennsylvania, U.S.
- Died: December 18, 1931 (aged 34); Albany, New York, U.S.
- Cause of death: Gunshot
- Resting place: Mount Olivet Cemetery; Queens, New York, U.S.
- Other names: John Nolan; Gentleman Jack
- Occupation: Bootlegger
- Criminal charges: Burglary (February 14, 1914); Desertion from US Army (1918–1919); Kidnapping (1930)—sentenced to 4 years {twice acquitted

Jack "Legs" Diamond (possibly born John Thomas Diamond, though disputed; July 10, 1897 – December 18, 1931), also known as John Nolan and Gentleman Jack, was an Irish-American gangster in Philadelphia and New York City during the Prohibition era. A bootlegger and close associate of gambler Arnold Rothstein, Diamond survived a number of attempts on his life between 1916 and 1931, causing him to be known as the "clay pigeon of the underworld". In 1930, Diamond's nemesis Dutch Schultz remarked to his own gang, "Ain't there nobody that can shoot this guy so he don't bounce back?"

== Early life ==
Jack Diamond was born July 10, 1897, to Sara and John Moran, who emigrated from Ireland to Philadelphia, Pennsylvania, US in 1891. In 1899, Jack's younger brother Eddie was born. Jack and Eddie both struggled through grade school, and Sara suffered from severe arthritis and other health problems. She died on December 24, 1913, following complications brought on by a bacterial infection and a high fever. John then moved his family to Brooklyn, New York.

Diamond soon joined a Manhattan street gang called the Hudson Dusters. His first arrest for burglary occurred when he broke into a jewelry store on February 4, 1914. Diamond served in the United States Army in World War I but was convicted and jailed for desertion in 1918 or 1919. He served two years of a three- to five-year sentence at Leavenworth Military Prison. After being released in 1921, Diamond became a hired thug and later personal bodyguard for gambler Arnold Rothstein.

== Lifestyle ==
Diamond was known for leading a rather flamboyant lifestyle. He was an energetic individual—his nickname "Legs" derived either from his being a good dancer or from how fast he could escape his enemies. His wife Alice was never supportive of his life of crime but did not do much to dissuade him from it. Diamond was a womanizer; his best-known mistress was showgirl and dancer Marion "Kiki" Roberts.

== Prohibition and the Manhattan Bootleg Wars ==
In the late 1920s, Prohibition was in force, and the sale of beer and other alcoholic beverages was illegal in the United States. Diamond traveled to Europe to acquire beer and narcotics but failed. However, he did obtain liquor, which was dumped overboard in partially full barrels that floated to Long Island as ships entered New York Harbor. Diamond paid children a nickel for every barrel they brought to his trucks.

Following the death of Jacob "Little Augie" Orgen, Diamond oversaw illegal alcohol sales in downtown Manhattan via the Hotsy Totsy Club, an establishment partly owned by Diamond on Broadway. This work brought him into conflict with Dutch Schultz, who wanted to move beyond his base in Harlem. Diamond also ran into trouble with other gangs in the city. On July 14, 1929, Diamond and fellow gang member Charles Entratta shot three drunken brawlers in the Hotsy Totsy Club; two of the brawlers, William Cassidy and Simon Walker, were killed, while the survivor, Peter Cassidy, was severely wounded. The club's bartender, three waiters and the hat check girl "vanished" (one of them was found shot dead in New Jersey). Diamond was not charged, but he was forced to close the club.

In 1930, Diamond and two henchmen kidnapped truck driver Grover Parks in Cairo, New York, demanding to know where he had obtained his load of hard cider. When Parks denied carrying anything, Diamond and his men beat and tortured Parks, eventually letting him go. A few months later, Diamond was charged with the kidnapping of James Duncan. He was sent to Catskill, New York, for his first trial, but he was acquitted. However, he was convicted in a federal case on related charges and sentenced to four years in jail. Diamond was tried in December 1931 in Troy, New York, also for kidnapping, but was once again acquitted.

== Trip to Europe ==
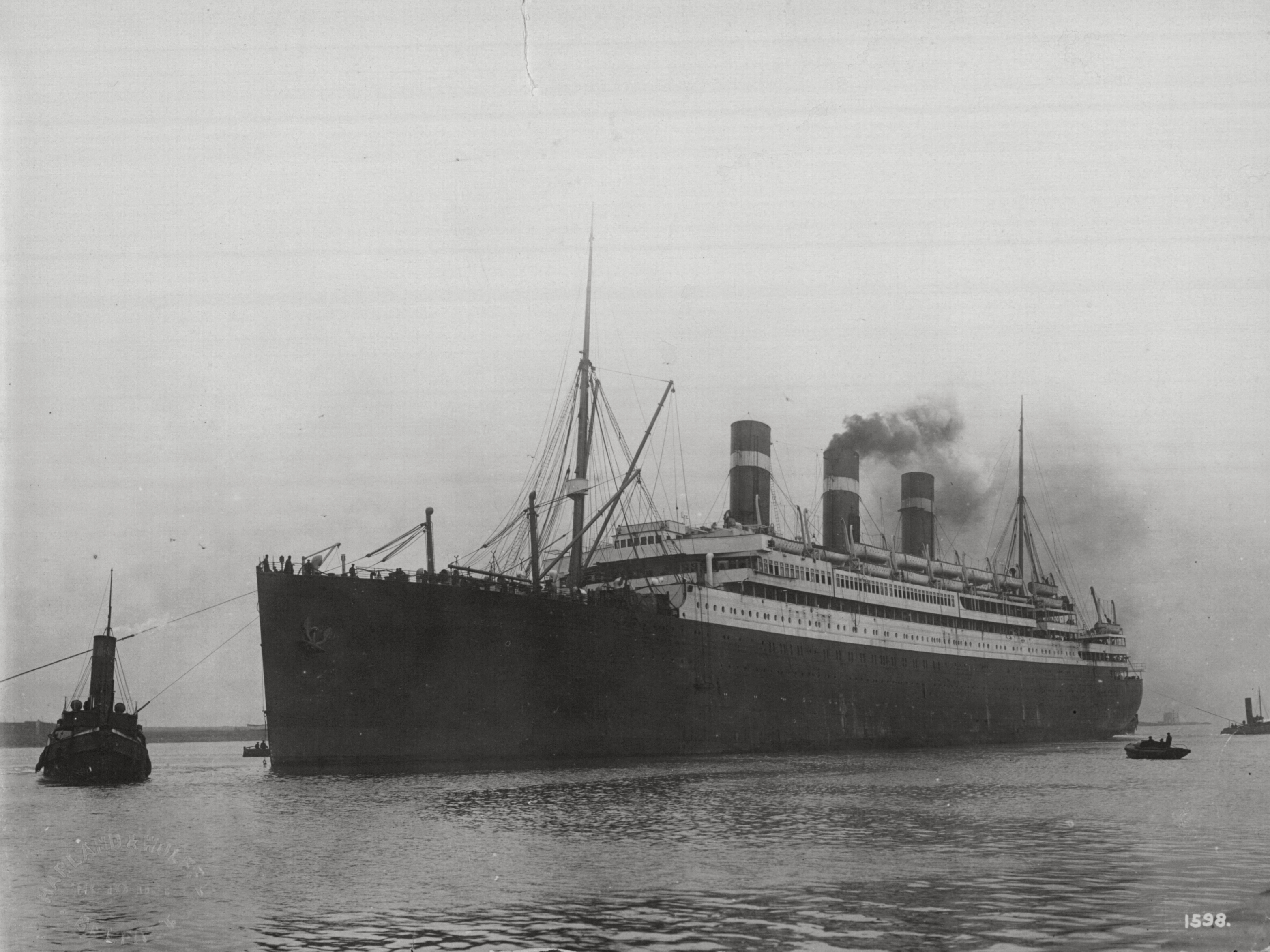
The liner Belgenland, on which Diamond voyaged to Europe in 1930

On August 23, 1930, Diamond, under the false name John Nolan, boarded the ocean liner Belgenland, bound for Europe. The New York City Police Department (NYPD) suspected that he might have left the U.S. aboard RMS Olympic or RMS Baltic, but he was not found on either ship when they reached Europe. The NYPD then sent a wireless telegraph message to the crew of Belgenland, who replied that a man similar to Diamond's description was among the passengers. Diamond spent much of the voyage in the ship's smoking room playing poker; one report claimed that he won thousands of dollars in this game. Belgenland's officers, however, refuted this, saying his winnings were small.

The NYPD telegraphed police in England, France and Belgium with the warning that Diamond was an undesirable character. When Belgenland reached Plymouth on August 31, Scotland Yard officers told Diamond he would not be allowed to land in England. Diamond told reporters that he wanted to travel to the French spa town of Vichy for "the cure". Diamond disembarked in Antwerp on September 1, where Belgian police took him to their headquarters. Eventually, Diamond agreed to voluntarily leave Belgium and was put on a train to Germany. When his train reached Aachen, German police arrested him. On September 6, the German government decided to deport Diamond; he was driven to Hamburg and put on the cargo ship Hannover for passage to Philadelphia.

On September 23, Hannover arrived in Philadelphia, and Diamond immediately was arrested by the Philadelphia police. At a court hearing that day, the judge said he would release Diamond if he left Philadelphia within the hour. Diamond agreed.

== Assassination attempts and prosecution ==
On October 24, 1924, Diamond was shot and wounded by shotgun pellets, reportedly after trying to hijack liquor trucks belonging to a rival crime syndicate.

On October 16, 1927, Diamond tried to stop the murder of "Little Augie" Orgen. Diamond's brother Eddie was Orgen's bodyguard, but Diamond substituted for Eddie that day. As Orgen and Diamond were walking down a street on Manhattan's Lower East Side, three young men approached them and started shooting. Orgen was fatally wounded, and Diamond was shot twice below the heart. Diamond was taken to Bellevue Hospital, where he eventually recovered. Police interviewed Diamond in the hospital, but he refused to identify any suspects or help the investigation in any way. Police initially suspected that Diamond was an accomplice and charged him with homicide, but the charge was dropped. The assailants were supposedly hired by Louis Buchalter and Gurrah Shapiro, who were seeking to encroach on Orgen's garment-district labor rackets.

On October 12, 1930, Diamond was shot and wounded at the Hotel Monticello on Manhattan's West Side. Two men forced their way into Diamond's room and shot him five times. Still in his pajamas, Diamond staggered into the hallway and collapsed. When asked later by the police commissioner how he managed to walk out of the room, Diamond said he drank two shots of whiskey first. Diamond was rushed to the Polyclinic Hospital, where he eventually recovered. He was discharged from Polyclinic on December 30, 1930.

On April 21, 1931, Diamond was arrested in Catskill on assault charges for the Parks beating in 1930. Two days later, he was released from the county jail on $25,000 bond. Five days later, Diamond was again shot and wounded at the Aratoga Inn, a road house near Cairo. After eating in the dining room with three companions, Diamond was shot three times and collapsed by the front door. A local resident drove Diamond to a hospital in Albany, where he was reputed to have told the attending surgeon, "they have not yet made the bullet that will kill me." Diamond eventually recovered. On May 1, while Diamond was still in the hospital, the New York State Police seized over $5,000 worth of illegal beer and alcohol from his hiding places in Cairo and at the Aratoga Inn.

In August 1931, Diamond and Paul Quattrocchi went on trial for bootlegging. The same month, Diamond was convicted and sentenced to four years in state prison. In September 1931, Diamond appealed his conviction.

== Death ==
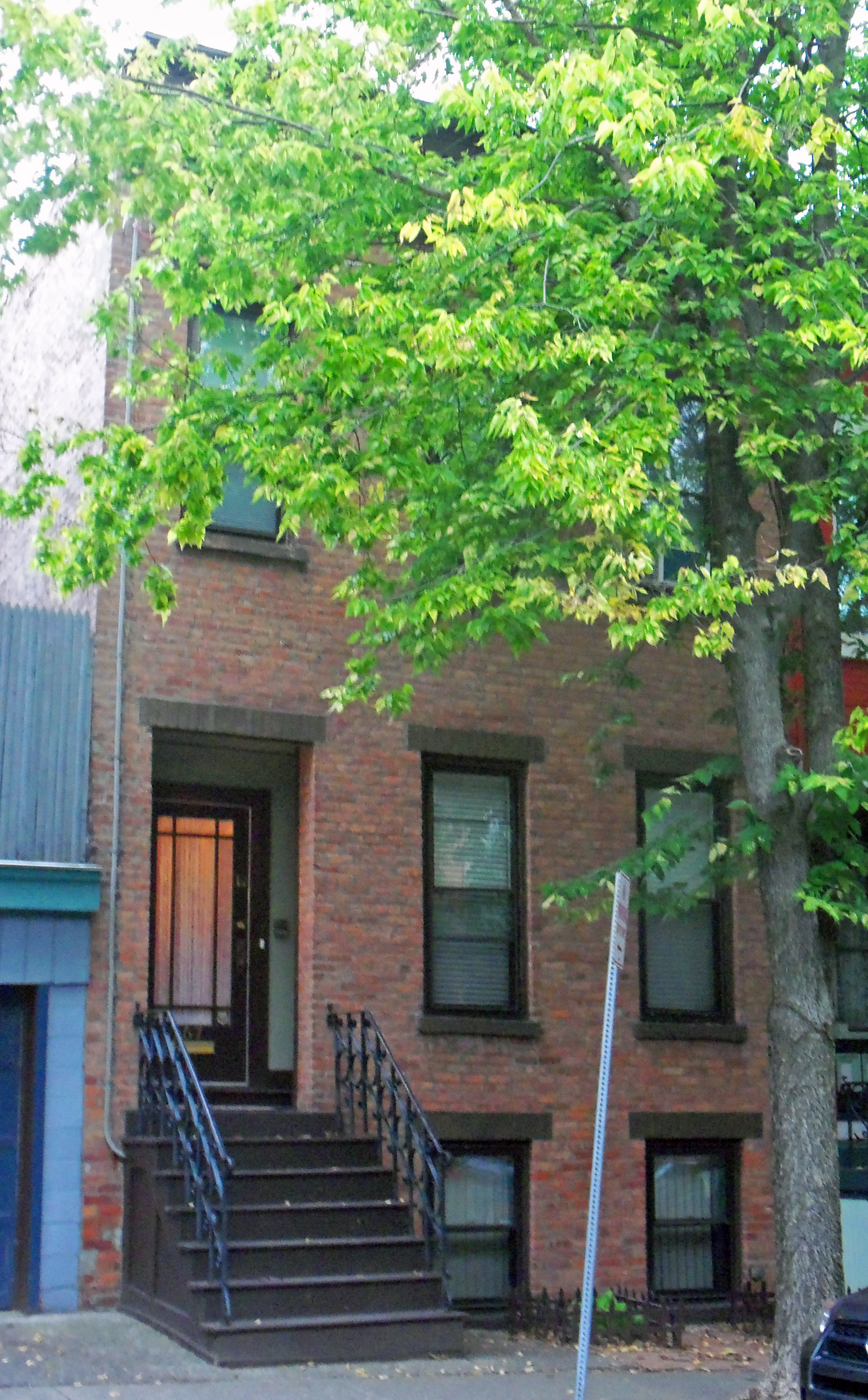
House at 67 Dove Street, where Diamond was murdered in 1931

On December 18, 1931, Diamond's enemies finally caught up with him. Diamond had been staying in a rooming house on Dove Street in Albany while on trial for kidnapping in Troy. On the night of his acquittal, on December 17, Diamond, his family and friends visited a restaurant in Albany. At 1 a.m., Diamond and mistress, Marion "Kiki" Roberts, entertained themselves at the Rain-Bo Room of the Kenmore Hotel on North Pearl Street.

At 4:30 a.m., Diamond drunkenly went back to the rooming house and passed out on his bed. Two gunmen entered his room around an hour later. One man held Diamond down, and the other shot him three times in the back of the head.

There has been much speculation as to who was responsible for the murder. Likely candidates include Abraham Weinberg, Schultz, the Oley Brothers, the Albany Police Department, and relatives of Red Cassidy, another Irish American gangster at the time. According to author and journalist William Kennedy, Dan O'Connell, who ran the local Democratic political machine, ordered Diamond's execution, which was carried out by the Albany police. The following are Dan O'Connell's own words recorded during a 1974 interview by Kennedy for his 1983 nonfiction book O Albany!: Improbable City of Political Wizards, Fearless Ethnics, Spectacular Aristocrats, Splendid Nobodies, and Underrated Scoundrels, which appear on pages 203 and 204:

In order for the Mafia to move in they had to have protection, and they know they'll never get it in this town. We settled that years ago. Legs Diamond...called up one day and said he wanted to go into the 'insurance' business here. He was going to sell strong-arm 'protection' to the merchants. I sent word to him that he wasn't going to do any business in Albany and we didn't expect to see him in town the next morning. He never started anything here.

Prior brought him around here...but brought him around once too often. Fitzpatrick finished Legs.

O'Connell added that William Fitzpatrick (a police sergeant at the time and later chief) and Diamond were "sitting in the same room and (Fitzpatrick) followed him out. Fitzpatrick told him he'd kill him if he didn't keep going.

Given the power that the O'Connell machine held in Albany and its determination to prevent organized crime, other than their own, from threatening their monopoly of vice in the city, some accept this account of the story. For those believing this theory, Fitzpatrick's promotion to chief of police is said to have been a reward for executing Diamond. In 1945, Chief Fitzpatrick was shot and killed in his own office by John McElveney, an Albany police detective. McElveney was sentenced to 20 years to life in prison. He was released in 1957 when his sentence was commuted by Governor W. Averell Harriman.

On December 23, 1931, Diamond was buried at Mount Olivet Cemetery in Maspeth, Queens. There was no church service or graveside ceremony. Family and spectators numbering 200 attended the interment; no criminal figures were spotted.

On July 1, 1933, Alice Kenny Diamond (age 33), Diamond's widow, was found shot to death in her Brooklyn apartment. It was speculated that she was shot by Diamond's enemies to keep her quiet.

== See also ==
- List of unsolved deaths

== In popular culture ==
- Released on February 3, 1960, the film The Rise and Fall of Legs Diamond was directed by director Budd Boetticher and stars Ray Danton and Warren Oates. The film was nominated for AFI's Top 10 Gangster Films list.
- On October 20, 1960, Diamond was played by Steven Hill in the episode "Jack 'Legs' Diamond" of the series The Untouchables starring Robert Stack.
- The 1963 Looney Tunes short The Unmentionables features an appearance by "Jack 'Legs' Rhinestone," who is shown to feature a pair of ladylike legs. His last name is a reference to the diamond simulant of the same name.
- A Terry Gilliam animation sequence from the British TV show Monty Python's Flying Circus (1969-1973) features a gangster chicken by the name of "Eggs" Diamond.
- Legs, the first book in author William Kennedy's Albany cycle, was released in 1975. It follows Diamond to his death.
- The Broadway show Legs Diamond was a musical starring Peter Allen. It ran briefly in late 1988 through early 1989. It lasted just 64 performances, and it is regarded as one of Broadway's legendary high-profile flops.
- Josh Mosby portrayed Legs Diamond in the 1993 film The Outfit.
- Wu-Tang Clan member Raekwon the Chef's 1995 debut hip hop album Only Built for Cuban Linx features a mafioso theme in which he and each guest artist assume a "Wu-Gambino" nickname. Raekwon's nickname is Lex Diamond, an homage to Legs Diamond.
- Legs Diamond provides the background to the 1996 short story "Running from Legs" by Ed McBain.
