= Stephen Wright (writer) =

American novelist

Stephen Wright (born 1946) is a novelist based in New York City known for his use of surrealistic imagery and dark comedy. His work has varied from hallucinatory accounts of war (Meditations in Green), a family drama among UFO cultists (M31: A Family Romance), carnivalesque novel on a serial killer (Going Native), to a picaresque taking place during the Civil War (The Amalgamation Polka).

Going Native was ranked #13 on Larry McCaffery's 20th Century's Greatest Hits: 100 English-Language Books of Fiction.

== Biography ==
Stephen Wright was born in Warren, Pennsylvania. He was drafted in the army and served at the Phu Bai Combat Base during the Vietnam War. When he returned, he received his Master of Fine Arts from the Iowa Writers' Workshop. He has received a Whiting Award in Fiction, a Guggenheim Fellowship, and a Lannan Literary Fellowship. Wright has taught writing and literature at Princeton University, Brown University, and The New School.

== Work ==
- Meditations in Green, (1983)
- M31: A Family Romance, (1988), ISBN 0517568691
- Going Native, (1994), ISBN 0374164908
- The Amalgamation Polka, (2006)
- Processed Cheese, 2020

== Quotes ==
"Precisely that brutal hallucination we desperately wanted to end." Don DeLillo on Meditations in Green.

"A sensational prime time novel...a pornographic twilight zone of beebee-eyed serial killers, drug-stunned pants-dropping road-warriors and 'marauding armies of mental vampires,' a nightmarish country of unparalleled savagery, where there is no longer any membrane between screen and life and the monster image feed is inexhaustible." Robert Coover on Going Native.

"This dark and lyrical tale of madness and prophecy speaks uncannily from within its period, in the tradition of heartbroken humor which America's lapses of faith in its own promise have always evoked in the finest of our storytellers, among whom Stephen Wright here honorably takes his place." Thomas Pynchon on The Amalgamation Polka.

"For Wright, America, past and present, is Wonderland, a place of marvels and horrors from which not even the fortunate escape with their heads. " Laura Miller (writer), front page, New York Times Book Review.

"Brutal subject matter and a knife-edged style are the formula for noir and Going Native is glitteringly noir. Often it reminds me of Orson Welles' deliciously sleazy Touch of Evil." The New Yorker

“Wright is a star of the first magnitude.” The Washington Post
