= Bloodstain =

Bloodstain or blood stain may refer to:

- Blood residue, common bloodstains
- Bloodstain pattern analysis, one of several specialties in the field of forensic science
- Bloodstain (Souls series), a game mechanic used in the Souls series of video games
- "Bloodstain", a song by UNKLE from the 1998 album Psyence Fiction
- "Bloodstain", the alternative name for the song "Shirt" by SZA from the 2022 album SOS
- Bloodstain, a webcomic series by Linda Lukšić Šejić, sharing continuity with Sunstone (comics)
- Bloodstain, a Swedish thrash metal band

Bloodstained or Blood Stained may refer to:

- Bloodstained (series), a series of dark fantasy video games
- "Blood Stained", a Judas Priest song from the album Jugulator
- Blood Stained: When No One Comes Looking, a biography; see David Edward Maust#In popular media

== See also ==
- Blood (disambiguation)
- Stain (disambiguation)
