= Legs (novel) =

1975 novel by William Kennedy

- First edition
- Author: William Kennedy
- Language: English
- Publisher: Coward, McCann & Geoghegan
- Publication date: 1975
- Publication place: United States
- Media type: Print (hardback & paperback)
- Pages: 317 pp
- ISBN: 0-698-10672-5
- OCLC: 1345969
- Dewey Decimal: 813/.5/4
- LC Class: PZ4.K3615 Le PS3561.E428
- Preceded by: The Ink Truck
- Followed by: Billy Phelan's Greatest Game

Legs is a 1975 novel by William Kennedy. It is the first book in Kennedy's Albany Cycle.

== Plot summary ==
The book chronicles the life of the gangster Jack 'Legs' Diamond. It is told from the perspective of Jack's lawyer, Marcus Gorman. Marcus becomes involved with "Legs" Diamond to add excitement to his otherwise boring life, and the best way to do this was by immortalizing a highly popular gangster. Through Gorman's eyes, Kennedy is able to elicit sympathy for the criminal, transposing this sympathy into the context of America during the 1920s and 30s: excess, collapse, destitution, and analysis of right and wrong, good and evil.

== Adaptations ==
In 2009, Audible.com produced an audio version of Legs, narrated by Joe Barrett, as part of its Modern Vanguard line of audiobooks.
