= Rikki Ducornet =

American poet

- Born: Erica DeGre; April 19, 1943 (age 83); Canton, New York, U.S.
- Education: Bard College
- Occupations: Novelist; poet; illustrator
- Writing career
- Language: English
- Period: 1984–present
- Subjects: Sexuality, religion
- Movements: Surrealism, postmodernism
- Website: www.rikkiducornet.com

Rikki Ducornet (/ˈrɪki duːkɔːrˈneɪ/; born Erica DeGre; April 19, 1943) is an American writer, poet, and artist. Her work has been described as "linguistically explosive and socially relevant," and praised for "deploy[ing] tactics familiar to the historical avant-garde, including an emphasis on gnosticism, cosmology, diablerie, bestiary, eroticism, and revolution, to produce an astounding body of work, cogent and ethical in its beauty and spirit."

== Biography ==
Rikki Ducornet was born in Canton, New York. Gerard DeGré, Ducornet's father, was a professor of social philosophy, and her mother Muriel hosted community-interest programs on radio and television. Ducornet was raised in a multicultural household as her father was Cuban and her mother was Russian-Jewish. Ducornet's father encouraged her to read books by authors such as Albert Camus and Lao Tzu, and to pursue an exploration of knowledge. Alice in Wonderland was an especially formative book, and inspired her 1993 novel The Jade Cabinet, in which Lewis Carroll is a major character. Ducornet's father also taught her rumba at the age of ten. Ducornet spent part of her childhood in Egypt, the setting for her 2003 novel Gazelle, after her father received an invitation to teach at the University of Cairo. Ducornet also spent two years in Algeria in the mid-1960s after the Algerian war of Independence.

Ducornet grew up on the campus of Bard College in Annandale-on-Hudson, in New York, earning a B.A. in Fine Arts there in 1964. While at Bard she met Robert Coover and Robert Kelly, two authors who shared Ducornet's fascination with metamorphosis and provided early models of how fiction might express this interest. In 1972 she moved to the Loire Valley in France with her then husband, Guy Ducornet, where she lived for the next eighteen years. As a young girl, Ducornet dreamed of being a visual artist and it wasn't until she moved to France with her husband that she began to seriously think about writing. Being in Europe brought out something new: as Ducornet explained, "I was acutely aware of language". It was in France too, that she raised her son, Jean-Yves Ducornet, who later became a noted composer/arranger/producer. In 1988 she won a Bunting Institute fellowship at Radcliffe, and in 1989 accepted a teaching position in the English Department at the University of Denver. In 2007, she replaced retired Dr. Ernest Gaines as Writer in Residence at the University of Louisiana at Lafayette. Ducornet currently lives in Port Townsend, Washington.

Ducornet is the subject of the Steely Dan song "Rikki Don't Lose That Number." Steely Dan singer Donald Fagen had met her at Bard College. Ducornet says they met at a college party, and even though she was married at the time, he gave her his number. Ducornet was intrigued by Fagen and was tempted to call him, but she decided against it. She later told an interviewer, "Philosophically it's an interesting song; I mean I think his 'number' is a cipher for the self."

== Writing ==
Ducornet is known for her writing characterized by motifs of nature, Eros, abusive authority, subversion, and the creative imagination. Ducornet hand writes the drafts of her books with pen and ink and when writing, Ducornet does not begin with a set plot but rather derives her stories from the hearts of her subjects. In Ducornet's first book, The Butcher’s Tales, she dealt with ideas of "conveying moral understanding, a visceral need to confront abusive Authority in its many forms, and to fully engage the beautiful", all themes that reoccur in her later work. In addition to being known as a writer, Ducornet also works in the mediums of painting and printmaking. Ducornet has illustrated books by Jorge Luis Borges, Robert Coover, Forrest Gander, Kate Bernheimer, and Anne Waldman among others. A collection of Ducornet's papers, including prints and drawings, are in the permanent collection of the Ohio State University Rare Books and Manuscripts Library, with further papers at the University of California San Diego library. In 2017, Ducornet partnered with multimedia artist Margie McDonald in a collaborative installation show at the Northwind Arts Center in Port Townsend. The show exhibited a series of 25-foot-long painted scrolls hand painted by Ducornet and multimedia wire sculptures by McDonald. These scrolls were painted during a month long residency at the Vermont Studio Center prior to Ducornet and McDonald's collaboration. Her art has also been exhibited in Amnesty International’s travelling exhibit "I Welcome," in support of the world’s refugees.

Ducornet uses themes of nature and magic in many of her works. Ducornet’s Tetralogy of Elements was influenced by the ancient idea of the four elements: earth, fire, water, and air. Each of the four elements are featured in The Stain (1984), Entering Fire (1986), The Fountains of Neptune (1989), and The Jade Cabinet (1993), respectively. Ducornet’s book Phosphor In Dreamland, is sometimes included alongside the original tetralogy as presenting a fifth element, being light or dream.

Ducornet was influenced by surrealism and has written about the movement. She wrote the foreword to Penelope Rosemont’s Surrealist Experiences: 1001 Dawns, 221 Midnights (Black Swan Press, 2000). In addition, Ducornet is a contributor to (on "Imagination") and the subject of an entry in the three-volume International Encyclopedia of Surrealism; for her entry in the latter, Ducornet told critic Michelle Ryan-Sautour that she did not know "what it means to ‘do’ surrealism. I do know, however, that my process is informed by, energized by, sparked . . . by memory, dreams, reflection AND HAZARD and intuition, EROS above all. . . . Surrealism has been an embodiment of some kind, a luminous . . . haunting. It is the name of the country where I was born."

== Awards ==
- Arts and Letters Award in Literature, American Academy of Arts and Letters (2008)
- Lannan Literary Award for Fiction (2004)
- Charles Flint Kellogg Award in Arts and Letters (1998)
- Critics Choice Award (1995)
- Lannan Literary Award for Fiction (1993)

== Bibliography ==
Novels

- The Elements tetralogy:
  - The Stain, Chatto & Windus, London (1984); Grove Press, New York (1984); revised edition Dalkey Archive Press, Normal IL (1995)
  - Entering Fire, Chatto & Windus, London (1986); City Lights, San Francisco (1986)
  - The Fountains of Neptune, McClelland & Steward, Toronto (1989); Dalkey Archive Press, Normal, Illinois (1992)
  - The Jade Cabinet, Dalkey Archive Press, Normal, Illinois (1993)
- Phosphor in Dreamland, Dalkey Archive Press, Normal, Illinois (1995)
- The Fan-Maker's Inquisition, Henry Holt, New York (1999)
- Gazelle, Alfred A. Knopf, New York (2003)
- Netsuke: a novel, Coffee House Press, Minneapolis (2011)
- Brightfellow: a novel, Coffee House Press, Minneapolis (2016)
- Trafik: A Novel in Warp Drive, Coffee House Press, Minneapolis (2021)
- The Plotinus, Coffee House Press, Minneapolis (2023)

Short fiction collections

- The Butcher's Tales (1980)
- The Complete Butcher's Tales (1994)
- The Word 'Desire' (1997)
- The One Marvelous Thing (2008)

Poetry

- From The Star Chamber (as "Rikki") Fiddlehead Poetry Books, Fredericton NB (1974)
- Wild Geraniums Actual Size Press, London (1975)
- Bouche a Bouche by Guy Ducornet & Rikki, Soror, Paris (1975)
- Weird Sisters (as "Rikki") Intermedia, Vancouver (1976)
- Knife Notebook (as "Rikki") Fiddlehead Poetry Books, Vancouver (1977)
- The Illustrated Universe (as "Rikki") Aya Press, Toronto (1979)
- The Cult of Seizure The Porcupine's Quill, Erin, Ontario (1989)

Essays

- The Monstrous and the Marvelous City Lights, San Francisco (1999)
- The Deep Zoo Coffee House Press, Minneapolis (2015)

Anthologies edited

- Shoes & Shit: Stories for Pedestrians edited by Geoff Hancock & Rikki Ducornet, Aya Press, Toronto (1984)

Children's books

- The Blue Bird Adaptation of Mme. D'Aulnoy's old French fairy tale, Alfred A. Knopf, New York (1970)
- Shazira Shazam and the Devil by Erica and Guy Ducornet, Prentice-Hall, Englewood Cliffs, New Jersey (1972)

Illustrations

- Spanking the Maid by Robert Coover (1981)
- Tlön, Uqbar, Orbis Tertius by Jorge Luis Borges (1983)
- Torn Wings and Faux Pas by Karen Elizabeth Gordon (1997)
- Horse, Flower, Bird by Kate Bernheimer (2010)

Forewords

- Surrealist Experiences: 1001 Dawns, 221 Midnights, by Penelope Rosemont. Black Swan Press (2000)
- Hum, by Michelle Richmond. Fiction Collective Two (2014)
