= Going Native (novel) =

Novel By Stephen Wright

- First edition
- Author: Stephen Wright
- Language: English
- Publisher: Farrar Straus & Giroux
- Publication date: 1994
- Dewey Decimal: 813.54
- LC Class: PS3573.R5433 G6

Going Native is the third novel written by Stephen Wright. First published in 1994 by Farrar Straus & Giroux, it is a portrait of irredeemable American culture.

The Los Angeles Times, in a book review, gave Going Native “remarkable distinction in the crowded fictional field of post-modern American nightmare.” In a review from the United Kingdom, The Independent calls Stephen Wright “a talented stylist: at its best his language, radiant with inhibition, has great clarity and power, and his dialogue, much of it soaked in the vernacular of the street with its cartoonish exaggeration and hilariously fractured syntax, is utterly convincing.”
