= The Stain (novel) =

Novel by Rikki Ducornet

- First (UK) edition, Chatto & Windus, 1984
- Author: Rikki Ducornet
- Cover artist: Guy Ducornet
- Language: English
- Series: Tetralogy of Elements (#1)
- Published: 1984 (Chatto & Windus, London)
- Publication place: United Kingdom
- Media type: Print (hardback)
- Pages: 191 (1st edition)
- ISBN: 0701127600
- Followed by: Entering Fire

The Stain is a 1984 novel of sexuality and religion by Rikki Ducornet, set in France's Loire Valley in the nineteenth century. It was Ducornet's first published novel; she has described it as being "about the Christian idea of sin".

== Plot ==
Towards the end of the nineteenth century, in the rural village of La Folie in France's Loire Valley, a girl is born with a birthmark on her face shaped like a dancing hare. After both her parents die young, Charlotte is raised by her uncle, a mild-mannered gardener with a stutter, and her aunt, a strict disciplinarian who regards her niece's birthmark as the brand of Satan. As Charlotte grows up, she tries to make sense of the world around her under the influence of her aunt and the other characters, including a travelling conman, a local exorcist, the village tramp, and a nearby community of nuns that eventually accepts Charlotte as a novitiate. The world around La Folie is a mysterious place: Charlotte sees religious signs everywhere, an ancient menhir stands just outside town, wolves prowl in the woods nearby, and the village exorcist is torn between serving God and serving Beelzebub.

== Development history ==
The village of La Folie is based on Le Puy-Notre-Dame, in the Maine-et-Loire department, where Rikki Ducornet lived with her French husband for twenty years. (Nearby villages Louerre and Louresse are mentioned in the novel.) The book was written in Le Puy, and Ducornet has described the book's genesis as stemming from a dream fuelled by encounters with real people in the village:

The Stain got kicked off when I came to know an old woman who was the only one who didn’t have a washing machine; she was still going down to the “lavoir” to do her laundry, and I would go there too, because there were a lot of insects to watch and frogs and other creatures, and we would talk about the past. She had been a child at the turn of the century, and she had memories from as far back as the 1880s. One day she was talking to me about birthmarks and how important they had been when she was a little girl. People living in the village believed that you would know how somebody had sinned because of the mark on their face, things like that. After that conversation, I took my bike on a wonderful ride through the vineyards, quite far from the village; as I was returning, the sun was setting, and I saw this creature bounding across a meadow. It looked like a ball of fire at first—an incredible incandescence; then it stopped and stared at me and I didn’t know what it was! I looked at it for a long time, and it looked at me, very intensely—so intensely that I finally had to turn away. Then it leapt off, and I realized it was an enormous hare. That night I had a dream of a woman giving birth to a child with a birthmark in the shape of a hare. It was really more like a vision than a dream, and I started up from it and immediately wrote my book’s first chapter.

— Rikki Ducornet, ‘A Conversation with Rikki Ducornet’

The book took three years to complete and was written "in a fever". Many of the characters were based on real people, including the exorcist.

=== Publication history ===
- 1984, United Kingdom, Chatto & Windus, ISBN 0701127600, hardback
- 1984, United States, Grove Press, ISBN 0394542843, hardback
- 1995, United States, Dalkey Archive Press, ISBN 1564780856, paperback
