= Ironweed (novel) =

1983 novel by William Kennedy

- First edition
- Author: William Kennedy
- Language: English
- Genre: Tragedy
- Publisher: Viking Press, NY
- Publication date: 1983
- Publication place: United States
- Media type: Print (hardback & paperback)
- Pages: 227 pp
- ISBN: 0-670-40176-5
- OCLC: 8709244
- Dewey Decimal: 813/.54 19
- LC Class: PS3561.E428 I7 1983
- Preceded by: Billy Phelan's Greatest Game
- Followed by: Quinn's Book

Ironweed is a 1983 novel by American author William Kennedy. Ironweed received the 1984 Pulitzer Prize for Fiction and is the third book in Kennedy's Albany Cycle. It is included in the Western Canon of the critic Harold Bloom. The novel was adapted into a 1987 film of the same name.

== Plot summary ==
Set during the Great Depression, Ironweed tells the story of a bum named Francis Phelan. Phelan is a native of Albany, New York who left his family after accidentally killing his infant son. The novel focuses on Phelan's return (after being gone for 22 years) to Albany over the triduum of All Hallows' Eve, All Saints' Day, and All Souls' Day. A surreal element is added to the narrative, as Phelan sees and tries to interact with dead people from his troubled past. The novel features characters that are present in some of Kennedy's other Albany Cycle books.

== Structure ==
The structure of the novel resembles the structure of Dante's Divine Comedy. The novel's epigraph is a quotation from Purgatorio:

To course o’er better waters
now hoists sail the little bark of my wit,
leaving behind her a sea so cruel.

== Critical response ==
Ironweed received positive reviews from The New York Times and the Washington Post. It won Kennedy a Pulitzer Prize and a National Book Critics Circle Award.

== Adaptations ==
Kennedy wrote the screenplay for the 1987 film version of Ironweed, which was directed by Héctor Babenco and starred Jack Nicholson and Meryl Streep. Major portions of the film were shot on location in Albany. The film was nominated for two Academy Awards: The Best Actor in a Leading Role (for Nicholson) and the Best Actress in a Leading Role (for Streep).

In 1986, Audio Partners produced an audiobook version of Ironweed, narrated by Jason Robards.
