= Billy Phelan's Greatest Game =

1978 novel by William Kennedy

- First edition
- Author: William Kennedy
- Language: English
- Publisher: The Viking Press
- Publication date: 1978
- Publication place: United States
- Media type: Print (hardback & paperback)
- Pages: 282 pp
- ISBN: 0-670-16667-7
- OCLC: 3630990
- Dewey Decimal: 813/.5/4
- LC Class: PZ4.K3615 Bi PS3561.E428
- Preceded by: Legs
- Followed by: Ironweed

Billy Phelan's Greatest Game is a 1978 novel by William Kennedy. It is the second book in Kennedy's Albany Cycle.

== Plot summary ==
The narrative is based on an actual event: The attempted 1933 kidnapping of John O'Connell Jr., the nephew of Albany Democratic boss Daniel P. O'Connell.

In 1930s Albany, New York, Billy Phelan is a hustler at pool, card sharp, bowler, and occasional bookmaker. Martin Daugherty is a reporter, and the son of a famous writer now grown old. Phelan and Daugherty become involved in the events surrounding the kidnapping of the son of a corrupt Albany political boss.

The kidnapping is the central point of the story, but Kennedy also details the everyday lives of the characters inhabiting Albany's working class and poor neighborhoods. Some of the characters, including Billy Phelan's father Francis, appear in Ironweed, the third installment of the Albany Cycle.

== Adaptations ==
In 2009, Audible.com produced an audio version of Billy Phelan's Greatest Game, narrated by Nick Sullivan, as part of its Modern Vanguard line of audiobooks.

== Sources ==
=== Internet ===
- Pierce, J. Kingston (July 13, 2012). "The Book You Have to Read: Billy Phelan's Greatest Game". The Rap Sheet. Seattle, WA: J. Kingston Pierce.

=== Books ===
- Fischer, Heinz-D.; Fischer, Erika J. (2002). Complete Biographical Encyclopedia of Pulitzer Prize Winners, 1917-2000. Munich, Germany: K. G. Saur. ISBN 978-3-598-30186-5.
