= William Kennedy (author) =

American writer and journalist (born 1928)

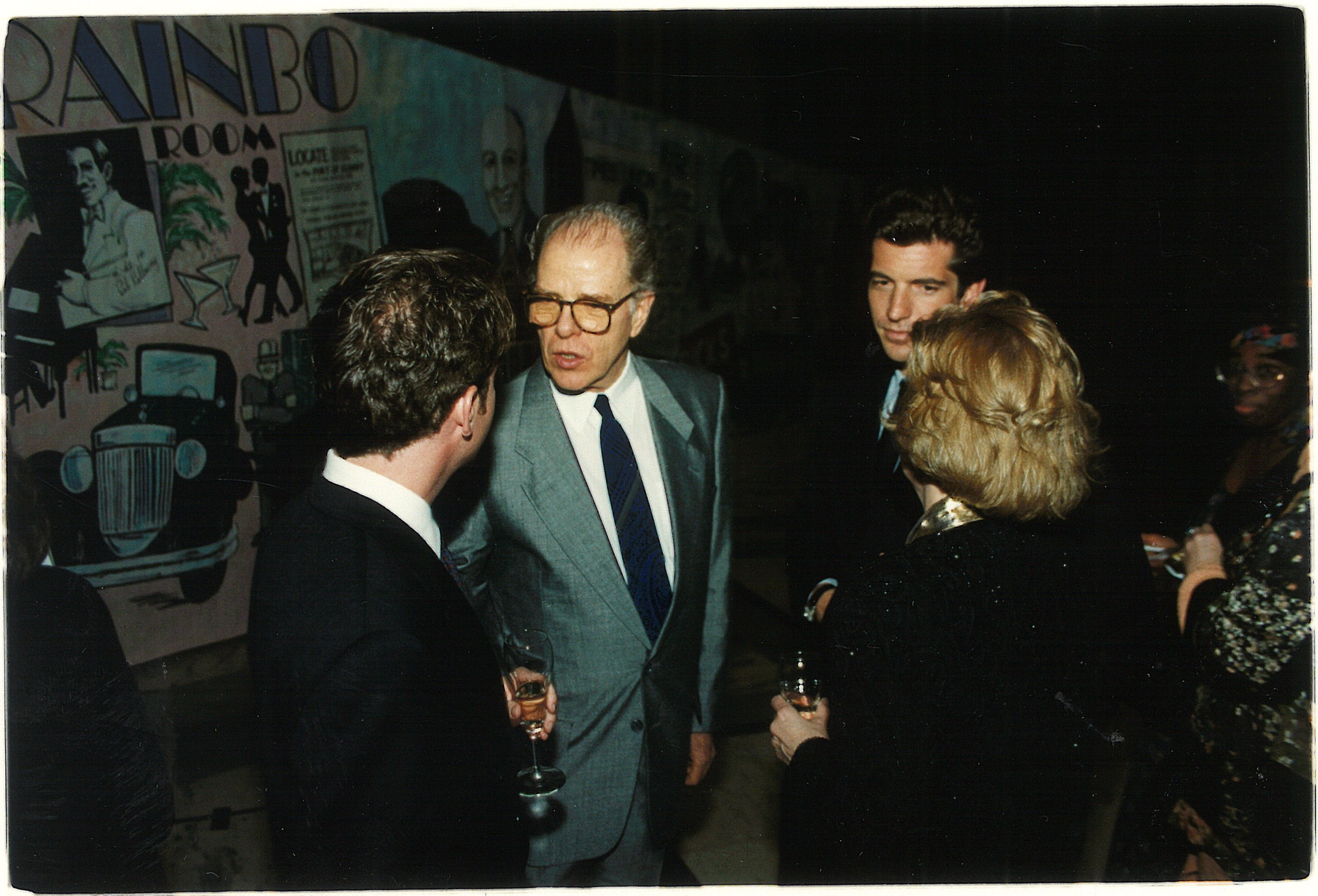
- William Kennedy (center) in 1996
- Born: William Joseph Kennedy; January 16, 1928 (age 98); Albany, New York, U.S.
- Education: Siena College (BA)
- Occupations: Author; journalist; historian
- Spouse: Dana Daisy Segarra Kennedy (m. 1957; died 2023)
- Children: 3
- Writing career
- Period: 1955–present
- Genres: Fiction, History, Supernatural
- Notable works: Legs, Billy Phelan's Greatest Game, Ironweed
- Notable awards: Pulitzer Prize for Fiction (1984)

William Joseph Kennedy (born January 16, 1928) is an American writer and journalist who won the 1984 Pulitzer Prize for his 1983 novel Ironweed.

Kennedy's other works include The Ink Truck (1969), Legs (1975), Billy Phelan's Greatest Game (1978), Roscoe (2002) and Changó's Beads and Two-Tone Shoes (2011). Many of his novels have featured the interactions of members of the fictional Irish-American Phelan family in Albany, New York.

Kennedy has also published a non-fiction book entitled O Albany!: Improbable City of Political Wizards, Fearless Ethnics, Spectacular Aristocrats, Splendid Nobodies, and Underrated Scoundrels (1983).

== Early life, family, and education ==
William Joseph Kennedy was born January 16, 1928, in Albany, New York to William and Mary Kennedy. He is an only child. Kennedy's parents were working-class Irish-Americans. Kennedy was raised Catholic and grew up in the North Albany neighborhood. He attended Public School 20 and Christian Brothers Academy. Kennedy studied at Siena College in Loudonville, New York, from which he graduated in 1949.

== Career ==
Kennedy began pursuing a career in journalism after college by joining the Post Star in Glens Falls as a sports reporter. He was drafted in 1950 and served in the U.S. Army, where he worked for an Army newspaper in Europe. After his discharge, Kennedy joined the Albany Times Union as a reporter. He then relocated to Puerto Rico in 1956 and became managing editor of the San Juan Star, a new English language newspaper. While living in San Juan, he befriended the journalist and author Hunter S. Thompson.

Kennedy, who had been eager to leave Albany, returned to his hometown in 1963. He worked for the Times Union as an investigative journalist, writing stories exposing activities of Daniel P. O'Connell and his political cronies in the dominant Democratic Party. He was nominated for a Pulitzer Prize in 1965 for a series of articles on ghettos.

Kennedy published his first novel, The Ink Truck, in 1969. The novel's main character is a columnist who leads a strike at his newspaper in Albany.

Kennedy lectured in creative writing and journalism from 1974 to 1982 at the University at Albany, becoming a full professor in 1983. He taught writing as a visiting professor at Cornell University during the 1982–1983 academic year.

Kennedy published Legs (about Jack (“Legs”) Diamond, a gangster killed in Albany in 1931) in 1975 and Billy Phelan’s Greatest Game (about a fictional Albany hustler) in 1978. While both novels were well received by critics, they did not sell well. Kennedy and his family experienced financial difficulties.

Kennedy's next novel, Ironweed (1983), was rejected by publishers 13 times. However, author Saul Bellow urged Viking Press to reconsider. Viking Press published the novel. The novel was commercially successful, and it won Kennedy a Pulitzer Prize and a National Book Critics Circle Award. The novel was adapted into a 1987 film of the same name for which Kennedy wrote the screenplay.

Kennedy also published a nonfiction book entitled O Albany!: Improbable City of Political Wizards, Fearless Ethnics, Spectacular Aristocrats, Splendid Nobodies, and Underrated Scoundrels (1983).

Kennedy's other novels include Quinn’s Book (1988), Very Old Bones (1992), The Flaming Corsage (1996), Roscoe (2002), and Changó’s Beads and Two-Tone Shoes (2011). He has also authored plays and screenplays, and co-authored two children's books with his son, Brendan Kennedy.

Kennedy's use of Albany as the setting for eight of his novels was described in 2011 by book critic Jonathan Yardley as painting "a portrait of a single city perhaps unique in American fiction". Writer and Saul Bellow biographer James Atlas credits Kennedy with doing for Albany what James Joyce did for Dublin and Saul Bellow did for Chicago.

== Awards ==
He was named a 1983 MacArthur Fellow (more commonly known as receiving their "genius grant"). Kennedy received the 1984 Pulitzer Prize for Fiction for his novel Ironweed. He also won the National Book Critics Circle Award.

== Personal life ==
Kennedy met Dana (born Ana) Daisy Segarra, a Broadway dancer who went by the stage name Dana Sosa, in her native Puerto Rico. They married in 1957 and had three children. In 1963, they moved from Puerto Rico to Averill Park, New York, where she would die on September 29, 2023.

== Bibliography ==
=== Fiction ===
- The Ink Truck. New York: Viking Press, 1969.

==== The Albany Cycle ====
- Legs. New York: Coward, McCann & Geoghegan, 1975.
- Billy Phelan's Greatest Game. New York: Viking Press, 1978.
- Ironweed. New York: Viking Press, 1983.
- Quinn's Book. New York: Viking Press, 1988.
- Very Old Bones. New York: Viking Press, 1992.
- The Flaming Corsage. New York: Viking Press, 1996.
- Roscoe. New York: Viking Press, 2002.
- Changó's Beads and Two-Tone Shoes. New York: Viking Adult, 2012.

=== Nonfiction ===
- O Albany!: Improbable City of Political Wizards, Fearless Ethnics, Spectacular Aristocrats, Splendid Nobodies, and Underrated Scoundrels. New York: Viking Press, 1983.
- The Making of Ironweed. New York: Viking Penguin, 1988.
- Riding the Yellow Trolley Car. New York: Viking Press, 1993.

=== Screenplays ===
- The Cotton Club. Co-authored with Francis Ford Coppola. New York: St. Martin's Press, 1986.
- Ironweed. Tri-Star, 1987.

=== Plays ===
- Grand View. Premiered at Capital Repertory Theatre, Albany, New York, 1996.
- In the System. HumaniTech* Short Play Project Premiere, University at Albany, March 2003.
- The Light of the World. Premiere reading at Capital Repertory Theatre in Albany, starring Aidan Quinn. November 2014.

=== Children's books ===
- Charlie Malarkey and the Belly Button Machine (co-authored with Brendan Kennedy). New York: Atlantic Monthly Press, 1986.
- Charlie Malarkey and the Singing Moose (co-authored with Brendan Kennedy). New York: Viking Children's Books, 1994.

=== Criticism ===
- Flanagan, Thomas. O Albany!. New York Review of Books. April 25, 2002
- Giamo, Benedict F. The Homeless of Ironweed: Blossoms on the Crag. Iowa City: University of Iowa Press, 1997.
- Gillespie, Michael Patrick. Reading William Kennedy. Syracuse: Syracuse University Press.
- Lynch, Vivian Valvano. Portraits of Artists: Warriors in the Novels of William Kennedy. Bethesda: International Scholars Publications, 1999.
- Mallon, Thomas. William Kennedy's Greatest Game. The Atlantic Monthly. February 2002.
- Seshachari, Neila C. Courtesans, Stars, Wives, & Vixens: The Many Faces of Female Power in Kennedy's Novels, AWP Conference, Albany, NY. April 17, 1999.
- Marowski, Daniel G. and Matur, Roger, editors. "William Kennedy." Contemporary Literary Criticism, Vol. 53, Detroit: Gale Research, 1989, pp. 189–201.
- Michener, Christian. From Then into Now: William Kennedy's Albany Novels. University of Scranton Press, 1998.
- Reilly, Edward C. Twayne's United States Authors Series: William Kennedy. Boston: Twayne Publishers, 1991.
- Van Dover, J. K. Understanding William Kennedy. Columbia, SC: University of South Carolina Press, 1991.
- Seshachari, Neila C., editor. Conversations with William Kennedy. Jackson, MS: University Press of Mississippi, 1997.

== See also ==
- University at Albany – Famous Faculty
- John William Ward (professor)
