= Ist das Ihr Fahrrad, Mr. O'Brien? =

Ist das Ihr Fahrrad Mr O’Brien? (Is this your bicycle, Mr. O'Brien?) is a German biographical radio play about the life, works and legacy of Irish modernist writer Brian O'Nolan (Irish: Brian Ó Nualláin; 5 October 1911 – 1 April 1966).

cover of first edition 2003

== Plot summary ==
Irish novelist Brian O’Nolan uses numerous pseudonyms for his literary works. In this radio-drama, these pseudonyms meet and argue with characters from O’Nolan’s novels and narrations. The plot roughly follows O’Nolan’s real life as a student in Nazi-Germany, his return to inter-war Ireland, unemployment and career in the civil service, his declining health, dislike of James Joyce and constant financial troubles.

In the German original the drama was subtitled ‘’Eine Hörspielcollage aus der Welt der Wissenschaft und des Suffs’’ (A radio play patchwork from a world of science and booze), a claim that was brought to life by creative use of sound footage, music, audio-gags, and music by The Dubliners and other celtic folksingers.

== Literary sources and setting ==
The radio play draws from a number of novels, articles, and letters by O’Brien using German translations by Harry Rowohlt and original English texts alike. Rowohlt, an expert on O’Nolan and popular voice artist himself, was not included in the project by the producers.

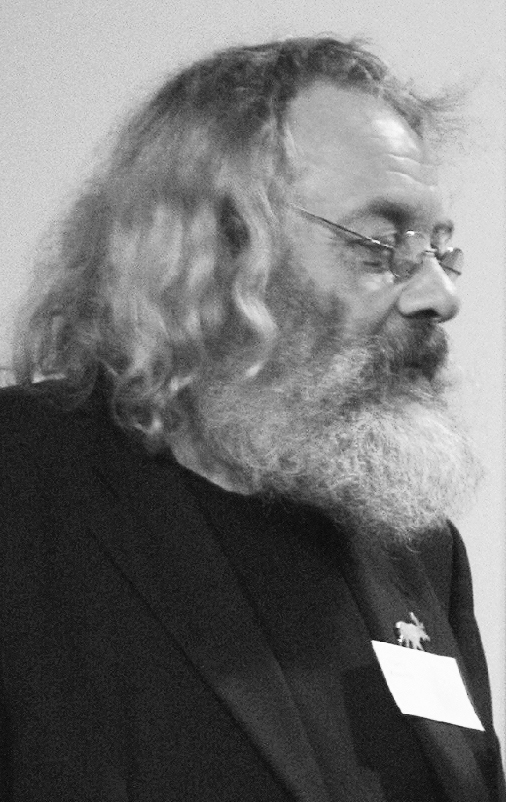
Translator Harry Rowohlt

- At Swim-Two-Birds
- The Third Policeman
- An Béal Bocht
- The Hard Life
- The Dalkey Archive
- ’’Cruiskeen Lawn’’

Accordingly, the play’s many settings include some of O’Nolans favorite places, namely Trinity College, Dublin; editorial offices of the Irish Times; a pub in pre-war Cologne; the Irish country-side; rural police stations, roads, barns, and stables.

== Characters and performers ==
- Narrator: Hüseyin Cirpici
- Flann O'Brien: Martin Engler
- 3rd Policeman: Udo Thies
- Professor De Selby: Ernst August Schepmann
- The plain people of Ireland: Peter Penewsky

In the play, a number of writers, historic, literary or public figures, and scientists are mentioned to illustrate O’Nolan’s colorful and over-populated universe, such as Marcel Proust, Oscar Wilde, Graham Greene, James Joyce, Fionn mac Cumhaill, Harry Rowohlt, Homer, Jonathan Swift, George Bernhard Shaw, the Marx Brothers, Brendan Behan, Éamon de Valera, Karl Kraus, Sherlock Holmes, and Erwin Schrödinger.

== Awards ==
Soon after the play was first aired, the first nominations for German radio awards were announced. Later that year it won the prestigious ‘Radio Play of the Month Award’ by the German National Academy of Performing Arts.

’’This radio-play about Irish writer Flann O’Brien is a refreshingly narrated, ironically twisted array of uberwell-known stereotypes about the Irish, like melancholy or heavy drinking. Endowed with brilliant humor, it brings to life the tragic side of O’Nolan’s existence, too.’’

- Hörspiel des Monats, Deutsche Akademie der Darstellenden Künste im September 2003.
- Nominated for the 2003 German RadioPlay Awards

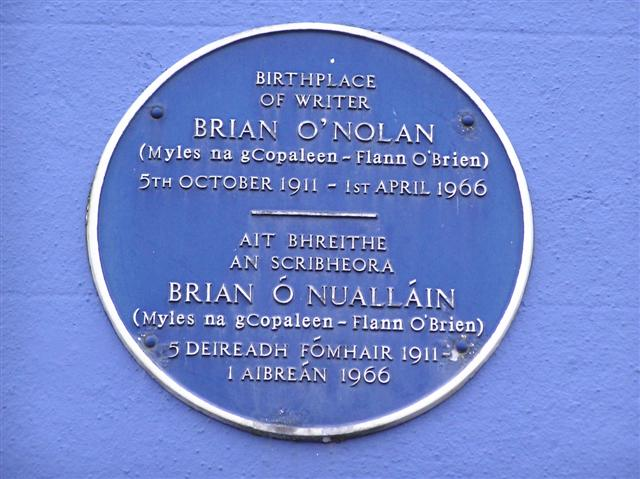
Plaque, Brian O'Nolan

== Current ownership ==
Since most radio shows and plays aired by German national broadcasting companies are not accessible online, current owner and sole distributor is the Saarländischer Rundfunk. The play has been regularly re-broadcast by federal Deutschlandfunk, and regional stations like Bayerischer Rundfunk, Norddeutscher Rundfunk and Suedwestrundfunk.

== See also ==
- Afterlife
- Catholicism
- Metafiction
- Irish literature

== Bibliography ==
- Cronin, Anthony (2003) [1989]. No Laughing Matter: The Life and Times of Flann O'Brien. Dublin: New Island Books. ISBN 1-904301-37-1. OCLC 52696949.
- Kenner, Hugh (1989) [1983]. A Colder Eye: The Modern Irish Writers. Baltimore: Johns Hopkins University Press. ISBN 0-8018-3838-X. OCLC 254475251.
- Levinson, Julie, “Adaptation, Metafiction, Self-Creation,” Genre: Forms of Discourse and Culture. Spring 2007, vol. 40: 1.
