= Timothy O'Keeffe =

Irish editor and publisher (1926–1994)

Timothy O'Keeffe (27 September 1926 – 11 January 1994) was an Irish-born editor and publisher. He was born in Scilly, Kinsale, County Cork, and served as editorial director of the London publishing house MacGibbon & Kee. He later formed his own publishing house, Martin, Brian & O'Keeffe.

O'Keeffe was instrumental in the republication of Flann O'Brien's novel At Swim-Two-Birds in 1959, as well as the posthumous publication of O'Brien's The Third Policeman in 1967; had it not been for O'Keeffe's determined efforts, the books would largely be unknown today. The Review of Contemporary Fiction has hailed O'Keeffe as "among the most important publishing editors of the century."

He died in London in 1994, aged 67. His former colleague, Martin Green, writing in The Independent, said that his death "closes a chapter on the London publishing scene."
