= Rowohlt =

Rowohlt may refer to:

- Rowohlt Verlag, a publishing house
- Ernst Rowohlt, publisher
- Harry Rowohlt, writer
- Maria Rowohlt, actress
