= An Béal Bocht =

1941 Irish novel by Brian O'Nolan (better known as Flann O'Brien)

- Cover of the first edition
- Author: Myles na gCopaleen
- Original title: An Béal Bocht
- Translator: Patrick C. Power
- Language: Irish
- Genre: Satire, Parody
- Publisher: An Preas Náisiúnta
- Publication date: 1941
- Publication place: Ireland
- English publication date: 1973
- Media type: Print ()
- Pages: 114
- ISBN: 0-85342-794-1
- OCLC: 31272718
- Preceded by: The Third Policeman
- Followed by: The Hard Life

An Béal Bocht (The Poor Mouth) is a 1941 novel in Irish by Brian O'Nolan (better known by his pen name Flann O'Brien), published under the pseudonym "Myles na gCopaleen". It is regarded as one of the most important Irish-language novels of the 20th century. An English translation by Patrick C. Power appeared in 1973. Stan Gebler Davies wrote: "The Poor Mouth is wildly funny, but there is at the same time always a sense of black evil. Only O'Brien's genius, of all the writers I can think of, was capable of that mixture of qualities."

== Background ==
The book is a kindly parody of the genre of Gaeltacht autobiographies, such as Tomás Ó Criomhthain's autobiography An t-Oileánach (The Islandman), or Peig Sayers' autobiography Peig, which recounts her life, especially the latter half, as a series of misfortunes in which much of her family die by disease, drowning or other mishap. Books of this genre were part of the Irish-language syllabus in the Irish school system and so were mandatory reading for generations of children from independence in 1921. O'Nolan was in fact a great admirer of An t-Oileánach, which is widely regarded as the greatest work of the genre. Critic Declan Kiberd has noted that O'Nolan tended to express admiration for a writer by parodying the writer's work.

The Irish expression "to put on the poor mouth" (Irish: an béal bocht a chur ort) is mildly pejorative and refers to the practice, often associated with peasant farmers, of exaggerating the direness of one's situation, particularly financially, to evoke sympathy, charity and perhaps the forbearance of creditors and landlords or generosity of customers. The title may also be a parody of that of the Irish-language reader An Saol Mór (The Great Life) (béal and saol are near-rhymes) or An Béal Beo (The Living Tongue) by Tomas Ó Máille, published by An Gúm in 1936.

One of the book's recurring figures of speech in is the line from Ó Criomhthain's An t-Oileánach, ...mar ná beidh ár leithéidí arís ann ("for our likes will not be (seen) again"); variations of it appear throughout An Béal Bocht.

All of O'Nolan's other novels were published under the pseudonym Flann O'Brien; this is the only one he wrote as Myles na gCopaleen, the name he was using for his Irish Times column Cruiskeen Lawn. (O'Nolan later altered the newspaper byline slightly to the more anglicised "Myles na Gopaleen".) Neither is a real Irish surname; both derive from the character Myles-na-Coppaleen in Dion Boucicault's 1860 play The Colleen Bawn, which, in turn, comes from the Irish na gcapaillín, "of the little horses". Confusingly, the English translation of An Béal Bocht is published as the work of "Flann O'Brien".

== Plot ==
An Béal Bocht is set in Corca Dhorcha, (Corkadoragha, Corkadorkey) (a parody of Irish: Corca Dhuibhne, the name for the Dingle Peninsula), a remote region of Western Ireland where it never stops raining and everyone lives in desperate poverty (and always will) while talking in "the learned smooth Gaelic". It is a memoir of one Bónapárt Ó Cúnasa (Bonaparte O'Coonassa), a resident of this region, beginning at his very birth. At one point the area is visited by hordes of Gaeilgeoirí (Irish-language lovers) from Dublin, who say that not only should one always speak Irish, but also every sentence one utters in Irish should be about the language question. They eventually abandon the area because it is too impoverished and too culturally authentic, and because the dialect spoken in Corca Dhorcha is far too Irish. After a series of bloodcurdling and horrible adventures, the narrator is imprisoned on a false murder charge, and there, "safe in jail and free from the miseries of life", has the chance to write this most affecting memoir of our times.

== Adaptations ==
An adaptation of An Béal Bocht by Sean A O'Briain was performed for the first time in the Damer Theatre, Dublin, on 31 January 1967 by An Cumann Gaelach from University College Dublin. It was also part of The University Drama Festival in Galway in February 1967. On 26 July 1967 the play opened in The Peacock Theatre, Dublin, as the theatre's first production. It ran for three days and closed abruptly. Due to a disagreement between Brian O'Nualain's widow and the book publishers The Abbey Theatre decided to pull the play.

The book was adapted for stage by Paul Lee and first presented in the pub An Béal Bocht, Charlemont Street, Dublin, for the Dublin Theatre Festival in 1989, directed by Ronan Smith.

Irish filmmaker Tom Collins adapted and directed an animated version of the book, which was first shown (outside of festivals) on TG4 on Christmas Day 2017 and features the voices of Owen McDonnell and Donncha Crowley. The artwork is by John McCloskey, whose graphic novel adaptation based on Collins' screenplay was published in 2012 by Cló Mhaigh Eo.
