= Dalkey Archive =

Dalkey Archive may refer to:

- The Dalkey Archive, 1964 novel by Irish writer Flann O'Brien
- Dalkey Archive Press, American publisher of fiction, poetry, and literary criticism
