= Janetta Parladé =

British socialite and artist (1921-2018)

- Born: Janet E. Woolley; December 31, 1921
- Died: June 9, 2018 (aged 96); London, UK
- Children: 3

Janetta Parladé (born Janet E. Woolley; London, 31 December 1921–London, 9 June 2018) was a British socialite, painter and aristocrat.

Woolley was profiled in DJ Taylor's 2019 book Lost Girls: Love, War and Literature 1939-1951.

== Family origins ==
Her parents were Geoffrey Harold Woolley, VC, OBE, MC (1892 - 1968) and Janet Beatrix Orr-Ewing. Her brother was Harold Lindsay Cathcart “Rollo” Woolley (1919-1942), Flying Officer of the RAF during World War II and killed in action over Tunisia.

== Life ==
Woolley was pulled from school at age 14 by her mother, and the two moved to Torremolinos, Spain by the mid-1930s. Her mother was an acquaintance of Gerald Brenan and Gamel Woolsey, who were connected with the Bloomsbury Group. There, Woolley met Ralph and Frances Partridge, who became like parents to her. With the outbreak of the Spanish Civil War, Woolsey, then 17, and her mother returned to England. As a teenager, Woolley became pregnant and underwent an abortion.

Woolley was a member of the circle of clerks and secretaries of Horizon: A Review of Literature and Art, founded and edited by Cyril Connolly during the World War II. There, she earned the nickname 'Miss Bluefeet', as she tended to walk around barefoot in the magazine's office. She also worked in a munitions factory during the war. In 1949, she and David Astor served as the witnesses for the marriage of Sonia Brownell and George Orwell.

In the 1950s, Woolley and her then-husband, Derek Jackson, rented homes in both Ireland and France.

In the 1960s she moved to Spain. There, along her partner and future husband, the decorator and third Marquis of Apezteguía, Jaime Parladé, she built Tramores, a house built about a ruined Moorish tower in a high valley of the Sierra de Ronda with gardens full of and fruit trees and exotic plants. The two later sold the house and moved to Alcuzcuz, near Ronda, where the couple lived for the remainder of their lives. Woolley died in Marbella on 9 June 2018.

== Personal life ==
She married four times: to Humphrey Slater (1940-42), Robert Kee (1948-1951), Derek Jackson (1952-1955), and Jaime Parladé (1971-2015). She also had relationships with Kenneth Sinclair-Loutit, Lucian Freud, Ivan Moffat, Jonathan Gathorne-Hardy, Arthur Koestler, Alfred J. Ayer, Andrew Cavendish, 11th Duke of Devonshire, among others.

Woolley had three daughters. Her first daughter, Nicolette, was born during her relationship with Spanish Civil War veteran Kenneth Sinclair-Loutit, following the dissolution of her marriage to Humphrey Slater. Her second daughter, Georgiana, was born following Woolley's marriage to Robert Kee. Her third daughter, Rose, was born during her marriage with Derek Jackson. On the day of Rose's birth, Jackson eloped with Woolley's half sister, Angela Culme-Seymour.

== Character and personality ==
Patrick Leigh Fermor said about her: “Janetta has a marvellous fine-boned beauty… there is something magical and quiet about her”. “She was beautiful, and in her quiet manner she had an immense presence…”, Sinclair-Loutit recalled. “Sad, grave, gem-like beauty and happiness soon to be thrown away…”, Connolly confessed in The unquiet grave. The baron, critic and philanthropist George Weidenfeld remembers her in his memoirs as “a wayward beauty who had been the Egeria to many remarkable men, some of whom she wed”. “A mysterious elusive woman… femme fatale (I suppose she must count as that, though I don’t think husbands or lovers ever bore her any grudge)”, said the poet Stephen Spender. As Frances Partridge summarizes: "She is as she is — someone exceptional, unique".
