= The Hard Life =

Comic novel by Flann O'Brien

The Hard Life: An Exegesis of Squalor
- First edition
- Author: Flann O'Brien
- Language: English
- Genre: Comic novel
- Publisher: MacGibbon & Kee
- Publication date: 1961
- Publication place: Ireland
- Media type: Print (Hardcover & Paperback)
- Pages: 157 pp.

The Hard Life: An Exegesis of Squalor is a comic novel by Flann O'Brien (pen name of Brian O'Nolan). Published in 1961, it was O'Brien's fourth novel and the third to be published. (He wrote The Third Policeman in 1939, but it was published only posthumously, in 1967.) Set in turn-of-the-century Dublin, The Hard Life is a satirical Bildungsroman that deals with the education and upbringing of the narrator, Finbarr, and his brother Manus. The novel offers a mocking critique of certain representatives of the Roman Catholic Church, the development of Irish identity and the functioning of formal education. The novel was initially very popular, with its first print run selling out within forty-eight hours, and it has been republished several times in Ireland, Britain and the United States, both as a stand-alone work and, most recently, in Flann O'Brien: The Complete Novels (Everyman's Library, 2007).

== Plot summary ==
The story opens with the narrator, Finbarr, recalling the death of his mother in 1890, when he was around five years old. He and his brother Manus (often referred to simply as "the brother") are raised in the home of their half-uncle, Mr Collopy. Collopy lives with his partner Mrs Crotty – it is unclear if they are married and the narrator can only speculate as to why she retained the name of her first husband – and Annie, Collopy's daughter from an earlier marriage. Finbarr describes Collopy's home as a squalid environment where the boys are served greasy meatballs for dinner, a household with a "dead atmosphere" offering little opportunity for amusement. Collopy and the parish priest, a German Jesuit domiciled in Dublin and bearing the comical name of Father Fahrt, frequently indulge in long bouts of drinking, and none of the adults exhibits much concern for the child's welfare.

Finbarr attends Synge Street Christian Brothers School, the former school of O'Brien/O'Nolan himself, while Manus attends Westland Row Christian Brothers School. Both schools are run by the Catholic Christian Brothers, both boys detest their schools with equal passion, and O'Brien mocks both with equal contempt. Finbarr's first impression of his school is that it resembles a prison: he describes the horrors of corporal punishment by "the leather" in detail, and refers to "struggling through the wretched homework, cursing Wordsworth and Euclid and Christian doctrine and similar scourges of youth".

Manus is both resourceful and deceitful, and while still at school he comes up with a cunning idea to raise money. He offers distance-learning courses for a small fee on a wide variety of subjects about which he knows very little. He researches information on these subjects in the local library and re-hashes the prose of encyclopedias, writing in a pseudo-intellectual, abstruse style deliberately designed to look impressive but remain incomprehensible. This business proves extremely successful, and eventually he leaves school and emigrates to London, where he offers a wider range of courses and also develops medicinal remedies to sell.

Meanwhile, Mr Collopy is dedicating his time to the pursuit of a certain social or political cause, but never states the nature of this cause directly. Early in the novel it appears that the issue holds considerable gravity: it seems to concern women's rights, and Collopy is rallying the Dublin Corporation to implement some kind of change and trying to persuade Father Fahrt to secure the support of the church. However, later in the novel it becomes clear that the issue in question is the establishment of public lavatories in Dublin and that, while Collopy is campaigning for this goal, he is just as prudish as the Dublin authorities he is fighting against, because he will mention the issue only through euphemisms or circumlocutions.

When Collopy falls ill Manus sends Finbarr one of his potions, "Gravid Water", to help him. However, Finbarr administers the wrong dosage, which causes rapid weight gain and eventually leads to Collopy's death. Manus also devises a scheme to get Collopy and Father Fahrt an audience with Pope Pius X, so that Collopy can win papal support for the lavatory campaign. However, Manus is aware that the Pope will have little time for Collopy and Fahrt, and enjoys the spectacle of their humiliation, as the angry Pope, in a mixture of Latin and Italian, quite literally sends them to Hell. The novel closes with Finbarr vomiting out of a feeling of disgust at his brother's lack of morals, and at the squalid and hypocritical world he lives in.

The novel opens in 1890 and the date on Collopy's gravestone is 1904, so the events in the novel should span fourteen years. Finbarr is still at school when Collopy dies, making him likely in his last year of school (which he decides not to finish) at age eighteen.

== Major themes ==
The Hard Life is pervaded by an atmosphere of squalor and despair. The Dublin that the boys inhabit is a decaying city and they are brought up in a broken family. Much of the satirical humour of the book targets the Catholic Church in Ireland and parochial schools: the theological disputes between Father Fahrt and Collopy are ridiculed, and often even the boys correct their misunderstandings. However, as Anne Clissmann has pointed out, O'Brien remained a faithful Catholic throughout his life and his lampoons can be read as being aimed at particular individuals and practices, rather than against the Church as a whole.

The book also pokes fun at education and how gullible people can be deceived by flowery prose. Manus is easily able to deceive the public when he sells pamphlets on diverse subjects, despite relying on repackaging information from library books. While Manus's scheme initially seems clever and attractive to the narrator, after Collopy's death he realises its moral bankruptcy and rejects it.

== Literary significance and reception ==
The first print run of The Hard Life sold out in Dublin in less than forty-eight hours, and initial reviews were very positive. Graham Greene, to whom the novel is dedicated, responded warmly to the dedication, and reviewers such as Maurice Edelman and Anthony Burgess compared the novel, favourably, to the works of James Joyce. Other newspaper reviews praised the work for its "first-rate dialogue", its "wild, hilarious, irreverent comedy" and its "glorious version of the English language".

However, many recent critical studies of the novel have suggested that it is the weakest of O'Brien's novels. Keith Donohue (2007) writes that, "in terms of sheer artistry, the novel is far more conservative" than O'Brien's early work and considers O'Brien's choice of themes "oddly oblique", given that (in his opinion) the prudish Catholicism that O'Brien was targeting was waning by the early 1960s anyway. Sue Asbee (1991) comments that "it is unlikely that the work would remain in print today" if it were not for the strength of O'Brien's other novels. Anne Clissmann (1975) suggests that the "lavatory humour" of the novel quickly loses its appeal and concludes that "The Hard Life is ultimately unsatisfying to read because it lacks coherence and is too one-sided a vision of squalid reality."

=== References to other works ===
The Bildungsroman genre typically deals with a protagonist coming of age, and experiencing the joys and sorrows of growing up: education, finding a job, finding a partner. The Hard Life clearly mocks this tradition: Finbarr and Manus grow up in a squalid society that has little to offer them. Manus makes money and wins friends, but only by deception, and although the novel's conclusion shows Finbarr rejecting this path, it is uncertain how his future will develop.

The Hard Life is often compared to the prose of James Joyce, particularly his collection of short stories Dubliners. Sue Asbee suggests that such a comparison is "almost insulting" to Joyce, but accepts that both deal with the squalor of turn-of-the-century Dublin, alcoholism and the power of the Catholic Church. She notes that The Hard Life, like most of the stories in Dubliners, ends with a moment of enlightenment for the protagonist but without resolution of the problems. It is also noteworthy that the narrator falls in love with a girl called Penelope and compares her with the character of this name in Greek mythology, perhaps recalling Joyce's Ulysses.

Anne Clissmann points out that the device of using language pedantically as a source of humour has much in common with O'Brien's other novels, especially The Dalkey Archive, although, in her view, The Hard Life is less successful because it "gives the impression of trying to be too funny, too pedantic". Donoghue suggests that The Hard Life has more in common with O'Brien's journalism, written under the pen-name Myles na gCopaleen, than with his other novels.

=== References to history and geography ===
The novel is set amid the rise of Irish nationalism, the Gaelic revival, and increased calls for home rule and Irish independence. Nationalist feeling does not feature prominently in the novel, but Collopy does comment on the rise of the Home Rule movement and remarks with pleasure that he sees young men playing "native games" rather than "this new golf", which "for pity's sake isn't a game at all". By placing these words in the mouth of one of his limited comic characters, Collopy, O'Brien is lightly mocking Irish identity by showing how it is based on anti-British sentiment as much as a positive affirmation of Irishness.

A number of real Dublin locations are mentioned in the novel. Collopy lives at Warrington Place, an extension of Herbert Place. As noted above, the two schools alluded to in the novel are real: Synge Street Christian Brothers Schools and Westland Row Christian Brothers School. The Dublin Corporation, which rejects Collopy's plans for the installation of women's lavatories, was a historical body of city government which has now been renamed Dublin City Council.

The closing chapters describe real locations in Rome and the Vatican. Manus buries Collopy in Rome at the Campo Verano cemetery and claims that the inscription he places on the headstone is an ironic joke on Keats' headstone. According to the novel, Keats' headstone reads "Here lies one whose name was writ on water" and Collopy's "Here lies one whose name was writ in water" (p. 602). The joke here refers to Collopy's devotion to lavatories: Collopy wished to have his name written on the walls of the lavatories. However, either Manus or O'Brien himself is mistaken: Keats' headstone itself reads "Here lies one whose name was writ in water", a self-lacerating reference to the negative reviews that his poetry received.

== Publication history ==
Details of the first edition: 1961, Dublin, Ireland: MacGibbon and Kee. ISBN 0-261-61637-4, Pub. date 1 December 1961, Hardback.

The first American edition was published in 1962 by Pantheon Books.

There have been numerous editions by publishers based in Britain, Ireland and the United States since 1962. Most recently The Hard Life has been included in Flann O'Brien: The Complete Novels, New York, Toronto and London: Everyman's Library, 2007. ISBN 978-0-307-26749-8. Hardback.

At least one critic has posited that O'Brien was hoping that The Hard Life would be banned under the Censorship of Publications Act because this would arouse curiosity about the book, and probably lead to increased publicity and sales. Censorship would also have given him the opportunity to enter into a legal battle against the government, with the possibility of further publicity.
