= At Swim-Two-Birds =

1939 novel by Brian O'Nolan

- First edition cover
- Author: Flann O'Brien
- Language: English
- Publisher: Longman Green & Co
- Publication date: 1939
- Publication place: Ireland
- Media type: Print (hard & paperback)
- Pages: 224 pp (UK paperback edition)
- Followed by: The Third Policeman

At Swim-Two-Birds is a 1939 novel by Irish writer Brian O'Nolan, writing under the pseudonym Flann O'Brien. It is widely considered to be O'Brien's masterpiece, and one of the most sophisticated examples of metafiction.

The novel's title derives from Snám dá Én (Middle Irish: "The narrow water of the two birds"; Modern Irish: Snámh Dá Éan), an ancient ford on the River Shannon, between Clonmacnoise and Shannonbridge, reportedly visited by the legendary King Sweeney, a character in the novel.

The novel was included in Time magazine's list of the 100 best English-language novels from 1923 to 2005. It was also included in a list, published by The Guardian, of the 100 best English-language novels of all time.

== Plot summary ==
At Swim-Two-Birds presents itself as a first-person story by an unnamed Irish student of literature. The student believes that "one beginning and one ending for a book was a thing I did not agree with", and he accordingly sets three apparently quite separate stories in motion. The first concerns the Pooka MacPhellimey, "a member of the devil class". The second is about a young man named John Furriskey, who turns out to be a fictional character created by another of the student's creations, Dermot Trellis, a cynical writer of Westerns. The third consists of the student's adaptations of Irish legends, mostly concerning Finn Mac Cool and Mad King Sweeney. But even this is a jest — the first of many in the novel — as there is actually a fourth beginning: the Irish student's own discourse on the benefits of three beginnings, setting his own story in motion.

In the autobiographical frame story, the student recounts details of his life. He lives with his uncle, who works as a clerk in the Guinness Brewery in Dublin. The uncle is a complacent and self-consciously respectable bachelor who suspects that the student does very little studying. This seems to be the case, as by his own account the student spends more time drinking stout with his college friends, lying in bed, and working on his book than he does going to class.

The stories that the student is writing soon become intertwined with each other. John Furriskey meets and befriends two of Trellis's other characters, Antony Lamont and Paul Shanahan. They each become resentful of Trellis's control over their destinies, and manage to drug him so that he will spend more time asleep, giving them the freedom to lead quiet domestic lives rather than be ruled by the lurid plots of his novels. Meanwhile, Trellis creates Sheila Lamont (Antony Lamont's sister) in order that Furriskey might seduce and betray her, but "blinded by her beauty" Trellis "so far forgets himself as to assault her himself." Sheila, in due course, gives birth to a child named Orlick, who is born as a polite and articulate young man with a gift for writing fiction. The entire group of Trellis's characters, by now including Finn, Sweeney, the urbane Pooka and an invisible and quarrelsome Good Fairy who lives in the Pooka's pocket, convenes in Trellis's fictional Red Swan Hotel where they devise a way to overthrow their author. Encouraged by the others, Orlick starts writing a novel about his father in which Trellis is tried by his own creations, found guilty and viciously tortured. Just as Orlick's novel is about to climax with Trellis' death, the college student passes his exams and reconciles with his uncle. He completes his story by having Trellis's maid accidentally burn the papers sustaining the existence of Furriskey and his friends, freeing Trellis.

== Genesis and composition ==
The idea of interaction between the author and his characters is not new, and one earlier example is Miguel de Unamuno's 1914 novel Niebla. An even earlier example is A Sensation Novel (1871), a comic musical play in three acts written by W. S. Gilbert before he began collaborating with Arthur Sullivan. A Sensation Novel concerns an author suffering from writer's block who finds that the characters in his novel are dissatisfied. O’Nolan first explored the idea of fictional characters rebelling against their creator in a short story titled "Scenes in a Novel", published in the UCD literary magazine Comhthrom Féinne (Ir., "Fair Play") in 1934. The story was a first-person narrative ostensibly written by a novelist called Brother Barnabas, whose characters become tired of doing his bidding and who eventually conspire to murder him:

The book is seething with conspiracy and there have been at least two whispered consultations between all the characters, including two who have not yet been officially created. ... Candidly, reader, I fear my number's up.

The mythological content of At Swim was inspired by O'Nolan's affection for early Irish literature. He grew up in an Irish-speaking home and although he claimed in later life that he had attended few of his college lectures, he studied the late medieval Irish literary tradition as part of the syllabus and acquired enough Old Irish to be able to compose in the language with reasonable fluency. His M.A. thesis was entitled "Nature Poetry in Irish" (Nádúirfhilíocht na Gaedhilge), although his examiner Agnes O'Farrelly rejected the initial draft and he was obliged to rewrite it. At Swim-Two-Birds contains references to no less than fourteen sources in early and medieval Irish literature. Most of the poetry recited by King Sweeney was taken directly from the Middle Irish romance Buile Suibhne, O'Nolan slightly modifying the translations for comic effect. For example, the original "an clog náomh re náomhaibh", translated by J. G. O'Keeffe in the standard edition as "the bell of saints before saints", is rendered by O'Nolan as "the saint-bell of saints with sainty-saints".

At Swim-Two-Birds has been classified as a Menippean satire. O'Nolan was exposed to the Menippean tradition through the modern literature he is known to have admired, including works by James Joyce, Aldous Huxley, Søren Kierkegaard and James Branch Cabell, but he may also have encountered it in the course of his study of medieval Irish literature; the Middle Irish satire Aislinge Meic Con Glinne has been described as "the best major work of parody in the Irish language".

O'Nolan composed the novel on an Underwood portable typewriter in the bedroom he shared with his younger brother Micheál. The typewriter rested on a table constructed by O'Nolan from the offcuts of a modified trellis that had stood in the O'Nolan family's back garden. O'Nolan's biographer believes that it was the unusual material that the writing table was made of that inspired the name of the character "Dermot Trellis", although there is no reference to where this information was found.

O'Nolan used various found texts in the novel; a letter from a horseracing tipster was given to him by a college friend, while the painter Cecil Salkeld gave O'Nolan the original "Conspectus of the Arts and Sciences". Before submitting the manuscript for publication O'Nolan gave it to friends to read. A friend wrote him a letter which included suggestions about how to end the novel and O'Nolan incorporated the salient part of the letter into the text itself, although he later cut it. The sudden death in 1937 of O'Nolan's father Michael O'Nolan may have influenced the episode in which the student narrator regrets his unkind thoughts about his previously despised uncle.

== Publication history ==
At Swim-Two-Birds was accepted for publication by Longman's on the recommendation of Graham Greene, who was a reader for them at the time. It was published under the pseudonym of Flann O'Brien, a name O'Nolan had already used to write hoax letters to the Irish Times. O'Nolan had suggested using "Flann O'Brien" as a pen-name during negotiation with Longman's:

I have been thinking over the question of a pen-name and would suggest Flann O'Brien. I think this invention has the advantage that it contains an unusual name and one that is quite ordinary. "Flann" is an old Irish name now rarely heard.

The book was published on 13 March 1939, but did not sell well: by the outbreak of World War II it had sold scarcely more than 240 copies. In 1940, Longman's London premises were destroyed during a bombing raid by the Luftwaffe and almost all the unsold copies were incinerated. The novel was republished by Pantheon Books in New York City in 1950, on the recommendation of James Johnson Sweeney, but sales remained low. In May 1959 Timothy O'Keeffe, while editorial director of the London publishing house MacGibbon & Kee, persuaded O'Nolan to allow him to republish At Swim-Two-Birds. More recently, the novel was republished in the United States by Dalkey Archive Press.

== Literary significance and criticism ==
The initial reviews for At Swim-Two-Birds were not enthusiastic. The Times Literary Supplement said that the book's only notable feature was a "schoolboy brand of mild vulgarity"; the New Statesman complained that "long passages in imitation of the Joycean parody of the early Irish epic are devastatingly dull" and the Irish novelist Seán Ó Faoláin commented in John O'London's Weekly that although the book had its moments, it "had a general odour of spilt Joyce all over it."

However, most of the support for At Swim-Two-Birds came not from newspaper reviewers but from writers. Dylan Thomas, in a remark that would be quoted on dust-jackets in later editions of the book, said "This is just the book to give your sister – if she's a loud, dirty, boozy girl". Anthony Burgess considered it one of the ninety-nine greatest novels written between 1939 and 1984. Graham Greene's enthusiastic reader's report was instrumental in getting the book published in the first place:

It is in the line of Tristram Shandy and Ulysses: its amazing spirits do not disguise the seriousness of the attempt to present, simultaneously as it were, all the literary traditions of Ireland. ... We have had books inside books before now, and characters who are given life outside their fiction, but O'Nolan takes Pirandello and Gide a long way further.

O'Nolan's friend Niall Sheridan gave James Joyce an inscribed copy of the book. Joyce declared it the work of a "real writer" who had "the true comic spirit" and attempted to get the book reviewed in French periodicals, although without success. It is thought to have been the last novel Joyce ever read. Anthony Cronin has written of the effect the novel had on him as a seventeen-year-old in 1940s Dublin, praising its "umistakable sheen of the avant-garde", describing it "breathtakingly funny" and noting "the deadly accuracy of the ear for lower middle class Dublin speech". Most academic criticism of the book has sought to appropriate it one way or the other; critics like Bernard Benstock, who argued that O'Brien's embrace of myth and refusal of realism "ensnare[d] him with the second rank", have been in the minority. Vivian Mercier described it in The Irish Comic Tradition as "the most fantastic novel written by an Irishman in the twentieth century – with the doubtful exception of Finnegans Wake." Rüdiger Imhof has noted how works by B. S. Johnson, Gilbert Sorrentino, Alasdair Gray and John Fowles carry explicit references to At Swim-Two-Birds. Michael Cronin draws attention to the metafictional and game-playing elements of the book, comparing it to the fictions of Raymond Queneau, and responds to criticism that the book is insufficiently respectful of realist conventions:

Contrary to what Benstock argues, what post-independence Ireland needed was not less but more of the type of playful, self-aware writing being proposed by Flann O'Brien in At Swim-Two-Birds. ... We would all be very much poorer without Mad O'Brien's narrative chessmen.

Keith Hopper has argued that, contrary to the common tendency to favour At Swim-Two-Birds as "the primary defining text of the O'Brien oeuvre", the novel is in fact less, not more, experimental than O'Brien's second novel, the posthumously published The Third Policeman:

At Swim-Two-Birds is best considered as a late-modernist, transitional text which critiques both realism and modernism in an openly deconstructive manner, and in the process comes to the brink of an exciting new aesthetic. I will argue that the metafictional techniques developed publicly in [the book] ... are imbricated and embedded within the texture of The Third Policeman.

In a long essay published in 2000, Declan Kiberd analysed At Swim-Two-Birds from a postcolonial perspective, seeing it as a complex imaginative response to the economic and social stagnation of 1930s Ireland and arguing that the fragmented and polyphonic texture of the book is the work of an author who is "less anxious to say something new than to find a self that is capable of saying anything at all." Kiberd suggests that the one element of the book which is not seriously ironised or satirised is Sweeney's poetry, and that this is related to O'Nolan's genuine if complex respect for Irish-language literature:

What saved O'Brien from lapsing into postmodern nihilism was not his Catholicism which held that the world was a doomed and hopeless place, but his respect for the prose of An tOileánach or the poetry of Buile Suibhne, where language still did its appointed work. ... He was an experimentalist who was way ahead of his time: only after his death did his readers learn how to become his contemporaries.

In a 1939 essay titled When Fiction Lives in Fiction, Argentine writer Jorge Luis Borges described Flann O'Brien's masterpiece as follows,

I have enumerated many verbal labyrinths, but none so complex as the recent book by Flann O'Brien, At Swim-Two-Birds. A student in Dublin writes a novel about the proprietor of a Dublin public house, who writes a novel about the habitués of his pub (among them, the student), who in their turn write novels in which proprietor and student figure along with other writers about other novelists. The book consists of the extremely diverse manuscripts of these real or imagined persons, copiously annotated by the student. At Swim-Two-Birds is not only a labyrinth; it is a discussion of the many ways to conceive of the Irish novel and a repertory of exercises in prose and verse which illustrate or parody all the styles of Ireland. The magisterial influence of Joyce (also an architect of labyrinths, also a literary Proteus) is undeniable, but not disproportionate in this manifold book. Arthur Schopenhauer wrote that dreaming and wakefulness are the pages of a single book, and that to read them in order is to live, and to leaf through them at random, is to dream. Paintings within paintings and books that branch into other books help us sense this oneness.

In 2011, the book was placed on Time magazine's top 100 fiction books written in English since 1923.

== Translations ==
At Swim-Two-Birds has been translated into several languages, including French, German, Italian, Spanish, Dutch, Polish, Hungarian, Swedish, Romanian and Bulgarian. The first French translation, Kermesse irlandaise, was written by Henri Morisset and published in 1964; another, Swim-Two-Birds, was published in 2002. The Spanish translation, En Nadar-dos-pájaros, was published in 1989 by Edhasa. The Dutch translation Tegengif was made by Bob den Uyl and first published by Meulenhoff in 1974. It was published again in 2010 by Atlas as Op Twee-Vogel-Wad. The book has been translated into German twice, once in 1966 by Lore Fiedler and subsequently in 2005 by Harry Rowohlt. The book has also been adapted as a German-language film by Austrian director Kurt Palm. The Romanian version is by Adrian Oțoiu and was published in 2005, as 'La Doi Lebădoi'. The Bulgarian translation "Plavashtite Chavki" by Filipina Filipova was published in 2008 by www.famapublishers.com.

== Into other media ==
=== Film ===
The Austrian director Kurt Palm made a film from the book in 1997. The title of the film is In Schwimmen-zwei-Vögel.

Actor Brendan Gleeson has long planned to make his directorial debut in a movie adaptation of the book. The Irish production company Parallel Pictures announced that it would produce the film with a budget of $11 million. Michael Fassbender, Colin Farrell, Gabriel Byrne, Jonathan Rhys Meyers and Cillian Murphy have at various times been attached to star in the film. Gleeson confirmed in July 2011 that he had secured funding for the project. He described the writing of the script as torturous and that it had taken 14 drafts so far. As of April 2014, the film was still in development.

=== Stage ===
The book has been adapted for the stage on at least four occasions. The first stage version was commissioned in 1971 by the Abbey Theatre in Dublin and written by Audrey Welsh. The British theatre company Ridiculusmus toured a three-man adaptation of it in 1994–1995 and there was a 1998 version by Alex Johnston for the Abbey Theatre. A more recent stage version was directed by Niall Henry and performed by the Blue Raincoat Theatre Company in Sligo in November 2009.

=== Radio ===
The novel was adapted for radio by Eric Ewens and broadcast on BBC Radio 3 on 26 August 1979, repeated 2 November 1980. The director was Ronald Mason.

== Epigraph ==
The Greek phrase found in the front-matter of the novel (Ancient Greek: ἐξίσταται γὰρ πάντ' ἀπ' ἀλλήλων δίχα, romanized: existatai gar pant' ap' allêlôn dikha, lit. 'for all things change, making way for each other') is from Euripides's Herakles. This may be construed as a consolation: "No matter how bad you feel, don't lose hope, because you can count on things getting better."
