= James MacGibbon =

Scottish publisher (1912–2000)

James MacGibbon (18 February 1912 – 29 February 2000) was a Scottish publisher, who co-founded the publishing house of MacGibbon & Kee, with Robert Kee, in 1948.

He was born in Glasgow, Scotland, the youngest son of Rev. James MacGibbon MC DD (1865–1922), minister of Glasgow Cathedral. He was educated at Fettes College.

James was commissioned as a second lieutenant at the outbreak of World War 2 and was posted to the Intelligence Corps due to his fluency in German. In spring 1941, he was posted to the War Office in MO3 (Military Operations, Section 3). In June 1944, he was posted to the Combined Chiefs of Staff in Washington.

At his deathbed, he admitted in a 12-page affidavit that he had spied for the Soviet Union during the war, passing on information about German troop deployments and information about Operation Overlord to the Soviets before the Tehran Conference in 1943. He potentially used the cover names "Dolly" and "Milord" when spying during the war.
