= Robert Kee =

British broadcaster, journalist and writer (1919–2013)

Robert Kee CBE
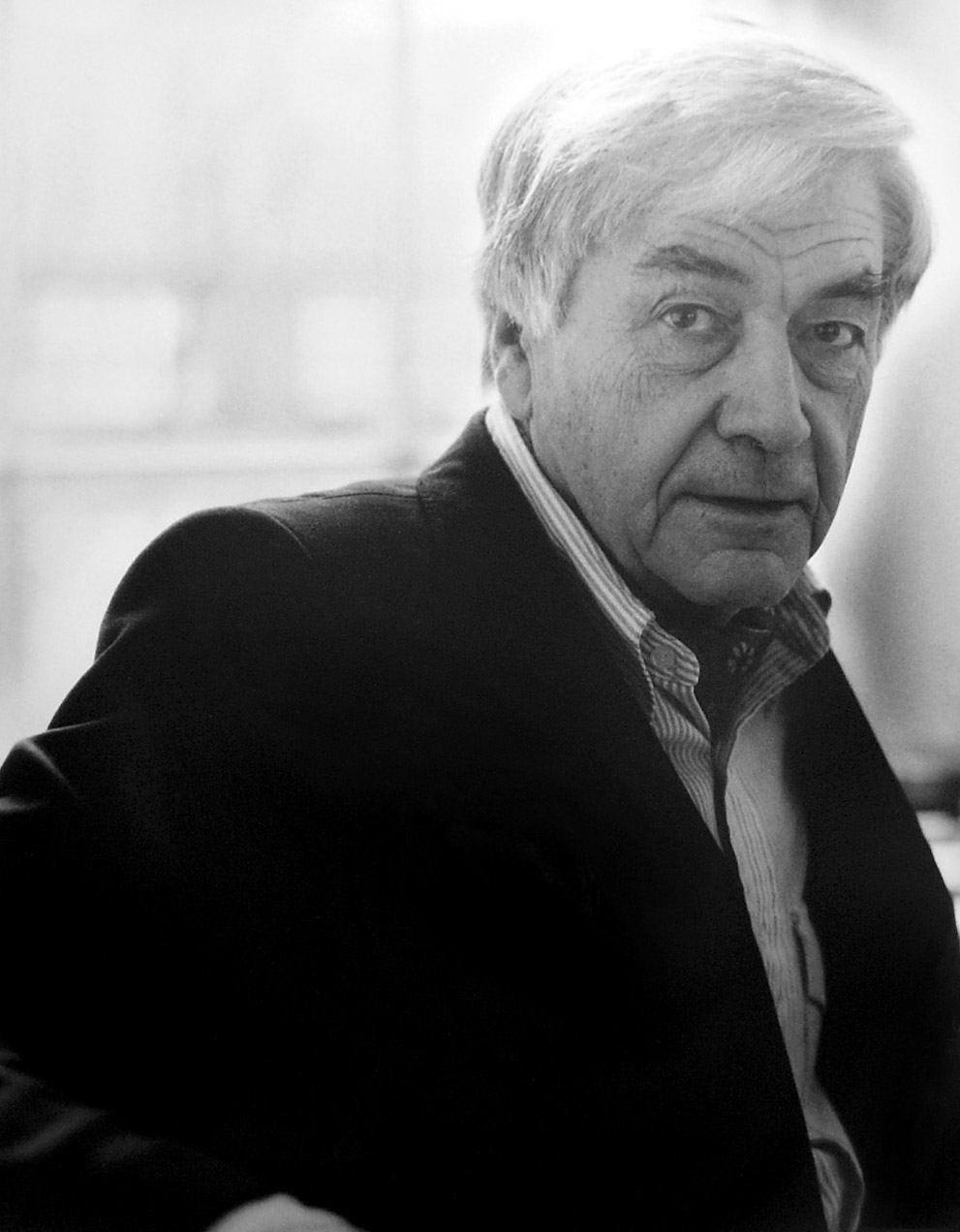
- Kee in 1987
- Born: 5 October 1919; Calcutta, British India
- Died: 11 January 2013 (aged 93)
- Education: Stowe School; Magdalen College, Oxford
- Occupations: Journalist, news and TV presenter and author
- Spouses: Janetta Woolley (m. 1948; div. 1950) Cynthia Judah (m. 1960; div. 1989) Catherine Trevelyan (m. 1990)
- Children: 3

Robert Kee CBE (5 October 1919 – 11 January 2013) was a British broadcaster, journalist, historian and writer, known for his historical works on World War II and Ireland.

== Early life and education ==
Kee was born on 5 October 1919 in Calcutta, India, to Robert Kee (1879–1958) and Dorothy Frances, née Monkman. His father was of Scottish origin, the son of a Liberal mayor of Greenock; his job as manager of a jute mill meant the family was prosperous, but he was dismissed without a pension due to the Great Depression in the early 1930s; the family returned to Britain where his father was forced to work "temporary and dead-end jobs" until the age of seventy-four, which "deeply marked" his son. His younger brother, William, was born in 1921, and became a barrister and later a circuit judge.

After attending Rottingdean School, he earned a scholarship to Stowe School, Buckingham, and read history at Magdalen College, Oxford, where he was a pupil, then a friend, of the historian A.J.P. Taylor. He considered his Stowe education as having prepared him perfectly for subsequent wartime incarceration.

== Career ==
During the Second World War he served in the Royal Air Force as a bomber pilot. Flying the Handley Page Hampden, he was shot down by flak while on a night mine-laying mission off the coast of German-occupied Holland. He was captured and spent three years in a German POW camp. This gave him material for his first book, A Crowd Is Not Company. It was first published as a novel in 1947 but was later revealed to be an autobiography. It recounts his experiences as a prisoner of war and his various escapes. The Times describes it as "arguably the best POW book ever written".

His career in journalism began immediately after the Second World War. He worked for the Picture Post, then became a special correspondent for The Sunday Times and later The Observer. He was also literary editor of The Spectator. In 1948, Kee co-founded publishing house MacGibbon & Kee with James MacGibbon and married Janetta Woolley. In 1949 Kee and Janetta were witnesses at the marriage of their friend George Orwell to Sonia Brownell. That same year his daughter Georgiana was born.

In 1958, he moved into television. He appeared for many years on both the BBC and ITV as a reporter, interviewer and presenter. He presented many current affairs programmes, including Panorama, ITN's First Report and Channel 4's Seven Days. MacGibbon & Kee was bought by Granada in 1968. He was awarded the BAFTA Richard Dimbleby Award in 1976.

Kee wrote and presented the documentary series Ireland: A Television History in 1980. The work was shown in the United Kingdom and the United States and won the Christopher Ewart-Biggs Memorial Prize. Following the series' transmission on RTÉ, the Irish national broadcaster, Kee won a Jacob's Award for his script and presentation.

He was involved in the launch of TV-am in 1983 as one of the "Famous Five", along with David Frost, Anna Ford, Michael Parkinson and Angela Rippon. Kee was also among those who campaigned for the release of the Guildford Four, the Maguire Seven and the Birmingham Six.

== Personal life ==
Kee married first, in 1948, Janetta Woolley; they had a daughter the next year and divorced in 1950. In 1960 he married television production assistant Cynthia Judah, and had two sons (one died young) and a daughter), divorcing in 1989; in 1990 he married publisher Catherine Trevelyan, OBE, daughter of the diplomat and writer Humphrey Trevelyan, Baron Trevelyan.

== Works ==
- A Crowd Is Not Company (1947), POW memoirs, issued as a novel first, reissued 1982
- The Impossible Shore (1949), novel
- Beyond Defeat by Hans Werner Richter (1950), translator
- The Five Seasons by Karl Eska (1954), translator
- A Sign Of The Times (1955), novel
- Vorkuta A Dramatic First Report on the Slave City in the Soviet Arctic by Joseph Scholmer (1955), translator
- Zero Eight Fifteen. The Strange Mutiny of Gunner Asch by Hans Hellmut Kirst (1955), translator
- The Sanity Inspectors by Friedrich Deich (1956), translator
- Before the Great Snow by Hans Pump (1959), translator
- Broadstrop In Season (1959), novel
- The Betrayed by Michael Horbach (1959), translator
- Refugee World (1961)
- Officer Factory by Hans Hellmut Kirst (1962), translator
- Forward, Gunner Asch! by Hans Hellmut Kirst (1964), translator
- The Revolt of Gunner Asch by Hans Hellmut Kirst (1964), translator
- The Return of Gunner Asch by Hans Hellmut Kirst (1967), translator
- The Most Distressful Country (1972), The Green Flag vol. 1
- The Bold Fenian Men (1972), The Green Flag vol. 2
- Ourselves Alone (1972), The Green Flag vol. 3
- Ireland: A Television History (1980)
- 1939: The Year We Left Behind (1984); in US as 1939: In the Shadow of the War
- We'll Meet Again – Photographs of Daily Life in Britain During World War Two (1984) with Joanna Smith
- 1945: The World We Fought For (1985)
- A Journalist's Odyssey (1985), with Patrick O'Donovan and Hermione O'Donovan
- Trial & Error: the Maguires, the Guildford pub bombings and British justice (1986)
- Munich: The Eleventh Hour (1988)
- The Picture Post Album: A 50th Anniversary Collection (1989)
- The Laurel and the Ivy: The Story of Charles Stewart Parnell and Irish Nationalism (1993)
- The Green Flag: A History of Irish Nationalism (2000), one-volume edition
