= Slattery's Sago Saga =

Unfinished novel by Flann O'Brien

- Author: Flann O'Brien
- Language: English
- Genre: Literary fiction
- Publication place: Ireland

Slattery's Sago Saga is an unfinished novel by Irish writer Flann O'Brien. Arthur Riordan produced a play version in 2010. The novel details the efforts of a Scottish-American woman to replace Ireland's potato crop with the hardier sago. This replacement would mean fewer reasons for Irish citizens to emigrate to the United States, as the sago plants would resist blight, so preventing the Irish from importing "popery". The book satirizes Fordism.
