= Roger Boylan =

American writer (born 1951)

Roger Boylan (born 1951) is an American writer who was raised in Ireland, France, and Switzerland. His Irish novel Killoyle, called "a virtuoso performance" by Publishers Weekly, is published by Dalkey Archive Press. His second Irish novel, The Great Pint-Pulling Olympiad, is published by Grove Press; the Village Voice said it resembled the work of James Joyce "at his comically prolix best." Both novels were translated into German by the award-winning German translator and author Harry Rowohlt. The third volume in the Killoyle trilogy, Killoyle Wine and Cheese, was published in German in 2007, and the entire Killoyle trilogy was reissued as a boxed set that year by the Swiss publisher Kein und Aber.

Killoyle was published in Italian translation in 2013 by Edizioni Nutrimenti in Rome. The translator was Mirko Zilahi de Gyurgokai.

The Irish novels were followed by a European one, The Adorations, which deals satirically with historical and religious themes, including Nazism, the Occupation of France, and mystical visions. It was published by Dalkey Archive Press in 2020. "The Adorations is Boylan's magnum opus," says one review, "moving like a fugue through the history of 20th-Century Europe."

Boylan's current work in progress is Midwestern Rhapsody, a satire set in New Ur, an imaginary university town in Ohiowa, an imaginary Midwestern state.

Boylan has been a regular contributor to Boston Review's New Fiction Forum, and his stories, reviews, and articles have appeared in many journals and reviews, including The New York Times Book Review and The Economist. He has recently completed a memoir, Run Like Blazes. He currently lives in Minnesota.

Boylan has a daughter, Margaret Boylan Selner.

== Works ==
- Killoyle, An Irish Farce, Dalkey Archive Press, 1997, 2002, 2006, 2012.
- The Great Pint-Pulling Olympiad, Grove Press, 2003.
- Killoyle, Eine Irische Farce. Translated by Harry Rowohlt. Published by Rogner und Bernhard, Hamburg, 1999.
- Rückkehr nach Killoyle : *Eine Vorwiegend Irische Farce. Translated by Harry Rowohlt. Rogner und Bernhard, Hamburg, 2002.
- Killoyle Wine and Cheese. Forthcoming in English.
- Killoyle Wein und Käse. Translated by Harry Rowohlt. Rogner und Bernhard, Berlin, 2006.
- The Adorations. Dalkey Archive Press, 2020.
- Run Like Blazes. Duvel Press, 2011.
