= De Selby =

Fictional character originally created by Flann O'Brien

De Selby with a canister of "night", as illustrated by John Farson.

De Selby (spelled "de Selby" in The Third Policeman and "De Selby" in The Dalkey Archive) is a fictional character originally created by Flann O'Brien for his novel The Third Policeman, in which the nameless narrator intends to use the proceeds of murder and robbery to publish his commentaries on de Selby – a savant who theorizes, among other things, that the earth is actually shaped like a sausage.

== Fictional character profile ==
Described as an eminent "physicist, ballistician, philosopher and psychologist", de Selby is known for his paradoxically non-scientific beliefs and personality. De Selby serves as an unseen character in The Third Policeman, where he is discussed at length in references and footnotes which tenuously link his unorthodox theories and areas of research to the plot. (In one footnote, he attempts to dilute water; in another, he posits that night is caused by the accumulation of "black air".) O'Brien's novel The Dalkey Archive focused on de Selby himself.

In The Dalkey Archive, de Selby develops a substance ("D.M.P.") capable of extracting all oxygen from an airtight enclosure, thus disrupting the sequentiality of time, incidentally making it possible to produce fine mature whiskey in a week. De Selby vows to use the substance to destroy the world in the name of God.

O'Brien's text and footnotes mention a number of de Selby's works including Golden Hours, The Country Album, A Memoir of Garcia, Layman's Atlas and the Codex. The fictional Bassett and Hatchjaw wrote biographies Lux Mundi: A memoir of de Selby and de Selby's Life and Times, both lost. Le Fournier, du Garbandier, Kraus and Le Clerque are supposed sources of de Selby material, but their works (suiting the fiction) were lost.

As discussed in Irish Philosophy, de Selby believed human existence was "a succession of static experiences each infinitely brief" and "a journey is a hallucination" which he demonstrated by travelling from Bath to Folkestone by means of picture postcards of the supposed route, barometric instruments, clocks and a device to regulate gaslight to simulate sunlight at various "times" of day. Another theory of de Selby's was that mirrors held the secret to eternity, claiming a huge array of parallel mirrors allowed him to see his own face as a boy of twelve.

== Analysis ==
De Selby has a host of critical analyzers – the narrator among them – many of whom have deeply conflicting opinions of his esoteric thoughts. Although generally held in high regard by these people (many of whom hate each other), he is thought by many to have had regrettable lapses and is even called, by implication, a "nincompoop". In The Third Policeman one of de Selby's biographers is quoted as saying "The beauty of reading a page of de Selby is that it leads one inescapably to the happy conviction that one is not, of all nincompoops, the greatest."

== In other works ==
"de Selby" and his commentators are frequently cited in the footnotes of Robert Anton Wilson's novel The Widow's Son. Wilson later included Professor de Selby as the main character in his short story "The Horror on Howth Hill" where de Selby has a conversation with J. R. "Bob" Dobbs.

Irish musician Hozier referenced De Selby in the tracks De Selby (Part 1) and De Selby (Part 2) on his 2023 album Unreal Unearth.
