= When Fiction Lives in Fiction =

When Fiction Lives in Fiction is the title of a significant narrative essay written in 1939 by the Argentinian writer Jorge Luis Borges. Weighing in at something less than three pages in length, Borges explores the teleological nature of metadocuments in fiction, for example, false documents.

Amongst the works examined in this essay are William Shakespeare's play Hamlet, with its play-within-a-play, Gustav Meyrink's novel, The Golem, with its motifs of dreams within dreams, and the nub of the essay itself, a short review of the then recently published At Swim-Two-Birds by Irish writer Flann O'Brien, with its circular daisy chain of characters writing novels about each other.
