= Harry Rowohlt =

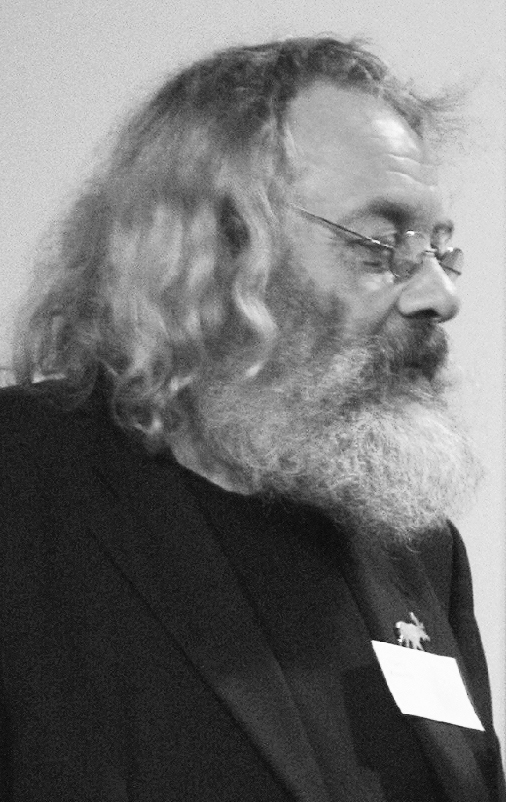
Harry Rowohlt (October 2003)

Harry Rowohlt (27 March 1945 – 15 June 2015) was a German writer and translator. He also played the role of a derelict in the famous German weekly-soap Lindenstraße.

== Background ==
Born Harry Rupp in Hamburg, Rowohlt was the son of publisher Ernst Rowohlt and actress Maria Rowohlt; his parents married in 1957.

Rowohlt is known for his insightful and humorous translation of Milne's Winnie-the-Pooh. He also published German translations of works by Philip Ardagh, Donald Barthelme, Hilaire Belloc, Roger Boylan, Edgar Rice Burroughs, Leonard Cohen, Robert Crumb, David Sedaris, Kenneth Grahame, Ernest Hemingway, Flann O'Brien, Gilbert Shelton, Shel Silverstein, James Joyce, and Kurt Vonnegut.

In 1999 he was awarded the Johann-Heinrich-Voß-Preis für Übersetzung. And in 2005, he received the Deutscher Jugendliteraturpreis for his translation work.

== Works ==
- Ich, Kater Robinson (in collaboration with Peter Schössow). – Hamburg : Carlsen, 1997. – ISBN 3-551-51460-7
- In Schlucken-zwei-Spechte (in collaboration with Ralf Sotscheck). – München : Goldmann, 2004. – ISBN 3-442-45606-1 (Something like an autobiography arranged like an interview)
- Der Kampf geht weiter. Schönen Gruß, Gottes Segen und Rot Front. Nicht weggeschmissene Briefe. – Zürich : Verl. Kein & Aber, 2005. – ISBN 3-0369-5133-4
- Pooh's corner – Meinungen und Deinungen eines Bären von geringem Verstand. – München : Heyne, 1996. – ISBN 3-453-10849-3
- John Rock oder der Teufel. – Zürich : Verl. Kein & Aber
- Pooh's Corner II – Neue Meinungen und Deinungen eines Bären von geringem Verstand. Haffmanns Verlag 1997

He also translated Andy Stanton's Mr Gum series into German.
