= Jaime Parladé =

Spanish interior designer

Jaime Parladé (1930 – 2015) was a Spanish interior designer known for his "lived-in" style. Beginning in the late 1950s, he was key in making Marbella a major hub for international style.
