= Maebh Long =

Irish academic

Maebh Long is an Irish academic specialising in Irish literature - particularly the modernist novelist and playwright Flann O'Brien, Pacific literature and the medical humanities. She holds the Eamon Cleary Chair of Irish Studies and is the Co-Director of the Centre for Irish and Scottish Studies at the University of Otago in New Zealand. Previously she held positions at the University of Waikato in New Zealand and the University of the South Pacific (USP) in Fiji.

Long is President of the Flann O'Brien Society, President of the Irish Studies Association of Australia and New Zealand and one of the co-editors of the Journal of Flann O'Brien Studies.

== Education and career ==
Long was born in Aghabullogue, County Cork, Ireland. She is a graduate of University College Cork and obtained her PhD on "Derrida and a Theory of Irony: Parabasis and Parataxis" from the University of Durham.

Her research and teaching focus on modernist and contemporary literature from Ireland, Britain, and Oceania. She has also published on literary theory, the history of medicine, and continental philosophy.

She has held fellowships at New York University, the Harry Ransom Center at the University of Texas at Austin, and the O'Donnell Fellowship in Irish Studies at the University of Melbourne.

== Flann O'Brien ==
Long is an expert on the Irish novelist and playwright Flann O'Brien and has published two award winning books on him. She has significantly impacted wider recognition of O'Brien's work. Joseph Booker called The Collected Letters of Flann O'Brien, "a major event in the documentation of modern Ireland's history. The most significant publication by Brian O'Nolan since the belated arrival in print of The Third Policeman." The Irish Studies Review said, "Reading Maebh Long's recent book, Assembling Flann O'Brien, one cannot help thinking that the poor fellow is finally getting the attention he deserves." Assembling Flann O'Brien won the 2015 International Flann O'Brien Society's "Best book length study on a Brian O'Nolan theme" In 2019 The Collected Letters of Flann O'Brien won the corresponding 2019 award.

== Pacific Literature ==
Long's academic career began with a lectureship at the University of the South Pacific, where she co-founded the Oceanian Modernism project with Dr Matthew Hayward. Drawing on her years living and working in Fiji, her research in this area traces how Oceanian writers adapted and subverted global modernisms during Pacific literature's formative decades. This work resulted in a co-edited collection, New Oceania: Modernisms and Modernities in the Pacific (2019) and the co-authored monograph, The Rise of Pacific Literature: Decolonisation, Radical Campuses and Modernism (2024), both with Hayward. The Rise of Pacific Literature won the 2025 Book Prize of the Modernist Studies Association and was shortlisted for the 2025 Literary Encyclopedia Book Prize.

Long has also written about the effect of climate change on sea level rise, particularly as it affects Pacific island nations.

== Medical Humanities ==
In 2020 Long was awarded funding by the Marsden Fund of New Zealand's Royal Society Te Apārangi for her project 'Modern Immunity', which analyses public understandings of immune systems in Ireland, Britain, New Zealand and Australia in the late nineteenth and early twentieth centuries. Using extensive research on newspaper advertising promising purchasers immunity from a range of diseases, the project considers the ways metaphors of immunity were tied to logics of individualism, protection, risk management, labour and power. Long extended this interest in medical metaphors to investigate language use during the COVID-19 pandemic.

== Selected publications ==
- (2014) Assembling Flann O'Brien. London, New Delhi, New York: Bloomsbury. ISBN 1-441190-20-1
- (2018) "Introduction: Oceania in Theory", Symploke, 26(1-2), 9-18.
- (2018) "Vanua in the Anthropocene: Relationality and Sea Level Rise in Fiji", Symploke, 26(1-2), 51-70.
- (2018) "Girmit, postmemory, and Subramani", Pacific Dynamics, 2(2), 161-175.
- (2018) The Collected Letters of Flann O'Brien. Maebh Long (editor), Dalkey Archive. ISBN 1-628971-83-5
- (2020) New Oceania: Modernisms and Modernities in the Pacific. Matthew Hayward and Maebh Long (editors), New York and London: Routledge.
- (2024) The Rise of Pacific Literature: Decolonization, Radical Campuses and Modernism. Maebh Long and Matthew Hayward, New York: Columbia.
