= Ernst Rowohlt =

German publisher (1887–1960)

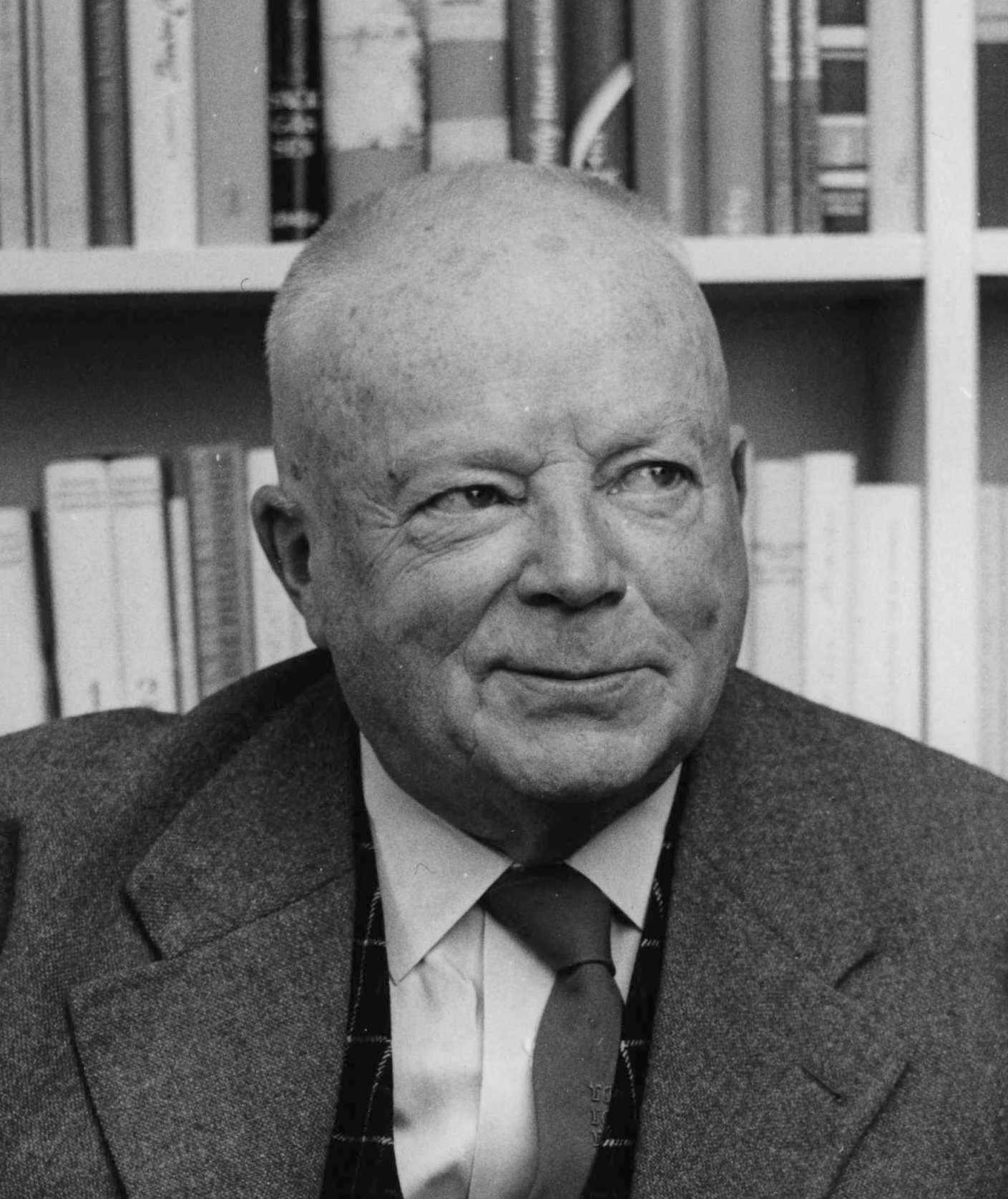
Rowohlt in 1959

Ernst Hermann Heinrich Rowohlt (23 June 1887 in Bremen – 1 December 1960 in Hamburg) was a German publisher who founded the Rowohlt publishing house in 1908 and headed it in its repeated incarnations until his death.

In 1912, he married actress Emmy Reye, but the marriage only lasted a short while. In 1921 he married Hilda Pangust and in 1957 he married Maria Pierenkämper. Rowohlt had two sons, both illegitimate: Heinrich Maria Ledig-Rowohlt (1908–1992), who succeeded him as head of the publishing house, and Harry Rowohlt (1945–2015), a writer. He also had one daughter.

As a publisher, he specialized in works by American authors including Ernest Hemingway and William Faulkner.

With the rise of the Nazis he switched to safer non-fiction and travel works, and in 1937 joined the Nazi party. He insisted on keeping his Jewish staff and editors and remained publisher for officially disapproved writers such as Hans Fallada. In 1936, he allowed Jewish author Bruno Adler to publish a biography of Adalbert Stifter under a pseudonym. When discovered in 1938, he was banned by the Nazis from working as a publisher.

Rowohlt handed control of the firm to his son Heinrich Maria Ledig-Rowohlt and fled to Brazil, but he returned to Germany during the war and became a captain in the Wehrmacht on the eastern front until his politically motivated discharge in 1943.
