= The Dalkey Archive =

1964 novel by Flann O'Brien

- First edition
- Author: Flann O'Brien
- Language: English
- Genre: Comedy, philosophical novel
- Published: 1964
- Publisher: MacGibbon & Kee
- Publication place: Ireland
- Media type: Print, hardback, 8vo
- Pages: 222
- ISBN: 0261615564
- OCLC: 2236946
- Dewey Decimal: 823.912

The Dalkey Archive is a 1964 novel by the Irish writer Flann O'Brien. It is his fifth and final novel, published two years before his death. It was adapted for the stage by Hugh Leonard in 1965 as The Saints Go Cycling In.

== Plot summary ==
The two main characters are Mick and Hackett who spend a lot of time in bars in Dalkey. After sea swimming they meet and befriend an ingenious theologian and scientist who entertains them in his well hidden home. He has developed a theory about time being strangely local and dependent upon atmosphere. He exploits the theory to age his whiskey, creating a spirit that seems to have been aged for many decades in just a few hours. The scientist, De Selby, then reveals a plan to destroy the people of the world by removing all the oxygen from the air.

De Selby leads Hackett and Mick to an underwater cave, to experience timelessness facilitated by his chemical invention. In the cave De Selby has a long theological debate with Saint Augustine; and Mick and Hackett afterwards suspect they were drugged at the time.

After a chance tip-off from a drinking companion Mick tracks down James Joyce who is living quietly in Skerries, County Dublin, under a false name. Joyce is a puzzle: apparently escaping France during the Second World War, he has lost track of his family and is a barman in a small pub. Joyce is unaware of his success as a writer acknowledging only Dubliners as his own work. After a couple of meetings with Joyce, Mick formulates a plan to introduce him to De Selby. Joyce is amenable but then reveals to Mick that he has a desire to join the Society of Jesus mainly to dispute the presence of the Holy Ghost in Christian Orthodoxy. Joyce's revelation occurs just after Mick is himself seized by a determination to join the Cistercian Order.

Mick’s plan is to foil De Selby and introduce Joyce to the Jesuits before taking a new direction in his own life, which he does but not in the way he planned.

Many prominent elements of the book, particularly De Selby himself, the eccentric policemen, and the atomic theory of the bicycle, were taken from O'Brien's much earlier novel The Third Policeman, because he had not been able to find a publisher for it. The latter novel was published posthumously.
