= The Third Policeman =

1967 novel by Flann O'Brien

- First edition
- Author: Flann O'Brien
- Language: English
- Genre: Comedy, absurdism, philosophical novel
- Publisher: MacGibbon & Kee
- Publication date: 1967
- Publication place: Ireland
- Media type: Print (hardback & paperback)
- Pages: 212 pp
- OCLC: 40489146
- Dewey Decimal: 823/.912 21
- LC Class: PR6029.N56 T48 1999

The Third Policeman is a novel by Irish writer Brian O'Nolan, writing under the pseudonym Flann O'Brien. It was written in 1939 and 1940, but after it initially failed to find a publisher, the author withdrew the manuscript from circulation and claimed he had lost it. The book remained unpublished at the time of his death in 1966. It was published by MacGibbon & Kee in 1967.

== Plot summary ==
The Third Policeman is set in rural Ireland and is narrated by a dedicated amateur scholar who studies de Selby, a scientist and philosopher. The narrator, whose name the reader never learns, is orphaned at a young age. At boarding school, he discovers the work of de Selby and becomes a fanatically dedicated student of it. One night he breaks his leg under mysterious circumstances – "if you like, it was broken for me" – and he is ultimately fitted with a wooden leg to replace the original one. On returning to his family home, he meets and befriends John Divney who is in charge of the family farm and pub. Over the next few years, the narrator devotes himself to the study of de Selby's work and leaves Divney to run the family business.

By the time the narrator is thirty, he has written what he believes to be the definitive critical work on de Selby but does not have enough money to have it published. Divney observes that Mathers, a local man, "is worth a packet of potato-meal" and eventually it dawns on the narrator that Divney plans to rob and kill Mathers. The narrator and Divney encounter Mathers one night on the road and Divney knocks Mathers down with a bicycle pump. The narrator, prompted by Divney, finishes Mathers off with a spade and then notices that Divney has disappeared with Mathers's cash box. When Divney returns, he refuses to reveal the location of the cash box and fends off the narrator's repeated inquiries. To ensure that Divney does not retrieve the box unobserved, the narrator becomes more and more inseparable from Divney, eventually sharing a bed with him: "the situation was a queer one and neither of us liked it".

Three years pass, in which the previously amicable relationship between the narrator and Divney breaks down. Eventually, Divney reveals that the box is hidden under the floorboards in Mathers's old house, and instructs the narrator to fetch it. The narrator follows Divney's instructions but just as he reaches for the box, "something happened":

It was as if the daylight had changed with unnatural suddenness, as if the temperature of the evening had altered greatly in an instant or as if the air had become twice as rare or twice as dense as it had been in the winking of an eye; perhaps all of these and other things happened together for all my senses were bewildered all at once and could give me no explanation.

The box has disappeared, and the narrator is perplexed to notice that Mathers is in the room with him. During a surreal conversation with the apparently dead Mathers, the narrator hears another voice speaking to him which he realises is his soul: "For convenience I called him Joe." The narrator is bent on finding the cash box, and when Mathers tells him about a remarkable police barracks nearby he resolves to go to the barracks and enlist the help of the police in finding the box.

On the way, he meets a one-legged bandit named Martin Finnucane, who threatens to kill him but who becomes his friend upon finding out that his potential victim is also one-legged. The narrator approaches the police barracks and is disturbed by its appearance:

It looked as if it were painted like an advertisement on a board on the roadside and indeed very poorly painted. It looked completely false and unconvincing.

Inside the barracks he meets two of the three policemen, Sergeant Pluck and Policeman MacCruiskeen, who speak largely in non-sequitur and who are entirely obsessed with bicycles. There he is introduced to various peculiar or irrational concepts, artefacts, and locations, including a contraption that collects sound and converts it to light based on a theory regarding omnium, the fundamental energy of the universe; a vast underground chamber called 'Eternity,' where time stands still, mysterious numbers are devoutly recorded and worried about by the policemen; a box from which anything you desire can be produced; and an intricately carved chest containing a series of identical but smaller chests. The infinite nature of this last device causes the narrator great mental and spiritual discomfort.

It is later discovered that Mathers has been found dead and eviscerated in a ditch. Joe suspects Martin Finnucane, but to the narrator's dismay he himself is charged with the crime because he is the most convenient suspect. He argues with Sergeant Pluck that since he is nameless, and therefore, as Pluck observed, "invisible to the law", he cannot be charged with anything. Pluck is surprised, but after he unsuccessfully attempts to guess the narrator's name he reasons that since the narrator is nameless he is not really a person, and can therefore be hanged without fear of repercussions:

The particular death you die is not even a death (which is an inferior phenomenon at best) only an insanitary abstraction in the backyard[…].

The narrator calls on the help of Finnucane, but his rescue is thwarted by MacCruiskeen riding a bicycle painted an unknown colour which drives those who see it mad. He faces the gallows, but the two policemen are called away by dangerously high readings in the underground chamber. The following day he escapes from the barracks on a bicycle of unusual perfection.

As he rides through the countryside, he passes Mathers's house and sees a light. Disturbed, he enters the house and finally meets the mysterious and reportedly all-powerful third policeman, Fox, who has the face of Mathers. Fox's secret police station is in the walls of Mathers's house. He tells the narrator that he is the architect of the readings in the underground chamber, which he alters for his amusement, thereby inadvertently saving the narrator's life. Fox goes on to tell the narrator that he found the cash box and has sent it to the narrator's home, where it is waiting for him. He also reveals that the box contains not money but omnium, which can become anything he desires. Elated by the possibilities before him, the narrator leaves Fox's police station and goes home looking forward to seeing Divney once again; on arrival, he finds that while only a few days have passed in his own life, his accomplice is sixteen years older, with a wife and children. Divney can see the narrator, although the others cannot, and he has a heart attack from the shock. He shouts that the narrator was supposed to be dead, for the black box was not filled with money but a bomb and it exploded when the narrator reached for it. The narrator leaves Divney on the floor, apparently dying.

Feeling "sad, empty and without a thought", the narrator leaves the house and walks away down the road. He soon approaches the police barracks, the book using exactly the same words to describe the barracks and the narrator's opinion of it that were used earlier, the story having circled around itself and restarted. This time, John Divney joins the narrator on the road; they neither look at nor speak to each other. They both enter the police station and are confronted by Sergeant Pluck, who repeats his earlier dialogue and ends the book with a reprise of his original greeting to the narrator:

"Is it about a bicycle?" he asked.

== Publication history ==
In 1940, O'Nolan completed the novel and circulated the typescript among friends in Dublin. He submitted it to Longman's, the English publisher of his first novel, At Swim-Two-Birds, but they declined to publish it. O'Nolan believed that Graham Greene, who had been a champion of his at Longman, was still a reader with the company, but he was not. Consequently, the novel fell on less sympathetic ears. The rejection notice read in part:

We realize the author's ability but think that he should become less fantastic and in this new novel he is more so.

The American author William Saroyan, who had become acquainted with O'Nolan during a brief stay in Dublin, offered the use of his literary agent in finding an American publisher, but with no success. O'Nolan made no further attempts at publication and shelved the manuscript, claiming that it had been lost. O'Nolan told his friends that while driving through Donegal the boot of his car opened unknown to him, causing the manuscript to flutter out page by page until it was gone. In reality he left it on the sideboard in his dining room, in plain view to him every day as he ate, for 26 years. He later used elements of The Third Policeman in his 1964 novel The Dalkey Archive. After O'Nolan's death in 1966, his widow Evelyn O'Nolan sent the typescript to MacGibbon & Kee, O'Nolan's publishers throughout the 1950s and 1960s. The firm published the book in 1967. Reviewer Thomas Kilroy described it as a "masterpiece".

== O'Nolan's opinion ==
In a letter to William Saroyan, dated 14 February 1940, O'Nolan explained the strange plot of The Third Policeman:

When you get to the end of this book you realize that my hero or main character (he's a heel and a killer) has been dead throughout the book and that all the queer ghastly things which have been happening to him are happening in a sort of hell which he earned for the killing … It is made clear that this sort of thing goes on for ever … When you are writing about the world of the dead – and the damned – where none of the rules and laws (not even the law of gravity) holds good, there is any amount of scope for back-chat and funny cracks.

In a passage that was omitted from the published novel, O'Nolan wrote:

Joe had been explaining things in the meantime. He said it was again the beginning of the unfinished, the re-discovery of the familiar, the re-experience of the already suffered, the fresh-forgetting of the unremembered. Hell goes round and round. In shape it is circular and by nature it is interminable, repetitive and very nearly unbearable.

== Critical interpretations ==
Critical interpretations to The Third Policeman have been varied. Anne Clissman, writing in 1975 in the first major study of Flann O'Brien's work, considers the book to be "in many ways a continuation of some of the ideas expressed in At Swim". She described the book as "in parts, extremely amusing, but the overall effect is anything but funny" and noted that the book "shows a fixity of purpose and clarity" which she contrasted with the "organised chaos" of At Swim-Two-Birds. Clissman regards the novel as a less experimental work than At Swim:

Its central concern is not, as in At Swim, with varying methods of presenting reality in fiction, but with reality viewed through the medium of scientific and philosophical concepts.

Keith Hopper, writing twenty years after Clissman, regards The Third Policeman somewhat differently. Regarding it as "the first great masterpiece […] of what we generally refer to now as post-modernism", he argues that the book is not less but more formally experimental than At Swim-Two-Birds:

Contrary to O'Nolan's assertion that this novel was without the 'difficulties and fireworks' of At Swim-Two-Birds, this is a more radical and involved metafictional fantasy[…].

Hopper interprets the narrator's journey as "a quest to discover the borderland between reality and fiction", noting the narrator's "flickering between an awareness that he is a character trapped within a fictional order and his realist belief that he is a 'real-life' person". Hopper also notes the wide range of intellectual and cultural influences on the book, including John M. Synge's play The Playboy of the Western World, J.K. Huysmans's novel À rebours, Einstein's theory of relativity, the works of J. W. Dunne and Cartesian dualism. More recent work, such as that of Maebh Long in Assembling Flann O’Brien and the edited collection Flann O’Brien and Modernism tend to view O’Brien as a modernist rather than a postmodernist.

The critic Hugh Kenner, in a 1997 essay entitled "The Fourth Policeman", advanced a hypothesis to explain why O'Nolan had suppressed the manuscript. Noting the complex ways in which the novel draws on pagan traditions in Middle and Early Modern Irish literature, as well as the ways in which it confounds attempts to inscribe it within a realist tradition, Kenner argued that the book created a "cartoon of Ireland" that was "brilliant but disturbingly coherent." Kenner argues that the book's failure to find a publisher must have caused O'Nolan to reread it, whereupon O'Nolan (in Kenner's account) must have been so "unsettled" by the book's effect, "for he liked his effects under rational control […] and this book grimaced at him, from expressive levels he was careful never to monkey with again", that he suppressed it; not out of despair of it reaching a publisher but because it offended his own "explicitly formed and highly orthodox conscience". Kenner calls O'Nolan's Catholic conscience the "Fourth Policeman" of his essay's title.

== Allusions in other works ==
The Third Policeman was featured in a 2005 episode of television series Lost with the intent of providing context for the show's complex mythology, with the result that sales of the book in the three weeks following its mention equalled what it had sold in the preceding six years.

Jazz musician Django Bates based his 1990 album Music for The Third Policeman on the novel.

John Cooper Clarke's nonsense prose poem, "Ten years in an open necked shirt" contains the line "What with the drink trade on its last legs and the land running fallow for the want of artificial manures", the same line John Divney uses in the book to explain their lack of funds.

A book cover of the Norwegian book edition is displayed in the last scene of the movie Next Door (2005).

Irish musician Hozier referenced The Third Policeman in the tracks De Selby (Part 1) and De Selby (Part 2) on his 2023 album Unreal Unearth.

The Stump album A Fierce Pancake is named after, and influenced by, the book.

== Adaptations ==
The book was adapted by the Ridiculusmus theatre company. The dramatic production premiered at Aras na nGael, London in 1992 and toured in repertory until 1997. The book was also adapted for an open-air theatre production by Miracle Theatre in 2017, with The Stage judging it to be an "Enjoyably absurd and inventively staged alfresco summer theatre".
