= Maria Rowohlt =

German actress

Maria Rowohlt (born as Maria Pierenkämper; 5 June 1910 in Bochum – 11 April 2005 in Hamburg) was a German actress. She was married several times, amongst others to Max Rupp and to Ernst Rowohlt.
