= Flann O'Brien =

Irish writer (1911–1966)

- Born: Brian O'Nolan; 5 October 1911; Strabane, County Tyrone, Ireland
- Died: 1 April 1966 (aged 54); Dublin, Ireland
- Resting place: Dean's Grange Cemetery
- Education: University College Dublin
- Occupations: Civil servant, writer
- Spouse: Evelyn McDonnell (m. 1948)
- Writing career
- Pen name: Flann O'Brien; Myles na Gopaleen; Brother Barnabas; George Knowall
- Genres: Metafiction, satire
- Notable works: At Swim-Two-Birds (1939); An Béal Bocht (1941); The Hard Life (1961); The Dalkey Archive (1964); The Third Policeman (1967); "Cruiskeen Lawn" column

Brian O'Nolan (Irish: Brian Ó Nualláin; 5 October 1911 – 1 April 1966), whose pen names included Flann O'Brien, was an Irish Civil Service official, novelist, playwright and satirist, who is now considered a major figure in twentieth-century Irish literature. Born in Strabane, County Tyrone, he is regarded as a key figure in modernist and postmodern literature. His four English-language novels, At Swim-Two-Birds (1939), The Hard Life (1961), The Dalkey Archive (1964) and The Third Policeman (1967), were published under the pen name Flann O'Brien. His many satirical columns in The Irish Times and an Irish-language novel, An Béal Bocht (1941), were written under the name Myles na gCopaleen.

O'Brien's novels have attracted a wide following both for their unconventional humour and as prominent examples of modernist metafiction. As a novelist, O'Brien was influenced by James Joyce. He was nonetheless sceptical of the "cult" of Joyce, saying "I declare to God if I hear that name Joyce one more time I will surely froth at the gob."

== Biography ==
=== Family and early life ===
O'Brien's father, Michael Vincent O'Nolan, was an official in HM Customs, a role that required frequent moves between cities and towns in England, Scotland and Ireland. Although of apparently trenchant Irish republican views, because of his role and employment he needed to be discreet about them. At the formation of the Irish Free State in 1921, O'Nolan senior joined the Irish Revenue Commissioners.

O'Brien's mother, Agnes (née Gormley), was also from an Irish nationalist family in Strabane, and this largely nationalist and Catholic town formed somewhat of a base for the family during an otherwise peripatetic childhood. Brian was the third of 12 children: Gearóid, Ciarán, Roisin, Fergus, Kevin, Maeve, Nessa, Nuala, Sheila, Niall, and Micheál (in that period, known as the Gaelic Revival, giving one's children Gaelic names was something of a political statement). Though relatively well-off and upwardly mobile, the O'Nolan children were home-schooled for part of their childhood using a correspondence course created by his father, who would send it to them from wherever his work took him. It was not until his father was permanently assigned to Dublin that Brian and his siblings regularly attended school.

=== School days ===
O'Brien attended Synge Street Christian Brothers School, Dublin, of which his novel The Hard Life contains a semi-autobiographical depiction. The Christian Brothers in Ireland had a reputation for excessive, prolific and unnecessary use of violence and corporal punishment, which sometimes inflicted lifelong psychological trauma upon their pupils.

Blackrock College, however, where O'Brien's education continued, was run by the Holy Ghost Fathers, who were considered more intellectual and less likely to use corporal punishment against their students. Blackrock was, and remains, a very prominent school, having educated many of the leaders of post-independence Ireland, including presidents, taoisigh (prime ministers), government ministers, businessmen and the elite of "Official Ireland" and their children.

O'Brien was taught English by the President of the College, and future Archbishop, John Charles McQuaid.

According to Farragher and Wyer:

Dr McQuaid himself was recognised as an outstanding English teacher, and when one of his students, Brian O'Nolan, alias Myles na gCopaleen, boasted in his absence to the rest of the class that there were only two people in the College who could write English properly, namely, Dr McQuaid and himself, they had no hesitation in agreeing. And Dr McQuaid did Myles the honour of publishing a little verse by him in the first issue of the revived College Annual (1930)—this being Myles' first published item.

The poem itself, "Ad Astra", read as follows:

Ah! When the skies at night
Are damascened with gold,
Methinks the endless sight
Eternity unrolled.

=== Student years ===
O'Brien wrote prodigiously during his years as a student at University College Dublin (UCD), which was then situated in various buildings around Dublin's south city centre (with its numerous pubs and cafés). There he was an active, and controversial, member of the well-known Literary and Historical Society. He contributed to the student magazine, called in Irish Comhthrom Féinne (Fair Play), under various guises, in particular the pseudonym Brother Barnabas. Significantly, he composed a story during this same period titled "Scenes in a Novel (probably posthumous) by Brother Barnabas", which anticipates many of the ideas and themes later to be found in his 1939 novel At Swim-Two-Birds. In it, the putative author of the story finds himself in riotous conflict with his characters, who are determined to follow their own paths regardless of the author's design. For example, the villain of the story, one Carruthers McDaid, intended by the author as the lowest form of a scoundrel, "meant to sink slowly to absolutely the last extremities of human degradation", instead ekes out a modest living selling cats to elderly ladies and begins covertly attending Mass without the author's consent. Meanwhile, the story's hero, Shaun Svoolish, chooses a comfortable, bourgeois life rather than romance and heroics:

'I may be a prig', he replied, 'but I know what I like. Why can't I marry Bridie and have a shot at the Civil Service?'
'Railway accidents are fortunately rare', I said finally, 'but when they happen they are horrible. Think it over.'

In 1934 O'Brien and his university friends founded a short-lived literary magazine called Blather. The writing here, though clearly bearing the marks of youthful bravado, again somewhat anticipates O'Brien's later work, in this case, his "Cruiskeen Lawn" column as Myles na Gopaleen:

Blather is here. As we advance to make our bow, you will look in vain for signs of servility or of any evidence of a desire to please. We are an arrogant and depraved body of men. We are as proud as bantams and as vain as peacocks.

Blather doesn't care. A sardonic laugh escapes us as we bow, cruel and cynical hounds that we are. It is a terrible laugh, the laugh of lost men. Do you get the smell of porter?

O'Brien, who had studied German in Dublin, may have spent at least parts of 1933 and 1934 staying in Nazi Germany, namely in Cologne and Bonn, although details are uncertain and contested. He claimed himself, in 1965, that he "spent many months in the Rhineland and at Bonn drifting away from the strict pursuit of study." So far, no external evidence has turned up that would back up this sojourn (or an also anecdotal short-term marriage to one 'Clara Ungerland' from Cologne). In their biography, Costello and van de Kamp, discussing the inconclusive evidence, state that "...it must remain a mystery, in the absence of documented evidence an area of mere speculation, representing in a way the other mysteries of the life of Brian O'Nolan that still defy the researcher."

=== Civil service ===
A key feature of O'Brien's personal situation was his status as an Irish civil servant, who, as a result of his father's relatively early death in July 1937, was for a decade obliged to partially support his mother and ten siblings, including an elder brother who was then an unsuccessful writer (there would likely have been some pension for his mother and minor siblings resulting from his father's service); however, other siblings enjoyed considerable professional success. One, Kevin (also known as Caoimhín Ó Nualláin), was a Professor of Ancient Classics at University College, Dublin; yet another, Micheál Ó Nualláin was a noted artist; another, Ciarán Ó Nualláin, was a writer, novelist, publisher and journalist. Given the desperate poverty of Ireland in the 1930s to 1960s, a job as a civil servant was considered prestigious, being both secure and pensionable with a reliable cash income in a largely agrarian economy. The Irish Civil Service has been, since the Irish Civil War, fairly strictly apolitical. Civil Service Regulations and the service's internal culture generally prohibit Civil Servants above the level of Clerical Officer from publicly expressing political views. As a practical matter, this meant that writing in newspapers on current events was, during O'Brien's career, generally prohibited without departmental permission which would be granted on an article-by-article, publication-by-publication basis. This fact alone contributed to O'Brien's use of pseudonyms, though he had started to create character authors even in his pre-civil service writings.

O'Brien rose to be quite senior, serving as private secretary to Seán T. O'Kelly (a minister and later President of Ireland) and Seán MacEntee, a powerful political figure, both of whom almost certainly knew or guessed O'Brien was na gCopaleen. Civil servants selected to be a minister’s private secretary are usually considered to be potential “high flyers.” Though O'Brien's writing frequently mocked the civil service, he was for much of his career relatively important and highly regarded and was trusted with delicate tasks and policies, such as running (as "secretary") the public inquiry into the Cavan Orphanage Fire of 1943 and planning of a proposed Irish National Health Service imitating the UK's, under the auspices of his department—planning he duly mocked in his pseudonymous column.

In reality, that Brian O'Nolan was Flann O'Brien and Myles na gCopaleen was an open secret, largely disregarded by his colleagues, who found his writing very entertaining; this was a function of the makeup of the civil service, which recruited leading graduates by competitive examination. It was an erudite and relatively liberal body in the Ireland of the 1930s to the 1970s. Nonetheless, had O'Nolan forced the issue, by using one of his known pseudonyms or his own name for an article that seriously upset politicians, consequences would likely have followed—contributing to the acute pseudonym problem in attributing his work today.

A combination of his gradually deepening alcoholism, legendarily outrageous behaviour when, frequently, inebriated, and his habit of making derogatory and increasingly reckless remarks about senior politicians in his newspaper columns led to his forced retirement from the civil service in 1953 after enraging a minister who realised he was the unnamed target whose intellect was ridiculed in several columns. One column described the politician's reaction to any question requiring even a trace of intellectual effort as "[t]he great jaw would drop, the ruined graveyard of tombstone teeth would be revealed, the eyes would roll, and the malt eroded voice would say 'Hah?'" (He departed, recalled a colleague, "in a final fanfare of fucks".)

=== Personal life ===
Although O'Brien was a well-known character in Dublin during his lifetime, relatively little is known about his personal life. He joined the Irish Civil Service in 1935, working in the Department of Local Government. For a decade or so after his father's death in 1937, he helped support his brothers and sisters, eleven in total, on his income. On 2 December 1948 he married Evelyn McDonnell, a typist in the Department of Local Government. On his marriage he moved from his parental home in Blackrock to nearby Merrion Avenue, living at several further locations in South Dublin before his death. The couple had no children. Evelyn died on 18 April 1995.

=== Health and death ===
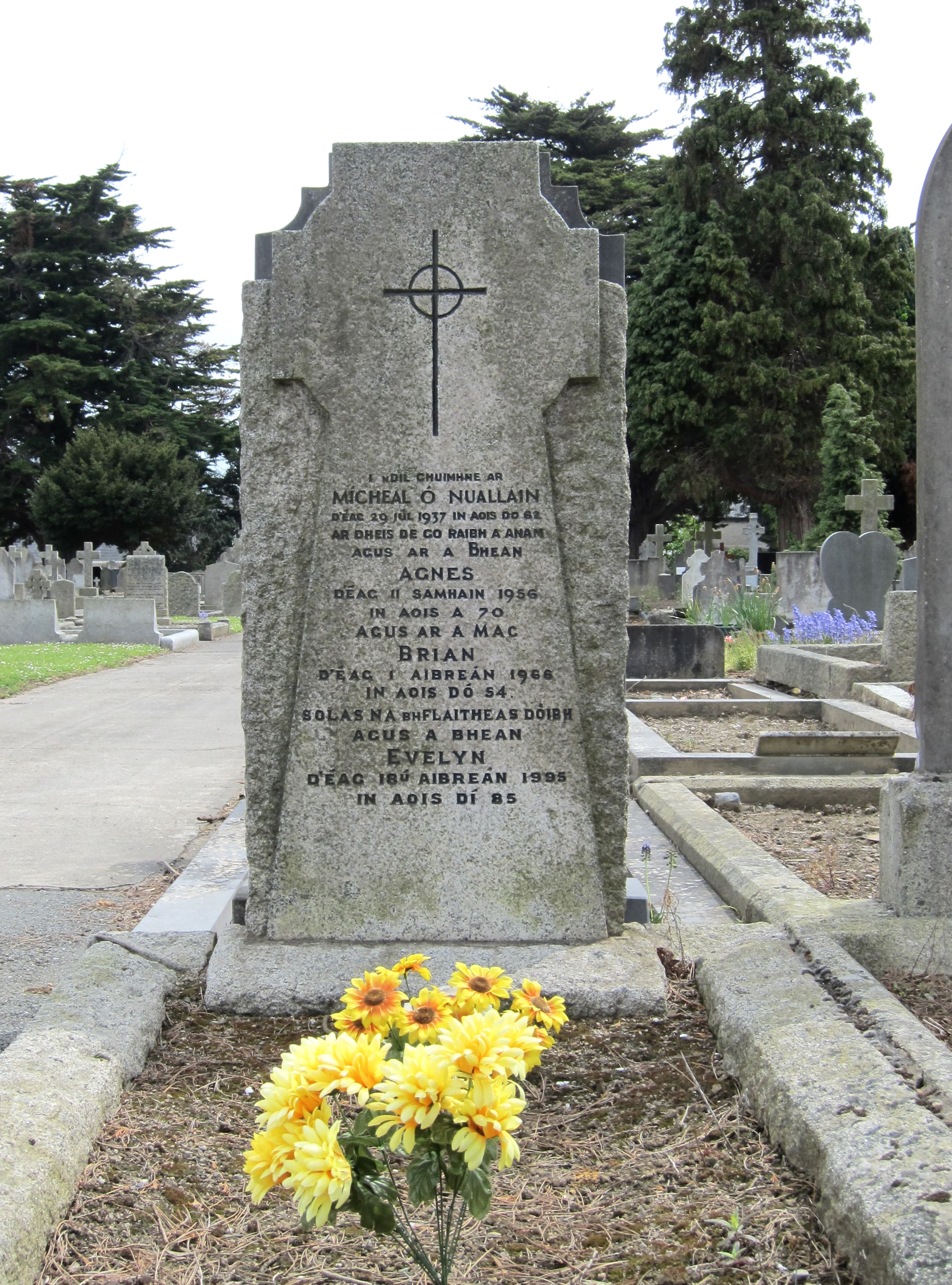
Grave of Brian O'Nolan/Brian Ó Nualláin, his parents and his wife, Deans Grange Cemetery, Dublin

O'Brien was an alcoholic for much of his life and suffered from ill health in his later years. He was afflicted with cancer of the throat and died from a heart attack on the morning of 1 April 1966. In a piece published a few months before his death, he also reported a secondary cancer diagnosis and hospitalisations due to uraemia (a sign of renal failure) and pleurisy: in typical good-humour O'Brien attributed this declining health to "St Augustine's vengeance" over his treatment in The Dalkey Archive.

== Journalism and other writings ==
From late 1940 to early 1966, O'Brien wrote short columns for The Irish Times under the title "Cruiskeen Lawn", using the moniker Myles na gCopaleen (changing that to Myles na Gopaleen in late 1952, having put the column on hold for most of that year). For the first year, the columns were in Irish. Then, he alternated columns in Irish with columns in English, but by late 1953 he had settled on English only. His newspaper column, "Cruiskeen Lawn" (transliterated from the Irish "crúiscín lán", meaning "full/brimming small-jug"), has its origins in a series of pseudonymous letters written to The Irish Times, originally intended to mock the publication in that same newspaper of a poem, "Spraying the Potatoes", by the writer Patrick Kavanagh:

I am no judge of poetry—the only poem I ever wrote was produced when I was body and soul in the gilded harness of Dame Laudanum—but I think Mr Kavanaugh [sic] is on the right track here. Perhaps the Irish Times, timeless champion of our peasantry, will oblige us with a series in this strain covering such rural complexities as inflamed goat-udders, warble-pocked shorthorn, contagious abortion, non-ovoid oviducts and nervous disorders among the gentlemen who pay the rent [well known Irish slang for pigs].

The Irish Times has, traditionally, published a lot of letters from readers, devoting a full page daily to such letters, which are widely read. Often an epistolary series, some written by O'Brien and some not, continued for days and weeks under a variety of false names, using various styles and assailed varied topics, including other earlier letters by O'Brien under different pseudonyms. The letters were a hit with the readers of The Irish Times, and R. M. Smyllie, then editor of the newspaper, invited O'Brien to contribute a column. Importantly, The Irish Times maintained that there were in fact three pseudonymous authors of the "Cruiskeen Lawn" column, which provided a certain amount of cover for O'Nolan as a civil servant when a column was particularly provocative (though it was mostly O'Brien). The managing editor of The Irish Times for much of the period, Gerard "Cully" Tynan O'Mahony (father of the comedian Dave Allen), a personal friend and drinking companion of O'Brien, and likely one of the other occasional authors of the column, was typically one of those pressed for a name but was skilfully evasive on the topic. (Relations are said to have decayed when O'Nolan somehow snatched and absconded with O'Mahoney's prosthetic leg during a drinking session [the original had been lost on military service].)

The first column appeared on 4 October 1940, under the pseudonym "An Broc" ("The Badger"). In all subsequent columns, the name "Myles na gCopaleen" ("Myles of the Little Horses" or "Myles of the Ponies" — a name taken from The Collegians, a novel by Gerald Griffin) – was used. Initially, the column was composed in Irish, but soon English was used primarily, with occasional smatterings of German, French or Latin. The sometimes intensely satirical column's targets included the Dublin literary elite, Irish language revivalists, the Irish government, and the "Plain People of Ireland". The following column excerpt, in which the author wistfully recalls a brief sojourn in Germany as a student, illustrates the biting humour and scorn that informed the "Cruiskeen Lawn" writings:

I notice these days that the Green Isle is getting greener. Delightful ulcerations resembling buds pit the branches of our trees, clumpy daffodils can be seen on the upland lawn. Spring is coming and every decent girl is thinking of that new Spring costume. Time will run on smoother till Favonius re-inspire the frozen Meade and clothe in fresh attire the lily and rose that have not sown nor spun. Curse it, my mind races back to my Heidelberg days. Sonya and Lili. And Magda. And Ernst Schmutz, Georg Geier, Theodor Winkleman, Efrem Zimbalist, Otto Grün. And the accordion player Kurt Schachmann. And Doktor Oreille, descendant of Irish princes. Ich hab' mein Herz/ in Heidelberg verloren/ in einer lauen/ Sommernacht/ Ich war verliebt/ bis über beide/ Ohren/ und wie ein Röslein/hatt'/ Ihr Mund gelächt or something humpty tumpty tumpty tumpty tumpty mein Herz it schlägt am Neckarstrandm. A very beautiful student melody. Beer and music and midnight swims in the Neckar. Chats in erse with Kun O'Meyer and John Marquess ... Alas, those chimes. Und als wir nahmen/ Abschied vor den Toren/ beim letzten Küss, da hab' Ich Klar erkannt/ dass Ich mein Herz/ in Heidelberg verloren/ MEIN HERZ/ es schlägt am Neck-ar-strand! Tumpty tumpty tum.

The Plain People of Ireland: Isn't the German very like the Irish? Very guttural and so on?

Myself: Yes.

The Plain People of Ireland: People say that the German language and the Irish language is very guttural tongues.

Myself: Yes.

The Plain People of Ireland: The sounds is all guttural do you understand.

Myself. Yes.

The Plain People of Ireland: Very guttural languages the pair of them the Gaelic and the German.

Ó Nuallain/na gCopaleen wrote "Cruiskeen Lawn" for The Irish Times until the year of his death, 1966.

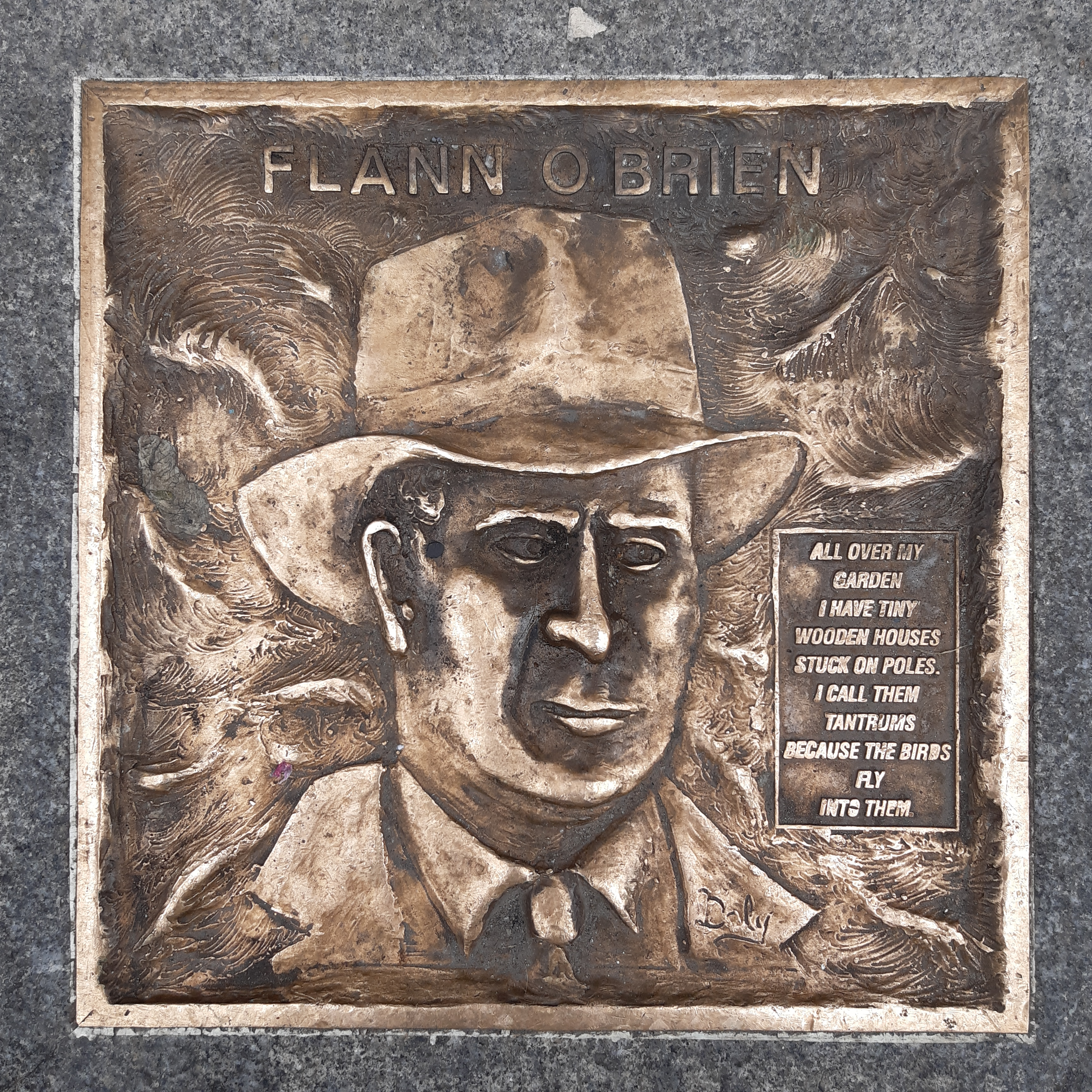
Bronze memorial to Flann O'Brien in the pavement outside The Palace Bar on Dublin's Fleet Street

He contributed substantially to Envoy (he was "honorary editor" for the special number featuring James Joyce) and formed part of the (famously heavy drinking) Envoy / McDaid's pub circle of artistic and literary figures that included Patrick Kavanagh, Anthony Cronin, Brendan Behan, John Jordan, Pearse Hutchinson, J. P. Donleavy and artist Desmond MacNamara who, at the author's request, created the book cover for the first edition of The Dalkey Archive. O'Brien also contributed to The Bell. He also wrote a column titled Bones of Contention for the Nationalist and Leinster Times under the pseudonym George Knowall; those were collected in the volume Myles Away From Dublin.

Most of his later writings were occasional pieces published in periodicals, some of very limited circulation, which explains why his work has only recently come to enjoy the considered attention of literary scholars. O'Brien was also notorious for his prolific use and creation of pseudonyms for much of his writing, including short stories, essays, and letters to editors, and even perhaps novels, which has rendered the compilation of a complete bibliography of his writings an almost impossible task. Under pseudonyms, he regularly wrote to various newspapers, particularly The Irish Times, waspish letters targeting various well-known figures and writers; mischievously, some of the pseudonymous author-identities reflected composite caricatures of existing people, this would also fuel speculation as to whether his model (or models) for the character was in fact the author writing under a pseudonym, apparently leading to social controversy and angry arguments and accusations. He would allegedly write letters to the editor of The Irish Times complaining about his own articles published in that newspaper, for example in his regular "Cruiskeen Lawn" column, or irate, eccentric and even mildly deranged pseudonymous responses to his own pseudonymous letters, which gave rise to rampant speculation as to whether the author of a published letter existed or not, or who it might in fact be. There is also persistent speculation that he wrote some of a very long series of penny dreadful detective novels (and stories) featuring a protagonist called Sexton Blake under the pseudonym Stephen Blakesley, he may have been the early science fiction writer John Shamus O'Donnell, who published in Amazing Stories at least one science fiction story in 1932, while there is also speculation about author names such as John Hackett, Peter the Painter (an obvious pun on a Mauser pistol favoured by the war of independence and civil war IRA and an eponymous anarchist), Winnie Wedge, John James Doe and numerous others. Not surprisingly, much of O'Brien's pseudonymous activity has not been verified.

== Etymology ==
O'Brien's journalistic pseudonym is taken from a character (Myles-na-Coppaleen) in Dion Boucicault's play The Colleen Bawn (itself an adaptation of Gerald Griffin's The Collegians), who is the stereotypical charming Irish rogue. At one point in the play, he sings the ancient anthem of the Irish Brigades on the Continent, the song "An Crúiscín Lán" (hence the name of the column in The Irish Times).

Capall is the Irish word for "horse" (from Vulgar Latin caballus), and "een" (spelled ín in Irish) is a diminutive suffix. The prefix na gCapaillín is the genitive plural in his Ulster Irish dialect (the Standard Irish would be "Myles na gCapaillíní"), so Myles na gCopaleen means "Myles of the Little Horses". Capaillín is also the Irish word for "pony", as in the name of Ireland's most famous and ancient native horse breed, the Connemara pony.

O'Brien himself always insisted on the translation "Myles of the Ponies", saying that he did not see why the principality of the pony should be subjugated to the imperialism of the horse.

== Fiction ==
=== At Swim-Two-Birds ===
At Swim-Two-Birds works entirely with borrowed characters from other fiction and legend, on the grounds that there are already far too many existing fictional characters.

The book is recognised as one of the most significant modernist novels before 1945. It has also been read as a pioneer of postmodernism, although the academic Keith Hopper has argued that The Third Policeman, superficially less radical, is actually a more deeply subversive and proto-postmodernist work, and as such, possibly a representation of literary nonsense. It was one of the last books that James Joyce read and he praised it to O'Brien's friends—praise which was subsequently used for years as a blurb on reprints of O'Brien's novels. The book was also praised by Graham Greene, who was working as a reader when the book was put forward for publication. Argentine writer Jorge Luis Borges, whose work might be said to bear some similarities to that of O'Brien, praised the book in his essay "When Fiction Lives in Fiction".

The British writer Anthony Burgess stated, "If we don't cherish the work of Flann O'Brien we are stupid fools who don't deserve to have great men. Flann O'Brien is a very great man." Burgess included At Swim-Two-Birds on his list of Ninety-Nine Novels: The Best in English since 1939. At Swim-Two-Birds has had a troubled publication history in the USA. Southern Illinois University Press has set up a Flann O'Brien Center and begun publishing all of O'Brien's works. Consequently, academic attention to the novel has increased.

=== The Third Policeman and The Dalkey Archive ===
The rejection of The Third Policeman by publishers in his lifetime had a profound effect on O'Brien. This is perhaps reflected in The Dalkey Archive, in which sections of The Third Policeman are recycled almost word for word, namely the atomic theory and the character De Selby.

The Third Policeman has a fantastic plot of a murderous protagonist let loose in a strange world peopled by overweight policemen, played against a satire of academic debate on an eccentric philosopher called De Selby. Sergeant Pluck introduces the atomic theory of the bicycle.

The Dalkey Archive features a character who encounters a penitent, elderly and apparently unbalanced James Joyce (who dismissively refers to his work by saying 'I have published little' and, furthermore, does not seem aware of having written and published Finnegans Wake) working as an assistant barman or 'curate'—another small joke relating to Joyce's alleged priestly ambitions—in the resort of Skerries. The scientist De Selby seeks to suck all of the air out of the world, and Policeman Pluck learns of the molecule theory from Sergeant Fottrell. The Dalkey Archive was adapted for the stage in September 1965 by Hugh Leonard as The Saints Go Cycling In.

=== Other fiction ===
Other books written by O'Brien include An Béal Bocht—translated from the Irish as The Poor Mouth—(a parody of Tomás Ó Criomhthain's autobiography An t-Oileánach—in English The Islander), and The Hard Life (a fictional autobiography meant to be his "masterpiece"). As noted above he may, between 1946 and 1952, have been one of the writers to use the pseudonym Stephen Blakesley to write up to eight books of the protracted series of "penny dreadful" Sexton Blake novels and stories, and he may have written yet more fiction under a wide array of pseudonyms.

O'Brien's theatrical output was unsuccessful. Faustus Kelly, a play about a local councillor selling his soul to the devil for a seat in the Dáil, ran for only 11 performances in 1943. A second play, Rhapsody in Stephen's Green, also called The Insect Play, was a reworking of the Capek Brothers' synonymous play using anthropomorphised insects to satirise society. It also was put on in 1943 but quickly folded, possibly because of the offence it gave to various interests including Catholics, Ulster Protestants, Irish civil servants, Corkmen, and the Fianna Fail party. The play was thought lost, but was rediscovered in 1994 in the archives of Northwestern University.

In 1956, O'Brien was co-producer of a production for RTÉ, the Irish broadcaster, of 3 Radio Ballets, which was just what it said it was—a dance performance in three parts designed for and performed on radio.

== Legacy ==
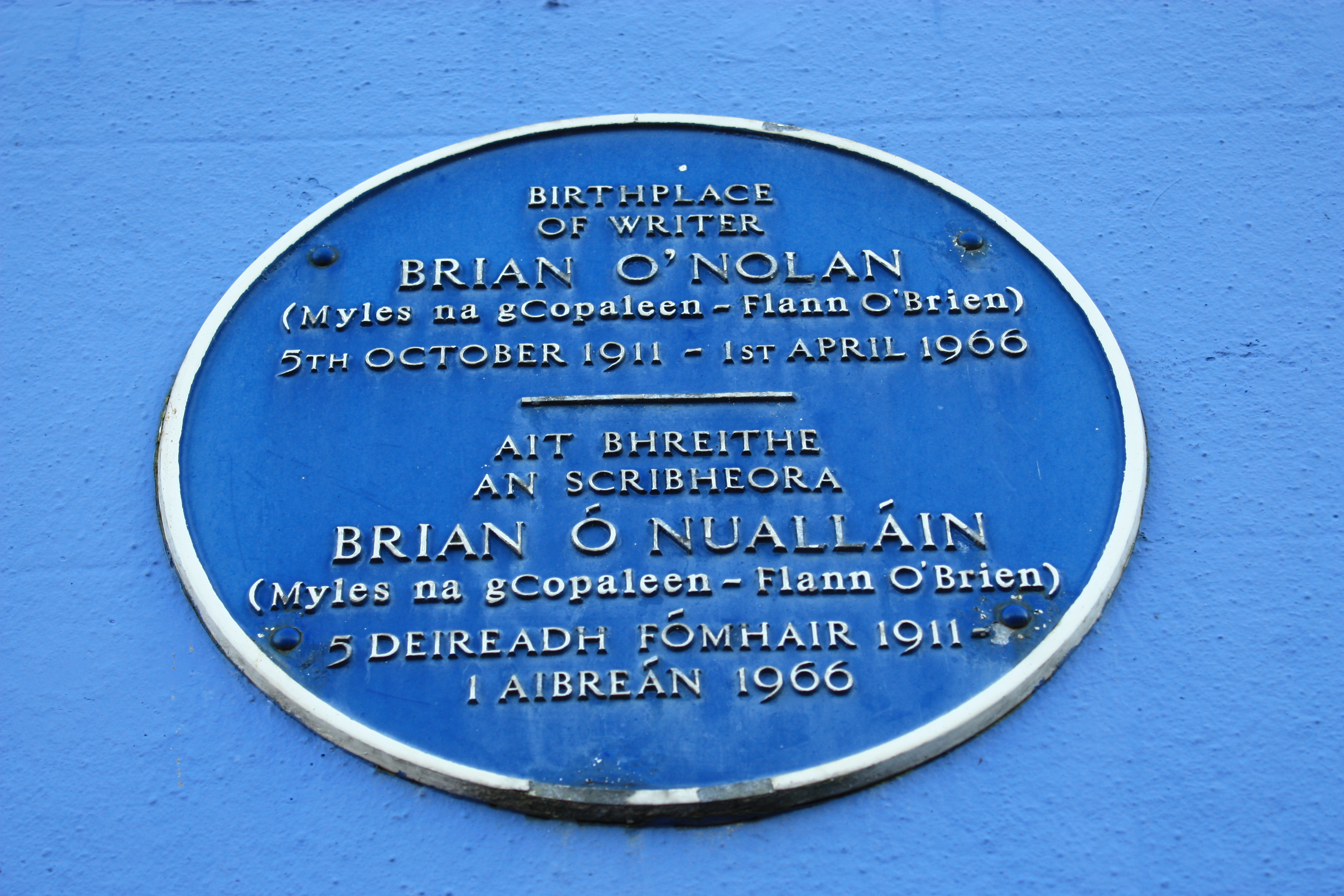
Blue plaque for O'Brien at Bowling Green, Strabane

O'Brien influenced the science fiction writer and conspiracy theory satirist Robert Anton Wilson, who has O'Brien's character De Selby, an obscure intellectual in The Third Policeman and The Dalkey Archive, appear in his own The Widow's Son. In both The Third Policeman and The Widow's Son, De Selby is the subject of long pseudo-scholarly footnotes. This is fitting, because O'Brien himself made free use of characters invented by other writers, claiming that there were too many fictional characters as is. O'Brien was also known for pulling the reader's leg by concocting elaborate conspiracy theories.

An award-winning radio play by Albrecht Behmel called Ist das Ihr Fahrrad, Mr. O'Brien? brought his life and work to the attention of a broader German audience in 2003.

In 2011 the '100 Myles: The International Flann O'Brien Centenary Conference' (24–27 July) was held at The Department of English Studies at the University of Vienna, the success of which led to the establishment of 'The International Flann O'Brien Society' (IFOBS). Each year the IFOBS announces awards for both books and articles about O'Brien. In October 2011, Trinity College Dublin hosted a weekend of events celebrating the centenary of his birth. A commemorative 55c stamp featuring a portrait of O'Brien's head as drawn by his brother Micheál Ó Nualláin was issued for the same occasion. This occurred some 52 years after the writer's famous criticism of the Irish postal service. A bronze sculpture of the writer stands outside the Palace Bar on Dublin's Fleet Street. Kevin Myers said, "Had Myles escaped he might have become a literary giant." Fintan O'Toole said of O'Brien "he could have been a celebrated national treasure – but he was far too radical for that."

O'Brien has also been semi-seriously referred to as a "scientific prophet" in relation to his writings on thermodynamics, quaternion theory and atomic theory.

In 2012, on the 101st anniversary of his birth, O'Brien was honoured with a commemorative Google Doodle.

In 2013, a bronze sculpture of O'Brien named "Myles after Myles", by the artist Holger Christian Lönze, was unveiled on Railway Street in Strabane.

His life and works were celebrated on BBC Radio 4's Great Lives in December 2017.

In The Guardian feature "My Hero", John Banville chose O'Brien, writing: "O’Brien was a philistine as well as a consummate prose stylist, an artist who threw away his talent, a Catholic who allowed himself to drift into the sin of despair, and a great comic sensibility thwarted and shrivelled by emotional self-denial. He would have laughed at the notion of being anybody’s hero."

The podcast Radio Myles by Toby Harris features interviews with notable scholars discussing O'Brien's works. The BBC radio show The Exploding Library dedicated an episode to The Third Policeman.

== List of principal works ==
=== Novels ===
- At Swim-Two-Birds (Longman Gren & Co. 1939)
- The Third Policeman (written 1939–1940, published posthumously by MacGibbon & Kee 1967)
- An Béal Bocht (credited to Myle na gCopaleen, published by An Preas Náisiúnta 1941, translated by Patrick C. Power as The Poor Mouth (1973)
- The Hard Life (MacGibbon & Kee 1961)
- The Dalkey Archive (MacGibbon & Kee 1964)
- Slattery's Sago Saga (seven chapters of an unfinished novel written circa 1964–1966, later published in the collections Stories and Plays, Hart-Davis, MacGibbon 1973, and The Short Fiction of Flann O'Brien, Dalkey Archive Press 2013, edited by Neil Murphy & Keith Hopper. It was also adapted as a play in 2010.
- The complete novels. Contains: At Swim-Two-Birds; The third policeman; The poor mouth; The hard life; The Dalkey archive (2007) ISBN 978-1-84159-309-8

=== Selected newspaper columns ===
The best-known newspaper column by O'Brien, "Cruiskeen Lawn", appeared regularly in the Irish Times between 1940 and 1966. The column was initially credited to Myles na gCopaleen, but from late 1952 onwards it was published under the name of Myles na Gopaleen. Selections from this column have appeared in four collections:

- The Best of Myles (MacGibbon & Kee 1968)
- Further Cuttings from Cruiskeen Lawn (Hart-Davis, MacGibbon 1976)
- The Hair of the Dogma (Hart-Davis 1977)
- Flann O'Brien at War: Myles na gCopaleen 1940–1945 (Duckworth 1999); also published as At War.

O'Brien also wrote a column, "Bones of Contention", which appeared under the name George Knowall in The Nationalist and Leinster Times of Carlow between 1960 and 1966. Selections have been published as

- Myles Away from Dublin (Granada 1985).

=== Other collections ===
- A Bash in the Tunnel (O'Brien's essay on James Joyce with this title appears in this book edited by John Ryan, published by Clifton Books 1970, alongside essays by Patrick Kavanagh, Samuel Beckett, Ulick O'Connor and Edna O'Brien).
- Stories and Plays (Hart-Davis, MacGibbon 1973), comprising Slattery's Sago Saga, "The Martyr's Crown", "John Duffy's Brother", "Faustus Kelly" and "A Bash in the Tunnel"
- The Various Lives of Keats and Chapman and The Brother, edited and introduced by Benedict Kiely, Hart-Davis, MacGibbon 1976, ISBN 0 246 10643 3
- Myles Before Myles (Granada 1985), a selection of writings by Brian O'Nolan from the 1930s.
- Rhapsody in St Stephen's Green (play, an adaptation of Pictures from the Insects' Life), (Lilliput Press 1994)
- The Short Fiction of Flann O'Brien, edited by Neil Murphy & Keith Hopper (Dalkey Archive Press 2013), including "John Duffy's Brother", "Drink and Time in Dublin" and "The Martyr's Crown"
- Plays & Teleplays, edited by Daniel Keith Jernigan, Dalkey Archive Press 2013, ISBN 978-1-56478-890-0

== Correspondence ==
- The Collected Letters of Flann O'Brien, edited by Maebh Long (Dalkey Archive Press 2018)

== Flann O'Brien studies ==
Since 2012 the International Flann O’Brien Society has published an open-access peer-reviewed journal, The Parish Review: Journal of Flann O'Brien Studies.
