= Hart-Davis, MacGibbon =

British publishing house

- Parent company: Granada
- Predecessor: Rupert Hart-Davis, MacGibbon & Kee
- Founded: 1972
- Successor: Collins
- Country of origin: United Kingdom
- Headquarters location: London
- Publication types: Books

Hart-Davis, MacGibbon is a British publishing house. It was formed in 1972 by its parent group, Granada. The parent company had acquired the publishing concern of Rupert Hart-Davis in 1963 and the house of MacGibbon & Kee (founded by James MacGibbon and Robert Kee) in 1968.

When Granada exited the publishing business in 1983, the imprint was sold to William Collins, Sons of Glasgow.
