= Carpenter's Gothic =

Book by William Gaddis

- First edition cover
- Author: William Gaddis
- Publisher: Viking
- Publication date: 1985

Carpenter's Gothic is the title of the third novel by American writer William Gaddis, published in 1985 by Viking. The title connotes a "Gothic" tale of haunted isolation, in a milieu stripped of all pretensions.

Gaddis's second-shortest novel, Carpenter's Gothic relates the words and occasional actions, in one house, of an ex-soldier, Confederate apologist, and pathological liar; his neglected and ineffectual wife; and a visitor with a mysterious past who resembles in many ways Gaddis himself. The book is notable mainly for its strict fugue-like nature, as each character pursues his own themes in conversation and in action, often without reference to anything said or done by the others.

== Reception and criticism ==
Writing for the Los Angeles Review of Books, Greg Gerke referred to the book as "[fitting] perfectly with the other three novels as one long scroll of words." Gerke refers to the other Gaddis books The Recognitions, J R, and A Frolic of His Own.

Cynthia Ozick reviewed the novel favorably in The New York Times, highlighting, among other things, Gaddis' ability to create different "voices" and his use of different dialogue. Ozick referred to the work as "...an unholy landmark of a novel - an extra turret added on to the ample, ingenious, audacious Gothic mansion William Gaddis has slowly been building in American letters."

=== The New York Times attribution ===
In a mention of the book, The New York Times credited the work to another American writer and novelist, William H. Gass. Gass wrote a humorous, though critical, letter to the editor about the mistake, and concluded by asking that the Times attribute John Hawkes' then-upcoming novel Adventures in the Alaskan Skin Trade to him as well.

== Quote ==
- "Finally realize you can't leave things better than you found them the best you can do is try not to leave them any worse . . ." (p. 230)
