= Sheri Martinelli =

American poet

- Born: Shirley Burns Brennan; January 17, 1918; Philadelphia, Pennsylvania
- Died: November 3, 1996 (aged 78)
- Known for: Painting, Poetry
- Movement: Beat Generation
- Spouse: Ezio Martinelli

Sheri Martinelli (January 17, 1918 – November 3, 1996) was an American painter, poet, and muse.

== Life ==
Martinelli was born Shirley Burns Brennan in Philadelphia in 1918. Of Irish ancestry, she was the eldest of four children and began using the name Sherry by the time she was a teenager. Later told that her first name had the wrong numerological value, she modified it to Sheri. The name Martinelli came by way of a brief early marriage to painter Ezio Martinelli, by whom she had a daughter Shelley (named after the poet) in 1943.

Sheri Martinelli was a protégée of Anaïs Nin and is described at length in Nin's famous Diary; she was the basis for Esme, a major character in William Gaddis’s novel The Recognitions, and then became the long-time muse and mistress of Ezra Pound in Washington, D.C. (she appears in various guises in the later Cantos); Charlie Parker and the members of the Modern Jazz Quartet hung out at her Greenwich Village apartment; Marlon Brando was an admirer and Rod Steiger collected her art, as did E. E. Cummings; she knew and was admired by many of the Beats - Ginsberg was an especially close friend and mentions her in one of his poems- and she was known in San Francisco in the late 1950s as Queen of the Beats; H.D. identified with her and wrote about her in End to Torment. She wrote unusual prose and poetry, much of it published in her own magazine, the Anagogic & Paideumic Review. She was one of the first to publish Bukowski, and her magazine was the very first to review his work.

In later years, she appeared under the pseudonym "Sheri Donatti" in Anatole Broyard’s Kafka Was the Rage, under her own name in David Markson’s novel Reader’s Block, and she was anthologized in Richard Peabody’s A Different Beat. When younger, she modeled frequently for Vogue and also appeared in one of Maya Deren’s experimental films.

She is perhaps best known as a companion of Ezra Pound during his years of incarceration at St. Elizabeths Hospital, where she is said to have inspired his Rock-Drill Cantos. Pound wrote the introduction to a book of her paintings, La Martinelli (1956); reviewing it in Gadfly, Guy Davenport wrote, "Miss Martinelli's painting is a record of evoked images, shapes thoroughly realistic but seen in the imagination only, . . . This little book, unlike the fortieth imitation of somebody's book on Picasso and available everywhere, is a discovery, pictures and commentary moving from an area of the mind now understandably suspect. . . ."

== Bibliography ==
- La Martinelli, Introduction by Ezra Pound. Milan: Vanni Scheiwiller, 1956.
- "Duties of a Lady Female." Anagogic & Paideumic Review 1.3 (1959). Rpt. in A Different Beat: Writings by Women of the Beat Generation, Ed. Richard Peabody. London and New York: Serpent’s Tail/High Risk, 1997. 154-58.
- “The Tao of Canto 90”, privately printed, 1960.
- "The Beggar Girl of Queretaro", Anagogic & Paideumic Review 1.4 (1960): 26-29.
- "Homage to Grandpa", Light Year, Autumn 1961. [2-page letter on Ezra Pound as lover]
- "Ruth Gildenberg." Measure 3 (June 1962): 23-25.
- [Letter to the editor.] Paideuma 6.3 (Winter 1977): 415-16.
- "Canto CVI", unpublished poem/commentary, dated December 6, 1984.
- "For Allen." in Best Minds: A Tribute to Allen Ginsberg, Ed. Bill Morgan and Bob Rosenthal, New York: Lospecchio P, 1986. 190.
- "A Memoir", Paideuma 15.2-3 (Fall-Winter 1986): 151-62.
- "Pound as Wuz", unpublished commentary on Laughlin, dated April 11, 1988.
- "Goodbye Anaïs", Anaïs: An International Journal 12 (1994): 77.
- "Mexico, His Thrust Renews.” Gargoyle no. 44 (December 2001): 9-18.
- Beerspit Night and Cursing: The Correspondence of Charles Bukowski and Sheri Martinelli, Ed. Steven Moore. Los Angeles: Black Sparrow Press, 2001.

== Pound/Martinelli Studies ==
- Davenport, Guy. “They Make Total War.” Gadfly, 1 May 1959, 19-22.
- Kindellan, Michael. “La Martinelli.” In his The Late Cantos of Ezra Pound: Composition, Revision, Publication. London: Bloomsbury Academic, 2017. 102-9.
- Marsh, Alec. “Sheri Martinelli: The White Goddess.” In The Edinburgh Companion to Ezra Pound and the Arts. Ed. Roxana Preda. Edinburgh: Edinburgh University Press, 2019. 463-76.
- ———. “Sheri Martinelli and the Paradise of Venus” and “Sheri Martinelli: Right-Wing Muse.” In his Ezra Pound’s Washington Cantos and the Struggle for Light. London: Bloomsbury Academic, 2021. 113-34, 135-48. (Appendix B reprints Martinelli’s “Homage to Grandpa.”)
- Moody, A. David. "La Martinelli." In his Ezra Pound, Poet: A Portrait of the Man and His Work. Volume III: The Tragic Years 1939-1972. Oxford: Oxford University Press, 2015. 311-18.
- Moore, Steven. “Sheri Martinelli: A Modernist Muse. Gargoyle 41 (Summer 1998): 29-54; expanded version in My Back Pages: Reviews and Essays (Los Angeles: Zerogram Press, 2017), esp. 544-56.
- Taylor, Richard. “Sheri Martinelli: Muse to Ezra Pound.” Agenda 38.1-2 (2001): 98-112.
- Vazquez-Amaral, José. “La Martinelli.” Rutgers Review 4.1 (Spring 1970): 19-21.
