= Jack Green (critic) =

American literary critic (born 1928)

jack green (the name was spelled with lower-case letters) is the pseudonym of Christopher Carlisle Reid (born 1928), an American literary critic who was a great defender of the work of William Gaddis. Reid—who took the name from a racing form after he quit his job to become a freelance critic—particularly admired Gaddis' 1955 novel The Recognitions, which flopped upon being published. Reid believed that the commercial failure of the hardcover edition of Gaddis' novel was the result of it having been panned by literary critics. Reid's faith in Gaddis was borne out when The Recognitions was chosen as one of TIME magazine's 100 best novels from 1923 to 2005.

(According to literary sleuth Don Foster, an English professor at Vassar College, jack green's name actually is John Carlisle. Carlisle was the son of novelist Helen Grace Carlisle and worked as an actuarial clerk at Metropolitan Life Insurance until 1957, when he quit his job.)

As jack green, Reid started a self-published mimeographed periodical called newspaper in 1957, in which Gaddis is a recurring topic. In the first issue, green claimed that The Recognitions was the greatest book of all time. Issue #10 (1960) consisted of a 32-page "quote-précis" of the novel, and in issues 12-14 he published Fire the bastards!, which fiercely denounced the literary critics who, he believed, doomed the novel with their bad reviews. In 1962, he also took out a full-page ad in The Village Voice heralding the paperback edition of The Recognitions (in which he again took a swipe at the critics). Many in the literary scene mistakenly thought "jack green" was a pseudonym for Gaddis himself, while others believed that Gaddis paid for Green's ad.

Green published seventeen issues of newspaper between 1957 and 1965. Though he published a few articles by others, most of the content was his, on a wide variety of topics. In 1979 he published a standalone newspaper no. 18.

In 1992, Dalkey Archive Press published Fire the Bastards! in book form, without green's knowledge or permission (because it was in the Public Domain), with an introduction by Gaddis scholar Steven Moore. Dalkey reissued it in paperback in 2012. The same year, a Spanish translation was published.

He was tangentially involved in the Wanda Tinasky letters imbroglio when one of the letters claimed that Gaddis and Thomas Pynchon were one and the same person. The Tinasky letters had been believed to be the work of Pynchon, but later were shown to be the work of poet Tom Hawkins by Dr. Don Foster, the Vassar English professor who unmasked Joe Klein as the author of Primary Colors.

In 1963, Hawkins self-published a paperback book that sold for $1 entitled Eve, the Common Muse of Henry Miller & Lawrence Durrell, that also addressed Gaddis and green. Hawkins insisted that Gaddis and green were the same person. In the Wanda Tinasky letters published in the 1980s, Hawkins continued to insist that Gaddis and green were one and the same, and also claimed that Gaddis/green had written the works of Pynchon. In 1986, Hawkins as Tinasky again claimed that jack green "...did pretty well in the auctorial line with novels published commercially under the names of William Gaddis and Thomas Pynchon." Foster proved that Hawkins, who was already dead, was Wanda Tinasky via textual analysis.

In addition to fire the bastards!, green wrote and self-published a number of pamphlets, including I'm Going Dancing with Lesly Lesby (1970?); Preliminary Edition (1982); and Snaps (1991), a mélange of book recommendations, “pithy remarks,” criticism of various media ranging from the New York Times to MTV, puns, opinions, jokes, and scenes from Greenwich Village life.

Green's newspaper continued to garner praise in later years. In 1992, novelist Gilbert Sorrentino called it “one of the authentic minor splendors of New York literary life in the late fifties and early sixties.” Steven Clay and Rodney Phillips devote a page to it in A Secret Location on the Lower East Side: Adventures in Writing, 1960-1980; describing it as “part conceptual art, part political tract, and part ’zine,” they write that Green “used his underground tabloid for cultural commentary and deliciously satirical (yet superbly well-documented) assaults against institutionalized publishing and book reviewing in America.” In his best-selling book The Black Swan, Nassim Nicholas Taleb offered Fire the Bastards! as an example of “clustering”: “Green shows clearly how book reviewers anchor on other reviews and reveals powerful mutual influence, even in their wording”—a phenomenon “reminiscent of the herding of financial analysts.”
