= Agapē Agape =

2002 novel by William Gaddis

- First edition
- Author: William Gaddis
- Language: English
- Publisher: Viking
- Publication date: 2002
- Publication place: United States
- Media type: Print (hardback & paperback)
- Pages: 128
- ISBN: 0-670-03131-3

Agapē Agape is a novel by William Gaddis. Published posthumously in 2002 by Viking with an afterword by Joseph Tabbi, Agapē Agape was Gaddis' fifth and final novel. It was published in Great Britain with the contents of The Rush for Second Place as Agapē Agape and Other Writings by Atlantic Books in 2004. The first word of the title is the Greek agapē, meaning divine, unconditional love.

== Synopsis ==
Agapē Agape is written in a paragraphless, monophonic style strongly reminiscent of that of Austrian writer Thomas Bernhard, who is referred to in the book itself. The novel lacks a plot, and is presented as the dialogic stream of consciousness of an ailing man surrounded by his own notes and papers as he makes digressions on various literary, historical, and philosophical subjects. A large portion of the book is dedicated to the history of the player piano, a subject Gaddis himself had shown interest in. The novel also examines Plato's theory of forms and Benjamin's "The Work of Art in the Age of Mechanical Reproduction".

== Reception ==
Gaddis's final novel was met with anticipation, as his last novel, A Frolic of His Own had won the 1994 National Book Award for Fiction. Upon release, the book was met with mostly positive reviews. In a rave review, Andrew Ervin wrote in the San Francisco Chronicle that Agapē Agape "is either the last true masterpiece of the 20th century or the first of our new millennium." In a mixed review in Entertainment Weekly, Troy Patterson called the novel a "plotless, posthumous 96-page spew of what we’re obliged to call 'postmodern thought.' "
