= Joel v Morison =

English tort case

- Court: Exchequer of Pleas
- Decided: 3 July 1834
- Citations: [1834] EWHC KB J39 172 ER 1338, (1834) 6 C & P 501

Joel v Morison [1834] EWHC KB J39 is a case in English tort law concerning the scope of vicarious liability of an employer for the acts of his employee.

== Facts ==
A contemporary map, showing a straightforward journey between the two endpoints (blue), and the place of the accident (red)

Joel was struck down by a horse and cart driven by Morison's agent. Joel was crossing Bishopsgate, a street in the City of London, but the driver's job was simply to travel between Burton Crescent Mews (in Belgravia) and Finchley. The driver had detoured to visit a friend when the accident occurred. Morison argued that he was not liable for Joel's injuries because the agent had strayed off his path.

== Judgment ==
Parke, B held:

"If he [the driver] was going out of his way, against his master's implied commands, when driving on his master's business, he will make his master liable; but if he was going on a frolic of his own, without being at all on his master's business, the master will not be liable."

The doctrine of respondeat superior meant the principal is liable for his agent's negligence only when the agent is acting at the time of the accident in the "course of his employment". Although the agent was doing Morison's business, he went, albeit momentarily, out of his way against his master's implied command. Morison was found liable.

== See also ==
- Tort law
- Labour law
- A Frolic of His Own, a novel by William Gaddis
