= How to Say No to a Rapist and Survive =

American 1975 book

- First edition
- Author: Frederic Storaska
- Language: English
- Published: 1975
- Publisher: Random House
- Publication place: United States
- Pages: 237
- ISBN: 9780394495798

How to Say No to a Rapist and Survive is a book by Frederic Storaska that was published by Random House in 1975.

The book, which stressed that potential victims try a variety of non-physical techniques such as feigning pregnancy, vomiting, and trying to outwit the attacker, received mixed reception. It was praised by The Sioux City Journal, praised it as "well-written and relevant reading", and complimented Storaska's emphasis on treating the rapist not as a monster but as a human being. Kirkus Reviews criticized the writing. Anatole Broyard of The New York Times Book Review wrote, "his common-sensical recommendations would seem to apply in any case".

Author Frederic Storaska was a prolific lecturer on the subject of rape prevention.

A film of the same title was released in 1975.

The author's qualifications and expertise were criticized in 1976. Fred Bruning of Newsday noted that Storaska was without credentials or publications in scholarly journals and found that a number of experts were skeptical of his views. The book and its author received additional attention when a woman who had seen the film followed its advice and was nearly raped.
