= The Rush for Second Place =

Posthumous essay collection by William Gaddis

- First edition
- Author: William Gaddis
- Language: English
- Publisher: Penguin Press
- Publication date: 2002
- Publication place: United States
- Media type: Print (Hardback & Paperback)
- Pages: 160
- ISBN: 0-14-200238-0

The Rush for Second Place is a posthumous collection of essays by William Gaddis. Edited and introduced by Joseph Tabbi, it was published in 2002 by Penguin Press at the same time as Gaddis's last novel, Agapē Agape. The contents were published in Great Britain with Agapē Agape as Agapē Agape and Other Writings by Atlantic Books in 2004.
