= Wanda Tinasky =

Pseudonym

Wanda Tinasky, ostensibly a bag lady living under a bridge in the Mendocino County area of Northern California, was the pseudonymous author of a series of playful, comic, and erudite letters sent to the Mendocino Commentary and the Anderson Valley Advertiser between 1983 and 1988. These letters were later collected and published as The Letters of Wanda Tinasky. In them, Tinasky weighs in on a variety of topics—most notably local artists, writers, poets, and politicians—with an irreverent wit and literate polish. The harshness of the attacks was deemed excessive by the Commentary early on, and, as a result, most of the remaining letters appeared in the AVA. At the time, the identity of Tinasky was completely unknown, and was subject to much local speculation. Tinasky was thought by many to be novelist Thomas Pynchon until it was demonstrated that Tinasky was likely an obscure Beat Generation poet named Tom Hawkins.

== Thomas Pynchon ==
In 1990, Bruce Anderson, the editor of the AVA, read Thomas Pynchon's Vineland, a novel set in northern California. Pynchon's style reminded Anderson of Tinasky, and Pynchon's notorious secrecy fueled speculation that he had been in the area during the 1980s. It occurred to Anderson that perhaps Pynchon was Tinasky. Indeed, Tinasky had written that she was writing a novel based on the local scene in Mendocino County.

Similarities (for example, both Tinasky and Pynchon worked for Boeing) were easy to play up, and discrepancies (for example, Tinasky worked for Boeing ten years before Pynchon) just as easy to play down. This pattern of finding significant matches between Pynchon and Tinasky, while ignoring apparent contradictions, continued in the readings that followed.

Anderson ran his speculations past some Pynchon fans, and received enough encouragement to report in the AVA that Pynchon was Tinasky. This announcement attracted little outside interest.

== The Letters of Wanda Tinasky ==
- In 1994, Fred Gardner started a "Best of AVA" project, came upon the Tinasky letters, and learned from Anderson the latter's belief that Pynchon wrote them. Gardner switched to working exclusively on a Tinasky letters project. Receiving a tip that TR Factor (the former Diane Kearney, who appeared in the AVA as "C. O. Jones") might actually be Tinasky, Gardner contacted Factor, and hired her as his assistant.
- In 1995, Gardner sent a letter to Pynchon's agent, Melanie Jackson (by then Pynchon's wife), in regard to the forthcoming publication of the Tinasky letters. Jackson wrote back that Pynchon did not write the letters, and that his name should not be associated with the project. The suggestion was made that Anderson was merely drumming up publicity for himself and the AVA. Gardner did not have as much zeal as Factor after this and quit the project.
- In 1996, Factor self-published The Letters of Wanda Tinasky with an introduction by literary critic Steven Moore guardedly supporting the identification of Pynchon with Tinasky, though, under legal duress, the book fell short of making an overt claim of authorship and did not put Pynchon's name on the cover. The Pynchon community remained largely undecided, and strong opinions formed on both sides, but the issue was mostly ignored. Pynchon Notes, an academic journal, did not review Tinasky.

== Don Foster ==
The situation changed in 1998 when Shakespeare scholar and "literary detective" Don Foster—who had gained publicity by correctly identifying Joe Klein as the author of Primary Colors—named an obscure Beat poet and writer, Tom Hawkins, as the author of the letters.

Foster's previous work was based on direct comparisons between unidentified and identified texts, looking for patterns in vocabulary, usage, and orthography. Foster's techniques have aroused some controversy, and his results have been mixed.

The Tinasky identification involved more direct detective work, with the crucial step involving computer searches for works written about writers mentioned in the Tinasky letters. Hawkins's name turned up, and Foster then tracked down more information about and writings by Hawkins. Eventually, many minor biographical details appeared, which exactly matched the letters: segments of Hawkins's poetry had been reused in the letters, and ultimately the very typewriter Hawkins used was found. Unlike the case with Pynchon, where there were both similarities and discrepancies throughout, the identified mismatches between Hawkins and Tinasky were limited to the Tinasky façade, and a small number of "transparent forgeries", as Foster calls them, that had been culled ahead of time.

In 2000, Foster published a popular account in his book Author Unknown. It has largely ended academic speculation on Tinasky's identity. Furthermore, several months after Foster's book came out, the Wanda Tinasky Letters page went blank without explanation, and the Letters soon went out of print.

== Tom Hawkins ==
Thomas Donald Hawkins (January 11, 1927 – September 23, 1988) was born in Pangurn, Arkansas. He grew up in Port Angeles, Washington, and graduated in 1950 from the University of Washington with a degree in English. He married Kathleen Marie Gallaner and worked for Boeing in the early fifties, then in Beaumont, Texas, in television, for station KFDM, and advertising. In 1960 he moved to San Francisco to join the Beats, supporting himself as a postal worker. After his work was rejected by local Beat publications, he took to self-publishing under the name "Tiger Tim" Hawkins. As a fan of William Gaddis, Hawkins discovered newspaper, the self-published Gaddis fansheet of "jack green". He became convinced that green was Gaddis, a detail that would show up in the Tinasky letters. Tinasky also claimed that "the novels of William Gaddis and Thomas Pynchon were written by the same person."

After Hawkins retired, he and Kathleen moved to Mendocino County just outside Fort Bragg, where they lived in poverty for most of the eighties. Hawkins engaged in petty scams and thefts and took to disguising himself. Kathleen came into an inheritance and bought a car for herself and a pickup truck for her husband. She also bought a kiln and began a promising career in pottery.

Three weeks after the last (according to Foster) authentic Tinasky letter, Hawkins bludgeoned Kathleen to death, and kept her body inside their house, unburied. After several days, he set fire to their house and drove her car off a cliff into rocky shoals, killing himself.

At the time, no one connected the end of Tinasky with the Hawkinses' murder–suicide. Indeed, this event didn't altogether stem the flow of Tinasky's invective: at least one "copycat" letter, by Foster's account, had been published while Hawkins was alive, and these continued to trickle out for a short time after his death.
