= Tom Hawkins (writer) =

American writer

Thomas Donald Hawkins (January 11, 1927 – September 23, 1988) was an American writer and murderer, and the probable author of the Wanda Tinasky letters, once widely thought to be the work of novelist Thomas Pynchon.

Hawkins graduated in 1950 from the University of Washington with a degree in English. He married Kathleen Marie Gallaner and worked for Boeing (as did Pynchon) in the early fifties, then in Beaumont, Texas in television, for station KFDM, and in advertising. In 1960, Hawkins moved to San Francisco to join the Beats, supporting himself as a postal worker.

After his work was rejected by local Beat publications, he took to self-publishing under the name "Tiger Tim" Hawkins. As a fan of William Gaddis, Hawkins discovered newspaper, the self-published Gaddis fansheet of "jack green". He became convinced that green was Gaddis, a detail that would show up in the Tinasky letters. Tinasky also claimed that "the novels of William Gaddis and Thomas Pynchon were written by the same person". After Hawkins retired, he and Kathleen moved to Mendocino County just outside Fort Bragg, where they lived in poverty for most of the 1980s. Hawkins engaged in petty scams and thefts, and took to disguising himself. Kathleen came into an inheritance and bought a car for herself and a pickup truck for her husband. She also bought a kiln, and began a promising career in pottery.

In September 1988 Hawkins killed first his wife, and then himself, in a murder-suicide.

== Early life ==
Hawkins was born in Pangburn, Arkansas and grew up in Port Angeles, Washington.

== The Letters of Wanda Tinasky ==
Wanda Tinasky, ostensibly a bag lady living under a bridge in the Mendocino County area of Northern California, was the pseudonymous author of a series of playful, comic and erudite letters sent to the Mendocino Commentary and Anderson Valley Advertiser (AVA) between 1983 and 1988. These letters were later collected and published as The Letters of Wanda Tinasky. In them, Tinasky weighs in on a variety of topics – most notably local artists, writers, poets and politicians – with an irreverent wit and literate polish at odds with her apparently straitened circumstances.

The harshness of the attacks was deemed excessive by the Commentary early on, and consequently most of the remaining letters appeared in the AVA. At the time, the identity of Tinasky was completely unknown, and subject to much local speculation. Tinasky was thought by many to be Thomas Pynchon, but is now widely believed to be Tom Hawkins.

== Murder–suicide ==
Three weeks after the last (according to Shakespeare scholar and "literary detective" Don Foster) authentic Wanda Tinasky letter, Tom Hawkins bludgeoned his wife Kathleen to death, and kept her body inside their house, unburied. After several days, he set fire to their house and drove her car off a cliff into rocky shoals, killing himself.

At the time, no one connected the end of Tinasky with the Hawkins' murder–suicide. Indeed, this event did not altogether stem the flow of Tinasky's invective: at least one "copycat" letter, by Foster's account, had been published while Hawkins was alive, and these continued to trickle out for a short time after his death.

== Investigation ==
Using textual analysis, Foster made a strong case that Hawkins was Wanda Tinasky from Hawkins' printed works.

From 1962 through 1964, Hawkins published Freak, a fanzine that he printed with a mimeograph machine under the aegis of his own Ahab Press.

In 1963, Hawkins (as "Tiger Tim Hawkins") self-published a paperback book that sold for US$1 entitled Eve, the Common Muse of Henry Miller & Lawrence Durrell, that also addressed Gaddis and green. Hawkins insisted that Gaddis and green were the same person. In the Tinasky letters, Hawkins continued to insist that Gaddis and green were one and the same, and also claimed that Gaddis/green had written the works of Pynchon. In 1986, Hawkins as Tinasky again claimed that jack green "...did pretty well in the auctorial line with novels published commercially under the names of William Gaddis & Thomas Pynchon."

Foster also came across a 1964 second edition of a polemic Hawkins (as "Tim Hawkins") had published against Paul Krassner, publisher of The Realist, entitled Paul Krassner, The Realist, & $crap: Plus a P.S. on it. The ampersand and the "P.S." were evocative of the Tinasky letters.

Foster's case for Hawkins being Wanda Tinasky was sealed when the person who had bought Hawkins' former home sent Foster correspondence, personal papers and news clippings she had found.

== Bibliography ==
- Eve, the Common Muse of Henry Miller & Lawrence Durrell (1963) (San Francisco: Ahab Press, 1963) (as Tiger Tim Hawkins)
- Paul Krassner, The Realist, & $crap (San Francisco: Ahab Press, 1963) (as Tim Hawkins) (1st Edition)
- Freak's Literary Tertiary (San Francisco: Ahab Press, 1964)
- On the Fairy Fag Doublet San Francisco: Ahab Press, 1963)
