= Frolic and detour =

Concept in the law of torts

Frolic and detour in the law of torts occur when an employee (or agent) makes a physical departure from the service of his employer (or principal). A detour occurs when an employee or agent makes a minor departure from his employer's charge whereas a frolic is a major departure when the employee is acting on his own and for his own benefit, rather than a minor sidetrack in the course of obeying an order from the employer.

The employer will be relieved of vicarious liability (which is usually assessed through the doctrine of respondeat superior for torts committed by the employee) only if the employee has been deemed to engage in a frolic.

Similarly, in the law of workers' compensation, an employer is not liable for injuries incurred by an employee during a frolic, but the employer can still face liability for the results of a detour.

The term was coined in Joel v Morison.

== Underlying rule of liability ==
An employer is vicariously liable for the unintentional torts of his employees. Similarly, a principal is liable for unintentional torts committed by an agent. This rule extends to partners in a partnership, who act as agents for one another, making each partner liable for unintentional torts committed by other partners while working for the benefit of the business. A frolic presents a situation that absolves employers, principals, and partners of this liability. A detour, comparatively, still allows a judge or jury to assess liability upon the employer, as the agent's/employee's actions will not be considered so far beyond the scope of employment as to absolve the employer/principal from liability without a factual assessment.

== What constitutes a frolic and a detour ==
To constitute a frolic or detour, the activity must be unrelated to the employer's business. However, in order for liability to be absolved, the employee must be engaged in a frolic, and not simply a detour (which may or may not result in absolution depending on additional circumstances). For example, when a delivery truck driver takes a longer route to the location he is supposed to deliver packages to because he wants to, say, see a new controversial billboard put up in town that has caused some public debate, he has merely taken a detour from his primary role as an employee/agent of the delivery company. Were he to negligently hit a pedestrian, his employer could likely still face the prospect of vicarious liability.

Conversely, if the same delivery truck driver decided to skip work for a few hours to catch a baseball game and, en route to the game he struck a pedestrian, his employer/principal would likely avoid liability, as the driver/employee/agent's actions have constituted a frolic, and his negligent actions occurred in furtherance of an act wholly separate from his employment, even though technically he is being paid during that time by his employer/principal.

Factors relevant to determining whether an individual was engaged in a frolic or detour in a specific circumstance include, but are not limited to the following:

1. Time (Consider the amount time taken for the departure and also if the departure is within the time frame during which the employee is employed)
2. Place: was the place where the incident occurred within the scope of the employee's employment?
3. Authorization: was the employee a manager and thus have more latitude in their operation, or was the employee occupying an entry-level position?
4. Foreseeability of the employee's departure.
5. Normalcy of the employee's departure.
6. Purpose: was the departure personally motivated or for the benefit of the employer?
7. Special obligation: was a special duty placed upon the employee such as a common carrier or innkeeper?
8. Common sense.
9. Scope of employment.

== Employer negligence compared ==
Determining whether an employee or agent was on a frolic or a detour will not relieve the employer/principal of their own liability for negligent entrustment. Thus, where an employer negligently permits an employee who is known to be a reckless driver, or should have been known with a basic amount of investigation that is reasonable for most employers to perform, to use a company vehicle the employer will be liable to those injured when the employee causes a car accident, even if the employee was on a frolic at the time.

== See also ==
- Joint and several liability
