= Fire the Bastards! =

Fire the Bastards! was written by Jack Green and published in his magazine newspaper in 1962. It was an acerbic critique of the book reviewing industry.

Green examined the initial 55 reviews that appeared in response to the publication of William Gaddis's 1955 debut novel, The Recognitions. He discovered that some reviewers either did not read or finish the work. Almost half of the reviews contained factual errors. Many employed the same clichés: "too difficult", "too long", "too negative", "ambitious", "a promising first novel." In one case he found that a critic had purloined part of his review from another review.

Fire the Bastards! appeared in book form in 1992. The publishers did not have the permission of the author to print the text. As the work had never been copyrighted, however, it was in the public domain and no permission was required for publication.
