= Kafka Was the Rage =

1993 book by Anatole Broyard

Kafka Was the Rage: A Greenwich Village Memoir
- Author: Anatole Broyard
- Subject: Memoir
- Publisher: Crown
- Publication date: 1993
- Pages: 160
- ISBN: 9780307757487

Kafka Was the Rage: A Greenwich Village Memoir is a 1993 book by American literary critic and New York Times writer Anatole Broyard. A memoir, Broyard discusses his time in Greenwich Village after serving in World War II, during which he ran a used bookstore and attended The New School. The book was published incomplete, as Broyard died of prostate cancer in 1990 before he could finish it. Broyard discusses his relationship with Sheri Donatti (an alias for Sheri Martinelli) and meeting famous writers and intellectuals, including Gregory Bateson, Erich Fromm, and Anaïs Nin.

In 2019, The New York Times named the book as one of the best memoirs of the last 50 years.

== Commentary and reviews ==
- Anderson, Sam (14 April 2008). "From Norman Mailer to Rem Koolhaas, 26 works of lapidary New Yorkitude". New York. 41 (13): 67–69.
- Carter, Greg (1 October 2012). "Anatole Broyard's Kafka Was the Rage: A Greenwich Village Memoir". Journal of American Ethnic History. 32 (1): 95–100. doi:10.5406/jamerethnhist.32.1.0095.
- Dickstein, Morris (31 October 1993). "Bohemian Rhapsody". The New York Times.
- Greenblatt, Leah (22 March 2025). "2 Books With Celebrity Cameos". The New York Times.
- Johnson, Joyce (26 December 1993). "His Own Manhattan". The Washington Post.
- Kaplan, Brett Ashley (September 2005). "Anatole Broyard's Human Stain: Performing Postracial Consciousness". Philip Roth Studies. 1 (2): 125–144. doi:10.1353/prs.2005.a386333.
- "Review of Kafka Was the Rage". Kirkus Reviews. 15 July 1993.
- London, Scott (1994). "Review of Kafka Was the Rage: A Greenwich Village Memoir". The Antioch Review. 52 (2): 365–366. ISSN 0003-5769.
- Moore, Steven (Spring 1994). "Anatole Broyard. Kafka Was the Rage" A Greenwich Village Memoir". Review of Contemporary Fiction. 14 (1): 241.
- "The 50 Best Memoirs of the Past 50 Years". The New York Times. 26 June 2019.
- O'Connell, John (2019). "55: Anatole Broyard, Kafka Was the Rage (1993)". Bowie's Bookshelf: The Hundred Books that Changed David Bowie's Life. New York: Gallery Books. ISBN 1982112549.
- "Review of Kafka Was the Rage: A Greenwich Village Memoir". Publishers Weekly. 240 (31): 68. 2 August 1993.
- Reynolds, Susan (3 October 1993). "NONFICTION - Oct. 3, 1993". Los Angeles Times.
- Wohlmann, Anita (2023). "Anatole Broyard: A Style for Being Ill; or, Metaphor 'Light'". Metaphor in Illness Writing: Fight and Battle Reused. Edinburgh: Edinburgh University Press. pp. 105–131. ISBN 1399500864.
