= Intoxicated by My Illness =

1992 book by Anatole Broyard

Intoxicated by My Illness: And Other Writings on Life and Death
- Author: Anatole Broyard
- Subject: Memoir
- Publisher: Clarkson N. Potter
- Publication date: 1992
- Pages: 135
- ISBN: 0-517-58216-3

Intoxicated by My Illness: And Other Writings on Life and Death is a 1992 book by American literary critic Anatole Broyard. Published after Broyard's death from prostate cancer in 1990, the memoir is a collection of six essays; half of them were written over the course of his career, while the other half were written post-diagnosis, in the last 14 months of his life. The book includes "What the Cystoscope Said", a 1954 short story about his father's own terminal illness, and The Patient Examines the Doctor, an original essay where Broyard discusses the doctor–patient relationship and advocates for compassion and humanity towards the patient, saying, "One who is not only a talented physician, but a bit of a metaphysician [...] able to go beyond science into the person [to] imagine the aloneness of the critically ill [...] I want him to be my Virgil, leading me through my purgatory or inferno, pointing out the sights as we go [...] To get to my body, my doctor has to get to my character. He has to go through my soul." Broyard's writings on illness are considered foundational texts in medical humanities and narrative medicine.

Neurologist Oliver Sacks wrote the book's foreword, while Broyard's wife Alexandra wrote the epilogue.

== Commentary and reviews ==
- Alpert, Joseph S. (18 November 1992). "Intoxicated by My Illness: And Other Writings on Life and Death". Journal of the American Medical Association. 268 (19): 2711. doi:10.1001/jama.1992.03490190115041.
- Barbre, Claude (1994). "Review of Intoxicated by My Illness". Journal of Religion and Health. 33 (3): 288–289. ISSN 0022-4197. JSTOR 27510831.
- Baugh, Steven (13 October 1993). "On the Edge of Being: When Doctors Confront Cancer". Journal of the American Medical Association. 270 (14): 1751. doi:10.1001/jama.1993.03510140113046.
- Braham, Jeanne (1994). "After the Losses". The Georgia Review. 48 (3): 601–609. ISSN 0016-8386. JSTOR 41400721.
- Florijn, B. W.; der Graaf, H. Van; Schoones, J. W.; Kaptein, A. A. (21 October 2019). "Narrative medicine: A comparison of terminal cancer patients' stories from a Dutch hospice with those of Anatole Broyard and Christopher Hitchens". Death Studies. 43 (9): 570–581. doi:10.1080/07481187.2018.1504350. hdl:1887/3627492. PMID 30265841.
- Frank, Arthur (30 May 1992). "In the shadow of death, they learned to live". The Globe and Mail. p. C.18.
- Goodrich, Chris (17 May 1992). "Nonfiction: Intoxicated by My Illness". Los Angeles Times. p. 6.
- Kennedy, Eugene (10 May 1992). "Writing His Way to the Finish". The New York Times.
- "Intoxicated by My Illness review". Kirkus Reviews. 1 March 1992.
- Major, William (2002). "Aesthetics and Social Critique in Anatole Broyard's "Intoxicated by My Illness"". Journal of Narrative Theory. 32 (1): 97–121. ISSN 1549-0815. JSTOR 30224578.
- Marget, Madeline (15 January 1993). "Tainted Elixir". Commonweal. 120 (1): 22–24.
- McQuade, Molly (July 1992). "Going in Style: Three writers face death head on". American Health. 11 (6): 100.
- Rodríguez-Prat, Andrea; Monforte-Royo, Cristina (January 2017). "25 years after Intoxicated by My Illness: Challenges for medical humanities". The Lancet. 389 (10066): 249–250. doi:10.1016/S0140-6736(17)30085-5. PMID 28118908.
- Rolland, John S (1996). "Review of Intoxicated by my illness: And other writings on life and death". Families, Systems and Health. 14 (4): 509–510. doi:10.1037/h0089977.
- Wohlmann, Anita (2023). "Anatole Broyard: A Style for Being Ill; or, Metaphor 'Light'". Metaphor in Illness Writing: Fight and Battle Reused. Edinburgh: Edinburgh University Press. pp. 105–131. ISBN 978-1399500869.
