= Laboratory NT2 =

Laboratory NT2 is a research group based in Quebec that hosts a database of more than 4,000 works of electronic literature with an emphasis on Francophone works. The full name is Laboratories de recherche sur les arts et les littératures numériques, or in English, the laboratory for research into digital arts and literatures.

== Background and philosophy ==
The NT2 is both a physical space, a research laboratory at UQAM, and a virtual space, the NT2 website, which is a hub for hypermedia literature and art. Their mission is to promote the study, understanding, creation, and archiving of new forms of hypermedia literature and art. Its main focus is the assessment and promotion of new expressions of cyberculture, as well as the development of novel strategies for ongoing research relating to new forms of art or text.

As such, the NT2 pursues three overarching research objectives:

1. To develop novel research methodologies in the arts and literature
2. To bear witness to the manifestations of cyberculture
3. To promote the research activities of the research community, Figura (Research Center on Texts and the Imaginary) and its Observatory of the Contemporary Imaginary (OIC).

Their main interests are hypermedia art (often known as Internet Art or net.art), new media and electronic literature. The archiving of these relatively new forms, thus allowing for long-term study, is central in the NT2's range of activities.

Through ongoing projects and collaborations NT2 focuses on promoting a community of interest and a network of researchers. This revolves around the study of contemporary imaginaries, and the exploration of novel research methodologies, adapted to contemporary contexts and technologies.

== Hypermedia Art and Literature (HAL) Directory ==
The NT2's main project has been the creation of the Hypermedia Art and Literature (HAL) Directory, which began in 2006. An index and showcase of hypermedia works, the database was created in response to the inadequacy of established tools of description for literature, cinema and art, as well as the lack of a substantial repertory for the institutionalization and collection of these new works.

The Directory was created using the open source content management system, Drupal. It is populated by hypertext and hypermedia literary and art works, with a particular emphasis on French language works. For each piece, an entry presents bibliographic information and a description of the work or site, including a classification based on the nature of the piece, its type of interactivity, and its general format. Certain cases also include research or technical notes and navigation screenshots.

The directory presents comprehensive reviews of each creative work. The HAL Directory lists works that have mainly been presented on the internet, as well as some available on CD-ROM, DVD-ROM, and, for older pieces, on diskette. In October 2015, the Directory included over 4,100 works, ranging from some closer to literature and others incorporating cinematographic, artistic and theatrical expression as well as animation, cartooning, graffiti, and video games.

According to an article written by Figura's director Bertrand Gervais in 2009, three main challenges that arose whilst developing the HAL Directory were:

1. Multidisciplinary: Since hypermedia works are formed from and inhabit the intersections between disciplines, and since a field of study dedicated to hypermedia literature and art does not yet exist, NT2 had to compile multidisciplinary teams to describe and organize the works in the database.
2. Location and Identification: Since there is no previously existing database of hypermedia works, NT2 had to develop new strategies for locating and identifying the works cataloged.
3. Specialized Description Protocols- Due to a lack of formalized vocabulary specific to hypermedia works, the HAL Directory is organized around a unique bibliographic system, employing hypermedia-specific vocabulary, and a set of key words based on the pieces themselves rather than on preexisting research taxonomies. The key words relating to interactivity, for example, include 39 options that aim to describe as accurately as possible, a user's experience with a particular work.

== Other activities and collaborations ==
- Revue bleuOrange - Online journal showcasing French-language and translated hypermedia literature works.
- Revue Captures - A peer-reviewed journal dedicated to the publication of articles, addressing the many facets of a contemporary imagination.
- Continuous series of colloquiums and panel discussion on hypermedia literature and art.
- The Consortium on Electronic Literature (CELL) is a networked edited resource with scholarly standards, consistent with "principles of the Open Access movement that seeks to maximize the free exchange of scholarly knowledge.", in collaboration with Electronic Literature Organization.
- Opuscules, a mobile application for Union des écrivaines et des écrivains québécois.
