= Consortium on Electronic Literature =

Group of databases documenting works of electronic literature

The Consortium on Electronic Literature (CELL)
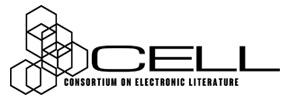
- Established: 2010 (16 years ago)
- Founders: Joseph Tabbi
- Founded at: Sydney
- Purpose: Cross-database collaboration in the field of electronic literature
- Fields: Electronic literature
- Website: cellproject.net

The Consortium on Electronic Literature (CELL) is an international collaboration between databases that document works of electronic literature, that is, literary works that use digital modalities like interactivity or animation. CELL develops shared metadata standards and a website, CELL: The Index, aimed at allowing a single search to locate records in any of the collaborating databases. Members include the Electronic Literature Organization's Electronic Literature directory, the French-Canadian database NT2, the Electronic Literature Lab as well as databases covering electronic literature in Portugal, the Netherlands, Germany and Spain.

== Background ==
CELL documents works of electronic literature, that is literary works that are created for digital media and that are often published online. Examples span from Strachey's 1952 love letter generator, to Jhave Johnston's ReRites, a work of generative literature that used GPT-2, to Shelley Jackson's hypertext fiction Patchwork Girl (1985) to interactive stories using video and touchscreens such as Samantha Gorman and Danny Cannizarro's Pry (2014).

There is a well-developed system for keeping track of print literature, but it does not fit most electronic literature because it is not usually published by a traditional publisher or catalogued in library databases. When a new novel is published it is given an ISBN and information about the book and its author are recorded in catalogues like VIAF as well as in library catalogs around the world. However, works of electronic literature are often published in small online journals or on their own websites, so they are typically not included in these established systems for tracking literary works. This has made it difficult for scholars and ordinary readers to find works they are interested in, and it has made preservation and analysis difficult.

To solve this, a number of different initiatives have been developed to document and archive works of electronic literature. However, most are of limited scope or limited to works in a single country or language. CELL was founded to develop a more robust framework for collaboration between these initiatives.

== Establishment and first metadata standards ==
CELL was founded in 2010 by the Electronic Literature Organization. The first meeting was held in Sydney in 2010, and included representatives from the ELMCIP Knowledge Base for Electronic Literature at the University of Bergen, the Electronic Literature Organization, the Australian project "Creative nation: writers and writing in the new media arts" (later ADELTA), and the Germany Media Upheavals project. At a followup meeting at the following year the Brown University digital archive, Po.Ex (the Digital Archive of Portuguese Experimental Poetry), and the Quebec-based database Laboratory NT2 were also represented. Other partners who joined the CELL consortium included the Electronic Literature Lab, a lab at Washington State University in Vancouver, USA, that has a library of older works of electronic literature with the vintage computers needed to access them.

NT2 coordinated the technical development of the initial search tool, and discussions were held on a shared metadata standard and shared taxonomy was developed that would work for all partners. in 2013, "The CELL Metadata Element Set: A Standard Representation for Creative Works of Electronic Literature" was prepared for CELL by Celeste Lantz and Sandy Baldwin at the Center for Literary Computing at West Virginia University in 2013. It formalised a controlled vocabulary for metadata about works of electronic literature that would be shared by all the CELL partners, which allowed information to be shared between databases.

== Wikidata and The CELL Index ==
In 2023, after a period of less activity in CELL, the Center for Digital Narrative at the University of Bergen began working on The CELL Index, a technical solution for interoperability between Wikidata and the active partners in CELL. The previous solutions allowed for interoperability between individual databases, but in times with less resources it is difficult to maintain and does not make the data visible to other fields. Using Wikidata as a hub means that each record in the different databases will also exist as a Wikidata item. Different types of metadata about each work of electronic literature, such as the author, date of publication, language and so on, are matched to Wikidata properties.

The CELL Index is a Wikibase instance that stores verified records about electronic literature, and dynamically displays data from Wikidata for additional context. Each partner database still runs on its own platform and with its own priorities, but every work and author that has a record in any of the partnering databases will also have a record on the CELL Index with links to more information in the individual databases and in Wikidata.

== Partners ==
=== First generation of partners ===
The first generation of partners (from around 2010) included the following groups:

- the Electronic Literature Directory (Electronic Literature Organization)
- ADELTA: The Australian Directory of Electronic Literature and Text-Based Art (previously the Creative Nation database) at the University of Western Sydney
- ELMCIP (University of Bergen)
- Po.Ex (Fernando Pessoa University)
- NT2 (Université du Québec à Montréal)
- Electronic Book Review
- University of Siegen
- Brown University’s Digital Arts Directory
- I ♥ E-Poetry, University of Puerto Rico

Several of these databases are no longer active, or are archived but no longer adding new records.

Other collaborators over the years include The NEXT and the Electronic Literature Lab.

=== CELL partners in 2025 ===
Active partners in CELL as of 2025
Partner	Institutional host	Scope of database
ADEL (Archiv der deutschsprachigen elektronischen Literatur)	The Archiv der deutschsprachigen elektronischen Literatur (ADEL) documents the development of electronic literature in Germany, Austria, and Switzerland.	Electronic literature in Germany, Austria, and Switzerland
Digitale Literatuur Databank	The Digital Literature Consortium at Tilburg University	Dutch and Flemish digital literature
Ciberia Project	The LEETHI research group (European Literatures from Text to Hypermedia) at the Complutense University of Madrid	Electronic literature works in Spanish
Electronic Literature Directory (ELD)	Electronic Literature Organization	Electronic literature in general, with. Both a repository of works and a critical companion to e-literature with definitions of key terms.
The ELMCIP Electronic Literature Knowledge Base	Center for Digital Narrative at the University of Bergen	Electronic literature in general, with entries for works, authors, events and more.
Po.EX (Digital Archive of Portuguese Experimental Literature)	Universidade Fernando Pessoa	Portuguese experimental poetry, including concrete, visual, digital and sound poems.
