= William Gaddis =

American novelist (1922–1998)

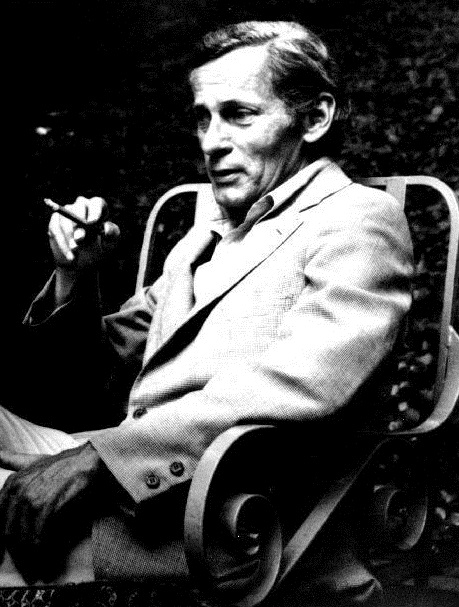
- Gaddis in 1975
- Born: William Thomas Gaddis Jr. December 29, 1922; New York City, US
- Died: December 16, 1998 (aged 75); East Hampton, New York, US
- Education: Harvard University
- Spouses: Patricia Black; Judith Thompson
- Children: 2
- Writing career
- Period: 1955–1998
- Genre: Novel
- Notable works: The Recognitions (1955); J R (1975); A Frolic of His Own (1994)
- Notable awards: National Book Award
- Literary movement: Postmodernism

William Thomas Gaddis Jr. (December 29, 1922 – December 16, 1998) was an American novelist. The first and longest of his five novels, The Recognitions, was named one of TIME magazine's 100 best novels from 1923 to 2005 and two others, J R and A Frolic of His Own, won the annual U.S. National Book Award for Fiction. A collection of his essays was published posthumously as The Rush for Second Place (2002). The Letters of William Gaddis was published by Dalkey Archive Press in February 2013.

A MacArthur Fellow, Gaddis is widely considered one of the first and most important American postmodern writers.

== Life and career ==
Gaddis was born in New York City to William Thomas Gaddis, who worked "on Wall Street and in politics", and Edith (Charles) Gaddis, who worked her way up from being secretary to the president of the New York Steam Corporation to an executive position as its chief purchasing agent. When he was three, his parents separated and Gaddis was subsequently raised by his mother in Massapequa, Long Island. At age 5 he was sent to Merricourt Boarding School in Berlin, Connecticut. He continued in private school until the eighth grade, after which he returned to Long Island to receive his diploma at Farmingdale High School in 1941. He entered Harvard in 1941 where he was a member of The Harvard Lampoon (where he eventually served as president), but was asked to leave in 1944 due to an altercation with police. He worked as a fact checker for The New Yorker for little over a year (late February 1945 until late April 1946), then spent five years traveling in Mexico, Central America, Spain, France, England, and North Africa, returning to the United States in 1951.

His first novel, The Recognitions, appeared in 1955. A lengthy, complex, and allusive work, it had to wait to find its audience. Newspaper reviewers considered it overly intellectual, overwritten, and disgusting. Seven years later, the book was defended by Jack Green in a series of broadsheets blasting the critics; the series was collected later under the title Fire the Bastards!.

Gaddis then turned to public relations work and the making of documentary films to support himself and his family. In this role he worked for Pfizer, Eastman Kodak, IBM, and the United States Army, among others. He also received a National Institute of Arts and Letters grant, a Rockefeller grant, and two National Endowment for the Arts grants, all of which helped him write his second novel. In 1975 he published J R, told almost entirely in unattributed dialogue. Its eponymous protagonist, an 11-year-old, learns enough about the stock market from a class field trip to build a financial empire of his own. Critical opinion had caught up with him, and the book won the National Book Award for Fiction.

Carpenter's Gothic (1985) offered a shorter and more accessible picture of Gaddis's sardonic worldview, focusing on religious fundamentalism and apocalyptic thinking. Instead of struggling against misanthropy (as in The Recognitions) or reluctantly giving ground to it (as in J R), Carpenter's Gothic wallows in it. The continual litigation that was a theme in that book becomes the central theme and plot device in A Frolic of His Own (1994)—which earned him his second National Book Award and was a finalist for the National Book Critics Circle Award for Fiction.

Gaddis died at home in East Hampton, New York, of prostate cancer on December 16, 1998, but not before creating his final work, Agapē Agape (the first word of the title is the Greek agapē, meaning divine, unconditional love), which was published in 2002, a novella in the form of the last words of a character similar but not identical to his creator. The Rush for Second Place, published at the same time, collected most of Gaddis's previously published nonfiction.

== Family life ==
In May 1955 Gaddis eloped with Patsy Thompson Black (1928–2000), a model and actress who had come to New York from North Carolina to break into theater. They had two children: Sarah (b. September 1955)—who wrote a novel, Swallow Hard (1991), inspired by her relationship with her father—and Matthew (b. January 1958). Their marriage ended in divorce in 1965. In 1968 Gaddis married Judith Thompson (1940–2022), a journalist and later an antiques dealer. They separated in 1978, and the following year he reunited with Muriel Murphy Oxenberg (1926–2008), whom he had first met in 1953. They lived together until around the time when A Frolic of His Own was published (1994), which is dedicated to her. Gaddis lived alone for the remaining roughly four years of his life.

== Legacy and influence ==
Among fans of post-modern fiction, Gaddis is often acknowledged as being one of the greatest of American post-war novelists. A critic who early on appreciated his work and recognized its value is Steven Moore: in 1982 he published A Reader's Guide to William Gaddis's "The Recognitions" and in 1989 a monograph on Gaddis in the Twayne series. Gaddis's influence is vast (although frequently subterranean): for example, postmodern authors such as Don DeLillo and Thomas Pynchon seem to have been influenced by Gaddis (indeed, upon publication of V., Pynchon was actually speculated to have been a pen name for Gaddis due to the similarity of styles and the dearth of information about the two authors; the Wanda Tinasky letters also claimed that Gaddis, Pynchon, and Jack Green were the same person), as well as authors such as Joseph McElroy, William Gass, David Markson, and David Foster Wallace, who have all stated their admiration for Gaddis in general and The Recognitions in particular.

Jonathan Franzen, who in an essay in The New Yorker called Gaddis "an old literary hero of mine", dubbed him 'Mr. Difficult', stating that "by a comfortable margin, the most difficult book I ever voluntarily read in its entirety was Gaddis' nine-hundred-and-fifty-six-page first novel, The Recognitions." Franzen continued: "In the four decades following the publication of The Recognitions, Gaddis's work grew angrier and angrier. It's a signature paradox of literary postmodernism: the writer whose least angry work was written first."

Characters in fiction based on Gaddis include Harry Lees in Chandler Brossard's 1952 novel Who Walk in Darkness, Harold Sand in Jack Kerouac's autobiographical 1958 novella The Subterraneans and possibly Bill Gray in Don DeLillo's 1991 novel Mao II. (DeLillo was a friend of Gaddis.) The characters Richard Whitehurst in Kurt Wenzel's Lit Life: A Novel (2001) and Joshua Gel in Stephen Dixon's I: A Novel (2002) likely are based on Gaddis. Other authors who allude to Gaddis in their books include Jonathan Franzen (The Corrections), David Markson (Epitaph for a Tramp), Joseph McElroy (A Smuggler's Bible) and Stanley Elkin (The Magic Kingdom).

His life and work are the subject of a comprehensive website, The Gaddis Annotations, which has been noted in at least one academic journal as a superior example of scholarship using new media resources. Gaddis's papers are collected at Washington University in St. Louis. The first book-length biography, Joseph Tabbi's Nobody Grew but the Business: On the Life and Work of William Gaddis, was published by Northwestern University Press in May 2015. The Electronic Book Review held a special edition examining Gaddis work on the 25th anniversary of his death.

His works have been translated into a number of foreign languages, including French, German, Spanish, Italian, Polish, Portuguese, Swedish, Chinese, Turkish, Ukrainian, Japanese, and Russian.

== Awards and honors ==
Beside the awards for particular works, Gaddis received three other awards and honors:

- The MacArthur Foundation’s "Genius Award" (1982);
- Election to the American Academy and Institute of Arts and Letters (1989);
- The Lannan Literary Award for Lifetime Achievement (1993).

== Works ==
=== Fiction ===
- The Recognitions (1955)
- J R (1975)
- Carpenter's Gothic (1985)
- A Frolic of His Own (1994)
- Agapē Agape (completed 1998, published 2002)

=== Non-fiction ===
- The Rush for Second Place (collection, published 2002)

=== Short fiction and excerpts ===
| Title | Publication | Collected in |
|---|---|---|
| "Le Chemin des Anes" | New World Writing 1 (1952) | from The Recognitions |
| "J.R. or The Boy Inside" | The Dutton Review 1 (1970) | from JR |
| "Untitled Fragment from Another Damned, Thick, Square Book" | Antaeus 13/14 (Spring-Summer 1974) | from JR |
| "Nobody Grew But the Business" | Harper's (June 1975) | from JR |
| "Szyrk v. Village of Tatamount et al. in the United States District Court, Southern District of Virginia, No. 105-87" | The New Yorker (October 12, 1987) | from A Frolic of His Own |
| "Jake's Dog" | The Missouri Review 27.2 (Fall 2004) | - |
| "The Rehearsal" | The Missouri Review 27.2 (Fall 2004) | - |
| "A Father Is Arrested" | The Missouri Review 27.2 (Fall 2004) | - |
| "In Dreams I Kiss Your Hand, Madam" | Ninth Letter 4.2 (Fall-Winter 2007) | from The Recognitions |

== See also ==
- List of novelists from the United States
