= Chandler Brossard =

American novelist

Brossard c. 1988

Chandler Brossard (July 18, 1922 – August 29, 1993) was an American novelist, writer, editor, and teacher. With a challenging style and outsider characters, Brossard had limited critical success in the United States. His novels were more appreciated in France and Great Britain.

His early works have been described as "landmarks of the postwar American novel." Since 2000, three of his novels have been reprinted.

== Early life and education ==
Brossard was born in Idaho Falls, Idaho, and had brothers Vincent and Boyd and a sister Adele. Both their mother Therese and father were from educated Mormon elite and upper-middle-class families who were major landowners in the area. After the parents separated, Brossard's mother struggled to support the family. The family moved to Washington, D.C., where Brossard grew up. He dropped out of school at the age of 11 and was chiefly self-educated. He suffered from migraines starting in childhood.

== Career ==
Brossard started as a copy boy at The Washington Post at the age of 18, and began writing as a reporter.

He moved to New York and at the age of 19 was hired by The New Yorker. The editor William Shawn encouraged him to write fiction, and Brossard became a writer and editor. He wrote or edited a total of 17 books, both novels and non-fiction.

During his career, Brossard worked for several magazines: he went on to become a senior editor for Time magazine, managing editor at Coronet, executive editor for The American Mercury, and senior editor for Look magazine (1956–67). He also wrote criticism for The Nation, Commentary, and The Guardian.

From 1969 to 1971, Brossard was a professor at the newly founded Old Westbury College on Long Island. He later held teaching appointments as a visiting professor, writer-in-residence, or lecturer at other universities both in the United States and abroad, including the University of Birmingham in England, The New School for Social Research in New York, Schiller College in Paris, the University of California at Riverside, and San Diego State University.

== Literary career ==
Brossard's first novel, Who Walk in Darkness (1952), portrayed the bohemian life of the late 1940s Greenwich Village; it was first published by Gallimard in France. It is sometimes called the first beat novel. Through it, Brossard became associated with early Beat Generation writers such as Jack Kerouac and Allen Ginsberg, but he believed that he was on a different path. He said that reviewers who characterized Who Walk in Darkness as a beat novel:

...totally missed getting the book. They thought it was a realistic novel, which of course it wasn't. The French critics knew better. They perceived it as the first 'new wave' novel, a nightmare presented as flat documentary.

More recently, the novel has been characterized as existential, closer to works such as Ernest Hemingway's The Sun Also Rises (1926) and Albert Camus' L'Étranger (1942).

Brossard wrote four plays, all produced in St. Louis, Missouri, in the 1960s. He published three novels under the pseudonym Daniel Harper (see below).

After his first novel, Brossard received little critical recognition for his fiction in the United States, as he had "an unconventional style and characters." In his later works, the critic Steven Moore describes his narrators as seeming "possessed by a variety of voices". Brossard tended to write about characters who were outsiders: "thieves, chimney sweeps, harlots, counterculture activists..." and used the idiomatic language of mostly spoken voice. He has been described as underappreciated in his home country, as his works were considered difficult; they were better received abroad, particularly in France.

In 1971, Anatole Broyard, the book reviewer of The New York Times, wrote a scathing review of Wake Up. We're Almost There, saying of it: "Here's a book so transcendentally bad it makes us fear not only for the condition of the novel in this country, but for the country itself." Brossard responded in kind. The two men, former friends in the 1940s, had a continuing conflict.

Henry Louis Gates Jr. has attributed the conflict to an earlier falling out over Brossard's "unflattering portrayal" of Broyard as the hipster character Henry Porter in his 1952 novel. Brossard described Porter as a Negro "passing" for white. Broyard was a mixed-race Creole who lived as white in New York. Having seen the galleys, he forced Brossard to change the description of Porter before the novel was published in the U.S.

After 1973, Brossard's fiction was published only by small presses, such as Cherry Valley, Realities Library, and Redbeck Press. Dalkey Archive Press published his final full-length novel, As the Wolf Howls at My Door, in 1992.

A special 1987 issue of the Review of Contemporary Fiction, guest edited by Steven Moore, was devoted to a critical examination of his work. In interviews with Moore in 1985, Brossard said of his work:

I think they can all be understood in a deeply religious sense. I think the thing that is continuous in this writing of mine is this almost blind religious innocence, of the religious innocent. Now the religious innocent is an inextricable part of religious literature throughout the ages....The believer who believes in miracles persists in going on. In none of my work has the innocent voice lost its innocence. It may be covered with blood, but it has never become a cynical, pessimistic voice.

His shorter fiction from 1971 to 1991 was collected and published posthumously by Sun Dog Press under the title Over the Rainbow? Hardly: Collected Short Seizures (2005). Brossard had chosen the title shortly before his death. The Greek-British writer Alexis Lykiard described Who Walk In Darkness (1952), The Bold Saboteurs (1953) and The Double View (1960) as "landmarks of the postwar American novel". Since 2000, Brossard's first two novels have been reprinted with new introductions by Steven Moore (see below).

== Marriage and family ==
He first married Sally Ciccarelli and had two daughters: Iris Brossard, an accomplished poet and writer, and Marie Brossard. Brossard later married Maria Ewing Huffman. Their daughter Genève Brossard, born in 1977, later became an arts teacher and professional boxer. He and Maria divorced in the late 1980s.

He died of cancer in New York in August 1993. His daughter Iris wrote an account of his final days. Brossard's papers are held by Syracuse University.

== Works ==
=== Novels ===
- Who Walk in Darkness (1952; reprint 2000, with introduction by Steven Moore)
- The Bold Saboteurs (1953; reprint 2001, with introduction by Steven Moore)
- All Passion Spent (1954)
- The Wrong Turn (1954), under the pseudonym Daniel Harper
- The Double View (1960; reprint 2022 as The Double Dealers, with introduction by Zachary Tanner and afterword by Iris Brossard)
- The Girls in Rome (1961)
- Episode with Erika (1963)
- A Man for All Women (1966)
- Wake Up. We're Almost There (1971; reprint 2020, with introduction by Zachary Tanner)
- Did Christ Make Love? (1973; reprint 2021 as The Wolf Leaps, with introduction by Zachary Tanner and foreword by Steven Moore)
- Dirty Books for Little Folks (1978)
- Raging Joys, Sublime Violations (1981; reprint 2020, with introduction by Rick Harsch)
- A Chimney Sweep Comes Clean (1985)
- Closing the Gap (1987)
- As the Wolf Howls at My Door (1992; reprint 2021, with introduction by Zachary Tanner)

=== Short stories ===
- The Beat Generation and the Angry Young Men (1958): contributions by Kingsley Amis, Anatole Broyard, Jack Kerouac, etc., includes "Redemption" by Chandler Brossard
- Over the Rainbow? Hardly: Collected Short Seizures (2005)

=== Non-fiction ===
- The Insane World of Adolf Hitler (1966), biography
- The Spanish Scene (1968), vignettes

=== Anthologies ===
- The Scene Before You: A New Approach to American Culture (1955), 24 essays on aspects of sex and science, movies and Greenwich Village
- The First Time (1957), short stories collection—as are all the following:
- Desire in the Suburbs (1962)
- The Pangs of Love: Stories of the Young (1962)
- The Nymphets (1963), under the pseudonym Daniel Harper
- 18 Best Stories of Edgar Allan Poe (1965), nominally co-edited by Vincent Price
- Wives and Lovers (1965)
- Love Me, Love Me! (1966)
- Marriage Games (1967)
- I Want More of This (1967)
- In Other Beds (1968)
