= The Recognitions =

Novel by William Gaddis

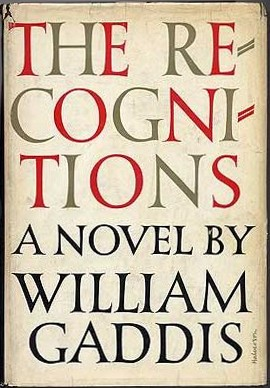
- First edition
- Author: William Gaddis
- Language: English
- Genre: Postmodern literature
- Publisher: Harcourt Brace & Company
- Publication date: 1955
- Publication place: United States
- Media type: Print (hardback & paperback)
- Pages: 956

The Recognitions is the 1955 debut novel of American author William Gaddis. The novel was initially poorly received by critics. After Gaddis won a National Book Award in 1975 for his second novel, J R, his first work gradually received new and belated recognition as a masterpiece of American literature.

In 2005, Time included The Recognitions in its list of "100 Best English-language Novels from 1923 to 2005".

== Plot summary ==
The story follows the life of Wyatt Gwyon, son of a Calvinist minister from rural New England; his mother dies in Spain. He plans to follow his father into the ministry. But he is inspired to become a painter by The Seven Deadly Sins, Hieronymous Bosch's noted painting which his father owned. Gwyon leaves New England and travels to Europe to study painting. Discouraged by a corrupt critic and frustrated with his career, he moves to New York City.

He meets Recktall Brown, a capitalistic collector and dealer of art, who makes a Faustian deal with him. Gwyon is to produce paintings in the style of 15th-century Flemish and Dutch masters (such as Bosch, Hugo van der Goes, and Hans Memling) and forge their signatures. Brown will sell them as newly discovered originals. Gwyon becomes discouraged and returns home to find that his father has converted to Mithraism and is preaching his new ideas to his congregation, whilst steadily losing his mind. Back in New York, Gwyon tries to expose his forgeries. He travels to Spain where he visits the monastery where his mother was buried, works at restoring old paintings, and tries to find himself in a search for authenticity. At the end, he moves on to live his life "deliberately".

Interwoven in the three parts of the book (and an unnumbered epilogue) are the tales of many other characters, among them Otto, a struggling writer; Esme, a muse; and Stanley, a musician. The epilogue follows Stanley's adventures further. He achieves his goal to play his work on the organ of the church of Fenestrula "pulling all the stops". The church collapses, killing him, yet "most of his work was recovered ..., and is still spoken of, when it is noted, with high regard, though seldom played."

The major part of the novel takes part in the late 1940s and early 1950s.

== Background ==
Gaddis worked on The Recognitions for seven years. He began it as a much shorter work, intended as an explicit parody of Goethe's Faust. During the period in which Gaddis was writing the novel, he traveled to Mexico, Central America, and Europe. While in Spain in 1948, Gaddis read James Frazer's The Golden Bough. Gaddis found the title for his novel in The Golden Bough, as Frazer noted that Goethe's plot for Faust was derived from the Clementine Recognitions, a third-century theological tract: Clement of Rome's Recognitions was the first Christian novel; and yet it was a work that posed as one having been written by a disciple of St. Peter. Thus an original work posed as something else, and was in some sense a fraud that became a source for the Faust legend.

From this point, Gaddis began to expand his work as a full novel. He completed it in 1949. Evidence from Gaddis' collected letters indicates that he revised, expanded and worked to complete the draft almost continuously up to early 1954, when he submitted it to Harcourt Brace as a 480,000-word manuscript.

According to Steven Moore, the character of Esme was inspired by Sheri Martinelli and Otto was a self-deprecating portrait of the author. "Dick", a minister, is a reference to Richard Nixon.

== Style ==
Gaddis intended his complex novel, full of characters whose lives intertwine, to be challenging. He said later:

I do ask something of the reader and many reviewers say I ask too much ... and as I say, it's not reader-friendly. Though I think it is, and I think the reader gets satisfaction out of participating in, collaborating, if you will, with the writer, so that it ends up being between the reader and the page. ... Why did we invent the printing press? Why do we, why are we literate? Because the pleasure of being all alone, with a book, is one of the greatest pleasures.

In 2002 writer Jonathan Franzen said that this novel was, "by a comfortable margin, the most difficult book I ever voluntarily read."

The book has three parts and is organized like a triptych: each part contains many larger and smaller scenes, all interconnected. The themes of forgery, falsification, plagiarism, and mistaken identity abound. Gaddis creates numerous and lengthy dialogues. Like James Joyce, he uses an em-dash to mark the beginning of speech, not standard quotation marks. He leaves it up to the reader to deduce who is talking by the speaking style, other behavior or attributes of the speaker, or the context. Some characters change their names in the course of the novel; thus, Wyatt Gwyon is called so in the beginning of the novel, then loses his name, only to be given at the end—fraudulently—the name of Stephan Asche, a Swiss national. Gaddis is a master of cumulative syntax, enriching his sentences by literary, cultural and religious allusions.

== Reception ==
The book was poorly received upon publication. Years later, Jack Green (Christopher Carlisle Reid) examined the initial 55 reviews in his essay "Fire the Bastards!" He critiqued the reviewers, saying,

Two of 55 reviews were adequate, the others were amateurish and incompetent, failing to recognize the greatness of the book, failing to convey to the reader what the book is like, what its essential qualities are, counterfeiting this with stereotyped preconceptions — the standard cliches about a book that is "ambitious," "erudite", "long," "negative," etc., counterfeiting competence with inhuman jargon.

Gaddis appeared to take critics to task in the novel. When a critic is asked if he is reading a book, which is described as of the size, price, and appearance of The Recognitions, he says:

No. I'm just reviewing it...A lousy twenty-five bucks. It'll take me the whole evening tonight. You didn't buy it, did you? Christ, at that price? Who the hell do they think's going to pay that much just for a novel. Christ, I could have given it to you, all I need is the jacket blurb to write the review.

Green noted that the jacket blurb was repeated in some reviews.

Over time, the work gradually became recognized for its significance. David Madden observed that "(a)n underground reputation has kept it on the brink of oblivion." Tony Tanner said that it inaugurated a new period in American fiction, foreshadowing and sometimes directly influencing the work of later ambitious novelists such as Joseph McElroy, Thomas Pynchon, Don DeLillo, and David Foster Wallace.

Franzen compared the novel to a "huge landscape painting of modern New York, peopled with hundreds of doomed but energetic little figures, executed on wood panels by Brueghel or Bosch." He believed that its disappointing reception negatively affected Gaddis's future development as a novelist. Gaddis did not publish another novel for 20 years.

Writer Cynthia Ozick said in 1985 that "The Recognitions is always spoken of as the most overlooked important work of the last several literary generations...Through the famous obscurity of The Recognitions, Mr. Gaddis has become famous for not being famous enough."

== Publication history ==
Dalkey Archive Press sold the publication rights to the novel to New York Review Books in 2020.
