= Mark Amerika =

American artist (born 1960)

- Born: 1960 (age 65–66); Miami, Florida, U.S.
- Education: Brown University
- Known for: Video art, Net art, novels, sound art, media theory, remix
- Notable work: GRAMMATRON 1997 PHON:E:ME 1999; FILMTEXT 2001-2; Immobilité 2009; Museum of Glitch Aesthetics 2012 Crapshoot 2015

Mark Amerika (born 1960, Miami, Florida) is an American visual artist, theorist, novelist and College Professor of Distinction at the University of University of Colorado. He is a graduate of the Literary Arts program at Brown University, where he received his MFA in creative writing in 1997.

Amerika's work has been exhibited internationally. In 2000, his net art work GRAMMATRON was selected for the Whitney Biennial. Other exhibitions of his work have taken place in the Denver Art Museum, the Institute of Contemporary Arts in London, and the Walker Art Center. In 2009–2010, The National Museum of Contemporary Art in Athens, Greece, hosted Amerika's comprehensive retrospective exhibition entitled UNREALTIME. In 2009, Amerika released Immobilité, generally considered the first feature-length art film shot on a mobile phone. He is the author of many books, including The Kafka Chronicles, Sexual Blood, META/DATA: A Digital Poetics and remixthebook.

Amerika is the publisher of the Alt-X Online Network, a website of online art, literature and new media theory that he began as a Gopher site in late 1992. The site includes the Alt-X e-book press, early versions of the electronic book review, Alt-X Audio, the Hyper-X net art gallery, and interviews with both mainstream and alternative literary writers from the late 20th century. His Avant Pop Manifesto was first released on Alt-X in 1993.

Amerika's artwork "Museum of Glitch Aesthetics" was commissioned by the Abandon Normal Devices Festival in conjunction with the London 2012 Olympics. The project was part of his survey exhibition Glitch. Click. Thunk at the University Art Galleries at the University of Hawaii.

In late 2013, he was the Labex Arts-H2H International Research Chair at the University of Paris 8. Prior appointments include Visiting International Professor at the Royal Melbourne Institute of Technology, the Honors Program at the National University of Singapore, University of Technology Sydney, and Falmouth University.

Amerika published Locus Solus (An Inappropriate Translation Composed in a 21st Century Manner) with Counterpath Press in 2014. The work is described as an "auto-translation / remix" of the French novel Locus Solus published by author Raymond Roussel one hundred years earlier in 1914. According to the book's afterword, Amerika, who does not read or write in French, composed the work using online translation programs.

In 2015, Amerika was appointed the founding director of a new doctoral program in Intermedia Art, Writing and Performance in the College of Media, Communication and Information at the University of Colorado. In 2017, Amerika was the first artist to be appointed a professor of distinction at the University of Colorado.
