= Electronic Book Review =

- Discipline: Culture, Literature, Technology
- Language: English
- Edited by: Joseph Tabbi

Publication details
- History: 1995–present
- Frequency: Monthly
- Open access: Yes

Standard abbreviations
- ISO 4: Electron. Book Rev.

Indexing
- ISSN: 1553-1139
- OCLC no.: 38577076

Links
- Journal homepage

Electronic Book Review (ebr) is a peer-reviewed scholarly journal with emphasis on the digital. Founded in 1995 by Joseph Tabbi and Mark Amerika, the journal was one of the first to devote a lasting web presence to the discussion of literature, theory, criticism, and the arts.

== Overview ==
Since its inception, ebr has highlighted works characterized by innovation, resistance to genre, and creative use of emerging (electronic and web-specific) media. In 1996, Details referred to the journal as "a new mecca for cutting-edge fiction and criticism." Initially managed in DIY fashion by contributing writers and programmers, by 1997 Anne Burdick joined the staff as design director, later bringing on Ewan Branda for the redesign. Writing in Deep Sites: Intelligent Innovation in Contemporary Web Design, Max Bruinsma characterizes ebr as "an interesting web of critical debates on electronic textuality, cyberculture, and the value of digital design literacy for scholarship and critical writing on the web." Its emphasis on the materiality of text extended to early experiments with form on the site itself, including "glosses," in which comments by a guest curator appear embedded in existing articles, and the "weave" function, which allowed for fluid rearrangement of content "like a virtual loom that weaves different patterns each time you choose a different perspective."

ebr has received institutional support or affiliation from University of Illinois at Chicago, The Center for Literary Computing at West Virginia University, University of Colorado at Boulder, the Department of English, Art Center College of Design at Pasadena, University of Stavanger, the Electronic Literature Organization, and the Consortium on Electronic Literature (CELL). ebr is currently edited by Joseph Tabbi, among other scholars, critics, and artists on its Executive Board, including Anna Nacher (since 2023), Will Luers (since 2017), and Lai-Tze Fan (since 2017).

== Books and collaboration ==
In conjunction with a trilogy of essay collections from MIT Press, ebr published a thread reproducing a portion of the essays while also expanding, critiquing, and responding to the print content. The "First Person" thread exists as an accompaniment to the collections First Person: New Media as Story, Performance, and Game, Second Person: Role-Playing and Story in Games and Playable Media, and Third Person: Authoring and Exploring Vast Narratives by Pat Harrigan and Noah Wardrip-Fruin.

== See also ==
- Electronic literature
- Hypertext fiction
- Postmodernism
- Posthumanism
- Digital humanities
