= Donald Wayne Foster =

Professor of English at Vassar College in New York

Donald Wayne Foster (born 1950) is a retired professor of English at Vassar College in New York. He is known for his work dealing with various issues of Shakespearean authorship through textual analysis. He has also applied these techniques in attempting to uncover mysterious authors of some high-profile contemporary texts. As several of these were in the context of criminal investigations, Foster was sometimes labeled a "forensic linguist". He has been inactive in this arena, however, since Condé Nast settled a defamation lawsuit brought against one of his publications for an undisclosed sum in 2007.

== Shakespearean scholarship ==
Foster first achieved notice for addressing the mystery of the dedication of Shakespeare's sonnets. In the edition published by Thomas Thorpe, a dedication appears to "Mr. W.H." as the "onlie begetter" of the sonnets, and the identity of W.H. has aroused much speculation over the years. While in graduate school at the University of California, Santa Barbara, Foster formulated a theory that it was a typographical error. Though not the first to articulate the possibility, his article appeared in the Publication of the Modern Language Association in 1987, after he joined the Vassar faculty. Foster argued that the initials were meant to read either "W.S." or "W.SH." for Shakespeare himself, the dedication presumably having been written by Thorpe. Foster pointed to Shakespeare's initials being similarly abbreviated in other documents, as well as contemporaneous publications that misspelled authors' initials in the error-filled manuscripts of the time.

While pursuing his research into these initials, Foster came across another work that led him to believe he had identified a previously unknown Shakespeare piece. This was a 1612 poem, A Funerall Elegye in memory of the late Vertuous Maister William Peeter, and would have been the first new Shakespeare identification in over a century. Thorpe, the publisher of the sonnets, had registered this work with the London Stationers, giving the author's initials as "W.S.".

Relying on the internal evidence of the text, Foster argued that Shakespeare could be the author and submitted a manuscript about the Elegy to Oxford University Press, but two experts recommended against publication on the grounds that such evidence was insufficient to establish authorship. Foster was not given their names, following normal practice for peer review, although he later related that he was able to identify the reviewers based on the language of their reports. The book was published instead by the University of Delaware Press in 1989.

Initially Foster did not claim that his identification was definitive, but in 1995 another Shakespeare scholar, Richard Abrams of the University of Southern Maine, published an article strengthening Foster's claims of the Elegy's Shakespearean authorship. Foster then claimed publicly that the Elegy "belongs hereafter with Shakespeare's poems and plays" and gained international media attention. He supported his identification with computer analysis based on a database he called SHAXICON, used to compare the poem's word choice with that of Shakespeare and his contemporaries. The Elegy was subsequently included in some editions of Shakespeare's complete works, though with qualifications, and it was never considered to be of great quality.

After considerable debate, Foster's theory was eventually rejected by other Shakespeare scholars. In 2002, Gilles Monsarrat, a translator of Shakespeare into French, published an article arguing that the poem's true author was John Ford, a younger writer whose works Monsarrat had also edited. Foster conceded that Monsarrat had the better case in a post on the SHAKSPER listserv, saying, "No one who cannot rejoice in the discovery of his own mistakes deserves to be called a scholar." Foster said he had not previously analyzed Ford's works closely enough and had erroneously dismissed him as a possibility.

== Literary analysis in contemporary cases ==
Meanwhile, the publicity surrounding Foster's analytical skills led to him being called upon to track down the authors of various anonymous and pseudonymous texts. Using a mixture of traditional scholarship and computers to perform textual comparisons, Foster looked for unique and unusual usage patterns. Computer-based statistical techniques for textual analysis had been used by historians before Foster, most notably with the Federalist Papers. As Foster has pointed out, however, such methods are not definitive: "The notion has been perpetuated that there's a computer program that can identify authorship, and there isn't".

In 1996, Foster was one of the people who helped reveal Joe Klein as the author of the "anonymous" bestseller Primary Colors. Foster named Klein in an article for New York magazine, following the lead of a former Clinton speechwriter, David Kusnet, who had fingered Klein in the Baltimore Sun a few weeks earlier. Klein objected, partly because the theories cited similarities between the book and Klein's writings on racial issues, and he disliked the way his attitude was being characterized. The matter subsided after additional revelations forced Klein to acknowledge that he wrote the book.

In some instances, Foster has raised arguments challenging whether the person traditionally identified as the author of a text was correct. He has pointed to an obscure Beat writer, Tom Hawkins, as the author of the Wanda Tinasky letters, which some had previously speculated to be the work of Thomas Pynchon. Foster also joined a long-running effort by descendants of Henry Livingston Jr. to show that their ancestor, and not Clement Clarke Moore, wrote the famous poem A Visit from St. Nicholas.

Foster provided his account of sleuthing out these and other identifications in his book Author Unknown (including the Shakespeare-Elegy connection, which he still supported at the time). The chapters on Shakespeare and Klein were praised as particularly lively, although the rest of the book was considered less substantial. One reviewer suggested that he spent too much time on the personal character of the writers he analyzed, such as Klein's alleged "issues" with blacks and women, or Moore's support for slavery. The reviewer still found Foster's arguments about authorship, based on the textual analysis of their writing styles, convincing.

== Assistance to criminal investigations ==
On several occasions, Foster has participated in criminal cases that required literary analysis. He was brought into the case of Theodore Kaczynski to compare the Unabomber Manifesto with other examples of Kaczynski's writing. Originally approached by defense attorneys hoping that he might rebut an FBI analysis and the identification of the writing by Kaczynski's brother, Foster ultimately concluded that the evidence of authorship was even stronger than the FBI was claiming.

=== Ramsey murder case ===
In 1997, Foster became involved in the investigation of JonBenét Ramsey's murder, a case in which a ransom note played a significant role.

In his 2000 book on the case, Detective Steve Thomas wrote: "I finally heard the magic words while seated in the book-lined office of Don Foster, an Elizabethan scholar and professor at Vassar College in upstate New York, who just happened to be a hell of a linguistic detective. 'Steve,' said Foster, 'I believe I am going to conclude the ransom note was the work of a single individual: Patsy Ramsey.'"

Thomas described Foster's presentation to the Boulder authorities in March 1998: "'In my opinion, it is not possible that any individual except Patsy Ramsey wrote the ransom note,' he told a special briefing in Boulder, adding that she had been unassisted in writing it. With his sterling academic reputation and a track record of 152-0 in deciphering anonymous writings, this should have been a thunderbolt of evidence, but the DA's office, without telling us, had already discredited and discarded the professor. His coming to Boulder was a big waste of time."

From a book by FBI profiler John Douglas, also written in 2000: "In 1998, Foster announced he had determined that Patsy Ramsey had written the ransom note, which sounded pretty compelling coming from such an established expert, and (Detective) Steve Thomas has written that he placed great weight on Foster's analysis. But then it came out that in the Spring of 1997, he had written to Patsy Ramsey at the Charlevoix, Michigan house to offer his condolences, encouragement and the statement, "I know you are innocent - know it, absolutely and unequivocally. I will stake my personal reputation on it.""

And from a book by Andrew Hodges: "Based on his comparison of Patsy's handwriting with the ransom note, Foster told Hunter that Patsy Ramsey had written the letter. But Foster, as it turned out, had badly compromised himself as an expert witness when, early in the case, he had spontaneously written to Patsy to tell her that his initial opinion was that she was innocent. Not long after that, Foster had also staked his reputation that an internet personality by the name of Jameson was really John Andrew (John Ramsey's son), and that he felt John Andrew was behind the murder. These two factors came to light later after Foster had changed his mind and decided Patsy had written the note. But by then, the damage was done, essentially rendering useless Foster's 100 page report on the ransom note."

=== Anthrax case ===
Foster returned to advise the FBI during the investigation of the 2001 anthrax attacks. He later wrote an article for Vanity Fair about his investigation of Steven Hatfill, a virologist who had been labeled a "person of interest" by Attorney General John Ashcroft. In an October 2003 article for Vanity Fair, Foster tried to match up Hatfill's travels with the postmarks on the anthrax letters, and analyzed old interviews and an unpublished novel by Hatfill about a bioterrorist attack on the United States. Hatfill was identified as a possible culprit. The Reader's Digest published a condensed version of the article in December 2003. The perpetrator of the anthrax attacks turned out to be another government bio-weapons scientist.

Hatfill subsequently sued Donald Foster, Condé Nast Publications, Vassar College, and The Reader's Digest Association, seeking $10 million in damages, claiming defamation. The case was settled by Condé Nast in 2007 for an undisclosed amount. Foster ceased any public discussion of the case.

== Bibliography ==
- Elegy by W.S.: A Study in Attribution (1989). ISBN 0-87413-335-1
- Author Unknown: On the Trail of Anonymous (2000). ISBN 0-8050-6357-9
