= J R =

1975 novel by William Gaddis

- First edition
- Author: William Gaddis
- Language: English
- Publisher: Alfred A. Knopf
- Publication date: October 12, 1975
- Publication place: United States
- Media type: Print (hardback & paperback)
- Pages: 726
- ISBN: 0-39-449550-0
- OCLC: 28271816
- Dewey Decimal: 813/.54 20
- LC Class: PS3557.A28 J2 1993

J R is a novel by William Gaddis published by Alfred A. Knopf in 1975. It tells the story of a schoolboy secretly amassing a fortune in penny stocks. J R won the National Book Award for Fiction in 1976. It was Gaddis's first novel since the 1955 publication of The Recognitions.

To complete the novel, Gaddis received a grant from the Rockefeller Foundation.

== Synopsis ==
J R Vansant is an 11-year-old schoolboy who obscures his identity through payphone calls and postal money orders in order to parlay penny stock holdings into a fortune on paper. The novel broadly satirizes what Gaddis called "the American dream turned inside out". One critic called it "the greatest satirical novel in American literature." Novelist Louis Auchincloss thought it "worthy of Swift."

== Literary analysis ==
The writing style of J R is intended to mimic Gaddis's view of contemporary society: "a chaos of disconnections, a blizzard of noise." The novel is told almost entirely in dialogue, and there is often little indication (other than conversational context) of which character is speaking. (Gaddis later said he did this in order to make the reader a collaborator in the process of creating the characters.) There are also no chapters, with transitions between scenes occurring by way of shifts in focalization: for example, a character who is in a meeting may leave the meeting, get in his car, and drive off, passing another character, who becomes the subject of the next scene without any break in the continuity of the narration (though the novel is written in a discontinuous or fragmentary tone). The novel is thus broken only into French scenes (or perhaps "French chapters"). Gaddis later advised the reader not to put too much effort into figuring out each word but to read the novel at a normal talking speed; "it was the flow that I wanted," he said, "for the readers to read and be swept along—to participate. And enjoy it. And occasionally chuckle, laugh along the way."

This chaotic writing style may, some critics argue, reflect Gaddis's preoccupation with entropy and with the 20th century's rejection of Newtonian physics, the narrative style thus reflecting a quantum and Heisenbergian world of "waste, flux and chaos." In this world, the characters who devise complex systems to acquire as much material wealth as possible are founding their lives on illusion because matter is impermanent and because, as Gaddis himself wrote in an essay, "the more complex the message, the greater the chance for error. Entropy rears as a central preoccupation of our time." In J R, entropy manifests itself as "a malign and centrifugal force of cosmic disruption at work scattering everything in [people's] heads, homes and work"

One of the epicenters of entropy is a seedy, run-down tenement apartment on East 96th Street (Manhattan). The apartment is stacked floor to ceiling with useless goods J R has acquired at bargain prices; a blaring radio, blocked by those boxes, cannot be turned off; the faucets, always running, threaten to flood the apartment (and indeed later drown a cat); characters flit in and out on useless errands; and the clock runs backwards. One critic compares the craziness of this locale to a Marx Brothers film and finds it superior. Gaddis lived in a tenement on E. 96 St. and probably based the fictional apartment in part on his unpleasant experiences there.

Gaddis's real-life experiences figure in other locales as well. Much of the novel takes place in a desolate, nightmarish version of Massapequa, New York, and features a ludicrously dysfunctional school board. Gaddis, who in real life spent many years in Massapequa and had much of his property seized (using eminent domain) by the school board there, said, half in jest, that he "wrote J R in revenge against Massapequa." One of the most memorable characters in the novel is fired by that school board for independent thinking. He is Mr Bast, J R's music teacher. Bast is a young composer employed casually by the school. Bast is drawn into assisting J R and becomes a critical link for the development of the business empire J R assembles. When Bast starts at the school his ambition is to write an opera. As the novel develops he is increasingly burdened by the business accumulations J R makes and his musical ambitions are sidelined. Bast's ambitions slide from opera to symphony, then to sonata and by the end of the novel he aspires to compose a suite. The responsibilities that come from being involved with the childish shenanigans of corporate takeovers and asset stripping has had a corrosive effect on Bast's capacity to create art. Indeed, the corrosive effect of today's messy, noisy society on everyone's capacity to create and appreciate art is a major theme of this novel—and, arguably, of all of Gaddis's novels. (Gaddis later qualified this by stating that when Bast and his fellow-artists Eigen and Gibbs abandon their dreams, this is due in part to their own self-destructive nature; and when, in the last scenes, Bast begins work on a humble cello piece, it represents a "real note of hope".)

== "JR Goes to Washington" (1987) ==
Years later, Gaddis wrote the title character "J R" into a piece of political satire, which the New York Times published in 1987. "Trickle-Up Economics: JR Goes to Washington" is written as the transcript of a U.S. congressional hearing on the federal budget, and J R is an official at the Office of Management and Budget.

== See also ==
- Jonathan Lebed
