= Joseph Tabbi =

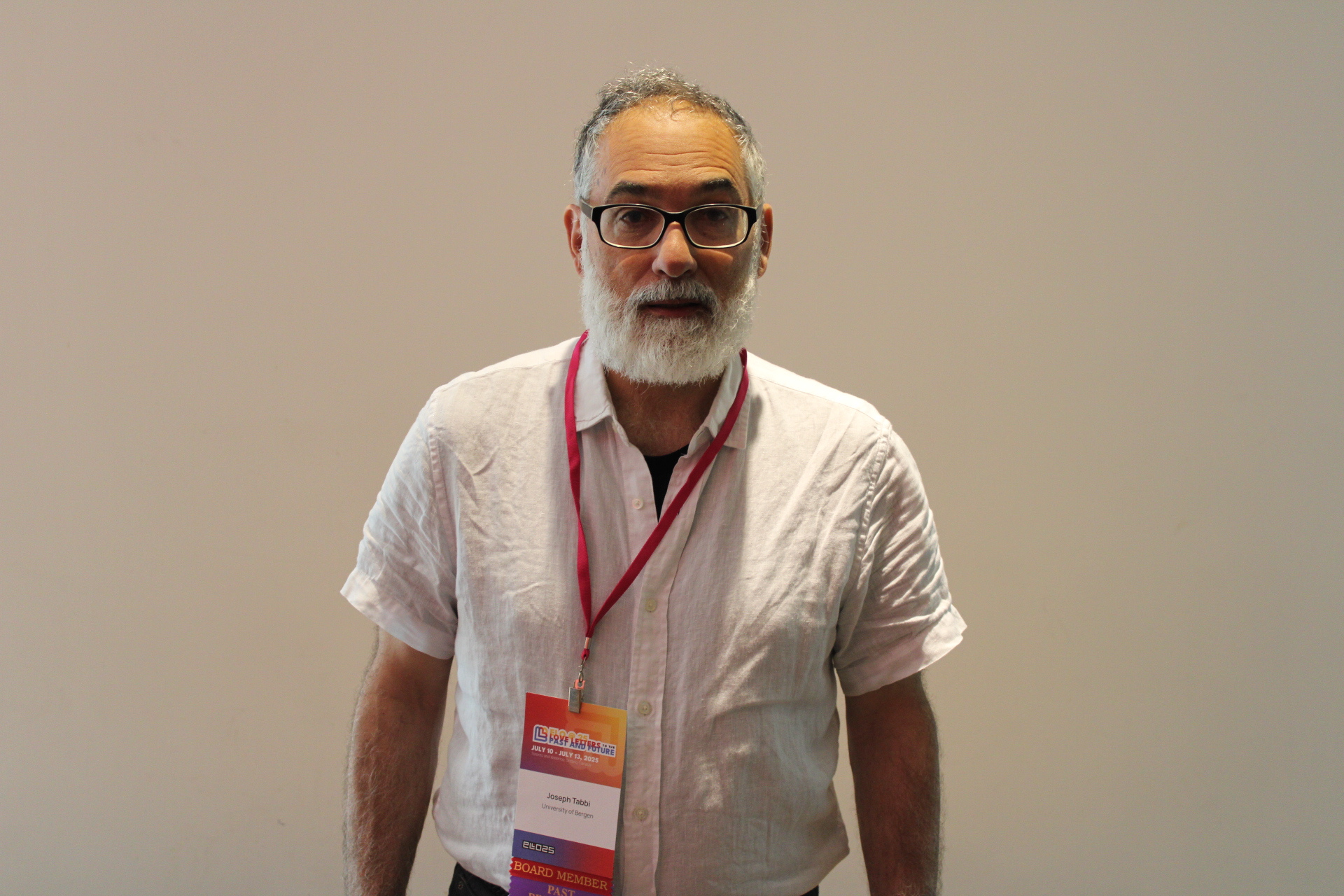
- Joseph Tabbi photographed at the conference ELO 2025: Love Letters to the Past and Future in Toronto, Canada 2025-7-12
- Born: 4 May 1960, 1960

Academic background
- Education: Cornell University

Joseph Tabbi (born 1960) is a US scholar and theorist, notable for his contributions to the fields of American literature and electronic literature, and as the editor in chief of Electronic Book Review for over 30 years. Tabbi retired from his position as full professor at the University of Bergen in 2026, and is now a professor emeritus. He was previously a professor of American literature at the University of Illinois Chicago.

== Academic career ==
Tabbi received a Ph.D. from the University of Toronto in 1989 for a dissertation titled "The Psychology of Machines: Technology and Personal Identity in the Work of Norman Mailer and Thomas Pynchon." Tabbi joined the faculty of the University of Illinois Chicago, and then in 2019 he moved to the University of Bergen to take a position as Professor of English Literature. In 2023 he became one of the Principal Investigators of the Center for Digital Narrative.

He was the first scholar granted access to the archives of the reclusive novelist William Gaddis, and is the author of Nobody Grew but the Business: On the Life and Work of William Gaddis and the editor of The Bloomsbury Handbook of Electronic Literature (2017) and Post-Digital: Critical Debates from electronic book review (2020). His other works include Cognitive Fictions (2002) and Postmodern Sublime: Technology and American Writing from Mailer to Cyberpunk (1996). In 2024 he published The Cambridge Introduction to Literary Posthumanism.

Tabbi edits the scholarly journal Electronic Book Review (ebr), which he founded with Mark Amerika. Tabbi is also the founder of Consortium on Electronic Literature (CELL), an "open access, non-commercial resource offering centralized access to literary databases, archives, and institutional programs" in the humanities.

== Selected works ==
- Tabbi, Joseph (2024). The Cambridge introduction to literary posthumanism. Cambridge University Press. ISBN 978-1-009-25645-2. Wikidata Q132168995.
- Tabbi, Joseph (1996). Postmodern Sublime: Technology and American Writing from Mailer to Cyberpunk. Cornell University Press. ISBN 978-0-8014-8383-7. Wikidata Q124646197.
- Tabbi, Joseph (2002). Cognitive fictions. University of Minnesota Press. ISBN 978-0-8166-3556-6. LCCN 2001006518. OCLC 237796412. OL 3939482M. Wikidata Q124646252.
- Joseph Tabbi (2015). Nobody grew but the business: on the life and work of William Gaddis. ISBN 978-0-8101-3142-2. LCCN 2014050148. OCLC 898158764. OL 27182942M. Wikidata Q124646253.

== Edited books ==
- Reading Matters: Narrative in the New Media Ecology (Cornell University Press,1997) (with Michael Wutz) ISBN 9780801484032
- Paper Empire: William Gaddis and the World System (University of Alabama Press, 2007) (with Rone Shavers et al.) ISBN 9780817354060
- The Bloomsbury Handbook of Electronic Literature (2017)
- Post-Digital: Critical Debates from electronic book review (2019)
