= A Frolic of His Own =

1994 novel by William Gaddis

- First edition cover
- Author: William Gaddis
- Language: English
- Genre: Novel
- Published: 1994 (Poseidon Press)
- Publication place: United States
- Media type: Print (hardback & paperback)
- Pages: 592 pages (hard); 512 pages (paper)
- ISBN: 0-671-66984-2
- OCLC: 28505092
- Dewey Decimal: 813/.54 20
- LC Class: PS3557.A28 F76 1994

A Frolic of His Own is a book by William Gaddis, published by Poseidon Press in 1994. It was his fourth and final novel published during his lifetime. It won his second U.S. National Book Award for Fiction.

== Title ==
The title is from a judicial decision about vicarious liability in Joel v. Morison.

== Plot ==
Justice? – You get justice in the next world, in this world you have the law.

— A Frolic of His Own, Opening line

Oscar Crease is hospitalized after a car accident. He had short-circuited the ignition of his car while standing in front of it, and the driverless car then drove over him. His stepsister Christina and her lawyer husband Harry Lutz visit him and bring him the legal opinion prepared by his father, a circuit judge, concerning the case of Szyrk v. the Village of Tatamount et al. This case concerns a situation where a dog became entrapped by a steel sculpture created by Mr. Szyrk. To free the dog a destructive procedure has to be performed on the sculpture, but the sculptor tries to prevent this and is granted a preliminary injunction by the judge.

Back at home in the Hamptons, Oscar is recovering. He is trying to build a legal case against the movie producer Constantine Kiester and his associates who he asserts have infringed upon his copyright of his unpublished play. Both the play and the movie describe an event during the Civil War, where Oscar's grandfather, later to be a judge on the Holmes court, hired two substitutes to fight for him, one for the South, the other for the North. At the battle of Antietam they meet, fight and kill each other.

Oscar engages a lawyer, Harold Basie, and reads pieces of his script to show him similarities, although he had not seen the movie. Basie takes the case, while the defendants happen to use Harry Lutz's legal firm to represent them. A deposition is taken and Oscar is examined. A settlement is offered, but he rejects it and proceeds with his suit. After losing the trial, he goes into the appeal process.

Oscar is cared for by his stepsister Christina and his girlfriend Lily and is visited by Trish and "Jerry," i.e., Jawaharlal Madhar Pai, the lawyer who had conducted the deposition. Jerry and Oscar discuss his play at length. In the appeal process, Oscar wins his case against the movie makers, and believes he will get millions. His father, a judge, had helped by writing a legal brief. He dies before Oscar can thank him, and his clerk visits Oscar.

Harry's health deteriorates from his work-related stress, barbiturate abuse, and self-neglect. He eventually dies. Christina expects to be the beneficiary of his life insurance, but it is discovered Harry's legal firm has made itself the beneficiary of his insurance. Oscar learns that "creative accounting" of the very successful movie results in a loss, so he will not see any money. The inheritance of Oscar's and Christina's father is burdened with expenses so that, in the end, they can just keep the house. Oscar becomes more and more childish.
