= Anatole Broyard =

American writer (1920–1990)

- Broyard in 1971
- Born: Anatole Paul Broyard; July 16, 1920; New Orleans, Louisiana, US
- Died: October 11, 1990 (aged 70); Boston, Massachusetts, US
- Education: Brooklyn College (attended), New School for Social Research (attended)
- Occupations: Book critic; columnist; editor; essayist; long-form journalist; memoirist; writing teacher
- Spouse(s): Aida Sanchez (div. c. 1948); Alexandra Nelson (m. 1964)
- Children: 3
- Writing career
- Period: 1948–1990
- Subjects: Belles-lettres; Greenwich Village; hipster culture of the 1940s; high culture; illness; literary modernism
- Notable works: “A Portrait of the Hipster” (1948); "What the Cystoscope Said" (1954); Aroused by Books (1974); Men, Women and Other Anticlimaxes (1980); Intoxicated by My Illness (1992, posthumous); Kafka Was the Rage (1993, posthumous)

Anatole Broyard (1920-1990) was an American writer, literary critic, and editor whose literary output spanned several decades. His oeuvre encompassed short stories, essays, and reviews. He was a prolific contributor to several literary magazines and publications, most notably The New York Times, where he served as a regular book reviewer for nearly fifteen years and later as an editor.

Broyard's earliest published work appeared in magazines in the 1940s and early 1960s. Articles and essays in prominent intellectual journals followed.

As a literary critic, Broyard gained a reputation for his discerning and often acerbic commentary.

== Early life ==
Anatole Broyard was born on July 16, 1920 in New Orleans, Louisiana, to Anatole and Edna Broyard. Both parents were of Louisiana Creole descent. He had two sisters, Lorraine and Shirley. When Anatole was a child, the family moved to Brooklyn, New York, where his father was a construction worker.

The 21-year old Broyard enlisted in the United States Army Air Forces upon the country's entrance into World War II. He served as a troop transport officer in the Pacific Theater.

Upon his return in 1946, he moved to Greenwich Village, then home to a burgeoning bohemian intellectual and artistic cultural scene. It was in this milieu that Broyard began to cultivate his literary aspirations, contributing short stories and essays to various literary magazines and journals throughout the late 1940s and early 1950s, laying the groundwork for his extensive career.

== Career ==
=== Early years ===
Broyard used the GI Bill to take classes at Brooklyn College and The New School for Social Research in Manhattan, where he took seminars in psychoanalysis. By the late 1940s and early 1950s, Broyard had begun writing and submitting short stories and essays to "little magazines" such as Modern Writing, Discovery, and New World Writing. The magazines accepted his submissions, and upon publication he became recognized as an important new voice.

=== "A Portrait of the Hipster" ===
Broyard's essay "A Portrait of the Hipster," published in Partisan Review in 1948, came to be widely recognized and frequently quoted. In this seminal work, Broyard examined the nascent "hipster" subculture emerging in Greenwich Village. Of the hipster, Broyard wrote that "he was always of the minority—opposed in race or feeling to those who owned the machinery of recognition." And he observed intellectuals "ransacking everything for meaning, admiring insurgence... attributed every heroism to the hipster."

However, Broyard himself was far less sanguine about these perceived new rebels. He viewed their attempts to defy societal constraints through narcotics, jazz, and general disaffiliation with "straight" society as ultimately leading to a new form of conformity. Broyard noted a shift where figures once on the fringes of the jazz underground began to take themselves seriously and seek validation. As he put it, "The hipster promptly became in his own eyes, a poet, a seer, a hero." He further contended that the hipster lifestyle "grew more rigid than the institutions it had set out to defy. It became a boring routine. The hipster - once an unregenerate individualist, an underground poet, a guerrilla - had become a pretentious poet laureate."

His growing reputation in the wake of his magazine pieces led to his teaching creative writing at The New School, New York University, and Columbia University.

=== Greenwich Village ===
Broyard was deeply embedded in the cultural and social life of "The Village" in 1940s and 50s. He frequented literary salons and formed lasting connections with writers and intellectuals. Broyard was known for his sharp wit and engaging presence. He briefly ran a secondhand bookstore on Cornelia Street, a hub for literary figures. While short-lived, the bookstore further cemented his connections within this cultural milieu. His memoir, published after his death (see below), offers a vivid account of Broyard's experiences in the postwar years.

=== Critic and essayist ===
His professional career took a significant turn in 1971, when he was offered a position writing book reviews for The New York Times. He quickly became a prolific contributor, renowned for his incisive, witty, and highly opinionated critiques. He served as a daily book reviewer at the Times for nearly fifteen years, becoming a prominent "cultural gatekeeper" whose assessments could significantly affect a book's reception.

Broyard's collected literary reviews were published in Aroused by Books (1974). In the late 1970s, he also began writing personal essays for The New York Times, which many readers and critics considered to be among his most compelling work. These essays were subsequently collected in Men, Women and Other Anticlimaxes (1980). In 1984, he was given a dedicated column in the New York Times Book Review; he became an editor there in 1986.

Broyard continued his influential work as a critic, editor, and essayist until 1989, when he received a diagnosis of prostate cancer and retired from the Book Review.

== Illness and death ==
Even during his illness, Broyard remained a regular contributor to the Book Review. He wrote a weekly unsigned column called "Noted With Pleasure", and a monthly essay titled "About Books".

Upon receiving the cancer diagnosis, Broyard turned his critical gaze toward his own mortality and illness. He began to write extensively about his experiences as a patient, producing a series of essays that explored the physical and emotional realities of terminal illness. These pieces, marked by Broyard's characteristic wit and philosophical depth—now applied to the subject of death and suffering—were published by The New York Times. These essays on illness are considered some of his finest and most moving work. An extended piece on his illness was published as a memoir, Intoxicated by My Illness, after his death.

Anatole Broyard died on October 11, 1990.

== Posthumous works ==
Two of Broyard's major works were published posthumously to general acclaim, further solidifying his stature:

- Intoxicated by My Illness: and Other Writings on Life and Death (1992): This collection compiles the powerful essays he wrote during his battle with cancer, alongside other reflections on life and death. The work was widely praised for its candor and Broyard's distinctive "style for illness," which incorporated metaphor and a call for a more nuanced understanding of the patient's experience. It remains a notable contribution to the literature of illness.
- Kafka Was the Rage: A Greenwich Village Memoir (1993): This memoir offers a vivid account of Broyard's formative years in Greenwich Village during the late 1940s. It captures the intellectual ferment, artistic aspirations, and personal struggles of a young writer finding his way in the bohemian cultural landscape of post-war New York. The memoir provided valuable insight into his early development as a writer and thinker.

== Personal life ==
=== Marriages and children ===
Broyard was married twice and had a total of three children. His first marriage, to Aida Sanchez, ended in divorce after Broyard's return from military service. They had a daughter, Gala.

In 1961 Broyard married Alexandra Nelson, a modern dancer. They had two children: son Todd, born in 1964; and daughter Bliss, born in 1966. The family lived in Connecticut.

=== African-American ancestry and late notoriety ===
In 1996, The New Yorker magazine published an essay by Henry Louis Gates Jr. titled "White Like Me." In it, Gates examined Broyard's purported decision to "pass" as white; Gates characterized this as a deliberate act of concealment. This characterization, particularly the notion that Broyard actively hid his Creole ancestry, contrasts with accounts from contemporaries such as Philip Roth, who stated that Broyard's background was not a secret within their overlapping literary circles.

Broyard was the model for a character in Chandler Brossard’s 1952 novel Who Walk in Darkness, which originally began: “People said Henry Porter was a ‘passed’ Negro.” Threatened with a lawsuit, Brossard changed it to: “People said Henry Porter was an illegitimate.” Brossard was able to restore the original line when the novel was reprinted in 1972.

In 2007, Anatole's daughter Bliss Broyard published a memoir in which she claimed that her father kept his African-American ancestry a secret from his children.

Taken together, the essay and the memoir had a dual and lasting effect: they both reintroduced Broyard to a new generation of readers; and they repositioned his public image, shifting the basis of his notoriety from intellectual achievement to racial identity. This shift is especially apparent in discourse on contemporary "hipsterism" and its precursor in the 1940s subculture that Broyard examined in his 1948 essay "Portrait of a Hipster".

If it was a conversation topic amongst Broyard's circle, his Creole background went publicly undiscussed in his lifetime, and the subject of his own racial identity did not feature in his work. According to daughter Bliss, he did describe being ostracized when young by both black and white children for his ambiguous appearance.

== Legacy ==
Anatole Broyard established his place in American letters through his prolific and influential work as a literary critic and essayist. For nearly fifteen years, he served as a prominent daily book reviewer for The New York Times, a role that positioned him as a shaper of literary discourse. His critical voice was distinct, characterized by its incisiveness, wit, and often provocative opinions, blending worldliness with high culture and a memorable use of aphorisms. His collected reviews were published as Aroused by Books (1974). Broyard also won acclaim for his personal essays for The New York Times, later compiled in Men, Women and Other Anticlimaxes (1980). His posthumous works further solidified his legacy.

== Works ==
=== Selected short works ===
- "What the Cystoscope Said" (1961), published in Discovery magazine and Intoxicated by My Illness (1992)

=== Collected reviews and essays ===
- Aroused By Books (1974)
- Men, Women and Other Anticlimaxes (1980)

=== Posthumous ===
- Intoxicated by My Illness: and Other Writings on Life and Death (1992)
- Kafka Was The Rage: A Greenwich Village Memoir (1993)

== Sources ==
- Broyard, Anatole (June 1948). "A Portrait of the Hipster". Partisan Review. XV (6): 721.
- Burns, Jim (2011). Radicals, Beats And Beboppers. n.p.: Penniless Press. ISBN 978-1447630722.
- "Contributor | Anatole Broyard (1920 - 1990)". Lapham's Quarterly.
- "Daughter Discovers Father's Black Lineage". NPR. October 2, 2007.
- Dickstein, Morris (October 31, 1993). "Bohemian Rhapsody". The New York Times. ISSN 0362-4331.
- Dinerstein, Joel (July 29, 2014). "How Did Cool Become Such a Big Deal?". Humanities. National Endowment for the Humanities.
- Gates, Henry Louis Jr. (June 17, 1996). "White Like Me". The New Yorker.
- Hartsell, S. R. (2023). "Anatole Broyard". EBSCO.
- "Kafka Was the Rage by Anatole Broyard". Penguin Random House.
- Mitgang, Herbert (October 12, 1990). "Anatole Broyard, 70, Book Critic And Editor at The Times, Is Dead". The New York Times.
- Roth, Philip (September 6, 2012). "An Open Letter To Wikipedia". The New Yorker.
