= Primary Colors (novel) =

1996 book by Joe Klein

Primary Colors: A Novel of Politics
- Author: "Anonymous" later revealed as Joe Klein
- Language: English
- Genre: Political novel
- Publisher: Random House
- Publication date: January 16, 1996
- Publication place: United States
- Media type: Hardcover and Paperback
- Pages: 366 (hc)
- ISBN: 0-679-44859-4 (hc)
- OCLC: 33166616
- Dewey Decimal: 813/.54 20
- LC Class: PS3550.A1 P75 1996
- Followed by: The Running Mate

Primary Colors: A Novel of Politics is a 1996 book by columnist Joe Klein, published anonymously, about the presidential campaign of a southern governor. It is a roman à clef (a work of fiction based on real people and events) about Bill Clinton's first presidential campaign in 1992. It was adapted as a film of the same name in 1998.

The book has been compared to two other novels about American politics: Robert Penn Warren's All the King's Men (1946) and O: A Presidential Novel (2011).

Klein was identified as the author several months after its publication. He wrote a sequel, The Running Mate in 2000, focusing on Primary Colors character Charlie Martin.

== Plot summary ==
The book begins as an idealistic former congressional worker, Henry Burton, joins the presidential campaign of Southern governor Jack Stanton, a thinly disguised stand-in for Bill Clinton. The plot then follows the primary election calendar beginning in New Hampshire where Stanton's affair with Cashmere, his wife's hairdresser, and his participation in a Vietnam War era protest come to light and threaten to derail his presidential prospects. In Florida, Stanton revives his campaign by disingenuously portraying his Democratic opponent as insufficiently pro-Israel and as a weak supporter of Social Security. Burton becomes increasingly disillusioned with Stanton, who is a policy wonk who talks too long, eats too much and is overly flirtatious toward women. Stanton is also revealed to be insincere in his beliefs, saying whatever will help him to win. Matters finally come to a head, and Burton is forced to choose between idealism and realism.

== Identity of the author ==
Klein maintained his anonymity throughout the publication process. Random House's Daniel Menaker, who edited the book and came up with its title, acted as an early liaison to the press while remaining unaware of the author's identity. An early reviewer opined that the author wished to remain unknown because "Anonymity makes truthfulness much easier". Later commentators called the publishing of the book under an anonymous identity an effective marketing strategy that produced more publicity for the book, and thus more sales, without calling into question the author's actual inside knowledge.

External videos
- "Primary Colors Author Announcement" with Joe Klein and Random House publisher Harold Evans, July 17, 1996, C-SPAN

Several people, including former Clinton speechwriter David Kusnet, believed the style of writing had similarities to that of Klein. This was also supported by a quantitative stylometric analysis of the book by Vassar professor Donald Foster. Klein initially denied writing the book and publicly condemned Foster. Klein denied authorship again in Newsweek, speculating that another writer wrote it. Washington Post Style editor David Von Drehle, in an interview, asked Klein if he was willing to stake his journalistic credibility on his denial, to which Klein agreed.

In July 1996, after The Washington Post published the results of a handwriting analysis of notes made on an early manuscript of the book, Klein finally admitted that he was the author.

== Reception ==
The New York Daily News described the book as a farce and praised it as funny, truthful, and as containing "uncannily accurate" portraits of its thinly disguised characters.

The book was #1 on The New York Times Best Seller list for fiction, for nine weeks in 1996.

== Fictional characters and believed real-life inspirations ==
- Jack Stanton, southern governor – Bill Clinton
- Susan Stanton, his wife – Hillary Clinton
- Henry Burton, campaign manager – George Stephanopoulos
- Richard Jemmons, campaign strategist – James Carville
- Daisy Green, campaign media adviser – Mandy Grunwald or Dee Dee Myers
- Howard Ferguson, III, campaign chief – Harold Ickes, Jr.
- Orlando Ozio, New York governor – Mario Cuomo
- Jimmy Ozio, his son – Andrew Cuomo
- Charlie Martin, U.S. senator – Bob Kerrey
- Lawrence Harris, former senator – Paul Tsongas
- Bart Nilson, U.S. senator – Tom Harkin
- Freddy Picker, former Florida Governor – Jerry Brown / Reubin Askew / Harold Hughes / Ross Perot
- Richmond Rucker, NYC Mayor – David Dinkins
- Luther Charles, minister – Jesse Jackson
- Cashmere McLeod, suspected lover of Jack Stanton – Gennifer Flowers
- Lucille Kauffman, adviser to Susan Stanton – Susan Thomases
- Libby Holden, campaign chief of staff – Betsey Wright/ Vince Foster

== See also ==
- Politics in fiction
- The War Room, a documentary of Clinton's 1992 campaign.
