= Point Omega =

Novel by Don DeLillo

- First edition
- Author: Don DeLillo
- Language: English
- Publisher: Scribner
- Publication date: 2010
- Publication place: United States
- Media type: Print (hardback)
- Pages: 117
- ISBN: 978-1-4391-6995-7
- Dewey Decimal: 813/.54 22
- LC Class: PS3554.E4425 P65 2010
- Preceded by: Falling Man
- Followed by: Zero K

Point Omega is a novel by the American author Don DeLillo that was published in hardcover by Scribner's on February 2, 2010. It is DeLillo's fifteenth novel published under his own name and his first published work of fiction since his 2007 novel Falling Man.

According to Alexandra Alter from WSJ, "the novel follows a filmmaker who is attempting to shoot a documentary about a professor who served as an advisor to U.S. war strategists during the Iraq invasion". It opens in a "dark gallery, where a mysterious onlooker watches a super slow-motion version of Alfred Hitchcock's Psycho". The starting point for the novel came to DeLillo after visiting the Douglas Gordon 24 Hour Psycho installation at the Museum of Modern Art in 2006.

The novel derives its title from Jesuit priest Pierre Teilhard de Chardin’s concept of the Omega Point. According to DeLillo, it "considers the possible idea that human consciousness is reaching a point of exhaustion and that what comes next may be either a paroxysm or something enormously sublime and unenvisionable".

== Plot ==
According to the Scribner 2010 catalog made available on October 12, 2009, Point Omega concerns the following:

In the middle of a desert "somewhere south of nowhere," to a forlorn house made of metal and clapboard, a secret war advisor has gone in search of space and time. Richard Elster, seventy-three, was a scholar - an outsider - when he was called to a meeting with government war planners. This was prompted by an article he wrote explicating and parsing the word "rendition". They asked Elster to conceptualize their efforts - to form an intellectual framework for their troop deployments, counterinsurgency, orders for rendition. For two years he read their classified documents and attended secret meetings. He was to map the reality these men were trying to create "Bulk and swagger," he called it. He was to conceptualize the war as a haiku. "I wanted a war in three lines..."

At the end of his service, Elster retreats to the desert, where he is joined by a filmmaker intent on documenting his experience. Jim Finley wants to make a one-take film, Elster its single character - "Just a man against a wall."

The two men sit on the deck, drinking and talking. Finley makes the case for his film. Weeks go by. And then Elster's daughter Jessie visits - an "otherworldly" woman from New York - who dramatically alters the dynamic of the story. Jessie is strange and detached but Elster adores her. Elster explains how she is of high intelligence and remarks that she can determine what people are saying in advance of hearing the words by reading lips. Jim is sexually drawn to her but nothing happens except his watching her as a voyeur would. After the most pointed of such behavior Jessie disappears without a trace. There are attempts to find her, and references to a boyfriend or acquaintance possibly named Dennis. Jessie's mother had sent her to the desert to get away from this man.

In his review for Publishers Weekly, Dan Fesperman revealed that the Finley character is "a middle-aged filmmaker who, in the words of his estranged wife, is too serious about art but not serious enough about life" and compares Elster to "a sort of Bush-era Dr. Strangelove without the accent or the comic props". Writing for the Wall Street Journal, Alexandra Altar described the novel as "a meditation on time, extinction, aging and death, subjects that Mr. DeLillo seldom explored in much depth as a younger writer."

== Promotion and publicity ==
DeLillo made a series of rare public appearances in the run up to the release of Point Omega throughout September, October, and November 2009, and was set to do more press publicity upon the novel's release. One of these appearances was a PEN event in New York, 'Reckoning with Torture: Memos and Testimonies from the "War on Terror"'. This event was "an evening of readings and response, [with] Members and friends of PEN read[ing] from the recently-released secret documents that have brought these abuses to light - memos, declassified communications, and testimonies by detainees - and will reflect on how [America] can move forward as a nation."

An original short story unrelated to Point Omega entitled "Midnight in Dostoevsky" appeared in the November 30 edition of The New Yorker.

An extract from Point Omega was made available on the Simon and Schuster website on December 10, 2009.

DeLillo was set to give a first public reading of Point Omega at Book Court in Brooklyn, New York on February 11, 2010.

DeLillo made an unexpected appearance at a PEN event on the steps of the main branch of the New York City Public Library in support of Chinese dissident writer Liu Xiaobo, who was sentenced to eleven years in prison for "inciting subversion of state power" on December 31, 2009.

Point Omega spent one week on the New York Times Bestseller List, peaking at #35 on the extended version of the list during its one-week stay on the list.

== Reception ==
Point Omega received generally positive reviews.

An early mostly positive review appeared on the website of Publishers Weekly on December 21, 2009. Reviewer Dan Fesperman praised the novel's style, stating that while "it's hardly a new experience to emerge from a Don DeLillo novel feeling faintly disturbed and disoriented... DeLillo's lean prose is so spare and concentrated that the aftereffects are more powerful than usual". Fesperman goes on to add that DeLillo "is at his best rendering micro-moments of the inner life, and "laying bare the vanity of intellectual abstraction." However, Fesperman writes that there are occasions when "the going gets a little tedious", and he compares the novel to a "brisk hike up a desert mountain — a trifle arid, perhaps, but with occasional views of breathtaking grandeur."

Further praise came from the literary review Kirkus Reviews, with its reviewer declaring the novel to be "an icy, disturbing and masterfully composed study of guilt, loss and regret - quite possibly the author's finest yet." The Kirkus review further praised the novel's narrative as "crisp, precisely understated, [and] hauntingly elliptical"; approvingly drawing comparisons between Point Omega and Albert Camus' novella The Fall; and that with this novel, DeLillo had moved "a step beyond the disturbing symbolism of Falling Man".

As with the Publishers Weekly review, Leigh Anne Vrabel's review for Library Journal highlighted the quality of DeLillo's prose, stating that it is "simultaneously spare and lyrical, creating a minimalist dreamworld that will please readers attuned to language and sound." Vrabel also praised the narrative of the novel, writing that "structural purists... will appreciate the novel's film-related framing device, which wraps around the main action like a blanket and unifies the whole with a painful, poignant grace." The only slightly negative remark regards the novel's brevity, but the overall conclusion was highly positive: "though it be but brief, DeLillo's latest offering is fierce. An excellent nugget of thought-provoking fiction that pits life against art and emotion against intellect."

There were also negative notices from such publications as New York, The National and Esquire.

In his mostly negative review for New York magazine's books section, Sam Anderson struck a note of disappointment, puzzlement, and confusion. In Anderson's opinion, Point Omega is "[the latest of a] recent stretch of post-Underworld metaphysical anti-thrillers—The Body Artist, Cosmopolis, Falling Man—[showing DeLillo's writing] has reached a whole new level of [narrative] inertia". For Anderson, the novel's "glacial aesthetic" and seemingly slow moving non-plot of the novel is a major fault: "the closest the book comes to real action is when Elster's daughter shows up—although “shows up” is a strong phrase to use for a character who hardly seems to exist at all. When she disappears, mysteriously — the only major event of the novel — it seems like a formality." The experience of reading a "late-phase DeLillo" novel, according to Anderson, makes him "feel like a late-phase DeLillo character: distant, confused, catatonic, drifting into dream worlds, missing dentist appointments, forgetting the meanings of basic words, and staring at everyday objects as if they were holy relics." However, Anderson admits that "this disorientation might explain why I can’t quite make up my mind about Point Omega", suggesting some positives and elaborating that "the strongest material in Point Omega is only tangentially related to the book’s main story, and is essentially just art criticism" (referring to the bracketing chapters that begin and end the book). Anderson further remarks on the novel's style: "DeLillo is, after Beckett and Robbe-Grillet, the indisputable master of grinding a plot to the brink of stasis and then recording its every last movement. Point Omega seems like a logical endpoint of that quest." But Anderson goes on to ask with some concern, "how much further into the desert of plotlessness is DeLillo willing to go, and how far are we willing to follow? Where else can he possibly take the novel?" Anderson finally concludes on a negative note: "I get the sense that he wants his oeuvre to culminate in a pure act of attention, and I’m not convinced that the novel is the best medium in which to do that. As a raging DeLillo fan, I’d be more excited to see him branch out to another genre—an experimental autobiography, or essayistic micro-observations of his favorite art and literature—than write another short novel about detached and largely interchangeable characters."

Writing for the "Friday Review" section of The National, Giles Harvey - like Anderson's review in New York - made much criticism of the stylistic tendencies of what could be termed as 'Late DeLillo', arguing that "since the epochal 1997 masterpiece Underworld... DeLillo's books have come to seem lopsided, top-heavy: dense with cerebration but humanly thin." At his best, Harvey writes, "when [DeLillo] is... sending us dispatches from the front lines of contemporary experience... DeLillo has few obvious betters. By comparison, most of his peers seem 50 miles back, in the hermetic opulence of some requisitioned château." However, in Point Omega, Harvey feels that DeLillo "fails to make his characters more than ciphers for his ideas." Much of Harvey's criticism concerns the protagonists and characterisation. Of the retired war planner Elster, Harvey draws comparisons to Bill Gray in DeLillo's Mao II and Lee Harvey Oswald in Libra, but criticises DeLillo's characterisation for making Elster seem "less a human being than a vague aggregate of ideas." Harvey goes on, "what’s missing from DeLillo’s presentation of human beings... is emotional depth." Aside from the weak characterisation, the typical DeLillo black comedy appears to be watered down and a distilled re-reun of the humour from DeLillo's previous novels. The conversations that occur between Elster and his would-be documenter Jim Finley in the main body of the novel "can sometimes be quite funny (although not nearly as funny as the screwball conversations on similar themes in Players or White Noise)". Further, Harvey finds fault with how, as he argues, "Point Omega was presumably conceived of as an emotional education – a story about a coldly intellectual man whose daughter’s disappearance leads him to recognise the limits of the intellect and his own human fallibility... It is indicative of DeLillo's failure that he should feel the need to state so baldly the novel's intended emotional arc."
