= Americana (novel) =

1971 novel by Don DeLillo

- Author: Don DeLillo
- Language: English
- Genre: Novel
- Publisher: Houghton Mifflin
- Publication date: 1971
- Publication place: United States
- Media type: Print (hardcover and paperback)
- Pages: 388 pp (hardcover first edition)
- ISBN: 0-395-12094-2
- OCLC: 137561
- Dewey Decimal: 813/.5/4
- LC Class: PZ4.D346 Am PS3554.E4425
- Followed by: End Zone

Americana (1971) is American novelist Don DeLillo's first book. DeLillo conceived the novel while traveling through Maine with friends.

== Content ==
The book is narrated by David Bell, a former television executive turned avant-garde filmmaker. Beginning with an exploration of the malaise of the modern corporate man, the novel turns into an interrogation of film's power to misrepresent reality as Bell creates an autobiographical road-movie. The story addresses roots of American pathology and introduces themes DeLillo expanded upon in The Names (1982), White Noise (1985), and Libra (1988). The first half of the novel can be viewed as a critique of the corporate world while the second half articulates the fears and dilemmas of contemporary American life.

== See also ==
- Personal Days by Ed Park
- Then We Came to the End by Joshua Ferris
