= The Names (DeLillo novel) =

1982 novel by Don DeLillo

- The Names by Don DeLillo
- Author: Don DeLillo
- Language: English
- Genre: Postmodern literature
- Publisher: Alfred A. Knopf
- Publication date: September 12, 1982
- Publication place: United States
- Media type: Print (hardback & paperback)
- Pages: 339 (hardback first edition)
- ISBN: 0-394-52814-X
- OCLC: 8474207
- Dewey Decimal: 813/.54 19
- LC Class: PS3554.E4425 N3 1982

The Names is the seventh novel by American novelist Don DeLillo, published in 1982. The novel, set mostly in Greece, is primarily a series of character studies, interwoven with a plot about a mysterious "language cult" that is behind a number of unexplained murders. Among the many themes explored throughout the work is the intersection of language and culture, the perception of American culture from both within and outside its borders, and the impact that narration has on the facts of a story.

While some initial reviewers found The Names intellectually rich but unsuccessful, it became regarded in subsequent years as one of DeLillo's best works.

== Plot summary ==
Various business people, government agents, and corporate statisticians gather in Athens, crossing paths, before departing, elsewhere. One estranged couple, a businessman and his archaeologist wife, are there with their son, a precocious child novelist. Infidelity and cryptic remarks are part of the network of the global economy. Meanwhile, murders are discovered, committed by a cult attempting to align the initials of the victim's names to carved letters on an ancient stone. The businessmen await the arrival of a colleague, an obsessively ambitious filmmaker, who lays out an extravagant plan to film the cultists performing their bizarre ritualistic killings.

== Themes ==
=== Language ===
At the core of the book is the problem of language. Language is the way we connect with the world, and as such, it is a means of opening the world or controlling it. It is these two concepts of language, which struggle against each other, throughout the book, that are major themes, within the novel. The latter concept (language as a means of control) is embodied in the character of the archeologist Owen Brademas.

=== Religion ===
One character says, "It is religion that carries language. Language is the river of God." If language is the means of relating to the world, or even making the world, then, religion, in turn, circumscribes or frames language. Language, for DeLillo, arises in awe, towards the things of the world. That awe is religion. Religion is, thus, in some sense, a surrender, a concession that things are fundamentally outside of one's control.

=== Writing ===
As a manifestation of language, the written word is the most susceptible to control. Letters are static, while spoken words are elusive. Writing can, thus, be a desire for a full presence "a lost language, free from ambiguity." It is this aspect of writing that appeals to Owen Brademas. He is seeking a language that has been "subdued and codified,” simplified into parallel structures. But writing can also be a recovery or articulation of "ancient things, secret, reshapable." In this second type of writing, the mystery of the world is retained. In The Names, it is a child, the narrator's son, Tap, who, most purely, practices this type of writing. Unlike Owen, for whom "correctness" in speech is very important, Tap's writing is full of lively misspellings, prompting his father to look at objects in a new way.

=== Politics ===
The theme of control is also visible, in the discussion of politics carried on throughout the book. Politics is where the element of control reveals itself, most visibly, as in Empire, in the United States' relations with other countries, in the activities of corporations, in the relationship between men and women, and in the behavior of terrorists. Nonetheless, the relationship between the "stronger" and the "weaker" is not simply reducible to "oppressor" and "oppressed.” Sometimes, the weaker force is complicit with, or distorts the nature of, the stronger.

== Reception ==
In The New York Times, Michael Wood dubbed DeLillo an author of “extraordinary verve and wit” and described The Names as "a powerful, haunting book, formidably intelligent and agile” but wrote that "it also feels a little blurred, its insights scattered, rather than collected." Wood argued, "It is true that American fiction is full of people stranded between plotlessness and paranoia, between making no sense of their lives and making too much, and it would be a good defense of Mr. DeLillo to say that he has dramatized this dilemma strongly. But it would only be a defense, and 'The Names' is, still, a hard book to hold, in the mind.”

Jonathan Yardley of The Washington Post strongly praised the depiction of the community of Americans in Athens, writing that "his portraits of individual members of the community are sharp and true, his depiction of a world on the brink is wittily clinical, his dialogue is crisp and interesting.” However, Yardley also wrote that the novel "takes on too many themes and wanders in too many directions to find a coherent shape,” describing Axton's observation about language on the Parthenon as appealing but also arrived at "by so circuitous a route that many readers probably will lose patience, along the way." Yardley referred to The Names as "the work of a writer of clear if chilly brilliance” and argued that the moments when the author "thinks as keenly as he writes [...] are concentrated in the first of the book’s three principal sections".

A reviewer for Kirkus Reviews expressed similar reservations. The reviewer praised the scene in which Axton seduces the corporate wife, stating that "as long as DeLillo stays within [the] class of the edgy and expatriate, bis [sic] novel is fine--gritty and adhesive” and argued that "the larger theme is, as usual with DeLillo, the foulness of modern life--its sullying, cheapening progress." But the reviewer also wrote that "while other DeLillo books (even the weaker ones) have presented that theme with an insistent, disturbing blade of glittering scorn, this time, there is more somber meditation . . . while only a few scenes flare."

In his 1987 book-length study of DeLillo's works up to that point, however, Tom LeClair lauded The Names as DeLillo's finest work. David Cowart said the same, in 2008. In 2007, The Names was listed in New York magazine as one of the author's supreme achievements, along with White Noise, Libra, and Pafko at the Wall, with a reviewer writing, "Mixing DeLillo’s brilliant gloss on America’s place in the world in the seventies with a comic portrait of a failing marriage and Pynchonesque story of a mysterious, murderous cult, The Names is a summa of everything he’d learned up to that point, his last and greatest seventies novel, and one of his greatest novels, full stop." In 2006, Geoff Dyer wrote in The Daily Telegraph that he considered The Names to be the "great leap forward" in DeLillo's career; Dyer, later, hailed it, in The Guardian, as "a prophetic, pre-9/11 masterpiece: a 21st-century novel published in 1982,” and he argued that it should have been one of three novels by the author (along with White Noise and Underworld) to win the Man Booker Prize.

In a review of a later book by the same writer, Joshua Ferris mentioned the dialogue of the British security consultant Charles Maitland (such as his complaints about new people's republics emerging and areas' names being changed), as an example of DeLillo's skill with sentences, arguing that the author "artfully reveals Maitland’s Western view of things, while guiding the reader to ask: Who’s changing the names, and why? Smile, and the history of colonialism and the civil wars it ignited will be scrubbed out, with a quip." Jeff Somers ranked it fourth among 17 books by DeLillo and wrote, "Challenging and cerebral, the central question of the novel concerns how far context and words go towards shaping perception and, therefore, reality?" Paul Petrovic, Fran Mason, and Eileen Battersby have claimed the novel to be underrated, with Battersby writing, "Richard Ford conveys what America sounds like, how it thinks. But DeLillo explains how it fears; he describes America’s communal dread."

== Interpretation ==
Michael Wood interpreted the language cult as representing "the arbitrary, the meaningless not as chaos and confusion but as heartless, pointless pattern,” noting one character's view that they "mock our need to structure and classify, to build a system against the terror in our souls."

== Film adaptation ==
On April 7, 2015, it was announced that American writer-director Alex Ross Perry had optioned The Names for a film adaptation. However, as of 2026, the film has not entered production.

== Theater adaptation ==
In July 2018, at the Festival d'Avignon, French theater company Si vous pouviez lécher mon cœur created a play based on The Names and two other novels by DeLillo (Players and Mao II).
