= Amazons (novel) =

1980 novel by Cleo Birdwell

- Author: Don DeLillo as Cleo Birdwell
- Language: English
- Publisher: Holt, Rinehart and Winston
- Publication date: 1980
- Publication place: United States
- Media type: Print (hardback & paperback)
- Pages: 390 (hardback first edition)
- ISBN: 0-03-055426-8
- OCLC: 6597950
- Dewey Decimal: 813/.54
- LC Class: PS3552.I753 A8 1980
- Preceded by: Running Dog
- Followed by: The Names

Amazons is a novel written by Don DeLillo, published under the pseudonym Cleo Birdwell in 1980. The subtitle is An Intimate Memoir by the First Woman Ever to Play in the National Hockey League. The book was a collaboration with a former co-worker of DeLillo's, Sue Buck, and represents a commercial, light-hearted effort between his novels Running Dog and The Names. While the book is widely known to have been written by DeLillo, and is technically his seventh novel, for decades it had never been reprinted and he has only once officially acknowledged writing it. Additionally, when Viking was compiling an official bibliography for the Viking Critical Library edition of White Noise, DeLillo asked the publishers that the book be expunged from the list.

After the commercial success of Rachel Reid's Heated Rivalry and other hockey-themed romance novels, DeLillo decided in 2026 to finally allow Amazons to be republished.

== Plot summary ==
The novel is a fictitious autobiography narrated by Birdwell centering on her experiences as the first woman to play professional hockey in the NHL. It is in some ways similar to DeLillo's second novel, the football-themed End Zone, though more humorous and smaller in scale, replete with social satire and comedy. The story follows Birdwell and her teammates on the New York Rangers, as they travel around North American cities playing games and engaging in sexual adventures.

The prose is distinctly and obviously DeLillo's, but as further proof of his authorship, readers cite the appearance of the character Murray Jay Siskind, a sportswriter in the novel, who later appears as the eccentric former sportswriter-turned-"visiting lecturer on American icons" in DeLillo's novel White Noise.

== Aftermath ==
In 2014, Salon stated that DeLillo "doesn't want his name attached to [Amazons]", "has never officially acknowledged writing it", and "won’t grant permission" for it to be reprinted. In a 2020 interview with The New York Times, DeLillo finally acknowledged writing the novel. In 2026 his longtime editor Nan Graham and literary agent Robin Straus convinced him to allow it to be reprinted, reportedly after "DeLillo’s wife had stayed up until midnight the night before, reading it and laughing".
