= Players (DeLillo novel) =

1977 novel by Don DeLillo

- First edition
- Author: Don DeLillo
- Language: English
- Publisher: Alfred A. Knopf
- Publication date: 1977
- Publication place: United States
- Media type: Print (Hardback & Paperback)
- Pages: 212
- ISBN: 0-394-41260-5
- OCLC: 2614651
- Dewey Decimal: 813/.5/4
- LC Class: PZ4.D346 Pl 1977 PS3554.E4425
- Preceded by: Ratner's Star
- Followed by: Running Dog

Players is Don DeLillo's fifth novel, published in 1977. It follows Lyle and Pammy Wynant, a young and affluent Manhattan couple whose casual boredom is overturned by their willing participation in chaotic detours from the everyday.

== Plot summary ==
Lyle works on the floor of the New York Stock Exchange and spends evenings seated close to the television, rapidly flipping channels, while his wife Pammy works at a "grief management firm" in the World Trade Center. While their marriage is free of problems and they have many friends, a cloud of ennui hangs over their domestic life.

Pammy joins her friends Ethan and Jack on a trip to Maine, where they come to the realization that their collective nostalgia for simpler times and rural life is largely invented. Pammy begins a sexual relationship with Jack, who is in a homosexual relationship with Ethan, which ultimately ends in Jack's inexplicable self-immolation at a nearby junkyard.

Meanwhile, in a divergent and concurrent storyline, Lyle witnesses the shooting death of one of his acquaintances, George Sedbauer, on the floor of the exchange. Through this event, Lyle becomes privy to a vague conspiracy of violent terrorists targeting Wall Street, and his curiosity draws him into their fold. His recruitment and participation are equally inexplicable, a function of the draw of revolutionary activity and respite from the boredom of his ordinary life. His engagement with the radicals, themselves devoid of any morality or particular ideology, becomes more absurd when he attempts to inform on them to equally ill-defined government agents, and begins having sexual relationships with two other conspirators. Lyle discovers that J. Kinnear, one of the shadow key figures in the terrorist network, is a double-agent himself and the web of essentially meaningless conspiracies appears to be endless and be the end in itself; pursued not for chaotic ends, but for the sake of imposing structural order on what the "players" view to be chaos.

== Main themes ==
In Players DeLillo precipitates many of the themes wrought by rampant consumerism in late twentieth century America that he would later explore in White Noise and Underworld. The notion of terrorist as societal actor, the appeal of fringe ideologies, and the utility of conspiracies first explored here would later be given more in-depth treatment in DeLillo's Mao II.
