= The Silence (novel) =

2020 novel by Don DeLillo

- First edition cover
- Author: Don DeLillo
- Audio read by: Laurie Anderson, Jeremy Bobb, Marin Ireland, Robin Miles, Jay O. Sanders and Michael Stuhlbarg
- Language: English
- Publisher: Scribner
- Publication date: October 20, 2020
- Publication place: United States
- Media type: Print (hardcover and paperback), e-book, audio
- Pages: 128
- ISBN: 978-1-9821-6455-3 (hardcover)
- Preceded by: Zero K

The Silence is a short novel by Don DeLillo. It was published by Scribner on October 20, 2020. An audiobook version was released the same day, narrated by Laurie Anderson, Jeremy Bobb, Marin Ireland, Robin Miles, Jay O. Sanders and Michael Stuhlbarg.

== Synopsis ==
In 2022, on the night of the Super Bowl, Jim Kripps and his wife Tessa Berens are flying from Paris to their home in Newark, New Jersey when their plane crash-lands. In their Manhattan apartment, married couple Diane Lucas and Max Stenner are waiting for Jim and Tessa to arrive to their Super Bowl party. Martin Dekker, one of Diane's former physics students, is the only guest who has arrived. Suddenly, the world's electronic systems go dark.

== Reception ==
In its starred review, Kirkus Reviews called The Silence a "vivid" book, and that "in its evocation of people in the throes of social crisis, it feels deeply resonant."

Publishers Weekly praised DeLillo's "mastery of dialogue" and said the work stood out among DeLillo's short fiction but felt "underpowered" compared to his novels.

In two separate reviews, The Guardian both praised and critiqued DeLillo's book. Alex Preston thought The Silence to be symbolic of DeLillo's waning powers stating: "Reading DeLillo’s post-Underworld novels has been a strange and melancholy affair, like watching an object of great brilliance recede, slowly, into the distance." Anne Enright was much more positive on DeLillo's slim apocalyptic tale: "Nobody speaks the way the characters in this novel do, nor are we asked to believe they would. They are, however, compelling and human, and their voices have a ritualised urgency. DeLillo is a master stylist, and not a word goes to waste. This is the novel as performance art, as expressionistic play."

== Film adaptation ==
In February 2021, Deadline Hollywood reported that producer Uri Singer acquired the screen rights to The Silence. Singer also produced Noah Baumbach's 2022 film White Noise, an adaptation of Delillo's novel of the same name. In October 2021, Jez Butterworth was announced as screenwriter.
