= Phoenix Springs =

2024 video game

- Developer: Calligram Studio
- Publisher: Calligram Studio
- Platform: Linux; macOS; Microsoft Windows
- Release: October 7, 2024
- Genre: Point-and-click adventure
- Mode: Single-player

Phoenix Springs is a 2024 point-and-click video game developed and published by Calligram Studio. The PC version was released on October 7, 2024.

== Gameplay ==
Players control Iris Dormer, a veteran reporter searching for her estranged brother. Unlike in traditional point-and-click games where characters collect physical items, Iris gathers information such as names, ideas or phrases. She must connect these clues with the world around her or ask NPCs about them in order to progress.

== Development ==
Phoenix Springs was funded by a successful Kickstarter campaign in 2017. The final game trailer premiered at the Day of the Devs showcase during Summer Game Fest 2024. Most of the development team is based in the United Kingdom.

== Themes ==
In an interview with The New York Times, writer and designer Jigmé Özer stated that Phoenix Springs investigates themes at the heart of Buddhism, such as death and the nature of reality. He said the game’s inspirations included Don DeLillo’s novel Zero K, which explores the philosophical implications of life-extending technology, as well as his own research into dementia villages.

== Reception ==
Reception

Aggregate scores
Aggregator	Score
Metacritic	72/100
OpenCritic	77% recommend

Review score
Publication	Score
Eurogamer	3/5

Review aggregator website OpenCritic determined that 77% of critics recommended the game. It received "mixed or average" reviews according to Metacritic. Some reviewers expressed frustration with the surreal and abstract storytelling, while praising the art direction and quality of the writing. The Verge called it “unsettling, smart, and emotionally cathartic”. Polygon said it was “a lesson in using negative space, both visually and narratively”. TheGamer rated it 5/5, declaring it “a vibrant reinvention of the point-and-click.” In his review for Eurogamer, Matt Wales summarized: "A beautiful, elusive mood piece, Phoenix Springs' blend of taut dystopian detective noir and meandering surrealism is likely to frustrate as much as it intrigues."

=== Accolades ===
Year	Ceremony	Category	Result	Ref.
2024	A MAZE	Wings Prize	Nominated	
2025	Games for Change	Best In Innovation	Nominated	
2025	New York Game Awards	Herman Melville Award for Best Writing	Nominated	
