= Great Jones Street (disambiguation) =

Great Jones Street a street in New York City's NoHo district in Manhattan.

Great Jones Street may also refer to:

- Great Jones Street (novel), a 1973 novel by Don DeLillo
- "Great Jones Street", a song by Luna from Bewitched
