= Falling Man (novel) =

2007 novel by Don DeLillo

- Cover to the first edition
- Author: Don DeLillo
- Language: English
- Genre: Novel
- Publisher: Scribner
- Publication date: 2007
- Publication place: United States
- Media type: Print (hardback)
- Pages: 256 (hardback first edition)
- ISBN: 1-4165-4602-2
- OCLC: 76901941
- LC Class: PS3554.E4425 F36 2007
- Preceded by: Cosmopolis
- Followed by: Point Omega

Falling Man is a novel by American writer Don DeLillo, published May 15, 2007. An excerpt from the novel appeared in short story form as "Still Life" in the April 9, 2007, issue of The New Yorker magazine.

Falling Man concerns a survivor of the 9/11 attacks and the effect his experiences on that day have on his life thereafter.

== Themes ==
Like DeLillo's previous works, the novel is thematically concerned with the symbolic nature of terrorist violence portrayed through the mass media. In addition, DeLillo's narrative examines the possibilities of reinventing individual identity as well as the tendency of individuals to construct their identities through a group mentality. The Falling Man himself is symbolic of "the hubris of trying to make art out of horror."

== Reception ==
Michiko Kakutani writing for The New York Times considered it a disappointment, saying that although "flashes of Mr. DeLillo’s extraordinary gifts for language can be found in his depiction of the surreal events Keith witnessed on 9/11 ... the remainder of the novel feels tired and brittle." World Socialist Web Site critic Sandy English concluded that parts of the novel were "moving, and one can learn something about the reactions of a particular social layer in New York at the time," but as a whole it "does not succeed as a unified work of art. It falls short of the significance of the events themselves."

Some critics were more positive: both Laura Miller in Salon and Jennifer Reese in Entertainment Weekly described it as DeLillo's best novel since Underworld in 1997, with Miller noting that "DeLillo is a master of the prose riff, and there are a few riffs in here as good as anything he's ever produced."

== See also ==
- September 11, 2001 attacks in popular culture
