= Great Jones Street (novel) =

1973 novel by Don DeLillo

- First edition
- Author: Don DeLillo
- Language: English
- Publisher: Houghton Mifflin
- Publication date: 1973
- Publication place: United States
- Media type: Print (Hardback & Paperback)
- Pages: 265 pp (Hardback first edition)
- ISBN: 0-395-15566-5
- OCLC: 623265
- Dewey Decimal: 813/.5/4
- LC Class: PZ4.D346 Gr PS3554.E4425
- Preceded by: End Zone
- Followed by: Ratner's Star

Great Jones Street is Don DeLillo's third novel, and was published in 1973. It centers on rock star Bucky Wunderlick, who also narrates the novel. Running Dog magazine, a parody of Rolling Stone introduced in Great Jones Street, would later play a central role in DeLillo's 1978 novel of the same name.

== Plot and characters ==
Dissatisfied with the life that his fame, fortune, and revolutionary image has bought, Bucky Wunderlick retreats to an unfurnished apartment on Great Jones Street in Manhattan and tries to pare things down. A spokesperson for Happy Valley Farm Commune, named Skippy, delivers to Bucky for safekeeping a package containing a drug that debilitates the language centers of the brain. Wunderlick's iconic status in the counterculture, and his privateness, had attracted the attention of Happy Valley, a domestic terrorist organization. A skinhead-like offshoot known as the Dog Boys also rampages through his apartment building.

Bob Dylan is reputed to be one of the models for the character of Bucky Wunderlick. A key subplot involves the theft of Wunderlick's unreleased Mountain Tapes. These are clearly inspired by Dylan's The Basement Tapes, which would not be released until the summer of 1975 and were still shrouded in mystery. Ambitious but neurotic guitarist Azarian reflects less-than-complimentary stories about The Band's Robbie Robertson. Wunderlick's characterization by withdrawal and contrariness fits the public image of Dylan.

In the novel, Wunderlick's girlfriend Opel passes away from neglect of her health. She had arranged for the Mountain Tapes to arrive at Wunderlick's apartment for his birthday. The novel also covers his relationship with the other tenants in the building; upstairs lives a struggling author, and downstairs a mother who is ashamed of her disfigured son and keeps him locked in his room after she was unable to sell him to the circus.

The Mountain Tapes are eventually destroyed by the Happy Valley commune. They also inject Wunderlick with a drug that affects the language center of the brain, so that he will no longer be able to form words, only meaningless noises. Near the end of the book the drug wears off and he begins to gain back his speech, beginning with the word "mouth".
