= Zero K (novel) =

2016 novel by Don DeLillo

- Cover of first edition
- Author: Don DeLillo
- Audio read by: Thomas Sadoski
- Cover artist: Jasper James (photo); Jaya Miceli (design)
- Language: English
- Publisher: Scribner
- Publication date: May 3, 2016
- Publication place: United States
- Media type: Print (Hardcover)
- Pages: 288
- ISBN: 978-1-5011-3539-2
- OCLC: 1090921903
- Dewey Decimal: 813/.54
- LC Class: PS3554.E4425 Z35 2016
- Preceded by: Point Omega
- Followed by: The Silence

Zero K is a 2016 novel by American author Don DeLillo.

== Plot summary ==
The novel concerns a billionaire, Ross Lockhart, who is inspired by the terminal illness of his wife Artis to seek immortality for both of them through cryopreservation. The novel is narrated by Ross' son Jeffrey. DeLillo has described Zero K as 'a leap out of the bare-skinned narratives of Point Omega and The Body Artist.'

== Reception ==
James Lasdun of The Guardian wrote, "This being DeLillo, it goes without saying that there’s a much higher quotient of beautiful sentences and arresting observations than you'd find in most other living writers", and drew particular focus to a taxi ride in New York City, "a virtuoso passage that effortlessly braids observations on money, global politics, traffic patterns, family relations, airport security rituals and the unstoppable torrent of information...in its flow, is as good as any of the great Arthur Avenue passages in Underworld.

Alex Preston of The Observer went further, calling the book "beautiful and profound, certainly DeLillo's best since Underworld.

Joshua Ferris of The New York Times was effusive in his praise, declaring, "sentence by sentence, DeLillo magically slips the knot of criticism and gives his readers what Nabokov maintained was all that mattered in life and art: individual genius. Sentence by sentence, DeLillo seduces." He continued: "as in the best of DeLillo's previous novels, down to the pleasures of the final page. The scene takes place in New York, with Jeff on a crosstown bus. It ends the book powerfully. I finished it stunned and grateful. DeLillo has written a handful of the past half-century's finest novels. Now, as he approaches 80, he gives us one more, written distinctly for the 21st."

Zero K was also reviewed by Sam Sacks for The Wall Street Journal, Michiko Kakutani for The New York Times, Nathaniel Rich for The New York Review of Books, Carolyn Kellogg for the Los Angeles Times, Meghan Daum of The Atlantic and Arin Keeble of The Independent.

== Audiobook ==
The audiobook is read by Thomas Sadoski.

== Television adaptation ==
In March 2017, film-maker Charlie McDowell announced he was adapting Zero K as a limited series for FX with Noah Hawley and Scott Rudin producing.
