= Valparaiso (play) =

First edition (publ. Simon & Schuster)

Valparaiso is Don DeLillo's second play, in which a man suddenly becomes famous following a mistake in the itinerary of an ordinary business trip which takes him to Valparaíso, Chile, instead of Valparaiso, Indiana.

The 1999 play, which incorporates live performance with video projection, looks at how the media has affected modern mankind. The central character, Michael Majeski, tries desperately to establish his own identity by throwing himself under the spotlight of celebrity. The piece is composed entirely of interviews, for a range of different media, and culminates in the protagonist committing assisted suicide with a microphone lead on a TV talk show.

Valparaiso received its premiere at the American Repertory Theater in 1999 under the direction of David Wheeler. Since then it has seen numerous revivals, including a production by Steppenwolf Theatre in Chicago and a French-language version in Paris. In 2002, the Rude Mechanicals of New York staged the New York premiere, referred to by The New York Times as "a revelatory new production", directed by Hal Brooks. In 2003, it received its college premiere at Savannah College of Art and Design under the auspices of the Ghlei company.

In 2005, DeLillo granted the UK premiere rights of the play to 24-year-old film school graduate Jack McNamara, whose production premiered at the Old Red Lion Theatre in London on April 25, 2006. The production was produced by Weaver Hughes Ensemble. US productions in 2007 were: The Garage Theatre in Long Beach, California, directed by Jeff Kriese; The Hideout Theatre in Austin, Texas, directed by Jeremy O. Torres. US productions in 2008 include HB Studio, an HB Ensemble production, in New York City, directed by Rasa Allan Kazlas.

== Reception ==
- The New York Times
- The New York Times (again)
- The Daily Telegraph
- The Financial Times
- The London Review
- MusicOMH
- The Stage

== Performances ==
- List of performances
