= Running Dog =

1978 novel by Don DeLillo

- First edition cover
- Author: Don DeLillo
- Cover artist: Karl Korab
- Language: English
- Genre: Novel
- Publisher: Alfred A. Knopf
- Publication date: 1978
- Publication place: United States
- Media type: Print (Hardback & Paperback)
- Pages: 246 (hardback first edition)
- ISBN: 0-394-50143-8
- OCLC: 3516537
- Dewey Decimal: 813/.5/4
- LC Class: PZ4.D346 Ru PS3554.E4425
- Preceded by: Players
- Followed by: Amazons

Running Dog is a 1978 novel by Don DeLillo. The book concerns Moll Robbins, a reporter for the eponymous magazine – a fictional underground, once-radical magazine which satirizes Rolling Stone – whose investigation into the suspicious activities of a member of the U.S. Senate uncover the possible existence of a pornographic film of Adolf Hitler, purportedly filmed in his bunker in the climactic days of Berlin's fall. As Robbins digs deeper into the film's existence and whereabouts, more and more individuals become obsessed with finding it, including underground art collectors and the Mafia, leading to a surreal and violent series of events.

The book is a loose sequel to DeLillo's third novel Great Jones Street, which also featured the staff of Running Dog as characters.

Reviewing the book for The New York Times, Michael Wood wrote: "the work itself has an air of weariness, of routine violence and acceptable paranoia, of intrigue without point or profit, which strikes me as a very accurate reflection of a contemporary mood."

== See also ==
- Running dog
