= White Noise (2022 film) =

Film by Noah Baumbach

- Release poster
- Directed by: Noah Baumbach
- Screenplay by: Noah Baumbach
- Based on: White Noise by Don DeLillo
- Produced by: Noah Baumbach; David Heyman; Uri Singer
- Starring: Adam Driver; Greta Gerwig; Don Cheadle
- Cinematography: Lol Crawley
- Edited by: Matthew Hannam
- Music by: Danny Elfman
- Production companies: A24; NBGG Pictures; Heyday Films
- Distributed by: Netflix
- Release dates: August 31, 2022 (Venice); November 25, 2022 (United States)
- Running time: 136 minutes
- Countries: United Kingdom; United States
- Language: English
- Budget: $80–140 million
- Box office: $79,040

White Noise is a 2022 absurdist comedy-drama film written and directed by Noah Baumbach, adapted from the 1985 novel by Don DeLillo. It is Baumbach's first directed feature not based on a story of his own. The film stars Adam Driver, Greta Gerwig, and Don Cheadle. Set in the 1980s, it follows the life of a niche academic and his family as they go through trials and tribulations, beginning with an environmental disaster near their home.

White Noise had its world premiere at the 79th Venice International Film Festival on August 31, 2022, and was released in select theaters on November 25 before its streaming release by Netflix on December 30. The film received generally positive reviews from critics, with Baumbach's direction, cinematography, cast performances (particularly Driver's), and Danny Elfman's score receiving praise, although the film's screenplay, varying tones, and length divided many.

== Plot ==
In 1984, Jack Gladney is a professor of "Hitler studies" (a field he founded) at the College-on-the-Hill, in Ohio. Despite his specialization, he speaks no German and is secretly taking basic lessons to prepare for a speech he is due to give at a conference. Jack is married to Babette, his fourth wife. Together, they have a blended family with four children: Heinrich and Steffie, from two of Jack's previous marriages; Denise, from one of Babette's previous marriages; and Wilder, a child they conceived together. Denise finds Babette's secret stash of Dylar, a mysterious drug not listed in the usual records. Jack has a dream about a mysteriously threatening man, alluding to an earlier conversation with Babette about their shared fear of death. His colleague Murray Siskind, a professor of American culture, wishes to develop a similarly niche field, "Elvis studies", and convinces Jack to help him.

Their lives are disrupted when a truck carrying toxic chemicals collides with a train, releasing a cloud of waste. This "Airborne Toxic Event" forces a massive evacuation and a traffic jam on the highway. The Gladneys stop at a gas station to refuel their car, and Jack is exposed to the cloud. The family and many others are forced into quarantine at a summer camp. Experts tell Jack his exposure may shorten his life. Murray gives Jack a palm-sized pistol to protect himself against the more dangerous survivalists in the camp. One day, multiple families desperately try to escape the camp. The Gladneys take the back way out and ford a river before arriving in Iron City, where they encounter a man who rants about the evacuees' lack of media attention but stops when he sees Jack, claiming to have déjà vu of that moment. After nine days, the family returns home. Jack's exposure to the cloud has heightened his fear of death.

Later, everything has returned to normal except that Babette has become pale, lethargic, and emotionally distant from the rest of the family. Soon afterward, Jack begins hallucinating a balding man following him around. Denise is worried about the Dylar and Jack confronts Babette. She admits to having joined a shadowy clinical trial for a drug to treat death anxiety, and says that when she was cut from the trial, she agreed to have sex with "Mr. Gray" in exchange for continuing to receive the drug. The couple become distraught and distanced, and Jack searches through the trash for the last Dylar pills to treat his own fear of death. He instead finds a tabloid advertisement for the clinical trial, prompting him to retrieve his pistol and find Mr. Gray. Jack arranges to meet him at a motel to buy Dylar, and discovers that Mr. Gray is the man from his hallucinations. Jack shoots him and places the gun in his hand to make it look like suicide. Babette unexpectedly arrives as Mr. Gray, still alive, shoots them both. After Jack and Babette convince the confused Mr. Gray that he is responsible for all their injuries, they take him to a nearby hospital run by German atheist nuns. There, the couple reconcile.

The next day, the Gladneys visit their local supermarket. They and the other patrons and employees dance as the credits roll.

== Cast ==
- Adam Driver as Jack Gladney
- Greta Gerwig as Babette Gladney
- Don Cheadle as Murray Siskind
- Raffey Cassidy as Denise Gladney
- Sam Nivola as Heinrich Gladney
- May Nivola as Steffie Gladney
- Jodie Turner-Smith as Winnie Richards
- André Benjamin as Elliot Lasher
- Sam Gold as Alfonse
- Carlos Jacott as Grappa
- Lars Eidinger as Mr. Gray
- Bill Camp as Man with TV
- Barbara Sukowa as Sister Hermann Marie
- Francis Jue as Dr. Lu
- Henry and Dean Moore as Wilder Gladney
- Gideon Glick and Chloe Fineman as Simuvac Technicians
- Kenneth Lonergan as Dr. Hookstratten

== Production ==
=== Development ===
On July 28, 2004, Barry Sonnenfeld was set to direct the film adaptation of Don DeLillo's White Noise from a script by Stephen Schiff. In 2016, Uri Singer acquired the rights to the book and pushed the project into development. On October 17, 2016, Michael Almereyda was set to write and direct the film adaptation. On January 13, 2021, it was revealed that Noah Baumbach would adapt and direct the film for Netflix, co-producing with David Heyman and Uri Singer.

=== Casting ===
On December 22, 2020, Adam Driver and Greta Gerwig were cast in the film. In April 2021, Raffey Cassidy, May Nivola, and Sam Nivola joined the cast. In July, Jodie Turner-Smith joined the cast and it was confirmed that Don Cheadle would also star. In August, it was announced that André Benjamin had joined the cast.

=== Filming ===
Principal photography began in June 2021, under the working title Wheat Germ. Filming took place in Ohio, including the University of Akron for about six weeks, Ashtabula Pine Lake Raceway and Trail Riding, Cleveland Heights, College of Wooster, Wellington, Oberlin, Dorset, Hiram College, Andrews Osborne Academy, Kent State University, and Lowell Klienfelter Stadium at Canton Central Catholic High School.

Filming took place in downtown Cleveland on November 4, 2021, with scenes shot on the Hope Memorial Bridge.

=== Music ===
The film score is by Danny Elfman and was released as an album on November 18, 2022. LCD Soundsystem reunited to record its first new music in over five years for the film. The song, "New Body Rhumba", was released as a single on September 30.

== Release ==
White Noise had its world premiere as the opening film of the 79th Venice International Film Festival on August 31, 2022, and was also the opening film at the 2022 New York Film Festival on September 30. It screened at the 31st Philadelphia Film Festival in October 2022. The film was theatrically released in the United States by Netflix on November 25, 2022, before its streaming release on December 30.

== Reception ==
=== Critical response ===
On the review aggregator website Rotten Tomatoes, White Noise holds a rating of 64% based on 261 reviews, with an average rating of 6.5/10. The site's critics consensus reads: "White Noise may occasionally struggle with its allegedly unfilmable source material, but Noah Baumbach succeeds in finding the humorous heart of its surprisingly timely story." On Metacritic, which uses a weighted average, the film has a score of 66 out of 100, based on 45 critics, indicating "generally favorable" reviews.

Peter Bradshaw of The Guardian gave the film five out of five stars, writing, "Baumbach has landed a sizeable white whale in his tremendously elegant and assured adaptation." The Hollywood Reporter’s David Rooney called it "Equal parts clear signal and wearying static", praising the cast performances, humor, and score, but finding the screenplay inconsistent. David Ehrlich of IndieWire called the adaptation "equal parts inspired and exasperating".

In Artforum, Will Sloan wrote that the lead roles are played as if they are in different films and called the score a "thick lather" and the ending smug: "there's no escape from banality, but at least we can smirk at it."

Filmmaker Wes Anderson wrote, "This movie is dazzling and mysterious and poetic and wildly entertaining. It's a completely new concoction from one of our most original voices who has refined and developed his talents in ways we can only stand back and admire (and enjoy)."

=== Accolades ===
Accolades for White Noise
Award	Date of ceremony	Category	Recipient(s)	Result
Venice Film Festival	September 10, 2022	Golden Lion	Noah Baumbach	Nominated
Venice Film Festival	September 10, 2022	Green Drop Award	Noah Baumbach	Won
Mill Valley Film Festival	October 15, 2022	MVFF Award For Screenwriting	Noah Baumbach	Won
Hollywood Music in Media Awards	November 16, 2022	Best Original Score in a Feature Film	Danny Elfman	Nominated
Hollywood Music in Media Awards	November 16, 2022	Best Original Song in a Feature Film	James Murphy, Nancy Whang, Patrick Mahoney ("new body rhumba")	Nominated
Phoenix Critics Circle	December 15, 2022	Best Actor	Adam Driver	Nominated
St. Louis Film Critics Association	December 18, 2022	Best Adapted Screenplay	Noah Baumbach	Nominated
Indiana Film Journalists Association	December 19, 2022	Best Adapted Screenplay	Noah Baumbach	Nominated
Indiana Film Journalists Association	December 19, 2022	Best Musical Score	Danny Elfman	Nominated
Indiana Film Journalists Association	December 19, 2022	Best Stunt/Movement Choreography	David Neumann	Nominated
North Carolina Film Critics Association	January 3, 2023			
North Carolina Film Critics Association	January 3, 2023	Composer Tribute Award	Danny Elfman	Won
North Carolina Film Critics Association	January 3, 2023	Best Original Song	“new body rhumba”	Nominated
Music City Film Critics Association	January 9, 2023			
Music City Film Critics Association	January 9, 2023	Best Original Song	“new body rhumba”	Nominated
Golden Globe Awards	January 10, 2023	Best Actor in a Motion Picture – Musical or Comedy	Adam Driver	Nominated
Critics' Choice Movie Awards	January 15, 2023	Best Song	"new body rhumba"	Nominated
North Dakota Film Society	January 16, 2023	Best Original Song	“new body rhumba”	Nominated
Portland Critics Association	January 16, 2023	Best Comedy Film	Noah Baumbach, David Heyman, Uri Singer	Nominated
Portland Critics Association	January 16, 2023	Best Actor	Adam Driver	Nominated
Seattle Film Critics Society	January 17, 2023	Best Production Design	Claire Kaufman and Jess Gonchor	Nominated
Online Film Critics Society	January 23, 2023	Best Adapted Screenplay	Noah Baumbach	Nominated
Chicago Indie Critics	January 23, 2023	Best Original Song	“new body rhumba”	Nominated
Set Decorators Society of America Awards	February 14, 2023	Best Achievement in Decor/Design of a Period Feature Film	Claire Kaufman and Jess Gonchor	Nominated
Art Directors Guild Awards	February 18, 2023	Excellence in Production Design for a Period Film	Jess Gonchor	Nominated
Artios Awards	March 9, 2023	Best Casting - Comedy (Big Budget)	Douglas Aibel, D. Lynn Meyers, Matthew Glasner	Nominated

== See also ==
- Goebel Beer
- Postmodernist film
- Postmodernist literature
- 2023 Ohio train derailment
