= PEN/Saul Bellow Award for Achievement in American Fiction =

The PEN/Saul Bellow Award for Achievement in American Fiction was awarded by PEN America (formerly PEN American Center) "to a distinguished living American author of fiction whose body of work in English possesses qualities of excellence, ambition, and scale of achievement over a sustained career which place him or her in the highest rank of American literature." Initially carrying a stipend of US$40,000, the award was created with the cooperation of the Saul Bellow estate and through a grant from Evelyn Stefansson Nef. Announcing the first recipient of the award (Bellow's close friend Philip Roth), PEN president Ron Chernow said the award honors "one of America’s greatest writers...whose work over a forty-year career exemplified the capacity of fiction to encompass the totality of human experience. We are confident that this Award will help to recognize and perpetuate the qualities so evident in Saul Bellow’s writings."

The award was first given in 2007 and remained until 2018.

The award is one of many PEN awards sponsored by International PEN affiliates in over 145 PEN centers around the world. The PEN American Center awards have been characterized as being among the "major" American literary prizes.

== Award winners ==
PEN/Saul Bellow Award for Achievement in American Fiction winners
Year	Author	Ref.
2007	Philip Roth	
2009	Cormac McCarthy	
2010	Don DeLillo	
2012	E. L. Doctorow	
2014	Louise Erdrich	
2016	Toni Morrison	
2018	Edmund White	
