= Pafko at the Wall =

Novella by Don DeLillo

- Author: Don DeLillo
- Cover artist: John Fulbrook
- Language: English
- Publisher: Scribner
- Publication date: October 9, 2001
- Publication place: United States
- Media type: Print (hardback)
- Pages: 96 (hardback first edition)
- ISBN: 0-7432-3000-0
- OCLC: 48013766
- Dewey Decimal: 813/.54 21
- LC Class: PS3554.E4425 P34 2001

"Pafko at the Wall", subtitled "The Shot Heard Round the World", is a text by Don DeLillo that was originally published as a folio in the October 1992 issue of Harper's Magazine. It was later incorporated as the prologue in DeLillo's acclaimed novel Underworld (1997), with minor changes from the original version, such as a new opening line. In 2001, "Pafko" was re-released as a novella, by Scribner. This is the same version as printed in Underworld, where the section is titled "The Triumph of Death", in reference to the painting by Pieter Brueghel the Elder.

The title character is Andy Pafko, who, as the Dodgers' left fielder, saw Bobby Thomson's famous shot go over his head.
