= Uri Singer =

Businessman and film producer

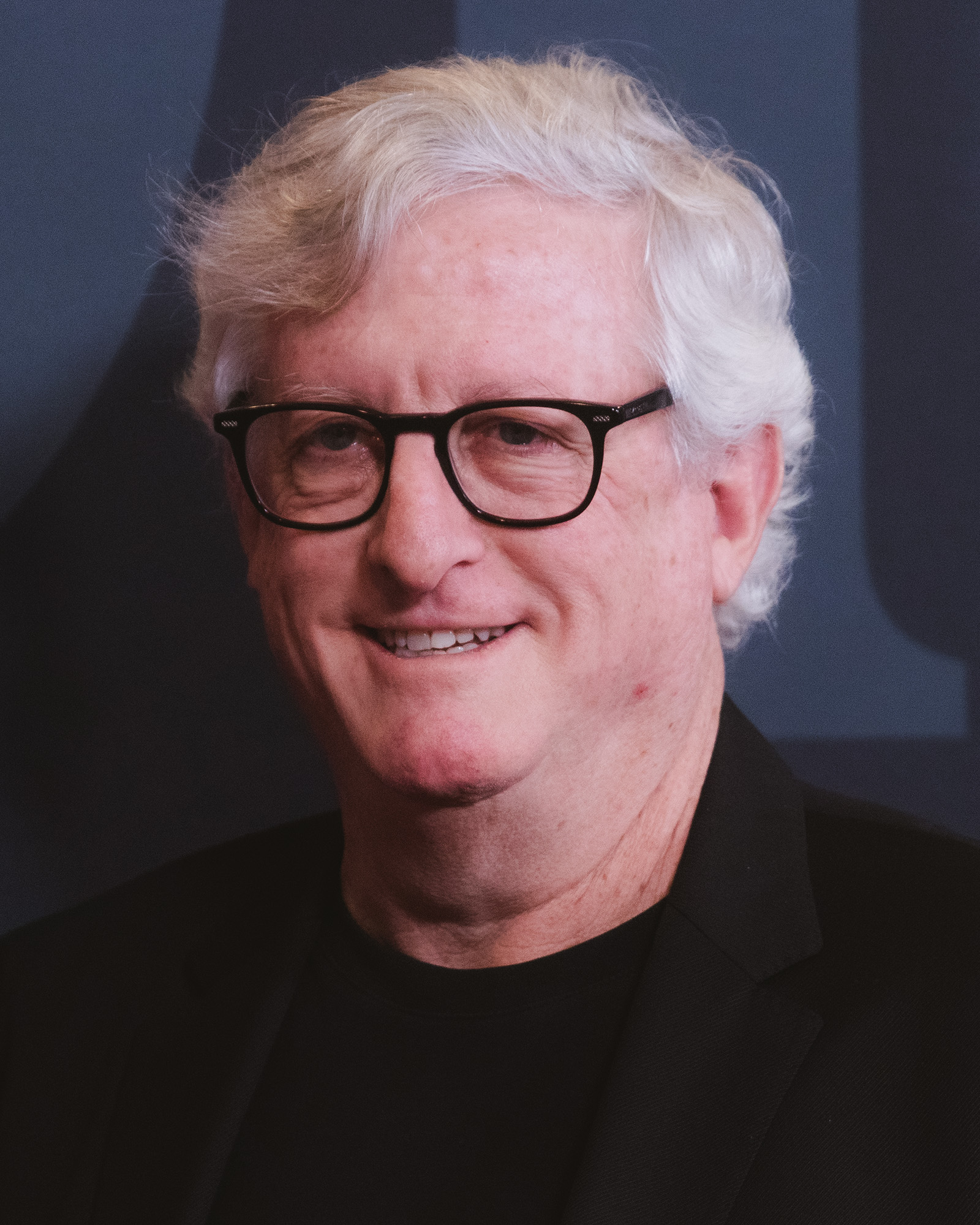
- Singer in 2026
- Born: December 30, 1960 (age 65); Israel
- Occupation: Film producer

Uri Singer; is a businessman and film producer. He is the owner and CEO of Passage Pictures.

Singer has acquired and adapted post-modern literary works for the screen, including Kurt Vonnegut’s Hocus Pocus and The Silence by Don DeLillo. He also produced Marjorie Prime, based on a play by Jordan Harrison. The film was written by Michael Almereyda and premiered at Sundance in 2017. It went on to win the Alfred Sloan Foundation Feature Film Prize.

Other projects include Experimenter (written and directed by Michael Almereyda) starring Peter Sarsgaard and Winona Ryder, as well as TESLA, starring Ethan Hawke and Kyle MacLachlan, which premiered at Sundance in 2020. The film won the Alfred Sloan Foundation Feature Film Prize.

In 2020, Singer acquired the rights to DeLillo's Underworld. In September 2021, it was announced that Theodore Melfi would write and direct the film for Netflix. Also in September 2021, Singer obtained the rights to Vladimir Nabokov’s Invitation to a Beheading.

His most recent project, White Noise, based on Don DeLillo's novel, was released by Netflix in 2022, with Noah Baumbach directing. Singer is a member of the Producers Guild of America (PGA).

== Filmography ==
Date	Title	Notes
2026	Corporate Retreat	
2022	White Noise	
2020	Tesla	
2017	Marjorie Prime	
2015	Breaking Through	
2015	Experimenter	
2014	Like Sunday, Like Rain	
2013	Man Camp	
2013	Open Road	
2010	Bed & Breakfast	
2010	I Want Candy (short)	
2009	Predileção	

== TV ==
Date	Title	Status
2012	Avance Producido en Hollywood	Released
