= The Body Artist =

2001 novella by Don DeLillo

- Author: Don DeLillo
- Language: English
- Publisher: Scribner
- Publication date: February 6, 2001
- Publication place: United States
- Media type: Print (hardback & paperback)
- Pages: 128 (hardback first edition)
- ISBN: 0-7432-0395-X
- OCLC: 44676019
- Dewey Decimal: 813/.54 21
- LC Class: PS3554.E4425 B63 2001
- Preceded by: Underworld
- Followed by: Cosmopolis

The Body Artist is a novella written in 2001 by Don DeLillo. It explores the grieving process of a young performance artist, Lauren Hartke, following the suicide of her significantly older husband. The novella is sometimes described as a ghost story due to the appearance of an enigmatic figure that Lauren discovers hiding in an upstairs room of the house following her husband's death.

== Plot summary ==
Lauren Hartke and her film director husband, Rey Robles, are occupying an isolated house outside New York City. They have a sparse verbal exchange over breakfast before Rey leaves to go for a drive. Later that morning, Rey is found dead of a self-inflicted gunshot wound in his first wife's Manhattan apartment. An obituary detailing the frequently ambiguous details of Rey's life ensues, along with his history of depression and the fact that Lauren had been Rey's third wife.

A bereaved Lauren remains alone in the house against the advice of her friends and relatives. She becomes disconnected from the temporal world and from her own body, experiencing frequent and inexplicable déjà vu. Lauren spends the subsequent hours, days and weeks exploring this disconnection. She practices her trademark 'bodywork'-- aerobic and stretching techniques she has developed to prepare her body for performance pieces. Lauren also integrates a sequence of daily rituals, including chopping firewood and gazing for hours at webcam footage of a road in Kotka, Finland.

One morning, Lauren hears a noise coming from the upper floor of the house. She goes upstairs to investigate but finds no one there. Lauren goes upstairs again the next day. This time, she finds a man sitting in one of the bedrooms. The man's appearance varies each time Lauren sees him. This ageless man, whom Lauren dubs Mr. Tuttle, is unclear about his origins; he articulates only in fragments that echo past conversations between Lauren and Rey previous to Rey's suicide. These echoes are so uncanny as to include body gestures and intonations, leading Lauren to bring him into the house, bathe him, and take him shopping, all the while trying to pry from him the source of his "memories," that is, the conversations between Lauren and her dead husband.

Lauren processes Mr. Tuttle's presence in her home, all the while continuing her body artistry, detailed through her practice, a sort of yogic / kinesiological series of sometimes quotidian expressive postures that ultimately become imbued with her sublimation of deep loss. Because of Mr. Tuttle's "channeling" of Rey's words, Lauren begins to perceive him as an avatar of her late husband, and her attachment to him extends to sexual expression. Mr. Tuttle repeats the conversation between Lauren and Rey upon Rey's final departure from his wife towards Manhattan, where he shoots himself. Soon afterwards, Mr. Tuttle disappears.

After a period of searching for him, Lauren emerges as having absorbed Mr. Tuttle's voice, and an article by Lauren's friend Mariella establishes that Lauren has adopted, as a body artist, a performance that includes her "transformation" into a masculinized Mr. Tuttle figure. As the narrative closes, Lauren continues to grieve in the couple's home, and the owner visits, asking if he can retrieve a chest of drawers stored in the house. After this visit, Lauren continues ineffectually processing her grief, a psychic state mirrored throughout the text in the repetition/perseverance of the narrative.

== Film ==
In December 2014, Variety reported that French director Benoît Jacquot would make a film adaptation of the novel. The film is titled À jamais (or in English, Never Ever) and premiered at the 73rd Venice International Film Festival on September 9, 2016, before playing at the 2016 Toronto International Film Festival.
