= Ratner's Star =

1976 novel by Don DeLillo

- Author: Don DeLillo
- Language: English
- Genre: Science fiction novel
- Publisher: Alfred A. Knopf
- Publication date: June 1976
- Publication place: United States
- Media type: Print (hardback and paperback)
- Pages: 438 (hardback first edition)
- ISBN: 0-394-40083-6

Ratner's Star is a 1976 novel by Don DeLillo. It relates the story of a child prodigy mathematician who arrives at a secret installation to work on the problem of deciphering a mysterious message that appears to come from outer space. The novel has been described as "famously impenetrable".

The novel has been described as a Menippean satire and akin to the works of Thomas Pynchon. In critical reviews, the protagonist, Billy Twillig, was compared to Billy Pilgrim, the protagonist in Kurt Vonnegut's 1969 novel Slaughterhouse-Five.

The novel is told in two parts; the first is a conventional narrative, the second is less so. The author has said that the structural model was Alice's Adventures in Wonderland and Through the Looking-Glass. The novel develops the idea that science, mathematics, and logic—in parting from mysticism—do not contain the fear of death, and therefore offer no respite.
