= End Zone =

1972 novel by Don DeLillo

- First edition cover
- Author: Don DeLillo
- Language: English
- Genre: Satirical novel; sports novel
- Publisher: Houghton Mifflin
- Publication date: March 1972
- Publication place: United States
- Media type: Print (hardcover and paperback)
- Pages: 242 (hardcover first edition)
- ISBN: 0-395-13645-8
- OCLC: 309479
- Dewey Decimal: 813/.5/4
- LC Class: PZ4.D346 En PS3554.E4425

End Zone is Don DeLillo's second novel, published in 1972.

Concerned with American history, violence, and sports, the novel foreshadows much of DeLillo's later work. Set at small Logos College in West Texas, End Zone is narrated in first person by Gary Harkness, a blocking back on the football team during the school's first integrated year.

== Plot summary ==
Cover of the UK first edition.

The novel is divided into three sections. In the first, Gary Harkness, the narrator, meets Taft Robinson, Logos College's first Black football player as well as Major Staley, the teacher of his modern warfare class. This class sparks Gary's developing obsession with nuclear warfare. Gary begins dating Myna Corbett and an assistant coach commits suicide just as the crowning game of the season approaches.

The second section is solely a play-by-play retelling of the Big Game itself, where the main thematic content of the novel exists. DeLillo's disconnected, detached prose focuses the text on certain isolated images and dialogue throughout the game.

The third section surrounds the aftermath of the game as well as the impact of the plane-crash death of Logos College's founder. Gary, filled with ennui after these events, plays a complex war game with Major Staley; the novel's metaphor of football as warfare is challenged in the line "warfare is warfare." Taft Robinson admits that he has a morbid interest in the Holocaust which mirror's Gary's obsession. The novel ends with Gary being hospitalized for a mental breakdown, his future uncertain.

== Reception ==
A reviewer for Kirkus Reviews argued that DeLillo "seems to have at his natural command a kind of articulate mobility one cannot help but admire. [...] It's hard to take a body count of all those ideas which freefall off every page but then 'the thing to do is to walk in circles.' And occasionally pause. . . ." In The New York Times Book Review, Thomas R. Edwards deemed End Zone an improvement over Americana and said that the writing "is continuously energetic, shifty, fun to watch for its own sake.” Edwards also argued that "[Gary's] fever, casually introduced in the final paragraph, hints at the uncertain but possible value of vulnerability, persisting without certitude in a world where others accept defensive systems —technologies, religion, games, the large or small cultisms that flourish where fear is.”

Anya Taylor at the City University of New York argued the book would endure, especially praising Gary's desert meditation on the end zone. Taylor discussed how the novel dramatizes certain limitations of language and negative social phenomena involving language (such as the covering of unpleasant truths through euphemisms, or the prevention of meaningful interaction through over-reliance on simplistic maxims), and interpreted the novel as "a book about the decline of language under the bombardment of terms from thermonuclear warfare, and an attempt to revive language through an ascetic disciplined ritual of silence and self-loss". Christopher Lehmann-Haupt of The New York Times stated that End Zone confirmed DeLillo as one of the best young writers of his time, writing that the author was skilled at building scenes for comedic effect and praising the football game that is considered the novel's centerpiece as well as the pick-up game in the snow.

Bill Beckett of The Harvard Crimson was less positive. While writing that End Zone has perhaps the best extended account of a football game ever written, and that the novel shows the author's "golden ear for the tin and tinsel of Americanese", Beckett also argued that "even isolated good satire can't hold together a disappointingly anticlimactic novel. DeLillo's buildup of suspense finally dissipates totally; many ominous hints are lost or forgotten by the end. [...] A season in the chaotic life of Gary Harkness, interesting as he is, does not suffice to make a satisfying whole."

Chad Harbach lauded End Zone in 2004 as "a wonderful and underrated novel". Daniel Roberts highly praised the novel in a 2018 retrospective for The Paris Review, where he wrote, "No novel nails the omnipresent violence of football better than End Zone". In 2007, however, the novel was listed by New York as one of the DeLillo's works that is "for fans only": "There’s little plot to speak of in this second novel, just a series of hilarious riffs on the parallels between football and nuclear war. That’s not the most original comparison to draw, and the ending—or rather, the lack of one—makes it an ultimately unsatisfying read." In 2011, Martin Amis listed End Zone among his favorite novels in DeLillo’s output. Jeff Somers conversely ranked it 10th out of 17 of the author’s books, arguing that it was extremely funny but also that "there’s not much of a story here, and after meandering about for a while, it sort of just stops dead in its tracks."
