= Mao II =

1991 novel by Don DeLillo

- Author: Don DeLillo
- Language: English
- Publisher: Viking
- Publication date: June 20, 1991
- Publication place: United States
- Media type: Print (Hardback & Paperback)
- Pages: 256 (hardback first edition)
- ISBN: 0-670-83904-3
- OCLC: 22766802
- Dewey Decimal: 813/.54 20
- LC Class: PS3554.E4425 M36 1991
- Preceded by: Libra
- Followed by: Underworld

Mao II, published in 1991, is Don DeLillo's tenth novel. The book tells the story of a novelist, struggling to finish a novel, who travels to Lebanon to assist a writer being held hostage. The title is derived from Andy Warhol's Mao silkscreen prints depicting Chinese Communist leader Mao Zedong. DeLillo dedicated the book to his friend Gordon Lish. Major themes of the book include crowds and the effects of political terrorism. Mao II received positive reviews from critics and won the PEN/Faulkner Award in 1992.

== Plot summary ==
A reclusive novelist named Bill Gray works endlessly on a novel which he chooses not to finish. He has chosen a life secluded from the outside world in order to try to keep his writing pure. He, along with his assistant Scott, believes that something is lost once a mass audience reads the work. Scott would prefer Bill didn't publish the book for fear that the mass-production of the work will destroy the "real" Bill. Bill has a dalliance with Scott's partner Karen Janney, a former member of the Unification Church who is married to Kim Jo Pak in a Unification Church Blessing ceremony in the prologue of the book.

Bill, who lives as a complete recluse, accedes to being photographed by a New York photographer named Brita who is documenting writers. In dialogue with Brita and others, Bill laments that novelists are quickly becoming obsolete in an age where terrorism has supplanted art as the "raids on consciousness" that jolt and transform culture at large. Bill disappears without a word and secretly decides to accept an opportunity from his former editor Charles to travel to London to publicly speak on the behalf of a Swiss writer held hostage in war-torn Beirut.

Meanwhile, Karen ends up living in Brita's New York apartment and spends most of her time in the homeless slums of Tompkins Square Park. In London, Bill is introduced to George Haddad, a representative of the Maoist group responsible for kidnapping the writer. Bill decides to go to Lebanon himself and negotiate the release of the writer. Cutting himself off from Charles, he flees to Cyprus where he awaits a ship that will take him to Lebanon.

In Cyprus, Bill is hit by a car and suffers a lacerated liver which, exacerbated by his heavy drinking, kills him in his sleep while en route to Beirut. In the epilogue, Brita goes to Beirut to photograph Abu Rashid, the terrorist responsible for the kidnapping. The fate of the hostage is never revealed, though the implication is grim. The plot unfolds with DeLillo's customary shifts of time, setting, and character.

== Themes ==
The last sentence of the prologue reveals an important and major theme in Mao II: "The future belongs to crowds." Crowds feature heavily in the book, from the opening crowds of thousands at the mass wedding at Yankee Stadium, to the crowds living in Tompkins Square Park, to the thousands of mourners at the Ayatollah's funeral as observed on television by Karen. The nature of crowds and their relation to personal and collective identity are explored.

In predicting an age of terror in which "the major work involves midair explosions and crumbled buildings," DeLillo anticipated the profound effect that political terror was soon to have on American society. The question of the efficacy of art in the context of dogmatism and violence of a massive scale is central to the narrative. In preparing the novel, DeLillo's editor at Viking, Nan Graham, said, "Long before he had written anything Don told me he had two folders -- one marked 'art' and the other marked 'terror.'"

Just two years before the novel was published Khomeini issued a fatwa calling for the death of Salman Rushdie after his publication of The Satanic Verses and New York Post photographers had ambushed J. D. Salinger in New Hampshire. DeLillo cited the published Salinger photograph and a photograph of a Unification Church Blessing ceremony he came across as inspiration for the book, telling Vince Passaro:

I didn't know it at the time, but these two pictures would represent the polar extremes of "Mao II," the arch individualist and the mass mind, from the mind of the terrorist to the mind of the mass organization. In both cases, it's the death of the individual that has to be accomplished before their aims can be realized.

== Thomas Pynchon blurb ==
Notoriously reclusive author Thomas Pynchon provided the blurb for Mao II. It reads: "This novel's a beauty. DeLillo takes us on a breathtaking journey, beyond the official versions of our daily history, behind all easy assumptions about who we're supposed to be, with a vision as bold and a voice as eloquent and morally focused as any in American writing."

== Reception ==
In The Washington Post, Sven Birkerts referred to Mao II as one of DeLillo's best novels. While arguing that "the tension that gathers around Gray dissipates towards the end and the final pages feel unfocused", Birkerts praised the ways in which the crowd motif is threaded throughout the novel and also praised the secondary characters, writing, "There is always a new angle, a new window onto a world in its paroxysms of transformation." Birkerts lauded the work as "DeLillo's strongest statement yet about the crisis of crises. Namely: that we are living in the last violet twilight of the individual". In The New York Times, Lorrie Moore wrote that "no one's prose is better than Mr. DeLillo's", and noted the author's "way of capturing a representative slice of a city, his ability to reproduce ineffable urban rhythms, his startling evocations of sights and smells." While writing that she was more "engaged and impressed" than moved by Mao II and that the novel has less emotional depth than White Noise and Libra, Moore still praised DeLillo's ability to convey multiple points of view and argued that "within its own defined parameters [...] Mr. DeLillo's new book succeeds as brilliantly as any of his others."

A reviewer for Publishers Weekly deemed the novel a "remarkable achievement" and stated, "The beauty of DeLillo's prose enlivens such seemingly dry questions. Mao II reconfirms DeLillo's status as a modern master and literary provocateur." It also received praise in Kirkus Reviews, where the reviewer wrote that the author's "talking heads murmur the mysteries of our age. For all its 'cool gloom,' his latest novel stands in denial of Gray's doom-drenched semiotics: it's a luminous book, full of anger deflected into irony, with moments of hard-earned transcendence."

Conversely, John Lanchester argued in the London Review of Books that Mao II had a "rather over-schematic central theme and plot-strand” and criticized the novel as "[trying] to force home Gray’s arguments that ‘what terrorists gain, novelists lose’. This, oddly enough, is to do those ideas a disservice, as, in Keats's famous words, ‘we hate poetry that has a palpable design on us.’ I don’t think I will be the only reader of Mao II to miss DeLillo in his comic vein, the comic vein which hasn’t at all precluded seriousness in his other work; its absence in Mao II is, I’m afraid, likely to have something to do with a vocational self-importance." In The New York Review of Books, Robert Towers wrote, "Mao II is a more somber work, less concentrated as a narrative; and it is shorter than either of its predecessors. The cast of characters is relatively small, and the characters themselves, while sharply delineated, are perhaps less interesting in the long run than the images and themes that cluster around them."

Mao II was placed in the second tier ("Recommended") in a 2007 New York guide to DeLillo's oeuvre, where the novel was described as "DeLillo at his most aphoristic [...] Less a novel than a series of crowd-scene set pieces linked by a reclusive novelist’s attempt to free a poet hostage, it contains his most extended thoughts on the relationship between fiction and terrorism." In 2011, Martin Amis listed Mao II among his favorite novels in DeLillo’s output. In a 2016 retrospective write-up for Granta, Colin Barrett lauded Mao II as a "mordantly funny, casually prescient, hypnotically condensed novel about art, about terror [...] short, loosely plotted but simultaneously tight as a drum". Jeff Somers ranked it sixth among 17 DeLillo books, arguing that "it doesn’t have much of a plot and can be perceived as DeLillo disappearing into himself—but when you’re as strong a writer as DeLillo, you can get away with that. Its seemingly prophetic vision of terrorist acts to come (it was published in 1991) grant the book gravitas".
