= Underworld (novel) =

1997 novel by Don DeLillo

- Author: Don DeLillo
- Language: English
- Genre: Postmodern
- Publisher: Scribner
- Publication date: October 3, 1997
- Publication place: United States
- Media type: Print (hardback and paperback)
- Pages: 827 (hardback first edition)
- ISBN: 0-684-84269-6 (hardback first edition)
- OCLC: 36783742
- Dewey Decimal: 813/.54 21
- LC Class: PS3554.E4425 U53 1997
- Preceded by: Mao II
- Followed by: The Body Artist

Underworld is a 1997 novel by American writer Don DeLillo. The novel is centered on the efforts of Nick Shay, a waste management executive who grew up in the Bronx, to trace the history of the baseball that won the New York Giants the pennant in 1951, and encompasses numerous subplots drawn from American history in the second half of the twentieth century. Described as both postmodernist and a reaction to postmodernism, it examines themes of nuclear proliferation, waste, and the contribution of individual lives to the course of history.

A best-seller that was nominated for the National Book Award and shortlisted for the Pulitzer Prize, Underworld is often regarded as DeLillo's supreme achievement. In 2006, a survey of eminent authors and critics conducted by The New York Times named Underworld as the runner-up for the best work of American fiction of the past 25 years, behind only Toni Morrison's Beloved.

== Background ==
Following the publication of the well-regarded novels White Noise (1985), Libra (1988), and Mao II (1991), DeLillo made few public appearances and published little for several years while writing Underworld, besides the folio short story Pafko at the Wall which was incorporated into the prologue of Underworld with minor changes.

According to DeLillo, the novel's title came to him as he thought about radioactive waste buried deep underground and about Pluto, the god of death. DeLillo has said that the front page of The New York Times on October 4, 1951, inspired Underworld. That page has headlines about both the baseball game and the Soviet nuclear test that figure in the plot.

The cover design for the American edition features a photograph of the World Trade Center towers taken by André Kertész.

== Plot summary ==
The prologue is a fictionalized account of The Shot Heard 'Round the World, a home run by Bobby Thomson on October 3, 1951, that won the National League pennant for the New York Giants against their cross-town rivals, the Brooklyn Dodgers. In DeLillo's account, the game-winning ball is caught by a young black fan named Cotter Martin, while J. Edgar Hoover, watching in the stands, is informed in the middle of the game of the second Soviet atomic bomb test.

The remainder of the novel, comprising six parts and an epilogue, is a reverse chronological account of the life of Nick Shay, the man who ultimately ends up with the baseball, from his undirected existence as an executive of a waste management company in Arizona in the 1990s back to his childhood in the Bronx in the 1950s, though the non-linear narrative includes a large number of digressions and ancillary subplots.

Part 1 takes place in 1992. Nick Shay lives in Arizona with his wife, Marian, who is having an affair with his colleague, Brian Glassic. Nick visits an art installation of B-52 aircraft that are being painted in the desert by Klara Sax, with whom Nick had an affair forty years earlier. It is revealed that Nick killed a man when he was a teenager, and that Nick's father disappeared when Nick was a child after going out to get a pack of Lucky Strikes. Nick prefers to imagine that he was killed by the Mafia. In a flashback to 1951, Cotter Martin's father takes the baseball from his son with the intention of selling it.

In Part 2, in the late 1980s and early 1990s, Marian begins her affair with Brian, while Nick acquires the baseball from an avid baseball memorabilia collector named Marvin Lundy after Brian meets Lundy on a trip to New York City to see the Fresh Kills Landfill. Elsewhere, in the Bronx, a pessimistic, germophobic nun named Sister Edgar, who was Nick Shay's Catholic school teacher in the 1950s, works among the unbelieving poor and sick. A videotape of a serial killer nicknamed the Texas Highway Killer is described.

In Part 3, in the spring of 1978, Nick attends a waste management conference in the Mojave Desert and meets a swinger named Donna, while Marvin Lundy traces the baseball to San Francisco.

Part 4, in the summer of 1974, mainly concerns Klara Sax, who is working as an artist in New York City, and Matt Shay, Nick's brother, a former chess prodigy, who is a scientist in the nuclear weapons program in New Mexico.

Part 5 encompasses the 1950s and 1960s, beginning with Nick Shay in juvenile detention, following Nick's relationship with a woman named Amy and later with his future wife Marian, and Matt's courtship of his wife Janet. Lenny Bruce's comedy routines on the Cuban Missile Crisis are mentioned several times. In another flashback, Cotter Martin's father sells his baseball to Charles Wainright, a white fan standing in line with his son outside of Yankee Stadium.

Part 6, from the fall of 1951 to the summer of 1952, relates how Nick Shay, running loose after his father left his family, accidentally kills his friend George Manza.

In the epilogue, Nick and Brian travel to Kazakhstan to watch a demo of a new waste disposal system that incinerates the waste with a nuclear explosion. Nick confronts Brian about his affair with Marian, but decides to stay with Marian. Esmeralda, a feral girl in the Bronx whom the Catholic nuns were trying to save, is raped and murdered. Her image then miraculously appears on a billboard. Sister Edgar dies shortly after witnessing the miracle.

== Literary significance and reception ==
Underworld received high acclaim from literary critics, particularly for DeLillo's prose and ambition. David Wiegand of the San Francisco Chronicle declaring it DeLillo's "best novel and perhaps that most elusive of creatures, a Great American Novel." Many have described the book as emotionally powerful. David Foster Wallace wrote DeLillo a letter in 1997, praising the novel and DeLillo's talent. He described "the book as an organic thing" and stated that

This novel is (1) a great and significant piece of art fiction; (1a) not like any novel I've read; (2) your best work ever, so far; (3) a huge reward for someone who's read all your previous stuff because it seems to be at once a synthesis and a transfiguration – a transcendence – of your previous stuff; (4) a book in which nothing is skimped or shirked or tossed off or played for the easy laugh, and where (it seems to me) you've taken some truly ballsy personal risks and exposed parts of yourself and hit a level of emotion you've never even tried for elsewhere (at least as I've read your work).

He also remarked on the phonetics of the novel, telling Delillo "you use these Saxonic devices heavily and over and over and yet the prose never seems heavy or straining; in fact just the opposite: it always seems exquisitely controlled, sober, poised rather than lunging."

Other critics, however, praised DeLillo's prose but found the novel overlong and argued it could have benefited from more editing. On Salon.com, Laura Miller wrote that "Nick's secret, the one that supposedly provides the book's suspense, proves anticlimactic."

In May 2006, The New York Times Book Review named Underworld as a runner-up for the best work of American fiction of the previous 25 years. It garnered 11 of 125 votes, losing to Toni Morrison's Beloved by four votes.

The literary critic Harold Bloom, although also expressing reservations about the book's length, said Underworld was "the culmination of what [DeLillo] can do" and one of the few contemporary American works of fiction that "touched what I would call the sublime," along with works by Cormac McCarthy (Blood Meridian), Philip Roth (American Pastoral and Sabbath's Theater), and Thomas Pynchon (Mason & Dixon, Gravity's Rainbow and The Crying of Lot 49).

Underworld was a finalist for the 1997 National Book Award, as well as for the 1998 Pulitzer Prize. The novel won the 2000 William Dean Howells Medal.

== Allusions and references ==
The novel has J. Edgar Hoover utterly intrigued by The Triumph of Death, a painting by Pieter Bruegel the Elder. Hoover first sees the painting while at the baseball game; the painting was reproduced in Life and pieces of it fall on him when someone in the stands above tears up the magazine and tosses the pieces. Later in the book he obtains a print of the painting.

Several segments of the novel are named in homage to other works. Das Kapital is Karl Marx's magnum opus, "Long Tall Sally" is a song by Little Richard also famous as a cover by The Beatles, and "Cocksucker Blues" is an infamous unreleased Rolling Stones song and film. "Better Things for Better Living Through Chemistry" was an advertising slogan for DuPont, while "The Cloud of Unknowing" is an anonymous work of Christian mysticism written in Middle English in the latter half of the 14th century. The section titled "Arrangement in Grey and Black" refers to a James McNeill Whistler painting better known as Whistler's Mother.

The novel incorporates a number of historical events. The prologue is about "The Shot Heard 'Round the World" and the whereabouts of the ball hit by Thomson are a recurrent element of the book. The book also employs Lenny Bruce’s reaction to the Cuban Missile Crisis and Soviet Union's atomic weapons program (including their testing grounds in Kazakhstan). Additionally described are screenings of the Zapruder film and a fictional, rediscovered Sergei Eisenstein film. Numerous characters attend Truman Capote's famous Black and White Ball. The main character also finds himself walking through New York during a power outage amid the Northeast blackout of 1965.

Other references include a historical and biographical account of the building of the Watts Towers. There are also frequent references to The Honeymooners.

== Adaptation ==
The novel was at one point optioned by producer Scott Rudin for a film adaptation before it lapsed. In 2002, Robert Greenwald held the rights and was in discussions for turning it into a television miniseries.

In 2020, Uri Singer acquired the rights to the novel. In September 2021, it was announced that Netflix will be adapting the novel into a feature film with Theodore Melfi as writer and director and Singer as producer.

== See also ==
- Hysterical realism
- Postmodern literature
