= Libra (novel) =

1988 novel by Don DeLillo

- First edition
- Author: Don DeLillo
- Language: English
- Publisher: Viking Press
- Publication date: August 15, 1988
- Publication place: United States
- Media type: Print (Hardback & Paperback)
- Pages: 458 pp
- ISBN: 0-670-82317-1
- OCLC: 17510108
- Dewey Decimal: 813/.54 19
- LC Class: PS3554.E4425 L53 1988
- Preceded by: White Noise
- Followed by: Mao II

Libra is a 1988 novel by Don DeLillo that describes the life of Lee Harvey Oswald and his participation in a CIA conspiracy to assassinate President John F. Kennedy. The novel blends historical fact with fictional supposition.

Libra received critical acclaim and earned DeLillo the inaugural Irish Times International Fiction Prize as well as a nomination for the 1988 National Book Award for Fiction.

== Plot ==
The book follows two related but separate narrative threads: episodes from Oswald's life from his childhood until the assassination and his death, and the actions of other participants in the conspiracy. A secondary parallel story follows Nicholas Branch, a CIA archivist of more recent times assigned the monumental task of piecing together the disparate fragments of Kennedy's death.

Oswald is portrayed as a misfit antihero, whose overtly communist political views cause him difficulties fitting into American society. Raised by a single mother in the Bronx, Oswald enlists in the military in the 1950s and is stationed at the Naval Air Facility Atsugi in Japan, where he amuses his fellow marines with his earnest left-wing ideology. Oswald defects to the Soviet Union after the end of his service and is interviewed by the KGB about the U-2 reconnaissance planes he observed at Atsugi, although he is unable to furnish much useful information. Following a suicide attempt, Oswald is moved to Minsk, where he works in a factory and meets a young woman, Marina, whom he marries. In the early 1960s, Oswald and Marina relocate to Texas.

Concurrently in the novel, a cadre of CIA agents disillusioned by Kennedy's perceived failure to adequately support the Bay of Pigs invasion hatch a plot to stage an assassination attempt and blame it on the Cuban government. The chief conspirators in the CIA are Win Everett, Lawrence Parmenter and TJ Mackey. The conspiracy grows to encompass several largely independent factions, including organized crime figures in New Orleans and a contingent of Cuban exiles in Miami. Although at first they planned to intentionally miss the President, at some point it’s decided the gunman should aim to kill.

After Oswald's return from the Soviet Union, he comes to the attention of the conspirators, who realize that his history of public support for communism makes him a perfect scapegoat. They make contact with him and guide him along the path to the assassination. Oswald also meets a fellow serviceman in Dallas who has become a black nationalist and the two men attempt an assassination of the far-right General Edwin Walker in his living room.

On November 22, 1963, as President Kennedy's motorcade is passing through Dealey Plaza in downtown Dallas, Oswald shoots at him from the Texas School Book Depository while a small group of Cuban exiles fires from behind the grassy knoll. Oswald is able to escape the scene of the crime because, as an employee of the Depository, the police do not identify him as a suspect. Later that afternoon, he shoots a Dallas patrolman who stops him for suspicious behavior. Oswald goes to a movie theater where the CIA conspiracy had planned to kill him but before they can do so he is apprehended by Dallas police. A few days later, Oswald is murdered in police custody by Jack Ruby, a nightclub owner with underworld connections who was manipulated into killing Oswald by the conspirators.

At the end of the novel, Oswald is buried under an alias in a grave in Fort Worth in a small ceremony attended by his immediate family members.

== Historicity ==
DeLillo has stated that Libra is not a nonfiction novel due to its inclusion of fictional characters and speculative plot elements. Nevertheless, the broad outline of Oswald's life, including his teenage years in New York City, his military service, his use of the alias "Hidell", and his defection to the Soviet Union are all historically accurate. Both the Warren Commission and the United States House Select Committee on Assassinations implicated Oswald in the attempted assassination of General Walker. Many other characters in the novel, including FBI agent Guy Banister, Oswald's friend George de Mohrenschildt, and his wife Marina were real people. In an author's note at the close of the book, DeLillo writes that he has "made no attempt to furnish factual answers to any questions raised by the assassination."

The Warren Commission found that Oswald acted alone, while the House Select Committee on Assassinations concluded that Kennedy's assassination was likely the result of a conspiracy.

=== Characters ===
The novel contains both real-life figures and characters of DeLillo's own creation. The following real-life people appear as characters in the novel:

- Lee Harvey Oswald
- Marina Oswald Porter
- Jack Ruby
- George de Mohrenschildt
- Guy Banister
- David Ferrie
- Marguerite Oswald
- Edwin Walker

== Themes ==
The character Nicholas Branch, tasked with writing the secret official CIA history of the assassination, concludes that the effort will be never-ending and the whole truth ultimately unknowable. For DeLillo, the Kennedy assassination was a turning point in American history that shattered the country's sense in the postwar era of a common reality and purpose. The medium of fiction allows the reader to reclaim some of the balance and coherence that history lacks.

The novel refers to the report of the Warren Commission as the novel that "James Joyce would have written if he'd moved to Iowa City and lived to be a hundred," as it comprises an almost encyclopedic picture of American life in the 1950s and 1960s comparable to the detailed depiction of Dublin in Joyce's novels.

The book's title comes from Oswald's astrological sign, and, as a picture of a scale, symbolizes for Branch the outside forces of history weighing in on Oswald's fate as well as the fate of the entire assassination plot. According to DeLillo, the scale also hints at how "a man could tip either way" with regard to committing the ultimate crime, and suggests a man torn between conflicting ideas and impulses, exemplified by the tension between his service in the United States military and his communist beliefs.

== Reception ==
Libra was acclaimed by book critics. Writing for The New York Times, novelist Anne Tyler referred to the book as DeLillo's "richest" novel and said that the "herringbone plot line serves to make the most humdrum occurrence seem suddenly meaningful, laden with dark purpose." She praised the author as "inventing, with what seems uncanny perception, the interior voice that each character might use to describe his own activities. [...] That Mr. DeLillo has been able to make his readers see the story the same way - that finally we're interested less in the physical events of the assassination than in the pitiable and stumbling spirit underlying them - proves Libra to be a triumph."

A Publishers Weekly reviewer wrote, "The novel bears dissection on many levels, but is, taken whole, a seamless, brilliant work of compelling fiction. What makes Libra so unsettling is DeLillo's ability to integrate literary criticism into the narrative, commenting throughout on the nature and conventions of fiction itself without disturbing the flow of his story." The reviewer argued that the "subtle juxtaposition of the author's version of events with the Zapruder film" causes the work to "raise meaningful questions on the relationship between fiction and truth."

Robert Towers of The New York Review of Books praised Libra as "exceptionally interesting" and stated that DeLillo "imaginatively traces the lines of force converging to produce those echoing shots that 'broke the back of the American century'."

Adam Begley of the London Review of Books deemed it the author's best book up to that point, praising him for avoiding caricature in portrayals of disturbed individuals such as Ferrie and Ruby and "[leaving] room for pity, if not for compassion." Begley also argued that DeLillo "never seems overwhelmed or constrained by the facts of the case. Nor is he vexed by contradictions and omissions. Libra displays his genius for creative paranoia: he fills the gaps in the record with his imagination, spinning a brilliant web out of a heap of improbable coincidences."

A more moderately positive review appeared in Kirkus Reviews, where the reviewer wrote that "DeLillo mars the book a little with overly portentous intellectual meditations (by one of the CIA operatives) on the nature of plots--murderous or fictional--and by Jack Ruby's hopelessly awkward Jewish-gangster manner of speaking. But these are flaw-specks in a book that is genuinely dread-filled--a story that everyone knows he doesn't really know, and which DeLillo worries, and prods, and deepens with sure artistry."

Merle Rubin of The Christian Science Monitor stated, "DeLillo is deft enough at blending fact and fiction - at weaving many of the numberless known clues into a plausible narrative soaked in evocative atmosphere. Yet he cannot muster the Dostoyevskian depth and resonance that sometimes enable a writer to present a fiction more compelling than the real event that inspired it."

Norman Mailer was a great admirer of Libra and said that the book had inspired him to write Oswald's Tale, his 1995 biography of Oswald.

In 2007, Oswald was described in New York magazine as DeLillo's greatest character. In a 2008 retrospective, Troy Jollimore argued, "In his imaginative and sympathetic portrait of Oswald, of Jack Ruby, of Win Everett and Larry Parmenter and the other conspirators, DeLillo displays a deep understanding of how history really works, how much of it is accidental, unintended." In 2018, Jeffrey Somers wrote, "The Kennedy assassination is an event DeLillo might have invented if it hadn't actually happened. [...] Sometimes this one is overshadowed by other titles, but arguably it and White Noise are DeLillo's masterworks."

== Awards and impact ==
Libra was awarded the inaugural Irish Times International Fiction Prize, as well as a nomination for the 1988 National Book Award for Fiction.

James Ellroy mentioned Libra as an inspiration for his novel American Tabloid, another take on the causes of the assassination.

== Adaptations ==
A two-part audio drama adaptation of the novel was broadcast on BBC Radio 4 in August 2026. It was written by Ben Lewis and starred Fisher Stevens and Tucker St. Ivany.

A 1991 documentary entitled Don DeLillo: The Word, the Image, the Gun, broadcast on BBC One as part of is Omnibus arts strand, included excerpts from the book read by Bob Sherman accompanied by archive images and a dramatized scene featuring an actor depicting Oswald.
