= White Noise (novel) =

1985 novel by Don DeLillo

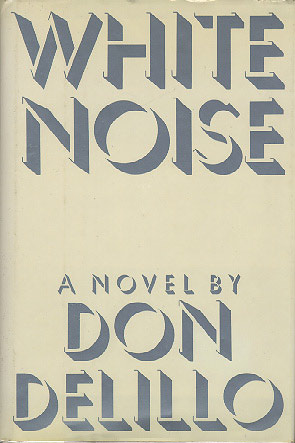
- 1st edition
- Author: Don DeLillo
- Language: English
- Genre: Postmodern novel
- Publisher: Viking Adult
- Publication date: January 21, 1985
- Publication place: United States
- Media type: Print (hardback & paperback)
- Pages: 326 pp (first hardcover)
- ISBN: 0-670-80373-1
- OCLC: 11067880
- Dewey Decimal: 813/.54 19
- LC Class: PS3554.E4425 W48 1985
- Preceded by: The Names
- Followed by: Libra

White Noise is the eighth novel by Don DeLillo, published by Viking Press in 1985. It won the U.S. National Book Award for Fiction.

White Noise is a cornerstone example of postmodern literature. It is widely considered DeLillo's breakout work and brought him to the attention of a much larger audience. The novel was included in Time's List of the 100 Best Novels. DeLillo originally wanted to call the book Panasonic, but the owner of the trademark Matsushita Electric Industrial Co., Ltd. (now Panasonic Holding Corporation), objected.

In late 2022, the novel was adapted by director Noah Baumbach into a film of the same name starring Adam Driver and Greta Gerwig.

== Plot ==
Set in the bucolic college town Blacksmith, White Noise follows a year in the life of Jack Gladney, a professor at the College-on-the-Hill who has made his name by pioneering the field of Hitler studies (though he has not taken German lessons until this year). He has been married five times to four women and rears a number of children and stepchildren (Heinrich, Denise, Steffie, Wilder, and Eugene, who is away in Australia with his biological father) with his current wife, Babette. Jack and Babette are both extremely afraid of death; they frequently wonder which of them will be the first to die. The first part of White Noise, called "Waves and Radiation," is a chronicle of contemporary family life combined with academic satire.

There is little plot development in this first section, which mainly serves as an introduction to the characters and themes which dominate the rest of the book. For instance, the mysterious deaths of men in "Mylex" (intended to suggest Mylar) suits and the ashen, shaken survivors of a plane that went into free fall anticipate the catastrophe of the book's second part. "Waves and Radiation" also introduces Murray Jay Siskind, Jack's friend and fellow college professor, who discusses theories about death, supermarkets, media, "psychic data", and other facets of contemporary American culture. Jack and Murray visit the most photographed barn in the world, discussing how its notoriety renders truly seeing the barn an impossibility, and later present an impromptu joint lecture juxtaposing the lives of Hitler and Elvis Presley.

In the second part of the novel, "The Airborne Toxic Event," a chemical spill from a rail car releases a black noxious cloud over Jack's home region, prompting an evacuation. Frightened by his exposure to the toxin (called Nyodene Derivative), Jack is forced to confront his mortality. An organization called SIMUVAC (short for "simulated evacuation") is also introduced in part two, an indication of simulations replacing reality.

In part three of the book, "Dylarama", Jack discovers that Babette has been cheating on him with a man she calls "Mr. Gray" in order to gain access to a fictional drug called Dylar, an experimental treatment for the terror of death. The novel becomes a meditation on modern society's fear of death and its obsession with chemical cures as Jack seeks to obtain his own black-market supply of Dylar. However, Dylar does not work for Babette, and it has many possible side effects, including losing the ability to "distinguish words from things, so that if someone said 'speeding bullet,' I would fall to the floor and take cover."

Jack continues to obsess over death. During a discussion about mortality, Murray suggests that killing someone could alleviate the fear. Jack decides to track down and kill Mr. Gray, whose real name, he has learned, is Willie Mink. After a black comedy scene of Jack driving and rehearsing, in his head, several ways in which their encounter might proceed, he successfully locates and shoots Willie, who at the time is in a delirious state caused by his own Dylar addiction.

Jack puts the gun in Willie's hand to make the murder look like a suicide, but Willie then shoots Jack in the arm. Suddenly realizing the needless loss of life, Jack carries Willie to a hospital run by German nuns who do not believe in God or an afterlife. Having saved Willie, Jack returns home to watch his children sleep.

The final chapter describes Wilder, Jack's youngest child, riding a tricycle across the highway and miraculously surviving. Jack, Babette, and Wilder join a crowd gathering to watch the brilliant sunset, possibly enhanced by the airborne toxic event, from an overpass, before Jack describes his avoidance of his doctor and the hypnotic and spiritual nature of the supermarket.

== Structure ==
White Noise is written in the first person through the eyes of the main character, Jack Gladney. Jack is middle-aged and overly concerns himself with the inevitability of death. The first-person perspective gives the audience the ability to see Jack's true thoughts and feelings. The majority of the novel is written in dialogue, primarily focusing on the interactions between the characters and Jack's interpretations. Author DeLillo purposefully creates Jack's dialogue to be philosophical. The diction is not complex, but rather the sentence structure of Jack's dialogue is complex. Jack's character's dialogue throughout the story provides a better meaning than the other characters'.

== Setting ==
White Noise begins in the college town of Blacksmith. The exact geographical setting of White Noise is unidentified, but elements of the novel evoke the Midwestern United States, especially the Rust Belt and Upper Midwest. The fictional Iron City shares its name with the Pittsburgh beer company of the same name. Critic John Pistelli wrote that a Midwestern setting was "thematically appropriate to the novel's concern with the vanishing of labor and laboring know-how."

== Characters ==
Jack Gladney is the protagonist and narrator of the novel. He is a professor of Hitler studies at a liberal arts college in middle America.

Babette is Jack's wife. They have seven children from previous marriages, and they are currently living with four of these children. Babette has an affair with Willie Mink, whom she calls Mr. Gray, in order to obtain Dylar.

Heinrich Gerhardt is the fourteen-year-old son of Jack and Janet Savory. He is precociously intellectual, prone to be contrary, and plays correspondence chess with an imprisoned mass murderer.

Denise is the eleven-year-old daughter of Babette and Bob Pardee. She suspects her mother is a drug addict and steals the bottle of Dylar to hide it.

Steffie is the nine-year-old daughter of Jack and Dana Breedlove. She is a hypochondriac.

Wilder is Babette's two-year-old son, and the youngest child in the family. Wilder is never quoted for dialogue in the novel (however, at one point, it is said that he asked for a glass of milk) and periodically Jack worries about the boy's slow linguistic development.

Bee is the twelve-year-old daughter of Jack and Tweedy Browner. She lived in South Korea for two years.

Dana Breedlove is Jack's first and fourth wife and the mother of Mary Alice and Steffie. She works part time for the CIA and conducts covert drop-offs in Latin America. She also writes book reviews.

Janet Savory is Jack's second wife and the mother of Heinrich. She manages the financial businesses of an ashram in Montana, where she is known as Mother Devi. Before that she worked as a foreign-currency analyst for a secret group of advanced theorists.

Tweedy Browner is Jack's third wife and the mother of Bee.

Mary Alice is the nineteen-year-old daughter of Dana Breedlove and Jack's first marriage.

Eugene is Babette's eight-year-old son who lives with his unnamed father in Western Australia. His father is also Wilder's father.

Murray Jay Siskind is a colleague of Jack's. He wants to create a field of study centered on Elvis Presley in the same way that Jack has created one around Hitler. He teaches a course on the cinema of car crashes, watches TV obsessively, and cheerfully theorizes about many subjects, including media saturation, mindfulness, and the meaning of supermarkets.

Orest Mercator is Heinrich's friend who trains to sit in a cage with vipers.

Vernon Dickey is Babette's father who visits the family in chapter 33 and gives Jack a gun.

Willie Mink is a compromised researcher who invents Dylar.

Winnie Richards is a scientist at the college where Jack works, to whom Jack goes for information about Dylar.

== Analysis ==
White Noise explores several themes that emerged during the mid-to-late twentieth century, e.g., rampant consumerism, media saturation, novelty academic intellectualism, underground conspiracies, the disintegration and reintegration of the family, human-made disasters, and the potentially regenerative nature of violence. The novel's style is characterized by a heterogeneity that utilizes "montages of tones, styles, and voices that have the effect of yoking together terror and wild humor as the essential tone of contemporary America."

== Themes ==
=== Death ===
A recurring question that Babette and Jack constantly battle is, "Who is going to die first?" Throughout the novel, Jack's low self-esteem is noticeable. Jack believes that he is a fraud and he would have no importance in death. He believes his academic career is insignificant. Jack's battle with his fear of death is a constant conflict throughout the book. Similarly, Babette also battles death but in a different way. Babette takes Dylar in order to forget about the fear of death, whereas Jack acknowledges what death is and his fear of it. Although the couple's fear of death is different, it also permeates their lives and causes them to experience insanity and obsession. In a meta commentary on the role of narrative plot in storytelling, Gladney, and the novel itself, assert that once a plot is set in motion it only moves "deathward". All courses of action that center around a plan ultimately end in death. The novel illustrates this through Jack's crippling fear, and its highly fragmented organization of events and chapters. This fragmentation stagnates the plot compared to the typical novel, and for Jack's purposes, keeps death at arm's length.

=== Academia ===
The novel is an example of academic satire, where the shortcomings of academia are ridiculed through irony or sarcasm. Critic Karen Weekes notes that the professors at University-on-the-Hill "fail to inspire respect" from their students and that "the university itself is 'trivialized by the nostalgic study of popular and youth culture'" by offering classes on Adolf Hitler, Elvis Presley, and cinematic car crashes. Critic Ian Finseth adds how "the academic profession ...[has a] tendency to divide up the world and all human experience." DeLillo uses Hitler Studies as a way for the characters to deal with complex information, enabling them to cope with the intricacies of their society.

Critic Stephen Schryer goes on to note the satirical way that characters in White Noise "lay claim to specialized knowledge that can be transmitted to others, regardless of their educational accomplishments or actual income". According to Schryer, the characters' vocations suggest "pseudo-professionalism", as if each can claim a professional expertise or outstanding intellect that "[renders] this class dependent on hyper-specialized forms of expertise." Critic David Alworth suggests that characters deal with unknowns like death via the "pseudo-professional"; they respond by pretending that they are educated to understand it.

=== Consumer culture ===
Ecocritic Cynthia Deitering has described the novel as central to the rise of "toxic consciousness" in American fiction in the 1980s, arguing that the novel "offers insight into a culture's shifting relation to nature and to the environment at a time when the imminence of ecological collapse was, and is, part of the public mind and of individual imagination." Alexander Davis has similarly made the argument that White Noise reflects humanity's changed relationship to nature as a result of rampant consumerism.

DeLillo critiques modern consumption by connecting identity to shopping in White Noise. In a 1993 interview, DeLillo states that there is a "consume or die" mentality in America, which is reflected in the novel. Characters in the novel try to avoid death through shopping. For example, Jack goes on a shopping spree where he is described as feeling more powerful with each purchase: "I traded money for goods. The more money I spent, the less important it seemed. I was bigger than these sums." Postmodern critic Karen Weekes expands on this idea and argues that Americans "consume and die"; even though Jack tries to avoid death through shopping, he can't. Life is represented by shopping and death is represented by checking out at the registers. Critic Ahmad Ghashmari addresses the connection between advertising's influence on shoppers and the world in White Noise by stating, "Shoppers are attracted to colors, sizes, and the packaging; the surface is what draws and grips their attentions and ignites their desires to buy items regardless of their need for them." According to Ghashmari, "The supermarket, with its spectacle of goods has effaced reality and replaced it with a hyper reality in which the surfaces replace the real products." The characters in White Noise shop in order to create their own identity and escape the fear of death. On the topic of consumerism, DeLillo himself states that "through products and advertising people attain an impersonal identity". In other words, because shoppers all buy the same products, they can't be unique.

Through the theme of technology, DeLillo demonstrates the effect media has on human behavior. Most critics agree that White Noise functions as a cautionary tale about high-tech America by focusing on the effects of technology on social relations. Critic Ahmad Ghashmari says, "TV is as important and influential as the protagonist of the novel... TV seems to control all people; they believe nothing but TV." He points to chapter 6 of the novel, explaining, "Heinrich refuses to trust his senses in observing the weather and chooses to believe the radio instead. He believes that all what is broadcast on the radio is true." One critic adds that television does not stop at molding the thoughts of DeLillo's characters, but more invasively, television and its advertising subliminally shape their unconscious behavior. For example, in chapter 21, Jack witnesses television's influence when he observes his daughter uttering "Toyota Celica" in her sleep. DeLillo has said that "there's a connection between the advances that are made in technology and the sense of primitive fear people develop in response to it." Critic John Frow connects the theme of technology to the greater postmodern theoretical issues the book addresses. He suggests that a second televised narrative is embedded within the narrative of the novel's plot through constant references to television's interjections. The world of White Noise is so saturated by television shows and other media messages that "it becomes increasingly difficult to separate primary actions from imitations of actions". Thoughts and actions are replaced by programmed responses, which have been learned.

Indeed, it is a world that seems determined by simulation which, according to Jean Baudrillard, is "the generation by models of a real without origin or reality: a hyperreal". This is illustrated, in the eyes of Haidar Eid of Rand Afrikaans University, by much of the imagery used to convey the incomprehensible reality of the Toxic Cloud and is explicitly thematized through Jack's conversation with the intake clerk from SIMUVAC which concludes Part 2 of the novel. Here Jack is told that even though the evacuation taking place is real, the SIMUVAC team is treating it "as a model" to be used to perfect the protocol they will use in future disaster simulations. In effect, the reality of "The Airborne Toxic Event" has been displaced by their performance in something like street theater. Such an ironic reversal of reader expectations is reinforced when the Simuvac Man further acknowledges that using "the real event in order to rehearse the simulation" has inherent difficulties and that "You have to make allowances for the fact that everything we see tonight is real." In Baudrillard's words, "It is no longer a question of imitation, nor of reduplication, nor even of parody. It is rather a question of substituting signs of the real for the real itself." That is why the Simuvac Man concludes his remarks by conceding that "There's a lot of polishing we still have to do. But that's what this exercise is all about." Such a substitution of the sign for the reality is what Baudrillard calls a simulacrum, and in White Noise this is emblematically represented by "the most photographed barn in America" which, according to Peter Knight, "has perhaps become the 'Most Discussed Scene in Postmodern Fiction'." Such a postmodern understanding is expressed by Murray when he declares that "No one sees the barn," for "Once you've seen the signs about the barn, it becomes impossible to see the barn." Created by photography and tourism, the barn is "a packaged perception, a 'sight'...not a 'thing'." Because as Murray explains "we've read the signs, seen the people snapping the pictures," the barn is a cultural reality which has what DeLillo calls an "aura". This aura, says Murray, prevents us from even speculating about what the "original" barn might have really been like because "We can't get outside the aura," and every photograph taken by the tourists only "reinforces the aura" of the barn. According to Frank Lentricchia, this loss of the referent, the dissolving of the object into its representations, lends the passage the status of a "primal scene", but one which is for Murray an occasion for celebration because it is a "technological transcendence" and "We're part of the aura. We're here, we're now."

=== Childhood ===
DeLillo also portrays the children as being smarter and more mature than the adults in White Noise. In a 1985 review of the novel in The New York Times, Jayne Anne Phillips noted, "Children, in the America of White Noise, are in general, more competent, more watchful, more in sync than their parents." These children have the composure normally expected of an adult, yet the parents have a constant sense of self-doubt that makes them appear immature and paranoid. A scholar from University of Washington, Tom Leclaire, adds to the argument by saying that children are the center of knowledge: "Gladney's children are making his family a center of learning." However, Joshua Little, of Georgia State University, provides a different point of view that "the possibility of transcendence through the innocence of children is hinted at in the novel". According to Little, in the context of the turn of the century, knowledge is connected to having a higher social standing. Adina Baya, a specialist in media communication, supports this idea as she points out that children during the 1980s had greater access to mass media and marketing than before.

=== Religion ===
DeLillo interprets religion in White Noise unconventionally, most notably drawing comparisons between Jack's local supermarket and a religious institution on several occasions. Critic Karen Weekes argues that religion in White Noise has "lost its quality" and that it is a "devaluation" of traditional belief in a superhuman power. According to critic Tim Engles, DeLillo portrays protagonist Jack Gladney as "formulating his own prayers and seeking no solace from higher authority". In addition, in the places the reader would expect to see religion, it is absent. Novelist and critic Joshua Ferris points out that "in a town like Blacksmith, the small midwestern university town of White Noise, the rites and rituals of traditional religion, such as church, bible study, and signs for Jesus, are expected". However, God is largely absent in this suburb. He adds, "The absence of religion is obvious, and places the novel in an entirely non-spiritual, post-Christian world. In White Noise, not even Catholic nuns believe in God." However, Professor Majeed Jadwe countered with, "White Noise begins and ends with a ritual. The first is the convoy of station wagons arriving for the new school year, which Jack describes as an event which he has not missed in 21 years. It ends with the public ritual of self-hood perfection." Professor Jadwe implies that although religion is not presented in the book, the concept of ritual is still present. Associate Director of Language and Writing, Christopher S. Glover, agreed by stating, "Just after the nun tells Jack that there exists nothing worth believing in and that anyone who does believe in something is a fool, DeLillo dangles this event in front of us, daring us to believe in something—anything—by using religious buzzwords such as 'mystical,' 'exalted,' and 'profound' but countering those words with others like 'lame-brained.'" DeLillo has stated that paranoia operates as a form of religious awe in his characters. He added that "[paranoia] is something old, a leftover from some forgotten part of the soul. And the intelligence agencies that create and service this paranoia are not interesting to me as spy handlers or masters of espionage. They represent old mysteries and fascinations, ineffable things. Central intelligence. They're like churches that hold the final secrets." Don DeLillo claims "Religion has not been a major element in my work, and for some years now I think the true American religion has been 'the American People.'"

== Film adaptation ==
The rights to film the novel were first acquired by HBO, and later by James L. Brooks's Gracie Films, and then again in 1999 by Sonnenfeld/Josephson with Barry Sonnenfeld set to direct, but the option lapsed. In 2016, Uri Singer acquired the rights and pushed the project into development.

In 2021, it was announced that Noah Baumbach would write and direct the film for Netflix, starring Adam Driver and Greta Gerwig.

== See also ==
- White noise
- The Airborne Toxic Event, an American rock band named after the book's second section
