= Robert Pattinson filmography =

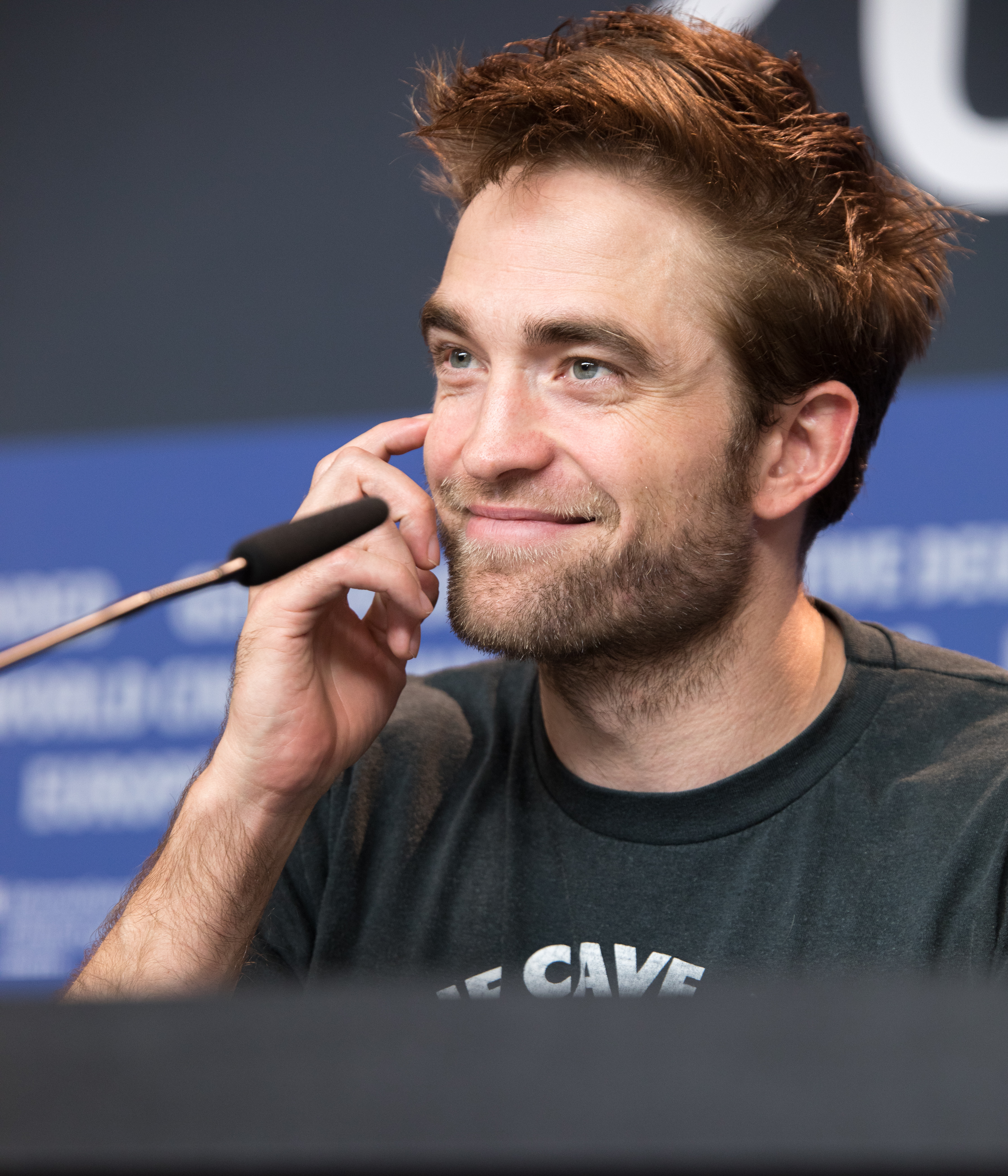
Pattinson at the press conference of Berlinale 2018

Robert Pattinson is an English actor and producer known for his work in a diverse range of characters from independent films to major studio features. He made early screen appearances in supporting roles, including in Vanity Fair (2004) and as Cedric Diggory in the fantasy film Harry Potter and the Goblet of Fire (2005), before achieving global recognition as Edward Cullen in The The Twilight Saga. Its five films—released yearly between 2008 and 2012—collectively grossed over $3.3 billion worldwide. In 2010, Pattinson executive-produced and starred in the coming-of-age romantic drama Remember Me (2010), The following year he portrayed Jacob Jankowski in Water for Elephants, a film adaptation of Sara Gruen's 2006 novel.

Pattinson gained critical acclaim for starring in David Cronenberg's drama Cosmopolis (2012), Werner Herzog's biographical film Queen of the Desert (2015), an adaptation of Gertrude Bell's life story, where he portrayed T. E. Lawrence, also known as Lawrence of Arabia alongside Nicole Kidman and James Franco. This was followed by James Gray's adventure drama The Lost City of Z (2016), in which he played the British explorer Corporal Henry Costin. In 2017, he starred as Connie Nikas, a bank robber navigating the criminal underworld of Queens, New York in Safdie brothers's crime drama Good Time, for which he earned nomination for the Independent Spirit Award for Best Male Lead. He then starred in Zellner Brothers' western-comedy Damsel as an eccentric cowboy embarking on a journey west in search of his kidnapped fiancée and Claire Denis's science fiction drama High Life, as a reluctant father.

In 2019, he starred in Robert Eggers's psychological horror The Lighthouse, which premiered at the Cannes Film Festival, and Ciro Guerra's poorly-received Waiting for the Barbarians, an adaptation of J. M. Coetzee's 1980 novel, alongside Mark Rylance and Johnny Depp. In the 2020s, Pattinson returned to big-budget mainstream cinema with starring roles in Christopher Nolan's action film Tenet (2020) and Matt Reeves's superhero film The Batman (2022) where he portrayed Batman and his secret alter ego. It was a commercial success, grossing over $772 million worldwide, making it the seventh-highest-grossing film of 2022. In 2026, Pattinson starred in multiple projects, his first release was alongside Zendaya in Kristoffer Borgli's romantic black comedy-drama film The Drama (2026), a box office success, followed by Nolan's epic action film The Odyssey as Antinous. The film has grossed $1.632 billion worldwide, becoming the second-highest-grossing film of 2026.

== Film ==
=== As an actor ===
Key
†	Denotes films that have not yet been released

Year	Title	Role	Notes	Ref.
2004	Vanity Fair	Adult Rawdy Crawley	Deleted scenes	
2005	Harry Potter and the Goblet of Fire	Cedric Diggory		
2008	How to Be	Art		
2008	Twilight	Edward Cullen		
2009	Little Ashes	Salvador Dalí		
2009	The Twilight Saga: New Moon	Edward Cullen		
2010	Remember Me	Tyler Hawkins		
2010	The Twilight Saga: Eclipse	Edward Cullen		
2010	Love & Distrust	Richard	Segment: The Summer House	
2011	Water for Elephants	Jacob Jankowski		
2011	The Twilight Saga: Breaking Dawn – Part 1	Edward Cullen		
2012	Bel Ami	Georges Duroy		
2012	Cosmopolis	Eric Packer		
2012	The Twilight Saga: Breaking Dawn – Part 2	Edward Cullen		
2014	The Rover	Reynolds		
2014	Maps to the Stars	Jerome Fontana		
2015	Queen of the Desert	T. E. Lawrence		
2015	Life	Dennis Stock		
2016	The Childhood of a Leader	Charles Marker / Adult Prescott		
2016	The Lost City of Z	Corporal Henry Costin		
2017	Good Time	Constantine "Connie" Nikas		
2017	Fear and Shame	Himself	Short film, also writer	
2018	Damsel	Samuel Alabaster		
2018	High Life	Monte		
2019	The Lighthouse	Ephraim Winslow / Thomas Howard		
2019	The King	Louis, Duke of Guyenne		
2019	Waiting for the Barbarians	Officer Mandel		
2020	Tenet	Neil		
2020	The Devil All the Time	Preston Teagardin		
2022	The Batman	Bruce Wayne / Batman		
2023	The Boy and the Heron	The Grey Heron	Voice; English dub	
2025	Mickey 17	Mickey Barnes		
2025	Die My Love	Jackson		
2025	Marty Supreme	British Open Commentator	Voice; uncredited	
2026	The Drama	Charlie Thompson		
2026	The Odyssey	Antinous		
2026	Primetime	Chris Hansen		
2026	Christian Dior's Night in Color	Narrator	Voice role; short film	
2026	Dune: Part Three †	Scytale	Post-production	
2027	The Take †	Noah	Post-production	
2028	The Batman: Part II †	Bruce Wayne / Batman	Filming	

=== As producer ===
Key
†	Denotes films that have not yet been released

Year	Title	Credit	Ref.
2010	Remember Me	Executive producer	
2023	Rotting in the Sun	Executive producer	
2025	Die My Love	Executive producer	
2025	Magic Farm	Executive producer	
2026	Primetime	Producer	
2027	Possession †	Producer	
TBA	The Chaperones †	Producer	
TBA	Shot in the Dark †	Producer	

== Television ==
Year	Title	Role	Notes	Ref.
2004	Dark Kingdom: The Dragon King	Giselher	Television film	
2006	The Haunted Airman	Toby Jugg	Television film	
2007	The Bad Mother's Handbook	Daniel Gale	Television film	

== Theatre ==
Year	Production	Role	Company	Credit	Notes	Ref.
1990s	Spell for a Rhyme	King of Hearts	Tower House School	Actor	School production in East Sheen; written by one of his teachers	
1990s	Lord of the Flies	Robert	Tower House School	Actor	School production	
Early 2000s	Guys and Dolls	Cuban dancer	Barnes Theatre Company	Actor	Non-speaking role; his first stage part with the company, after working backstage	
Early 2000s	Our Town	George Gibbs	Barnes Theatre Company	Actor	Lead role	
Early 2000s	Tess of the d'Urbervilles	Alec d'Urberville	Barnes Theatre Company	Actor	Sources differ on whether a talent agent first noticed him here or in Our Town	
Early 2000s	Anything Goes	Unknown	Barnes Theatre Company	Actor	Role not recorded in available sources	
2004	Macbeth	Malcolm	Barnes Theatre Company	Actor	OSO Arts Centre, Barnes; March 2004	
2005	The Woman Before	Andi	Royal Court Theatre	Actor (cast)	Replaced by Tom Riley before the production opened on 17 May 2005; early programmes and press notices still named Pattinson	
2026	The Holes	—N/a		Producer	Off-Broadway play	

== Discography ==
=== Soundtrack ===
Year	Title	Soundtrack	Ref.
2008	"Never Think"	Twilight	
2008	"Let Me Sign"	Twilight	
2009	"Chokin' on the Dust" (Part 1)	How to Be	
2009	"Chokin' on the Dust" (Part 2)	How to Be	
2009	"Doin' Fine"	How to Be	
2018	"Honeybun"	Damsel	
2019	"Willow" (with Tindersticks)	High Life	

=== Other credits ===
Year	Title	Album	Artist	Notes
2013	"Birds"	Government Plates	Death Grips	Played guitar

== See also ==
- List of awards and nominations received by Robert Pattinson
