= Leaving Circadia =

2014 American independent comedy-drama film

- Directed by: Evan Mathew Weinstein
- Written by: Evan Mathew Weinstein
- Story by: Regi Huc; Evan Mathew Weinstein
- Produced by: Jesse Tendler; Regi Huc; Drew Seltzer; Evan Mathew Weinstein
- Starring: Christian Coulson; Joseph R. Gannascoli; Stoya; Michael Cerveris; Winter Williams; Lindsay Felton; Drew Seltzer; Regi Huc; Evan Mathew Weinstein; Larisa Polonsky
- Cinematography: Vitaly Bokser
- Production company: Main Line Films
- Release date: 2014
- Country: United States
- Language: English

Leaving Circadia is a 2014 American independent comedy-drama film written and directed by Evan Mathew Weinstein. Set in Brooklyn, the film stars Christian Coulson, Michael Cerveris, and Joseph R. Gannascoli. It follows a group of men living in a brownstone as they navigate the transition from their twenties into adulthood.

== Release ==
The film premiered in 2014, serving as the opening night feature for the New Jersey Film Festival and the First Glance Film Festival. Following its festival run, the film secured domestic distribution through Stonecutter Media. In 2015, it was released via VOD on platforms including Verizon FiOS and Charter Communications. As of 2024, the film is available for streaming on Amazon Prime Video.

== Production ==
On November 6, 2014, it was confirmed that the film was set to feature Larisa Polonsky, Joseph R. Gannascoli, Christian Coulson, Michael Cerveris and Winter Williams. The film received a positive review from Cinefunk.

== Reception ==
Critical response to Leaving Circadia was generally positive. Critic John Hanlon gave the film 3.5/5 stars, praising its "knowing look" at adulthood. CinemaFunk highlighted the film's relatability while noting its independent production values.

== Awards and nominations ==
Leaving Circadia received numerous accolades on the film festival circuit:

- Won, Best Feature Film – Manhattan Film Festival (2015)
- Won, Best Actress (Larisa Polonsky) – Long Beach International Film Festival (2014)
- Won, Verizon People's Choice Award – Emerge Film Festival (2014)
- Won, Best in Festival and Best Director – Emerge Film Festival (2014)
- Won, Director's Choice Award – Indie Spirit Awards (2014)
- Won, Best in Fest and Audience Choice – 17th Annual First Glance Film Festival (2014)
- Won, Audience Choice Award – VOB International Film Festival (2014)
- Won, Jury Prize (Best Feature Film) – Fort Myers Film Festival (2015)
- Nominated, Grand Jury Award (Best Showcase Feature) – Soho International Film Festival (2015)
