= Drew Seltzer =

American actor and producer

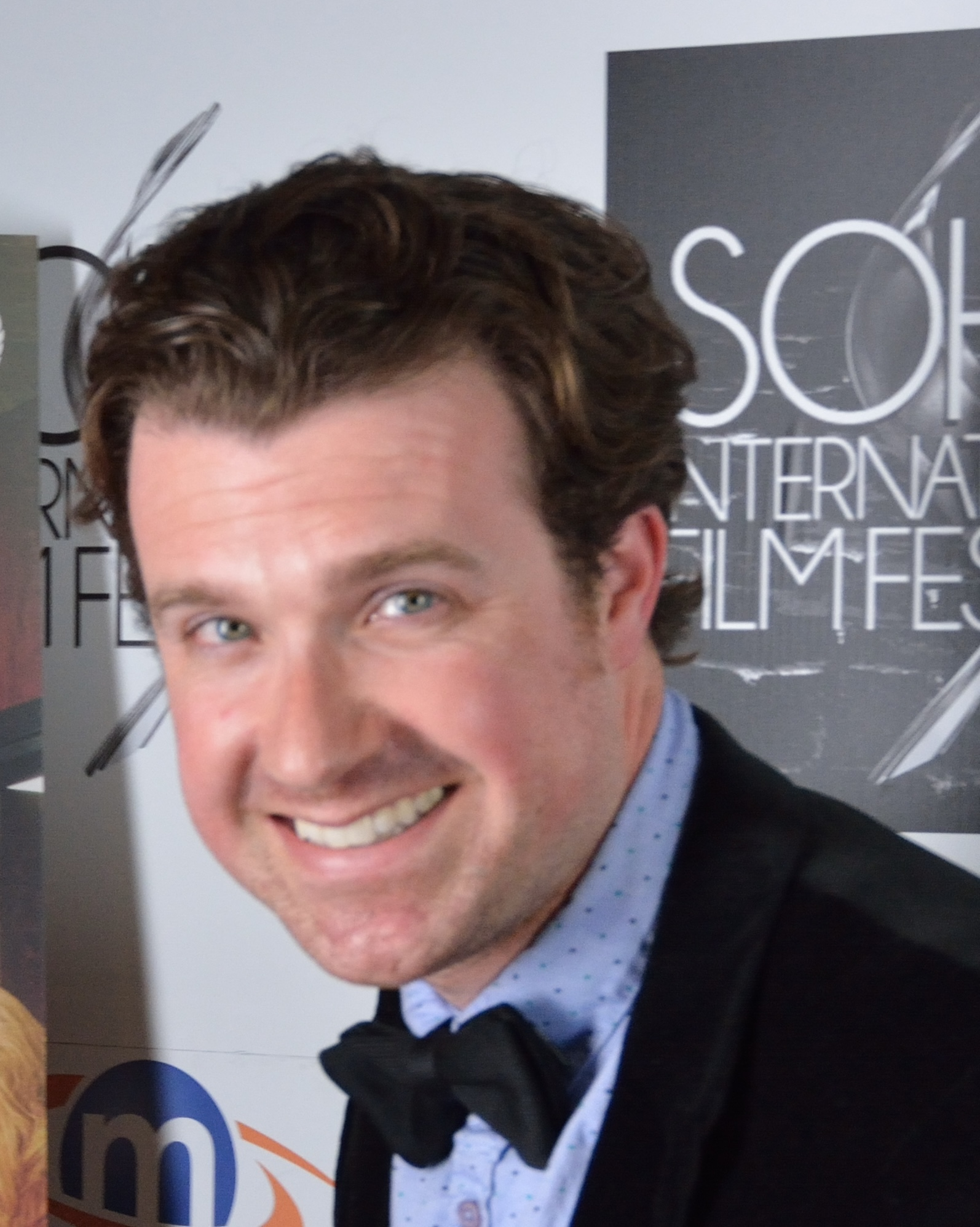
- Seltzer at the Soho International Film Festival 2015
- Born: June 16, 1981 (age 45); Media, Pennsylvania, U.S.
- Education: Rutgers University
- Years active: 2000–present
- Spouse: Tiffany-Leigh Moskow (m. 2014)
- Children: 2

Drew Seltzer (born June 16, 1981) is an American actor and producer. He portrayed the recurring role of Dale Harmon in the Netflix series Mindhunter and appeared in the television series Elsbeth and FBI.

In film, he portrayed Ray in the independent drama Leaving Circadia (2014), which he also executive produced, and appeared in the Focus Features film Never Rarely Sometimes Always. In 2026, he was cast as David McConaughy in the Civil War drama Gettysburg 1863.

== Early life and education ==
Seltzer grew up in Media, Pennsylvania, and attended The Shipley School in Bryn Mawr, before graduating from Penncrest High School. He developed an early interest in acting during his teens through his involvement with Hedgerow Theatre in Rose Valley, Pennsylvania, where he appeared in numerous stage productions and later became a resident actor. He continued his formal training at Rutgers University, earning a Bachelor of Fine Arts degree and studied improvisation at The Second City. During his senior year, he studied at Shakespeare’s Globe Theatre in London while Sir Mark Rylance was serving as the Globe’s artistic director.

== Career ==
=== Film ===
Seltzer made his feature film debut in The Men Who Stare at Goats (2009). In 2014, he executive produced and starred in the independent film Leaving Circadia. The film's premiere at the New Jersey Film Festival was profiled by NJ.com. The film won Directors Choice at Indie Spirit, Best in Festival at the First Glance Film Festival, and the Verizon People's Choice award at Emerge Film Festival.

He later appeared as Rick in the drama Never Rarely Sometimes Always, directed by Eliza Hittman. The film was reviewed by publications including IndieWire, winning jury awards at the Sundance Film Festival before being distributed by Focus Features.

In 2026, Deadline Hollywood reported that Seltzer was cast as David McConaughy in the Civil War film Gettysburg 1863, alongside Stephen Lang, Jake Busey, and Bruce Boxleitner. His role was the subject of a profile by The Gettysburg Times.

=== Television ===
In 2019, Seltzer appeared in a recurring role as Dale Harmon in the Netflix series Mindhunter. Working under the direction of David Fincher, Seltzer portrayed the neighbor of protagonist Bill Tench across multiple episodes. Following this, he later had guest roles in the CBS police procedural FBI, and in 2025, Seltzer appeared in the CBS series Elsbeth as Patrick Palmer.

=== Theater ===
Seltzer has performed Off-Broadway and in regional theater. In 2004, he was a member of the original cast of The Franklin Thesis, produced by the Tony Awards nominated theater company Les Freres Corbusier. Directed by Alex Timbers, the production premiered at the New Ohio Theatre as part of The Ice Factory Festival.

Seltzer's Off-Broadway credits also include an eight-year tenure in the interactive comedy Tony n' Tina's Wedding, performing at the St. Luke's Theatre on 46th Street in Manhattan's theater district of Times Square.

Regionally, Seltzer has appeared with East Lynne Theater Company in productions of Dulcy, The World Of Dorothy Parker and Berkeley Square. He has also worked with the company Theater with a View, where he starred as Howie in a 2017 production of Rabbit Hole. His performance was part of an ensemble described by The Philadelphia Inquirer as "superb" and a "gem of the season." Reviewing the production for Broad Street Review, critic Mark Cofta praised Seltzer's portrayal of Howie.

== Filmography ==
=== Film ===
Year	Title	Role	Notes
2009	The Men Who Stare at Goats	Technician	
2014	Leaving Circadia	Ray	Also executive producer
2020	Never Rarely Sometimes Always	Rick	
2026	Gettysburg 1863	David McConaughy	

=== Television ===
Year	Title	Role	Notes
2019	Mindhunter	Dale Harmon	Recurring
2025	Elsbeth	Patrick Palmer	Guest role
2025	FBI	Bill Lawson	Guest role
