= 2008 Slamdance Film Festival =

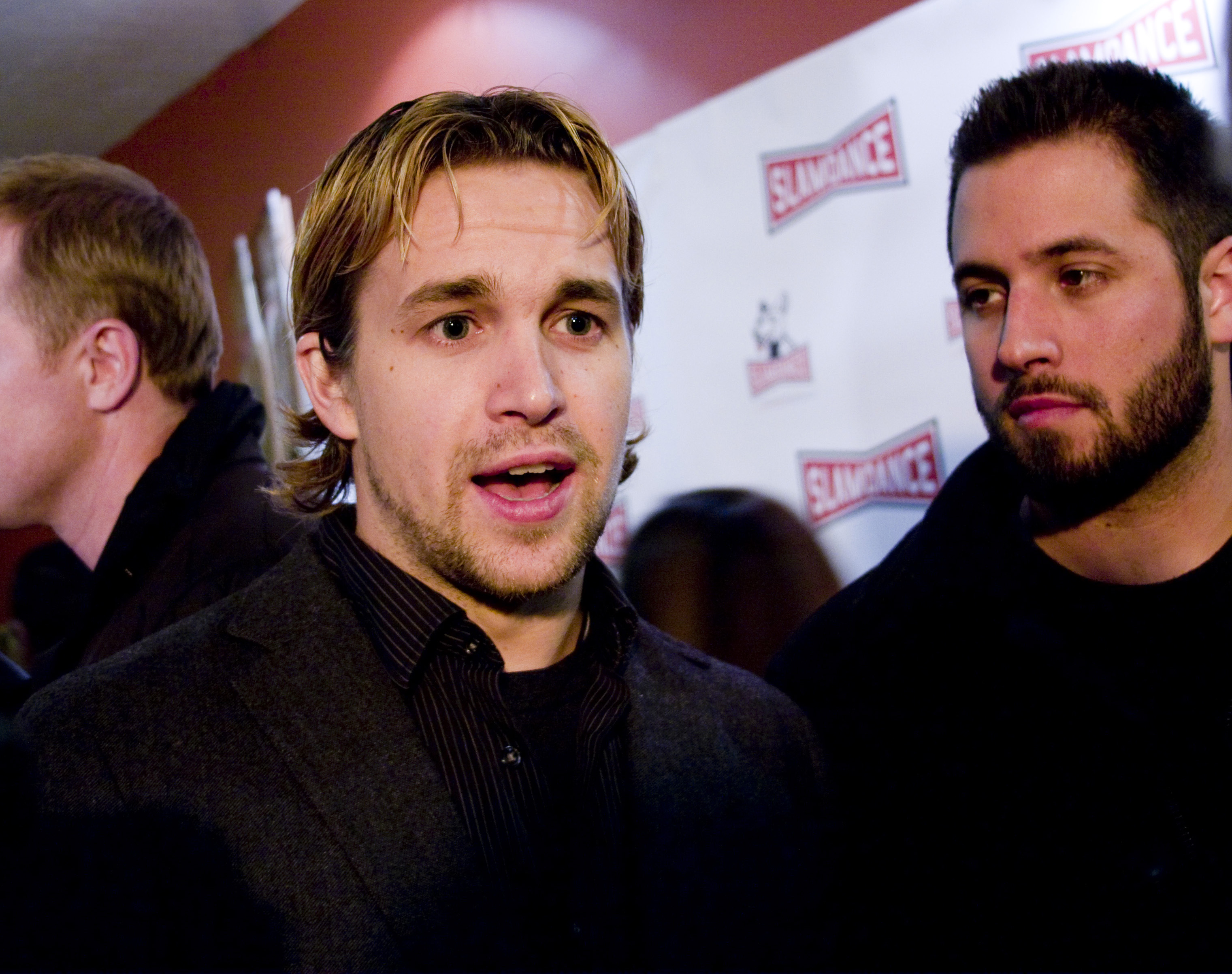
Cloverfield star Michael Stahl-David (center-left) at the 2008 Festival

The 2008 Slamdance Film Festival took place in Park City, Utah from January 17 to January 25, 2008. It was the 14th iteration of the Slamdance Film Festival, an alternative to the more mainstream Sundance Film Festival.

The Festival received over 3,500 submissions from 25 countries for less than 100 slots.

== Awards ==
The 2008 Slamdance Film Festival recognized the following films at its awards ceremony. The Grand Jury Narrative Feature and Documentary Feature Award winners will be screened at the IFC Center in New York City in February 2008. Only first-time filmmakers working with production budgets of $1 million or less were allowed to compete in Feature competition. The winners shared more than $200,000 in cash and prizes, and one winner won guaranteed production of a feature film.

Award name	Film title	Award Recipient
Grand Jury Award for Best Narrative Feature	The New Year Parade	Tom Quinn
Special Jury Honorable Mention for Narrative Feature	How To Be	Oliver Irving
Grand Jury Award for Best Documentary Feature	Song Sung Blue	Greg Kohs
Special Jury Honorable Mention for Documentary Feature	My Mother's Garden	Cynthia Lester
Grand Jury Award for Best Animated Short	Blood Will Tell	Andrew McPhillips
Grand Jury Award for Best Documentary Short	The Ladies	C.A. Voros
Grand Jury Award for Best Experimental Short	Doxology	Michael Langan
Grand Jury Award for Best Narrative Short	Son	Daniel Mulloy
Special Jury Honorable Mention for Narrative Short	4960	Wing-Yee Wu
Audience Award for Best Narrative Feature	The Project	Ryan Piotrowicz
Audience Award for Best Documentary Feature	Song Sung Blue	Greg Kohs
Spirit of Slamdance Award	Woman in Burka	Jonathan Lisecki
Award for Best Feature Length Screenplay	The Wonder Girls	Anthony Meindl
Award for Best Short Screenplay	Easy Pickins	Will Hartman
Award for Best Teleplay	Stage Six Pandemic	Barbara Marshall
Award for Best Horror Competition Screenplay	The Punished	Tony Mosher
Creative Excellence Award for the Horror Screenplay Competition	Child in the Dark	Damian Lahey and Ian Ogden
Kodak Vision Award for Best Cinematography	Crooked Lake (programmed as Portage)	Sascha Drews and Ezra Krybus

== Films ==
Films that premiered at the festival included Dear Zachary: A Letter to a Son About His Father, a documentary about the murder of Zachary Turner.

The screening of 2007 horror film Paranormal Activity marked a key step in the film's journey from indie horror movie to cultural phenomenon.
