= List of awards and nominations received by Charlton Heston =

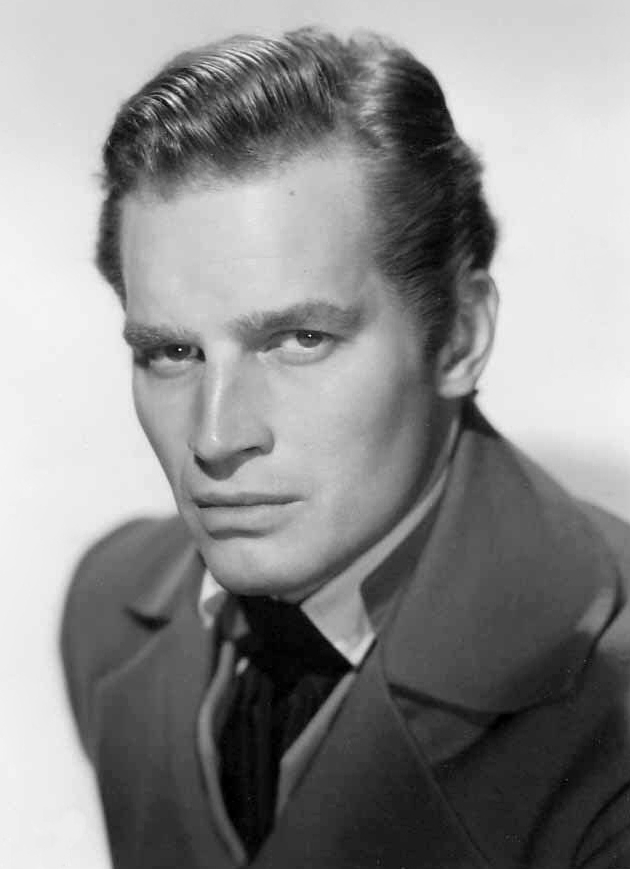
Charlton Heston in 1953

This article is a List of awards and nominations received by Charlton Heston

Charlton Heston was an American actor. He won the Academy Award as well as nominations for three Golden Globe Awards, and three Primetime Emmy Awards. He had numerous honorary accolades including the Jean Hersholt Humanitarian Award in 1978, the Golden Globe Cecil B. DeMille Award in 1967, the Screen Actors Guild Life Achievement Award in 1971, the Kennedy Center Honors in 1997, and the Presidential Medal of Freedom in 2003.

== Major associations ==
=== Academy Awards ===
Year	Category	Nominated work	Result	Ref.
1959	Best Actor	Ben-Hur	Won	
1977	Jean Hersholt Humanitarian Award		Won	

=== Emmy Awards ===
Year	Category	Nominated work	Result	Ref.
Primetime Emmy Awards
1952	Outstanding Lead Actor in a Drama Series	Studio One in Hollywood	Nominated	
1953	Outstanding Lead Actor in a Drama Series	Studio One in Hollywood	Nominated	
1996	Outstanding Informational Special	Andersonville Diaries	Nominated	

=== Golden Globe Awards ===
Year	Category	Nominated work	Result	Ref.
1956	Best Actor – Drama	The Ten Commandments	Nominated	
1959	Best Actor – Drama	Ben-Hur	Nominated	
1962	Henrietta Award		Won	
1963	Best Actor – Comedy or Musical	The Pigeon That Took Rome	Nominated	
1967	Cecil B. DeMille Award		Won	

=== Screen Actors Guild Awards ===
Year	Category	Nominated work	Result	Ref.
1972	Screen Actors Guild Life Achievement Award		Won	

== Miscellaneous accolades ==
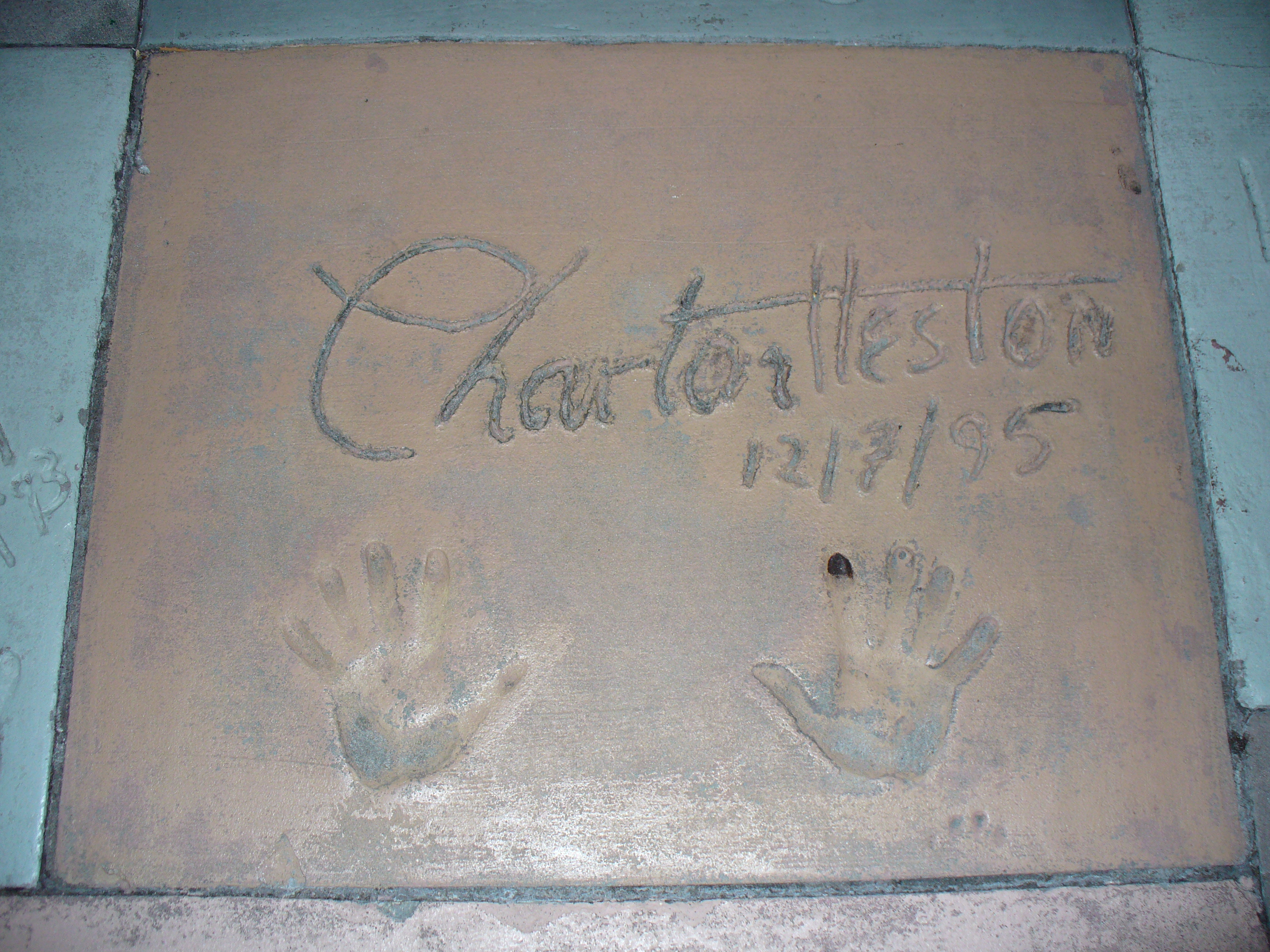
The handprints of Charlton Heston in front of The Great Movie Ride at Walt Disney World's Disney's Hollywood Studios theme park

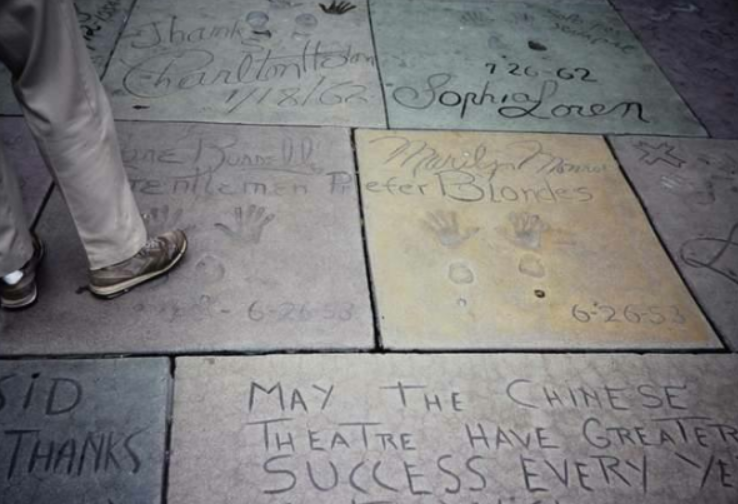
Heston's handprints and footprints at Grauman's Chinese Theatre

=== Bambi Award ===
Year	Category	Project	Results	Ref.
1959	Best Actor – International	Ben-Hur	Nominated	
1962	Best Actor – International	El Cid	Nominated	
1963	Best Actor – International	The Pigeon That Took Rome	Won	

=== David di Donatello Award ===
Year	Category	Project	Results	Ref.
1959	Best Foreign Actor	Ben-Hur	Won	

=== Fotogramas de Plata Award ===
Year	Category	Project	Results	Ref.
1956	Best Foreign Performer	The Ten Commandments	Won	

=== Golden Apple Award ===
Year	Category	Project	Results	Ref.
1956	Most Cooperative Actor		Won	
1963	Most Cooperative Actor		Nominated	
1982	Sour Apple		Nominated	

=== Golden Raspberry Award ===
Year	Category	Project	Results	Ref.
2002	Worst Supporting Actor	Cats & Dogs / Planet of the Apes / Town & Country	Won	

=== Laurel Awards ===
Year	Category	Project	Results	Ref.
1957	Top Male Dramatic Performance	The Ten Commandments	Won	
1959	Top Male Dramatic Performance	Ben-Hur	Nominated	
1962	Top Male Star		Nominated	
1963	Top Male Star		Nominated	
1964	Top Action Performance	55 Days at Peking	Nominated	
1965	Male Star		Nominated	
1968	Male Star		Nominated	

=== MTV Movie + TV Award ===
Year	Category	Project	Results	Ref.
2002	Best Cameo	Planet of the Apes	Nominated	

=== Western Heritage Award ===
Year	Category	Project	Results	Ref.
1969	Theatrical Motion Picture	Will Penny	Won	
2010	Theatrical Motion Picture	Hall of Great Western Performers	Won	

=== Saturn Award ===
Year	Category	Project	Results	Ref.
1975	Special Saturn Award		Won	

=== Soap Opera Digest Award ===
Year	Category	Project	Results	Ref.
1986	Outstanding Lead Actor in a Prime Time Serial	The Colbys	Nominated	
1988	Outstanding Lead Actor in a Prime Time Serial	The Colbys	Nominated	

== Honorary accolades ==
Year	Association	Category	Results
1959	Walk of Fame Star	1628 Hollywood, Blvd. – Motion Picture	Received
1967	Golden Globe Cecil B. DeMille Award	Lifetime Achievement Award	Received
1984	ShoWest Convention Award	Lifetime Achievement Award	Received
1997	Kennedy Center Honors	Lifetime Achievement Gala	Received
2003	Presidential Medal of Freedom	Honorary Medal	Received
2003	Long Beach International Film Festival Award	Lifetime Achievement Award	Received
