= Michael Irving =

English actor (born 1943)

Michael Irving (born 19 October 1943, in Ipswich, Suffolk) is an English stage and screen actor.

In 1972 he was one of the co-founders of the Half Moon Theatre with Maurice Colbourne and Guy Sprung. It became the Half Moon Young People's Theatre in 1990, a specialist theatre for young people. He performed in many productions there, including In the Jungle of the Cities, Will Wat, If Not, What Will?, Sawdust Caesar, Silver Tassie, Alkestis, The Mother and Female Transport. He directed and performed in Heroes of the Iceberg Hotel and Dan Dare (which he also wrote). In 1977 he played the Dame in Dick Whittington, or the City of Fear. In 2016 Michael became a patron of Half Moon Theatre (previously called Half Moon Young People's Theatre). This coincided with the launch of Stages of Half Moon, a digital archive of the theatre's history.

In the theatre, his work includes performances in the plays Apart from George and Rough Music in London. His film and television work includes the film Personal Services (1987), playing a headmaster in an episode of The Bill, and playing the father of Robert Pattinson's character in How to Be.

From 1971 to 1981 Irving was married to Veronica Hamel.
