= Andrew McPhillips =

- Born: England
- Education: R.I.T. Rochester New York (Graduate studies on MFA program); BA in photography, film and television from Salisbury College of Art. England
- Occupations: Film director, producer, CGI Artist
- Awards: Blood Will Tell (2007); Grand Jury Prize as Best Animated Short at the 2008 Slamdance Film Festival; Selected for 2007 Toronto International Film Festival
- Website: http://www.strangelightstudios.com

Andrew McPhillips is a British film director and computer graphics supervisor.

== Film career ==
Andrew has a background in film and photography. His professional experience includes a five-year stint at PDI/DreamWorks, where he worked on films such as Shrek 2, Minority Report and Artificial Intelligence: AI. More recently, he's been working as a Computer Graphics Supervisor at animation studios such as Sony Picture Imageworks, Method Studios, The Moving Picture Company, Toonbox Entertainment and LAIKA, working on a number of films including The Maze Runner, Hotel Transylvania 2 and The Great Gatsby.

His short film Blood Will Tell was invited to World Première at the 2007 Toronto International Film Festival. The short film had a lot of success in the festival circuit, eventually winning the coveted, Grand Jury Award at Slamdance Film Festival.

The year long festival screenings culminated in Blood Will Tell being selected for a prestigious four week, exclusive run at the IFC Film Center in New York. Held in Park City, Utah. He received a $2,500 credit at Filmworks/FX for winning the Slamdance Grand Jury award.
