= List of awards and nominations received by Robert Pattinson =

Robert Pattinson awards and nominations
- Pattinson at a Press Conference for Berlinale in 2017
Awards and nominations
Award	Wins	Nominations

Totals (Note: Certain award groups do not simply award one winner. They acknowledge several different recipients, have runners-up, and have third place. Since this is a specific recognition and is different from losing an award, runner-up mentions are considered wins in this award tally. For simplification and to avoid errors, each award in this list has been presumed to have had a prior nomination.)
- Wins: 54
- Nominations: 88

Robert Pattinson is an English actor and producer. He is known for his starring roles in franchise films and independent dramas. He has received various accolades including for 10 MTV Movie Awards, three Nickelodeon Kids' Choice Awards, two People's Choice Awards and 11 Teen Choice Awards as well as nominations for two Critics' Choice Awards, two Gotham Awards, and two Independent Spirit Awards.

Pattinson made his film debut in 2005 before playing Cedric Diggory in the Mike Newell directed fantasy film Harry Potter and the Goblet of Fire (2004). He then starred in the independent drama How to Be (2008) earning a Strasbourg Film Festival Best Actor Prize. He then gained international stardom for his portrayal of Edward Cullen in the vampire fantasy romance The Twilight Saga film series (2008–2012) for which he won 10 MTV Movie Awards, three Nickelodeon Kids Choice Awards, two People's Choice Awards and 12 Teen Choice Awards. He played an animal trainer for a circus in the romance Water for Elephants (2011) for which he won the Teen Choice Award.

He then took a dramatic role in the David Cronenberg directed drama Cosmopolis (2012) earning a nomination for the Vancouver Film Critics Circle Award. He played an American southerner in the David Michôd directed dystopian western The Rover (2014) for which he was nominated for the AACTA Award for Best Actor in a Supporting Role. He reunited with Cronenberg playing a struggling actor in the satirical black comedy Maps to the Stars (2014) earning a Canadian Screen Award for Best Supporting Actor nomination. The following year he portrayed Dennis Stock in the Anton Corbijn directed biographical drama Life (2015) winning the Hollywood Rising Star Award from the Deauville American Film Festival.

He earned critical acclaim for his performances as a small-time criminal in the Safdie brothers crime drama Good Time (2017) and an assistant lighthouse keeper in the Robert Eggers directed psychological drama The Lighthouse (2020) both of which earned him nominations for the Independent Spirit Award for Best Male Lead. For his role in the Christopher Nolan directed science-fiction spy film Tenet (2020) he was nominated for the Saturn Award for Best Supporting Actor. He earned Critics' Choice Super Award nominations for Best Actor in a Superhero Movie for playing Batman / Bruce Wayne in the Matt Reeves directed superhero film The Batman (2022) and for Best Actor in a Science Fiction/Fantasy Movie for playing multiple characters in the Bong Joon-Ho dystopian satire Mickey 17 (2025).

== Awards and nominations ==
Organizations	Year	Category	Work	Result	Ref.
Australian Academy Film Awards	2014	Best Supporting Actor	The Rover	Nominated	
BBC Radio 1 Teen Awards	2010	Best Actor	The Twilight Saga: Eclipse	Won	
BBC Radio 1 Teen Awards	2010	Best Dressed	The Twilight Saga: Eclipse	Won	
Bravo Otto Awards	2008	Best Actor	Twilight	Won	
Bravo Otto Awards	2011	Best Male Film Star	The Twilight Saga: Breaking Dawn – Part 1	Won	
Bravo Otto Awards	2012	Best Male Film Star	The Twilight Saga: Breaking Dawn – Part 2	Won	
Canadian Screen Awards	2014	Best Actor in a Supporting Role	Maps to the Stars	Nominated	
CinEuphoria Awards	2011	Best Actor – International Competition	Remember Me	Won	
Deauville American Film Festival	2015	Hollywood Rising Star Award	Life	Won	
Empire Awards	2009	Best Newcomer	Twilight	Nominated	
Empire Awards	2010	Best Actor	The Twilight Saga: New Moon	Nominated	
Empire Cinema Alternative Movie Awards	2013	Best On-Screen Couple ^{$}	The Twilight Saga: Breaking Dawn – Part 2	Won	
Empire Cinema Alternative Movie Awards	2013	Best On-Screen Kiss ^{$}	The Twilight Saga: Breaking Dawn – Part 2	Won	
First Glance Film Festival	2009	Best Actor	How to Be	Won	
Hollywood Film Awards	2011	Hollywood Film Award for New Hollywood	Twilight	Won	
Gotham Awards	2017	Best Actor	Good Time	Nominated	
Gotham Awards	2026	Best Feature^{€}	Primetime	Nominated	
Independent Spirit Awards	2018	Best Male Lead	Good Time	Nominated	
Independent Spirit Awards	2020	Best Male Lead	The Lighthouse	Nominated	
Strasbourg Film Festival	2008	Best Actor	How to Be	Won	
Savannah Film Festival	2017	Maverick Award	Good Time	Won	
Director's Cut Awards	2025	Best Actor – Film	Mickey 17	Nominated	
Golden Raspberry Awards	2009	Worst Supporting Actor	The Twilight Saga: New Moon	Nominated	
Golden Raspberry Awards	2009	Worst Screen Couple^{†}	The Twilight Saga: New Moon	Nominated	
Golden Raspberry Awards	2010	Worst Actor	Remember Me and The Twilight Saga: Eclipse	Nominated	
Golden Raspberry Awards	2010	Worst Screen Couple / Screen Ensemble^{λ}	The Twilight Saga: Eclipse	Nominated	
Golden Raspberry Awards	2011	Worst Screen Couple^{†}	The Twilight Saga: Breaking Dawn – Part 1	Nominated	
Golden Raspberry Awards	2011	Worst Screen Ensemble^{β}	The Twilight Saga: Breaking Dawn – Part 1	Nominated	
Golden Raspberry Awards	2012	Worst Actor	The Twilight Saga: Breaking Dawn – Part 2	Nominated	
Golden Raspberry Awards	2012	Worst Screen Couple^{$}	The Twilight Saga: Breaking Dawn – Part 2	Nominated	
Golden Raspberry Awards	2012	Worst Screen Ensemble^{β}	The Twilight Saga: Breaking Dawn – Part 2	Won	
MTV Movie Awards	2009	Breakthrough Performance Male	Twilight	Won	
MTV Movie Awards	2009	Best Kiss ^{$}	Twilight	Won	
MTV Movie Awards	2009	Best Fight ^{ρ}	Twilight	Won	
MTV Movie Awards	2010	Best Male Performance	The Twilight Saga: New Moon	Won	
MTV Movie Awards	2010	Global Superstar	The Twilight Saga: New Moon	Won	
MTV Movie Awards	2010	Best Kiss ^{$}	The Twilight Saga: New Moon	Won	
MTV Movie Awards	2011	Best Male Performance	The Twilight Saga: Eclipse	Won	
MTV Movie Awards	2011	Best Kiss ^{$}	The Twilight Saga: Eclipse	Won	
MTV Movie Awards	2011	Best Fight ^{δ}	The Twilight Saga: Eclipse	Won	
MTV Movie Awards	2012	Best Kiss ^{$}	The Twilight Saga: Breaking Dawn – Part 1	Won	
MTV Movie Awards	2022	Best Performance	The Batman	Nominated	
MTV Movie Awards	2022	Best Kiss ^{A}	The Batman	Nominated	
Nickelodeon Kids' Choice Awards	2010	Cutest Couple ^{$}	The Twilight Saga: New Moon	Nominated	
Nickelodeon Kids' Choice Awards	2010	Couple of the Year ^{$}	The Twilight Saga: Eclipse	Won	
Nickelodeon Kids' Choice Awards	2010	Fave Kiss ^{$}	The Twilight Saga: Eclipse	Nominated	
Nickelodeon Kids' Choice Awards	2010	Fave Movie Star	The Twilight Saga: Eclipse	Nominated	
Nickelodeon Kids' Choice Awards	2012	Favourite UK Actor	The Twilight Saga: Breaking Dawn – Part 2	Won	
Nickelodeon Kids' Choice Awards	2013	Favourite UK Actor	The Twilight Saga: Breaking Dawn – Part 2	Won	
People's Choice Awards	2009	Favorite On-Screen-Team ^{†}	Twilight	Won	
People's Choice Awards	2009	Favorite Movie Actor	Twilight	Nominated	
People's Choice Awards	2010	Favorite Movie Actor	The Twilight Saga: Eclipse	Nominated	
People's Choice Awards	2010	Favorite On-Screen-Team ^{†}	The Twilight Saga: Eclipse	Won	
People's Choice Awards	2011	Favorite Movie Actor	Water for Elephants	Nominated	
Rembrandt Awards	2012	Best International Actor	Water for Elephants	Nominated	
Richard Attenborough Film Awards	2012	Film Star of the Year	The Twilight Saga: Breaking Dawn – Part 1	Won	
Richard Attenborough Film Awards	2013	Best British Performance of the Year	The Twilight Saga: Breaking Dawn – Part 2	Won	
Russia's Georges Awards	2010	Russia's Georges Award for Best Foreign Actor	The Twilight Saga: New Moon	Won	
Scream Awards	2010	Best Fantasy Actor	Twilight	Won	
Scream Awards	2010	Scream Award for Best Ensemble^{γ}	Twilight	Nominated	
Scream Awards	2010	Best Fantasy Actor	The Twilight Saga: Eclipse	Won	
Satellite Awards	2018	Best Actor	Good Time	Nominated	
Saturn Awards	2021	Best Supporting Actor	Tenet	Nominated	
Saturn Awards	2022	Best Actor	The Batman	Nominated	
Teen Choice Awards	2009	Choice Movie Actor: Drama	Twilight	Won	
Teen Choice Awards	2009	Choice Hottie	Twilight	Won	
Teen Choice Awards	2009	Movie Liplock ^{$}	Twilight	Won	
Teen Choice Awards	2009	Choice Movie Rumble ^{ρ}	Twilight	Won	
Teen Choice Awards	2010	Movie Liplock ^{$}	The Twilight Saga: New Moon	Won	
Teen Choice Awards	2010	Movie Chemistry ^{$}	The Twilight Saga: New Moon	Won	
Teen Choice Awards	2010	Choice Movie Actor Fantasy	The Twilight Saga: New Moon	Nominated	
Teen Choice Awards	2010	Choice Hottie	The Twilight Saga: New Moon	Nominated	
Teen Choice Awards	2010	Choice Movie Actor Drama	Remember Me	Won	
Teen Choice Awards	2010	Choice Summer Movie Star – Male	The Twilight Saga: Eclipse	Won	
Teen Choice Awards	2011	Choice Vampire	The Twilight Saga: Eclipse	Won	
Teen Choice Awards	2011	Choice Actor – Drama	Water for Elephants	Won	
Teen Choice Awards	2012	Choice Hottie	The Twilight Saga: Breaking Dawn – Part 1	Nominated	
Teen Choice Awards	2012	Choice Movie Actor Sci-Fi/Fantasy	The Twilight Saga: Breaking Dawn – Part 1	Nominated	
Teen Choice Awards	2012	Movie Liplock ^{$}	The Twilight Saga: Breaking Dawn – Part 1	Nominated	
Teen Choice Awards	2012	Movie Actor Romance	The Twilight Saga: Breaking Dawn – Part 1	Nominated	
Teen Choice Awards	2013	Movie Actor Romance	The Twilight Saga: Breaking Dawn – Part 2	Nominated	
Teen Choice Awards	2013	Choice Movie Actor Sci-Fi/Fantasy	The Twilight Saga: Breaking Dawn – Part 2	Nominated	
Teen Choice Awards	2013	Movie Liplock ^{$}	The Twilight Saga: Breaking Dawn – Part 2	Won	
Virgin Media Awards	2013	Hottest Movie Actor	The Twilight Saga: Breaking Dawn – Part 2	Won	

== Critics' awards ==
Year	Nominated work	Category	Result	Ref.
Alliance of Women Film Journalists
2011	The Twilight Saga: Breaking Dawn – Part 1	EDA Special Mention Award	Won	
Austin Film Critics Association Awards
2017	Good Time	Best Actor	Nominated	
Australian Film Critics Association Awards
2014	The Rover	Best Supporting Actor	Nominated	
Central Ohio Film Critics Association
2020	The Lighthouse	Best Actor	Nominated	
Critics' Choice Super Awards
2023	The Batman	Best Actor in a Superhero Movie	Nominated	
2025	Mickey 17	Best Actor in a Science Fiction/Fantasy Movie	Nominated	
Detroit Film Critics Society
2017	Good Time	Best Actor	Nominated	
2019	The Lighthouse	Best Actor	Nominated	
Dublin Film Critics Circle
2019	High Life	Best Actor	Nominated	
Film Critics Circle of Australia
2014	The Rover	Best Supporting Actor	Nominated	
Florida Film Critics Circle
2017	Good Time	Best Actor	Nominated	
Houston Film Critics Society
2017	Good Time	Best Actor	Nominated	
Indiana Film Journalists Association
2019	The Lighthouse	Best Actor	Nominated	
IndieWire Critics Poll
2019	The Lighthouse, and High Life	Best Actor	Nominated	
London Film Critics' Circle
2020	The Lighthouse, The King and High Life	British / Irish Actor of the Year	Won	
North Texas Film Critics Association
2017	Good Time	Best Actor	Nominated	
San Diego Film Critics Society
2017	Good Time	Best Actor	Nominated	
Seattle Film Critics Society
2017	Good Time	Best Actor	Nominated	
Vancouver Film Critics Circle Awards
2012	Cosmopolis	Best Actor in a Canadian Film	Nominated	

== Notes ==
^{€} Shared with Lance Oppenheim, Ari Aster, Fred Berger, William Iannaccone, Brian Kavanaugh-Jones, Lars Knudsen and Brighton McCloskey.

^γ Shared with Billy Burke, Justin Chon, Sarah Clarke, Peter Facinelli, Edi Gathegi, Cam Gigandet, Ashley Greene, Anna Kendrick, Taylor Lautner, Rachelle Lefèvre, Kellan Lutz, Jackson Rathbone, Elizabeth Reaser, Nikki Reed, Christian Serratos, Kristen Stewart and Michael Welch.

^$ Shared with Kristen Stewart.

^ρ Shared with Cam Gigandet.

^δ Shared with Bryce Dallas Howard and Xavier Samuel.

^† Shared with Taylor Lautner and Kristen Stewart.

^λ Shared with Cameron Bright, Billy Burke, Sarah Clarke, Bryce Dallas Howard, Peter Facinelli, Dakota Fanning, Jodelle Ferland, Ashley Greene, Anna Kendrick, Taylor Lautner, Kellan Lutz, Jackson Rathbone, Elizabeth Reaser, Nikki Reed, Xavier Samuel, Catalina Sandino Moreno, Kristen Stewart and Michael Welch.

^β Shared with MyAnna Buring, Billy Burke, Christian Camargo, Jamie Campbell Bower, Sarah Clarke, Peter Facinelli, Olga Fonda, Mackenzie Foy, Maggie Grace, Ashley Greene, Christopher Heyerdahl, Julia Jones, Casey LaBow, Taylor Lautner, Kellan Lutz, Mía Maestro, Jackson Rathbone, Elizabeth Reaser, Nikki Reed, Michael Sheen, Chaske Spencer, Booboo Stewart and Kristen Stewart.

^AShared with Zoë Kravitz.
