= Cosmopolis (novel) =

2003 novel by Don DeLillo

- Author: Don DeLillo
- Language: English
- Genre: Novel
- Publisher: Scribner
- Publication date: April 14, 2003
- Publication place: United States
- Media type: Print (hardback & paperback)
- Pages: 209 (hardcover first edition)
- ISBN: 0-7432-4424-9 (hardcover first edition)
- OCLC: 50441437
- Dewey Decimal: 813/.54 21
- LC Class: PS3554.E4425 C67 2003
- Preceded by: The Body Artist
- Followed by: Falling Man

Cosmopolis is a novel by American writer Don DeLillo. His thirteenth novel, it was published by Scribner on April 14, 2003.

== Plot summary ==
Cosmopolis is the story of Eric Packer, a 28-year-old multi-billionaire and asset manager who makes an odyssey across midtown Manhattan to get a haircut. He drives around in a stretch limo, which is richly described as luxurious, spacious and highly technical, filled with television screens and computer monitors, bulletproofed and floored with Carrara marble. It is also cork-lined to eliminate (although unsuccessfully, as Packer notes) the intrusion of street noise.

Packer's voyage is obstructed by various traffic jams caused by a presidential visit to the city, a full-fledged anti-capitalist riot, and a funeral procession for a Sufi rap star. Along the way, the hero has several chance meetings with his wife and sexual encounters with other women. Packer is also stalked by two men, a comical "pastry assassin" and an unstable "credible threat". Through the course of the day, the protagonist loses incredible amounts of money for his clients by betting against the rise of the Yen.

== Reception ==
Reviews for Cosmopolis were generally mixed, especially compared to many of DeLillo's previous novels. Peter Wolfe of the St. Louis Post-Dispatch called the book "eerily brilliant" and that it "confirms Don DeLillo's place among [the best writers] elite." John Updike wrote in The New Yorker that "DeLillo's fervent intelligence and his fastidious, edgy prose... weave halos of import around every event". Walter Kirn criticized the novel in The New York Times, writing "Beware the novel of ideas, particularly when the ideas come first and all the novel stuff (like the story) comes second. Cosmopolis is an intellectual turkey shoot, sending up a succession of fat targets just in time for its author to aim and fire the rounds he loaded before he started writing." Also in The New York Times, Michiko Kakutani described the novel as "a major dud", with a "hokey, contrived storyline".

Several reviewers praised DeLillo's style, including David Kipen of the San Francisco Chronicle who wrote "DeLillo continues to think about the modern world in language and images as quizzically beautiful as any writer now going". Jessica Slater of the Rocky Mountain News also liked the prose but was overall dissatisfied, writing "His style, as always, is unique and insightful, but for all he packs into that one day in April, he fails to show us anything we haven't seen before".

Shortly after Cronenberg's film adaptation in 2011, Cornel Bonca in the Los Angeles Review of Books, and Ben Jeffery in The Point, argued for a more positive re-appraisal of Cosmopolis, highlighting its prescience.

== Film adaptation ==
Canadian director David Cronenberg adapted the novel for the screen in 2011, starring Robert Pattinson as Eric Packer. Cronenberg's film version premiered at the Cannes Film Festival on May 25, 2012, and met with mixed reviews.
