= Gettysburg 1863 =

Upcoming film by Bo Brinkman

- Directed by: Bo Brinkman
- Written by: Bo Brinkman
- Produced by: Bo Brinkham; Andrew Dalton; Kris Webb; Ken Schwenker
- Starring: Stephen Lang; Jake Busey; Bruce Boxleitner; Samuel Roukin; Shannon Lucio; Eric Nelsen; Drew Seltzer
- Cinematography: Eric Zimmerman
- Production company: Cactus Films
- Country: United States
- Language: English

Gettysburg 1863 is an upcoming American war film about the aftermath of the Battle of Gettysburg in the American Civil War.

== Cast ==
- Stephen Lang
- Jake Busey
- Bruce Boxleitner
- Samuel Roukin
- Shannon Lucio
- Eric Nelsen
- Drew Seltzer
- Hannah Galway
- Emma Halleen
- Kayla Anjali
- Alfonso Freeman
- James Romberger

== Production ==
In January 2026, it was confirmed that the film was set to feature Stephen Lang, Jake Busey, Bruce Boxleitner, Samuel Roukin, Shannon Lucio, Eric Nelsen, Drew Seltzer, Hannah Galway, Emma Halleen, Kayla Anjali, and Alfonso Freeman. By October 2025, filming for Gettysburg 1863 had begun, including in Gettysburg, Pennsylvania. In January 2026, further filming took place in Gettysburg.
