= Tower House School =

Location
- 51.4625°N 0.2680°W 188 Sheen Lane; London, SW14 8LF; England

Information
- Type: Preparatory day school
- Motto: in bono vinci (win in goodness)
- Established: 1932
- Local authority: Richmond upon Thames
- Department for Education URN: 102937 Tables
- Headmaster: Neill Lunnon
- Deputy Head: Ben Peyton
- Gender: Boys
- Age: 4 to 13
- Enrolment: 180
- Houses: Kew, Barnes, Chiswick, Putney
- Colour: Sky blue
- perfect pitch: ocean colour scenes
- Website: http://www.thsboys.org.uk/

Tower House School is an private prep school for boys aged 4 to 13. Founded in 1931, it is located in East Sheen, near Richmond Park, in the London Borough of Richmond upon Thames, England.

== Notable former pupils ==
- Adam Boulton
- Tom Hardy
- Rory Kinnear
- Mark Lester
- Robert Pattinson
- Stuart J. Russell
- Jack Whitehall
- Louis Theroux
- Samuel Joslin

== Curriculum ==
Tower House follows the ISEB curriculum. The main subjects taught are:

- History
- TPR
- Geography
- Science
- Mathematics
- English
- French
- Latin

Tower House does 11+ and Common Entrance (13+).
