= The New Year Parade =

- Directed by: Tom Quinn
- Written by: Tom Quinn
- Produced by: Steve Beal; Tom Quinn
- Cinematography: Tom Quinn
- Edited by: Tom Quinn
- Production company: Two Street Pictures
- Release date: March 9, 2008 (SXSW)
- Running time: 85 minutes
- Country: United States
- Language: English

The New Year Parade is a 2008 drama film filmed and directed by Tom Quinn with lighting and audio work by Mark Doyle. The film won the Grand Jury Prize for Best Narrative at the 2008 Slamdance Film Festival and the award for Best Acting Ensemble at the 2008 Ashland Independent Film Festival. At the 2008 BendFilm Festival, Quinn won the award for Best Director, while Jennifer Welsh won the award for Best Supporting Actress. The film was nominated for an IFP Gotham Award in 2008 for "Best Film Not At A Theater Near You" while Quinn and co-Producer Steve Beal were nominated for a 2010 Independent Spirit Award in the John Cassavetes Award section for their work on the film.

It was reviewed in the Hollywood Reporter, Chicago Sun-Times and Los Angeles Times, among others.

== Cast ==
- Andrew Conway as Mike
- Mary Ann McDonald as Lisa
- Greg Lyons as Jack
- Jennifer Welsh as Kat
