= Robert Pattinson =

English actor (born 1986)

- Pattinson in 2026
- Born: Robert Douglas Thomas Pattinson; 13 May 1986 (age 40); Barnes, London, England
- Occupations: Actor; producer
- Years active: 2004–present
- Organisation: Icki Eneo Arlo
- Works: Full list
- Partner(s): Suki Waterhouse (2018–present; engaged)
- Children: 1
- Relatives: Lizzy Pattinson (sister)
- Awards: Full list

Robert Douglas Thomas Pattinson (born 13 May 1986) is an English actor and producer. Pattinson is known for his performances in both major studio productions and independent films, often portraying eccentric characters. His accolades include nominations for an AACTA Award, a Canadian Screen Award and two Independent Spirit Awards. Included on yearly lists of the world's highest-paid actors, he was ranked by Time as one of the 100 most influential people in the world and featured in the Forbes Celebrity 100 in 2010.

Born and raised in London, Pattinson started acting at the age of 13 in a London theatre club. He first gained recognition for portraying Cedric Diggory in the fantasy film Harry Potter and the Goblet of Fire (2005), before achieving global stardom as Edward Cullen in The Twilight Saga film series. Released yearly between 2008 and 2012, its five films collectively grossed over $3.3 billion worldwide. Pattinson also led the romantic dramas Remember Me (2010) and Water for Elephants (2011).

Pattinson subsequently began collaborating with auteur directors in independent cinema. He received praise for his performances in films across a variety of genres, such as Cosmopolis (2012), The Rover (2014), The Lost City of Z (2016), Good Time (2017), High Life (2018), The Lighthouse (2019), and Primetime (2026). In the 2020s, Pattinson returned to big-budget mainstream cinema with starring roles in Christopher Nolan's Tenet (2020) and The Odyssey (2026), Matt Reeves's The Batman (2022), and Bong Joon Ho's Mickey 17 (2025). In 2026, Pattinson was cast as James Bond in Denis Villeneuve's upcoming 26th James Bond film.

Pattinson is the founder of the production company Icki Eneo Arlo, foraying into both film and stage productions. He has contributed vocals to several film soundtracks, and is involved in philanthropy, supporting organisations such as the GO Campaign. Pattinson began modelling as a child and has served as the face of Dior Homme fragrance since 2013. Labelled as a sex symbol by the media, he is frequently named one of the most attractive actors. Since 2018, he has been in a relationship with actress and singer Suki Waterhouse, with whom he has a child.

== Early life ==
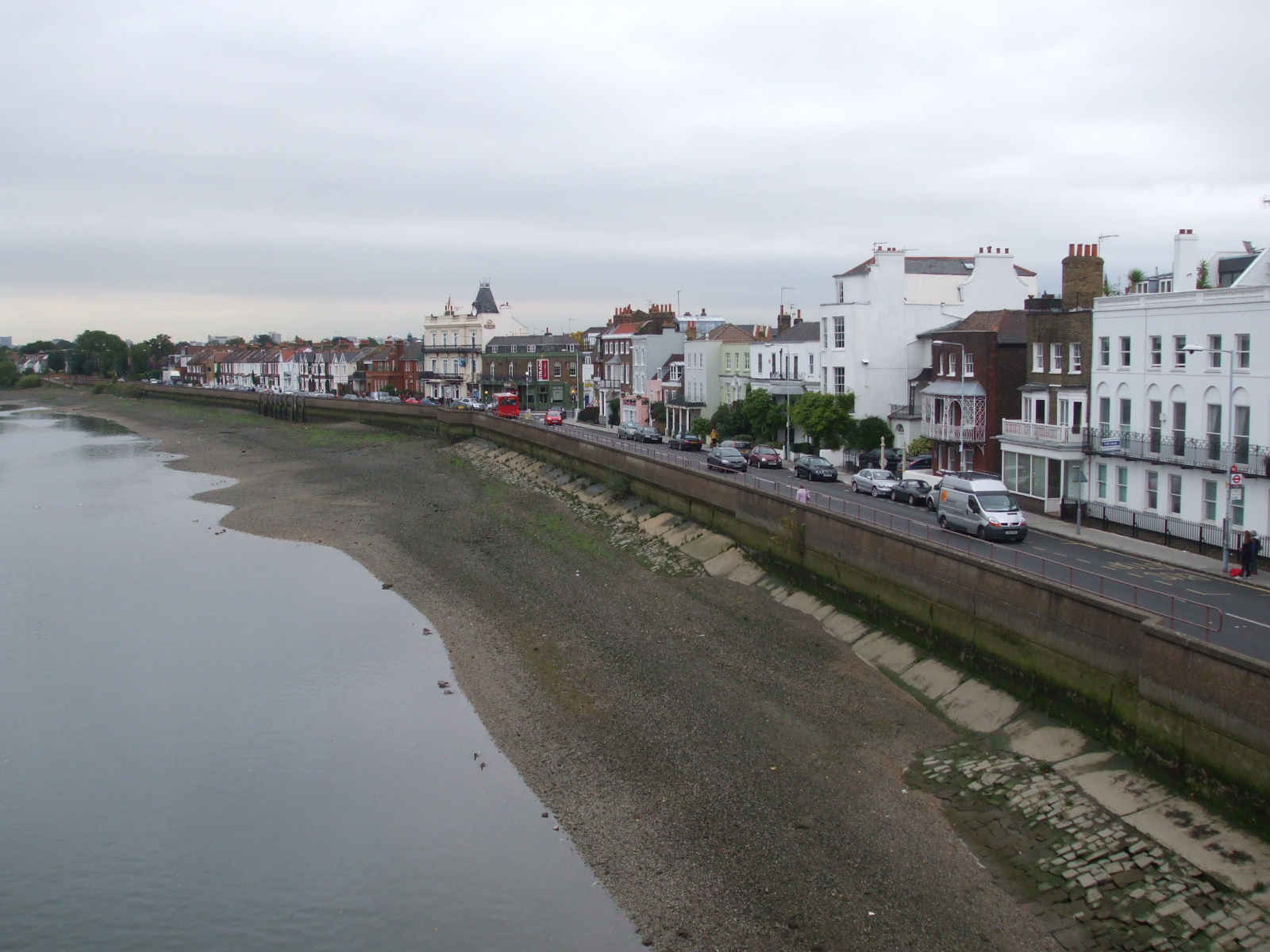
Barnes, where Pattinson was born and raised

Robert Douglas Thomas Pattinson was born on 13 May 1986 in the Barnes district of London, England. His father, Richard, owned a business importing vehicles from the United States, while his mother, Clare, worked at a modelling agency. Pattinson has two older sisters, Victoria and Elizabeth. At the age of four, he began attending Tower House Boys' Preparatory School and developed an interest in playing the piano and guitar. By the age of six, Pattinson was participating in amateur performances. He secured his first role in a play titled Spell for a Rhyme, written by one of his teachers, and later appeared in his school's adaptation of William Golding's novel Lord of the Flies (1954).

As a child, Pattinson was disorganised and resistant to completing homework, and he exhibited a lackadaisical attitude. His sisters often dressed him up as a girl, creating a female persona they named Claudia. In his leisure time, he enjoyed playing football, video games, and watching television shows such as Sharky and George, Doctor Who and Hammerman. Later, his parents enrolled him at the Harrodian School, on Lonsdale Road near the family home. Pattinson excelled in English studies, which he described as his favourite subject. As a teenager, he worked as a model for British fashion brands and magazines. In his late teens, he pursued music by performing acoustic guitar sets at open mic nights in pubs around London. He sang original compositions either solo under the stage name Bobby Dupea or with his band, Bad Girls.

Pattinson initially considered a career in music or studying speechwriting at university but never thought about pursuing acting. A teacher once advised him against joining the school drama club, believing he was not suited for the creative arts. At the age of thirteen, Pattinson joined the Barnes Theatre Company, a local amateur theatre group, after his father encouraged him to join to help him overcome his shyness. After working backstage, he auditioned for the play Guys and Dolls and secured his first role as a Cuban dancer with no lines. In the following production, Our Town, he played the lead role of George Gibbs. During this performance, a talent agent in the audience noticed him, leading Pattinson to begin pursuing professional acting opportunities. He went on to appear in stage productions such as Macbeth, Anything Goes and Tess of the d'Urbervilles. Pattinson initially intended to go to university, but filming for Harry Potter and the Goblet of Fire conflicted with his schedule. Around this time, he shared a flat in Soho with his childhood friend and fellow actor Tom Sturridge.

== Career ==
=== 2004–2007: Beginnings ===
Pattinson's first film role was in Mira Nair's 2004 costume drama film Vanity Fair—an adaptation of a novel by William Makepeace Thackeray—in which he portrayed the son of Becky Sharp. However, his scenes were deleted from the final cut and are only available in the DVD version of the film. Reflecting on the experience, Pattinson stated, "My first job I was playing Reese Witherspoon's son and I hadn't done any acting in school. I wasn't in a drama school or anything. I'd done one amateur play and you end up doing a film with Reese Witherspoon". That year, Pattinson had a more prominent role in the television film Dark Kingdom: The Dragon King alongside Max von Sydow and Julian Sands. Directed by Uli Edel, the film follows Siegfried (played by Benno Furmann), a young blacksmith who slays a dragon and falls in love with Queen Brunhild (played by Kristanna Loken). Pattinson portrays Giselher, the younger brother of King Gunther and Princess Kriemhild, who looks up to Siegfried as a demigod.

In 2005, Pattinson was cast as Cedric Diggory in the fantasy film Harry Potter and the Goblet of Fire, directed by Mike Newell. According to Newell, "Cedric exemplifie[d] all that you would expect the Hogwarts champion to be. Robert [...] was born to play the role; he's quintessentially English with chiselled public schoolboy good looks". Pattinson learned to scuba dive in preparation for the role. For his performance, he was named the 2005 "British Star of Tomorrow" by The Times and was also referred to as "the next Jude Law". The film grossed nearly $897 million worldwide, making it the highest-grossing film of 2005.

In 2006, Pattinson starred in Chris Durlacher's The Haunted Airman, a psychological thriller that aired on BBC Four on 31 October. He played a World War II pilot who is shot, left paralysed and suffers from severe shell shock, eventually descending into madness. Pattinson himself described the role as his "best acting experience". His performance received positive reviews, with The Stage saying that he portrayed "the airman of the title with a perfect combination of youthful terror and world-weary cynicism". Pattinson then appeared in a supporting role as Daniel in the 2007 film The Bad Mother's Handbook, a one-off television drama adapted from a novel by Kate Long. In the film, he portrayed a shy young man who develops feelings for a girl struggling with issues after being dumped by her former boyfriend and experiencing difficulties with her mother.

=== 2008–2013: The Twilight Saga and growing fame ===
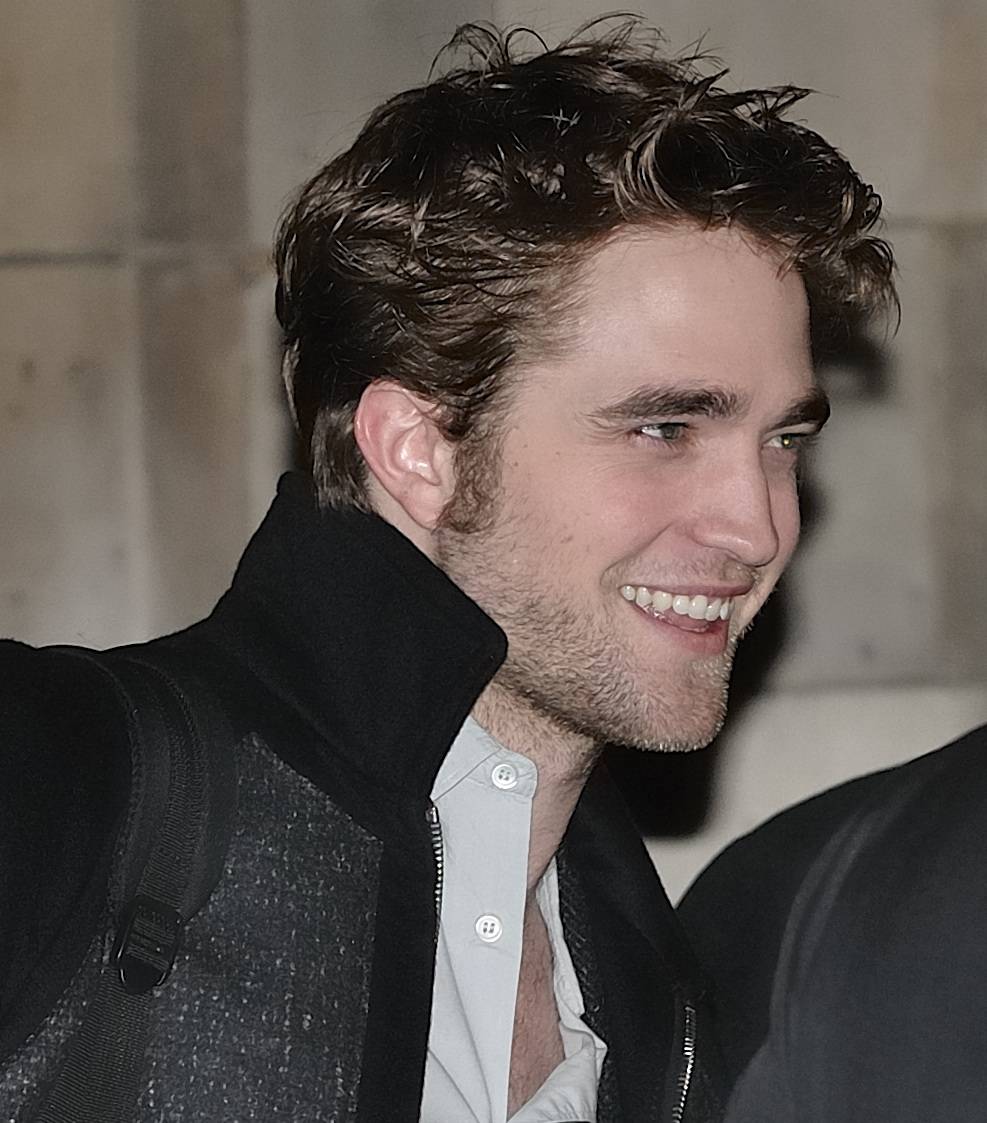
Pattinson at a photocall for The Twilight Saga: New Moon in 2009

In 2008, Pattinson played his first leading role as Art in the film How to Be, directed by Oliver Irving. In the film, Art, after being dumped by his girlfriend, moves back in with his parents and convinces a Canadian self-help guru to relocate to London to help him rebuild his life. Irving recalled Pattinson's audition, saying, "Robert walked in[,] forgot his lines and just started improvising, which was exactly what I wanted [...] he's a really down-to-earth guy". Pattinson himself enjoyed filming the movie, stating that he "loved the script" and found it "very different from everything else [he] had read". That same year, Pattinson portrayed Salvador Dalí in Little Ashes (2008). He was originally considered for the role of Federico García Lorca, Dalí's lover, but the part ultimately went to Javier Beltrán. The film mostly received negative reviews; the Toronto Star's Greg Quill stated that "even cinematographer Adam Suschitzky's richly textured and resonantly toned cityscapes and rural scenes can't make up for a flawed script and weak performances in what might have been a powerful historical drama".

In 2008, Pattinson starred alongside Kristen Stewart as Edward Cullen in the romantic fantasy Twilight, based on Stephenie Meyer's 2005 novel of the same name. Approximately three thousand men submitted resumes for the role of Cullen, many of whom auditioned. Director Catherine Hardwicke said that Pattinson had "everything [they] needed [...] that angular face and kind of mysterious Edward aura". According to Pattinson, his performance in the film was largely influenced by Stewart's. He adopted an American accent for the role and wore contact lenses. In the film, Bella, portrayed by Stewart, faces danger from James, a vampire determined to kill her and drink her blood, leading Cullen—Bella's vampire lover—to become embroiled in a battle with James. While the film received mixed reviews, critics widely praised Pattinson's chemistry with Stewart. The New York Times's Manohla Dargis described Pattinson as a "capable and exotically beautiful" actor, while Roger Ebert believed he was "well-chosen" for the role.

Pattinson presented at the 81st Academy Awards in February 2009; he was initially set to appear with Stewart, who declined. He played Richard in Daisy Gili's film The Summer House (2009). The story follows Richard, Jane's (played by Talulah Riley) ex-boyfriend, as he travels to France to try to win back her love after cheating on her. The short film was later re-released as part of an anthology titled Love & Distrust (2010), which features five short films exploring the lives of eight individuals from different backgrounds on their journey to find contentment. Revolver Entertainment released Robsessed (2009), a documentary about Pattinson's life and rise to fame. Pattinson reprised his role as Cullen in the Twilight sequel, The Twilight Saga: New Moon, which was released in November 2009. The film grossed a record-breaking $142.8 million in its opening weekend and earned a total of $711 million worldwide, making it the seventh-highest-grossing film of 2009. Bill Goodykoontz of The Arizona Republic mentioned that "Pattinson's actually not in the film that much, but he does his best when he's around", while The Washington Post's Michael O'Sullivan praised his acting as "uniformly strong". The film earned Pattinson three MTV Movie Awards at the 2010 ceremony.

In 2010, Pattinson executive-produced and starred in the coming-of-age drama film Remember Me, portraying Tyler Hawkins. Directed by Allen Coulter, the film follows a young couple navigating their relationship in the aftermath of a family tragedy. Pattinson's role in the film received mixed reviews from critics. That same year, he reprised his role as Edward Cullen in The Twilight Saga: Eclipse (2010)—which emerged as the sixth-highest-grossing film of that year, making over $698.4 million. In 2011, Pattinson portrayed Jacob Jankowski in Water for Elephants, a film adaptation of Sara Gruen's 2006 novel, in which he reunited with Witherspoon. While the film received mixed reviews, Pattinson's performance garnered praise; Time's Richard Corliss described it as "star quality". Pattinson reprised his role as Edward Cullen in The Twilight Saga: Breaking Dawn – Part 1 (2011). The film grossed $712 million worldwide, which made it the fourth-highest-grossing film of 2011, but received mixed to negative reviews from critics. Pattinson starred as Georges Duroy in a 2012 film adaptation of the 1885 novel Bel-Ami.

Pattinson starred in the film adaptation of the novel Cosmopolis, directed by David Cronenberg. The film competed for the Palme d'Or at the 2012 Cannes Film Festival and received generally positive reviews, with Pattinson's performance earning particular acclaim. Robbie Collin of The Daily Telegraph hailed it as a "sensational performance", stating that Pattinson portrays the character Eric Packer "like a human caldera; stony on the surface, with volcanic chambers of nervous energy and self-loathing churning deep below". Entertainment Weekly's Owen Gleiberman said that Pattinson, "pale and predatory even without his pasty-white vampire makeup", delivered his lines with "frigid pensées" and "rhythmic confidence". Pattinson reprised his role as Edward Cullen for the final time in The Twilight Saga: Breaking Dawn – Part 2 (2012). The film became the highest-grossing instalment of the Twilight series and the sixth-highest-grossing film of 2012, earning over $829 million worldwide.

=== 2014–2019: Independent films ===
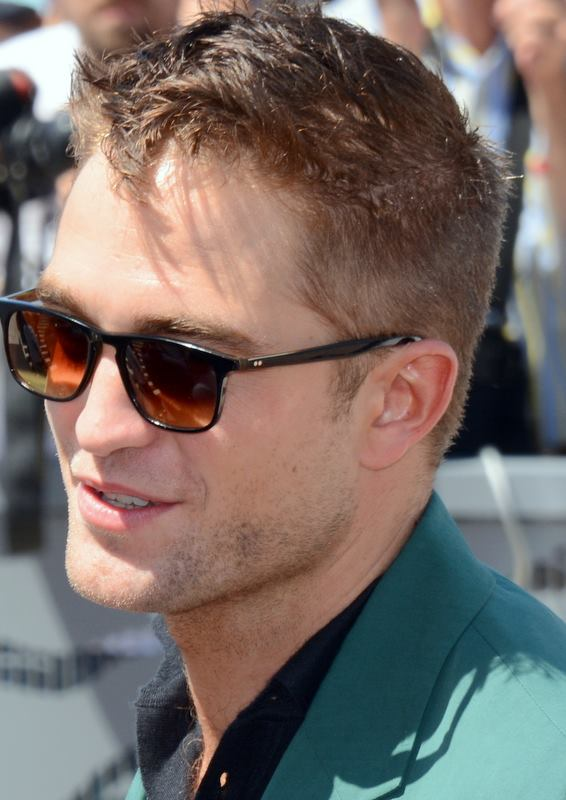
Pattinson at the 2014 Cannes Film Festival

In May 2014, two of Pattinson's films debuted at the 2014 Cannes Film Festival. Pattinson starred in David Michôd's futuristic western The Rover, alongside Guy Pearce and Scoot McNairy. He travelled to Australia to portray the role of Reynolds, spending seven weeks filming. The film is set in the Outback a decade after an economic collapse; Pattinson's character is a young, naive American man who is abandoned by his brother following a failed robbery. Variety's Scott Foundas praised Pattinson's "career re-defining performance", as well as his convincing Southern accent and "understated dignity" in a role that could have been overly sentimental. Next, Pattinson reunited with Cronenberg for the satirical drama Maps to the Stars. He portrayed Jerome Fontana, a struggling limousine driver and actor who aspires to be a screenwriter. Cronenberg thought casting Pattinson was an "easy decision to make", praising him as "extremely inventive". Robbie Collin described Pattinson's performance as "winningly played".

He starred in Werner Herzog's biographical film Queen of the Desert (2015), an adaptation of Gertrude Bell's life story, starring alongside Nicole Kidman and James Franco. Pattinson portrayed T. E. Lawrence, also known as Lawrence of Arabia. Geoffrey Macnab of The Independent described his performance as "comic and a very long way removed from Peter O'Toole", stating that Pattinson played Lawrence as "a sharp-tongued, sardonic figure who can see through the pretensions of his bosses and colleagues". David Rooney of The Hollywood Reporter called Pattinson's role "brief but significant" and highlighted the "easy camaraderie in his scenes with Kidman". He next starred in Anton Corbijn's biographical drama Life (2015), based on the life of actor James Dean. Set in the 1950s, Pattinson played Dennis Stock, a photographer who became friends with Dean after travelling with him through Los Angeles, Indiana and New York. Guy Lodge of Variety called his performance a "sly turn", while David Rooney, writing for The Hollywood Reporter, thought that Pattinson "[gave] arguably the most fully rounded performance".

In late 2015, Pattinson starred in The Childhood of a Leader, the directorial debut of Brady Corbet, alongside Bérénice Bejo and Stacy Martin. Pattinson took on dual roles in the film, first as Charles Marker, a reporter in Germany during World War I, and later as the adult version of the leader. Peter Bradshaw of The Guardian described his performance as "elegant" and Screen International's Lee Marshall praising the role as "excellent". In 2016, Pattinson appeared in Plan B Entertainment's The Lost City of Z, directed by James Gray. Pattinson had been cast as British explorer Corporal Henry Costin in November 2013. Set in the 1920s, the film follows British surveyor Percy Fawcett, who disappears in the Amazon rainforest while searching for a mythical city. For the role, Pattinson grew a thick beard and lost nearly 35 pounds (16 kg). Though the film was a box-office bomb, Us Weekly writer Mara Reinstein thought that Pattinson's performance in the film was "compelling", while The Guardian thought that Pattinson was "considerably more interesting to watch", commenting that the viewer may find themselves "wishing that his character, rather than the dashing but dull Fawcett, was the focus of the film".

Pattinson next starred in the Safdie brothers' neo-exploitation thriller Good Time (2017) as Connie Nikas, a bank robber navigating the criminal underworld of Queens, New York. His performance was described as a "career peak" by Variety's Guy Lodge and his "career-best" by Eric Kohn from IndieWire. David Rooney of The Hollywood Reporter compared Pattinson's portrayal to Al Pacino's performance as Sonny Wortzik in Dog Day Afternoon (1975), ultimately describing it as "his most commanding performance to date". For his role, Pattinson earned his first Independent Spirit Award nomination for Best Male Lead. While promoting Good Time, Pattinson wrote and starred in a short film for GQ titled Fear & Shame. Filmed on the streets of New York, the piece follows Pattinson, playing himself, as he navigates the city's bustling environment, attempting to buy a hot dog while evading the media and fans.

The Zellner Brothers' western-comedy Damsel (2018) marked Pattinson's return to comedy for the first time since How to Be. He portrayed Samuel Alabaster, an eccentric cowboy embarking on a journey west in search of his kidnapped fiancée. His performance received positive reviews, with Dana Schwartz from Entertainment Weekly describing it as "so delightfully unhinged that it harkens back Jake Gyllenhaal in Okja". Pattinson's second and final film of 2018 was Claire Denis's sci-fi drama High Life, set in space and centred on a group of criminals sent on a mission toward a black hole. Denis initially considered Philip Seymour Hoffman for the lead role, but after recognising Pattinson's dedication and enthusiasm to collaborate, she cast him instead. Pattinson played Monte, a reluctant father who raises his daughter alone as their spaceship continues its journey into deep space. Screen International's Allen Hunter praised Pattinson as the most "dominant" and "engaging" presence in the film, while Jason Bailey of The Playlist described it as "another scorching Pattinson performance", praising his compelling portrayal of the character's menace and defiance.

Pattinson's first role in 2019 was in Robert Eggers's black-and-white psychological horror film The Lighthouse, set on a remote New England island in the 1890s. The film premiered in the Directors' Fortnight section at the 2019 Cannes Film Festival, earning good reviews for both its storytelling and Pattinson's performance. In his review for The Guardian, Bradshaw described Pattinson's performance as "mesmeric" and a "sledgehammer punch" that "just gets better and better". He earned his second nomination for the Independent Spirit Award for Best Male Lead. Pattinson's next two films premiered at the 2019 Venice Film Festival. He first starred in The King—his second collaboration with Michôd, and an adaptation of William Shakespeare's plays. Pattinson portrayed Louis, The Dauphin, the nemesis of Henry V. For the role, he adopted a French accent, which he modelled after individuals in the French fashion industry. While opinions on his accent were mixed, critics largely praised his performance, describing it as "scene-stealing" and a standout in the film. He then appeared in Ciro Guerra's Waiting for the Barbarians (2019), an adaptation of J. M. Coetzee's 1980 novel, alongside Mark Rylance and Johnny Depp. Boyd van Hoeij of The Hollywood Reporter considered it "a rather flat supporting role", and The Guardian critic Harry Windsor described it as "stiff" and "over-articulated".

=== 2020–present: Mainstream recognition: Batman and James Bond ===
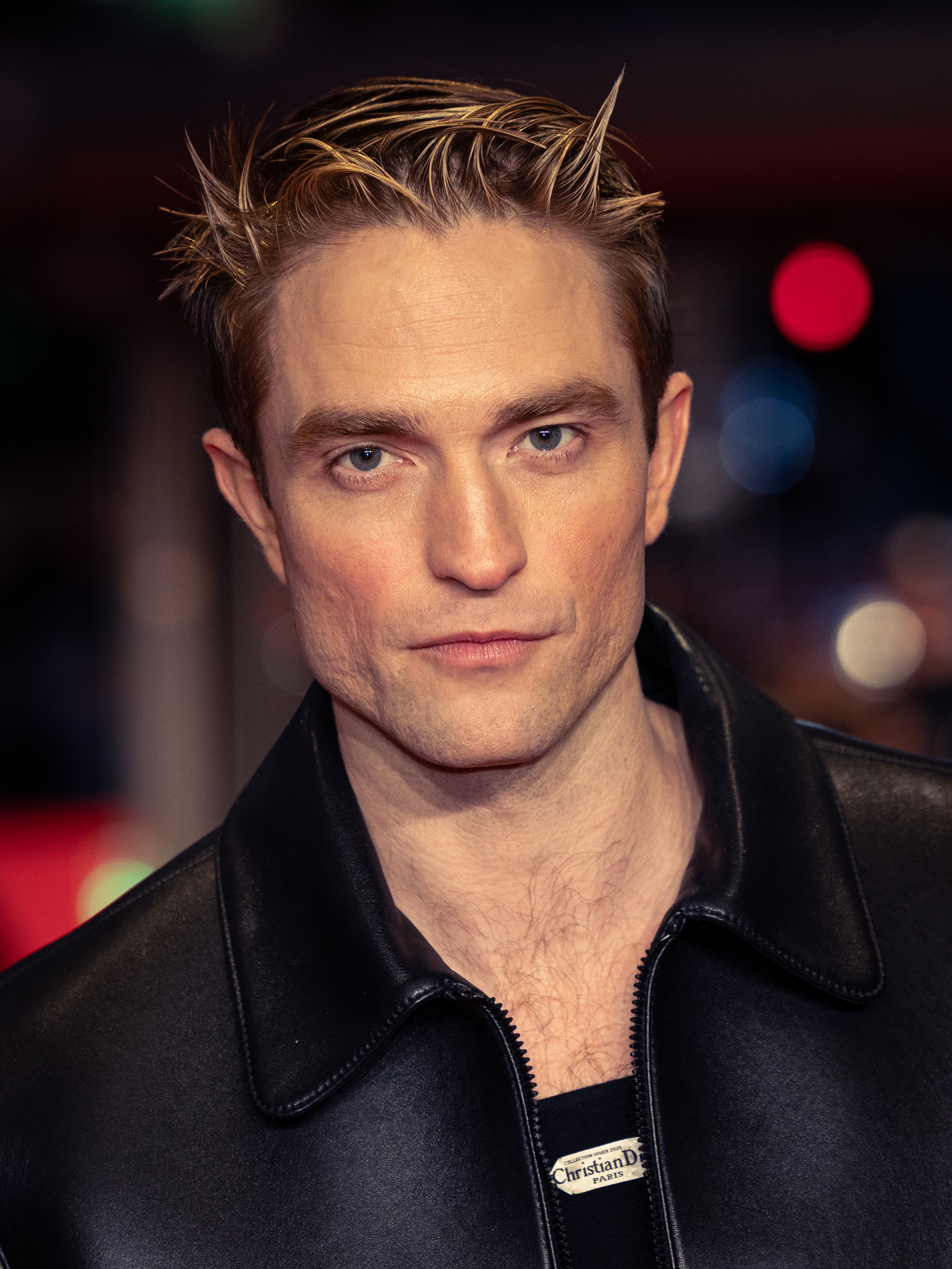
Pattinson at the 75th Berlin International Film Festival in 2025

Pattinson starred as Neil, a spy handler, in Christopher Nolan's Tenet (2020), alongside John David Washington, marking his return to big-budget films. He based his character's mannerisms on those of author Christopher Hitchens. Jessica Kiang of The New York Times labelled him as "delightful" and praised his chemistry with Washington. Pattinson next featured as part of an ensemble cast in The Devil All the Time (2020), a psychological thriller based on the novel by Donald Ray Pollock. The film is set in the 1950s, and Pattinson played a lewd small-town preacher named Preston Teagardin. Austin Collin, writing for Rolling Stone, found him "eely, eerie, [and] intriguing", while Owen Gleiberman of Variety praised him for doing "a stylish job". In May 2021, Pattinson signed a first-look deal with Warner Bros and HBO for producing and developing projects.

Pattinson portrayed Batman and his secret alter ego Bruce Wayne in Matt Reeves's 2022 superhero film The Batman. Following Ben Affleck's departure from the role, Reeves wrote the character with Pattinson in mind after being impressed by his performance in Good Time. The film was a critical and commercial success, though Pattinson's casting initially faced backlash from some Batman fans. However, his portrayal was ultimately praised by critics upon the film's release, with Davis Rooney of The Hollywood Reporter finding him "riveting throughout". In 2023, Pattinson lent his voice to the titular grey heron in the English-language dub of Hayao Miyazaki's Japanese animated film The Boy and the Heron. Under his production company Icki Eneo Arlo, Pattinson produced Sebastián Silva's critically successful film Rotting in the Sun (2023).

In 2025, Pattinson starred in Bong Joon-ho's science fiction film Mickey 17, an adaptation of the novel Mickey7 (2022). He portrayed Mickey Barnes, a disposable crew member on a space mission who is assigned perilous tasks, as he can be regenerated upon death while retaining most of his memories. The film received mostly positive reviews, with most of the focus on Pattinson's performance as dual versions of the same character. In his review for Indiewire, David Ehrlich described it as "two of the best performances of his life here". Pattinson starred alongside Jennifer Lawrence in the thriller Die My Love (2025), portraying her husband. Vogue's Radhika Seth thought that both he and Lawrence were "wholly committed", but were "let down by a [poor] script", while Gleiberman said that in a "rare bad performance, [Pattinson] plays [Jackson] as an unpleasant clueless bro".

The first of Pattinson's multiple 2026 releases was alongside Zendaya, in Kristoffer Borgli's romantic black comedy-drama film The Drama; it garnered both positive reviews and box office success. Critics compared his performance to Hugh Grant's romantic comedies; Pete Hammond of Deadline called it the best acting of his career. He then reunited with Nolan for the critically acclaimed epic film The Odyssey as the suitor Antinous. Pattinson, whose performance was praised by David Ehelich of IndieWire for being "sniveling and magnificent", modeled his character after James Woods in the Martin Scorsese-directed gangster film Casino (1995). Pattinson's next project was Lance Oppenheim's feature film debut Primetime, working as a producer and starring actor as television presenter and journalist Chris Hansen. Pattinson's performance in the film received widespread critical acclaim: Nicholas Barber of BBC called it "extraordinary" and "the best performance yet from the most intriguing actor of his generation", while David Rooney of The Hollywood Reporter called the performance "riveting". Pattinson also produced Max Wolf Friedlich's off-Broadway dark comedy play The Holes, which ran from September to October 2026.

Pattinson's final 2026 release will be Denis Villeneuve's space opera Dune: Part Three, playing the antagonist Scytale. Pattinson also has multiple producing ventures in development. They include the Parker Finn-helmed Possession, the remake of Andrzej Żuławski's 1981 film; India Donaldson's crime drama ensemble film The Chaperones, and a documentary about an American men's national team in blind football. He will star in Fernando Meirelles's heist film The Take (2027) and reprise his role as Batman in The Batman: Part II (2028). In November 2026, Pattinson was announced by Amazon MGM Studios as the seventh actor to portray the fictional British agent James Bond, beginning with the upcoming 26th film in the series which will be directed by Villeneuve. Pattinson will succeed Daniel Craig, whose final appearance as Bond was in No Time to Die (2021).

== Other ventures ==
=== Modelling and endorsements ===
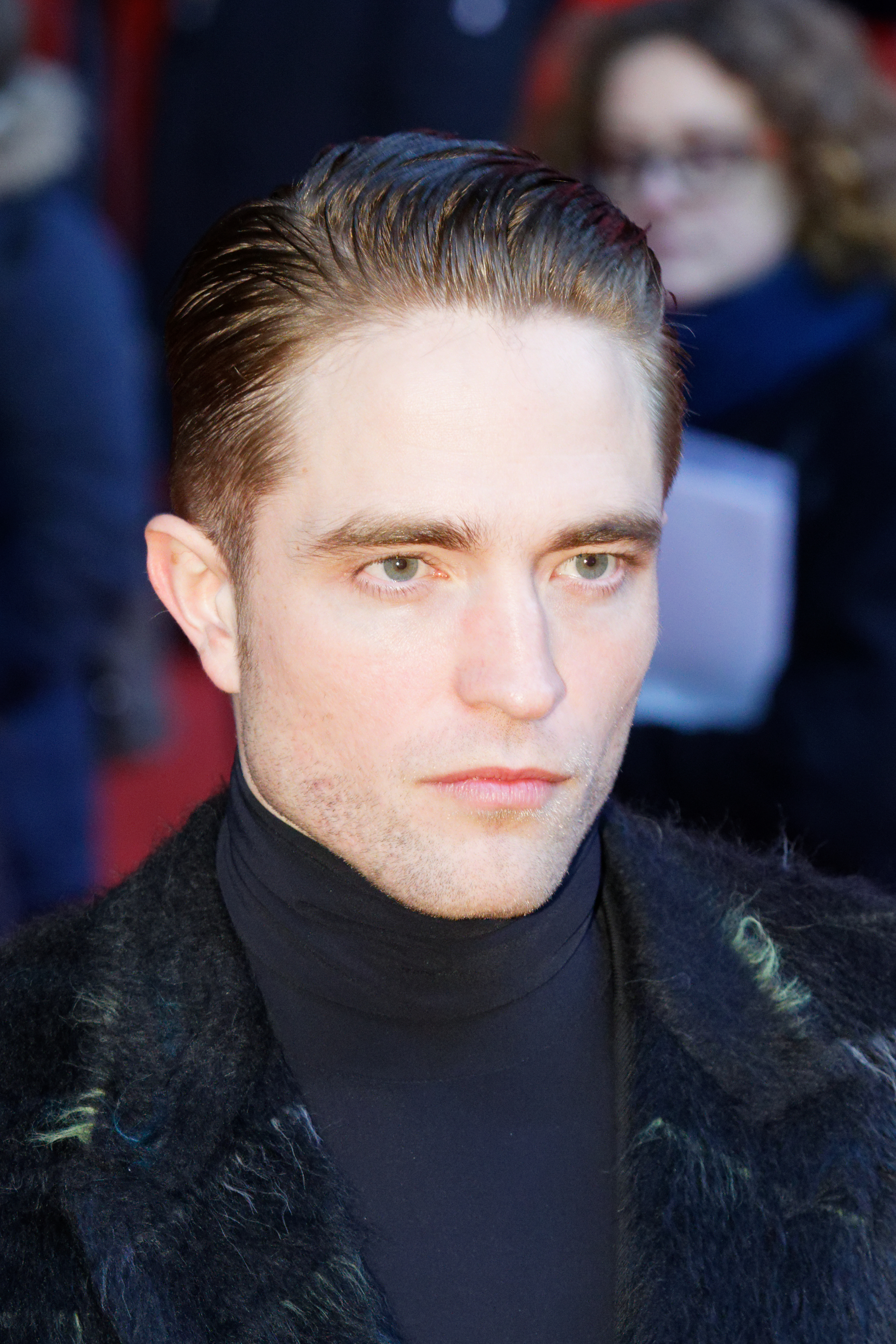
Pattinson in Dior Homme at the 2017 Berlin International Film Festival

Pattinson began modelling at age twelve and continued for about four years. In a December 2008 interview with Closer, he blamed the lack of modelling work on his masculine appearance: "When I first started I was quite tall and looked like a girl, so I got lots of jobs, because it was during that period where the androgynous look was cool. Then, I guess, I became too much of a guy, so I never got any more jobs. I had the most unsuccessful modelling career". Pattinson modelled for various British teen magazines as well as the Hackett clothing line and designer Nicole Farhi. In November 2010, Pattinson was offered a £1 million deal to become the face of Burberry but declined the offer.

In June 2013, Pattinson was announced as the new face of Dior Homme fragrance. That September, he appeared in a black-and-white short film alongside French-American model Camille Rowe. Since then, he has featured in multiple television and print advertising campaigns for the fragrance, collaborating with directors Romain Gavras and the Blaze, as well as photographers Peter Lindbergh, Nan Goldin and Mikael Jansson. Goldin also published the book Robert Pattinson: 1000 Lives, a collection of images from the 2013 campaign. In February 2016, Pattinson became the first ambassador for Dior Homme menswear and appeared in several of the brand's print campaigns, photographed by Karl Lagerfeld and Lindbergh. Reflecting on his nearly decade-long collaboration with Dior in 2020, Pattinson remarked that "there's a timelessness to Dior; it feels like it's going to be around forever, it's a sort of monument".

In October 2025, he was announced as the global ambassador for premium French beer brand 1664, reuniting with Brady Corbet for the campaign of the brand. The campaign was launched in April 2026, titled "Unquestionably Good Taste", featuring Pattinson as different characters in French apartments terrace complex, each character sure of its aesthetic superiority until they unify in their mutual good taste of 1664. The campaign received positive response on its release. In September 2026, Swiss luxury watch brand Jaeger-LeCoultre welcomed Pattinson on board as their global brand ambassador. In November 2026, Pattinson narrated a short animated film directed by Sylvain Chomet for Dior to celebrate and promote their 2026 winter holiday collection.

=== Music ===
Pattinson has been playing the guitar and piano since the age of four and often writes his own music. He lent his vocals to two songs on the Twilight soundtrack: "Never Think", which he co-wrote with Sam Bradley, and "Let Me Sign", written by Marcus Foster and Bobby Long. Director Catherine Hardwicke had included his recordings in an early cut of the film without his knowledge, but Pattinson later agreed that "one of them specifically [...] really made the scene better". He also performed three original songs, composed by Joe Hastings, for the How to Be soundtrack. Despite his musical talent, Pattinson has said, "I've never really recorded anything [...] I just played in pubs and stuff," and when asked about pursuing a professional music career, he remarked that "music is my back-up plan if acting fails". In 2010, he was recognised as Hollywood's Most Influential Top Unexpected Musician by the National Association of Music Merchants.

In 2013, Pattinson played guitar on "Birds", a track from Death Grips' album Government Plates. Drummer Zach Hill recorded Pattinson's playing on his phone during a jam session and later sampled it into the final song. In a March 2017 interview, Pattinson revealed that he would contribute music to his upcoming film Damsel (2018). In February 2019, he collaborated with the Nottingham band Tindersticks, releasing the song "Willow" for the High Life original soundtrack. In October 2020, Pattinson made a cameo appearance during Haim's performance of "3 a.m." on Late Night with Seth Meyers. He delivered the song's opening spoken-word section via a FaceTime video call, reciting the dialogue from the track's phone call intro.

== Philanthropy ==
Pattinson actively supports ECPAT UK's Stop Sex Trafficking of Children and Young People campaign. At the 2009 Cannes Film Festival amfAR event, he helped raise $56,000 for the cause. Pattinson participated in the Hope for Haiti Now: A Global Benefit for Earthquake Relief charity telethon in January 2010. For the GO Campaign, he raised $80,000 by auctioning a Breaking Dawn set visit and later, a private screening of The Twilight Saga: Breaking Dawn – Part 1 (2011).

In August 2011, Pattinson used his Teen Choice Awards acceptance speech to raise awareness for cancer, highlighting the Cancer Bites campaign, which supports those affected by the disease. In August 2013, he visited Children's Hospital Los Angeles, spending time with young patients and participating in arts and crafts activities. The following month, he partnered with International Medical Corps as one of their first responders, helping to raise awareness about disaster preparedness and community resilience. Pattinson has also contributed to several charitable auctions. In November 2013, he attended the Go Go Gala, organised by the GO Campaign, where he purchased a cello made from recycled materials for $5,600. In May 2014, he donated his bike to an auction supporting the Royal Flying Doctor Service, which provides healthcare to individuals in the Outback. In 2014, he took part in the ALS Ice Bucket Challenge to raise awareness for amyotrophic lateral sclerosis (ALS) and participated in the GO Campaign's annual charity event. In October 2015, he joined the Global Goals Campaign, which aims to eradicate poverty by 2030.

In 2015, Pattinson became the first ambassador for the GO Campaign. In May 2019, during the Cannes Film Festival, Pattinson co-hosted a charity event with Helen Mirren, organised by the Hollywood Foreign Press Association (HFPA). Together, they donated $500,000 to the international aid organisation Help Refugees on behalf of the HFPA. During the first COVID-19 lockdown in early 2020, Pattinson donated to GO Campaign's emergency fund, which provided food and hygiene products to vulnerable families in London and Los Angeles. Later that year, while filming The Batman in Liverpool, he surprised a ten-year-old autistic fan who had been waiting on set to meet him. However, an in-person meeting was not feasible, so Pattinson sent a package of DC Batman gifts instead.

== Artistry and acting style ==
If I'm doing a scene and I see that the other actor is expecting me to do it the way I'm doing it, if I can just see that it hasn't surprised them, I immediately feel stupid.

— Pattinson on his acting style

Pattinson is known for taking on roles across a wide range of genres—primarily indie and action films. In 2025, Rolling Stone's David Fear called Pattinson the 21st century's "great movie weirdo" and one of the "most interesting A-list actors". The Daily Telegraph writer Alexander Larman called him a "consistently excellent [actor] in every role [...] who embraced the wider and more exciting opportunities that a career as a character actor offered him". Wendy Ide, writing for The Guardian, found that after taking on roles in auteur films, Pattinson developed a unique, eccentric screen presence that set him apart from his more "groomed and polished" contemporaries. In an interview with GQ, director Matt Reeves—who worked with Pattinson on The Batman (2022)—likened the actor to a chameleon, stating that he "never plays a character with exactly his voice [...] the voice is one of his ways in". Jordan Woods of Screen Rant noted that Pattinson became somewhat typecast after The Twilight Saga (2008–2012) but proved his "real acting chops" in The Batman. In November 2026, Variety ranked Pattinson as the eighty-third best film star of all time.

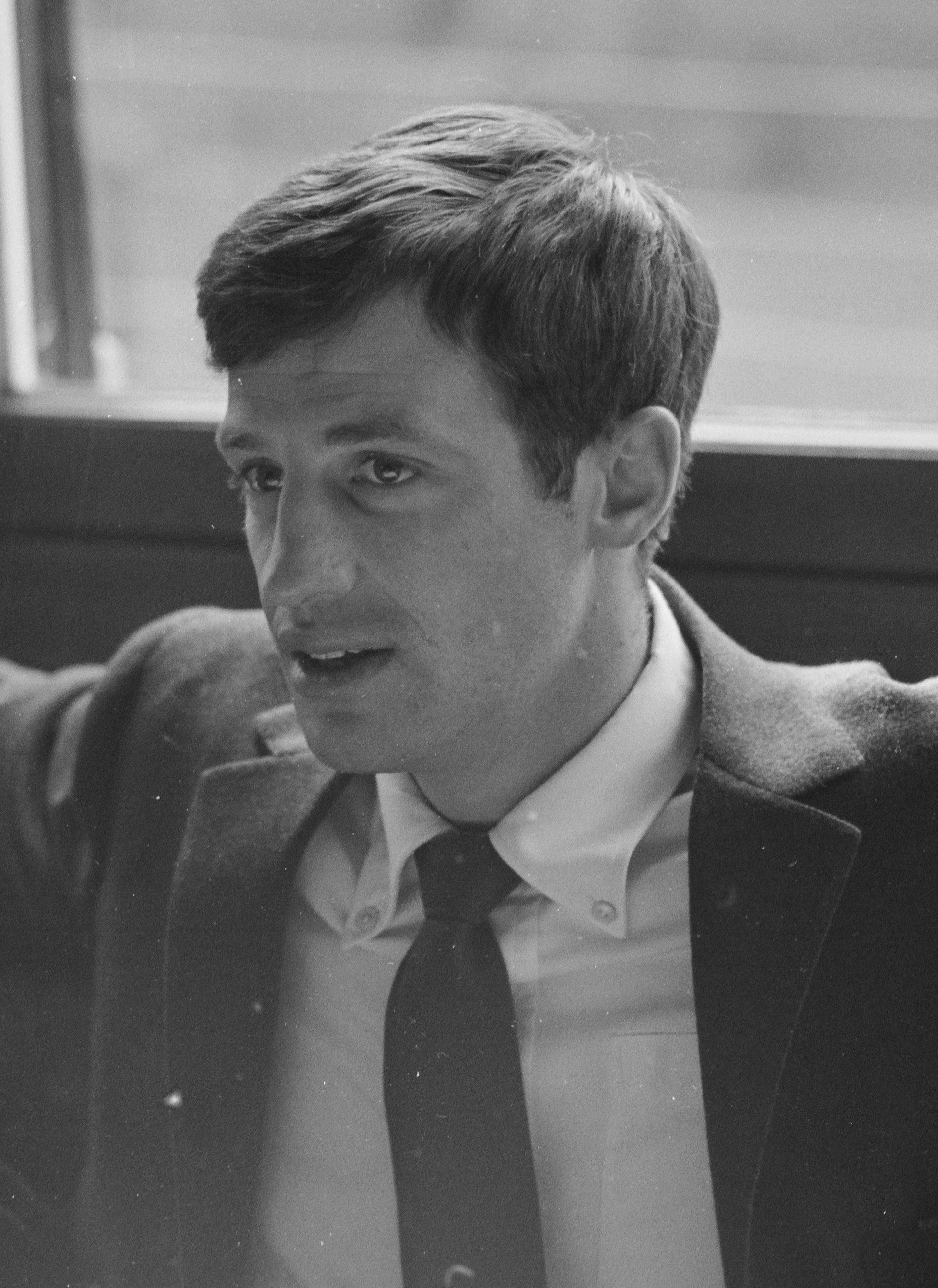
Pattinson describes Jean-Paul Belmondo as his favourite actor.

According to Alex Moshakis of The Guardian, Pattinson usually plays "complex, often oddball characters". He enjoys playing characters who are the opposite of his real-life personality, which he describes as completely normal, straightforward, and low-key, stating, "I find it fascinating when people make bad decisions [...] the humour and the befuddlement". Instead of staying in character for the entire production, Pattinson prefers to concentrate his energy solely while the camera is rolling. He describes his acting approach as "sprinting up to a cliff and just jumping off it", admitting that "sometimes it doesn't even work and you just look like a lunatic", but other times, it "stops your thinking, which is my favourite place to be". To create a more realistic setting, he often tries to "do whatever [he] can to not know what's going on [...] to be completely overwhelmed and disorientated [...] and feel like it's actually happening". Pattinson has employed a range of intense methods to get into character, including throwing up on set, arriving intoxicated, and isolating himself in a basement. He revealed that during the filming of The Drama (2026), he went "crazy for three days".

GQ's Daniel Riley describes Pattinson's career as being shaped by a combination of "talent, desire, luck, attendant fame, and bold choices". Pattinson says that he can only have ideas when he has an "enormous amount" of adrenaline. He is also an avid consumer of others' work, believing that constant reading and viewing improves his taste and tone, allowing him to collaborate more effectively with filmmakers in creating eccentric characters. Pattinson's choice to take "interesting, uncommercial roles" has resulted in him starring "in some of the best films of the [2010s] decade" according to The Guardian's Steve Rose. TheWrap's Alex Welch concluded that Pattinson established himself as "one of the biggest movie stars on the planet [...] thanks to [his] willingness to take risks and push himself", becoming an actor whose films "are not only worth taking seriously but actively seeking out".

Pattinson described Jean-Paul Belmondo as "the coolest actor who ever lived", and names his film Pierrot le Fou (1965) as one of his favourites. His acting style has been influenced by several different people and films. For example, Al Pacino's performance in the epic gangster film The Godfather (1972) and Kurt Cobain were some of his influences for his performance in The Batman, while he cited Steve-O and Johnny Knoxville from Jackass: The Movie (2002) as his inspirations for Mickey 17 (2025). Several auteur directors he has collaborated with—including David Cronenberg, Claire Denis, Robert Eggers, and the Safdie brothers—have purportedly played a significant role in shaping the way he acts.

== Public image ==
Pattinson's sex appeal has been widely discussed in the media, and several critics have called him a sex symbol. People included him in its "Sexiest Men Alive" list in both 2008 and 2009. In 2009, Glamour UK named him the "Sexiest Man Alive", while AskMen ranked him among the top 49 most influential men. That year, Vanity Fair also declared him "the most handsome man in the world" alongside Angelina Jolie as the most beautiful woman. Both GQ and Glamour named him the "Best Dressed Man" of 2010, with the former praising his elegance and modern appeal. That same year, People also featured him in its "World's Most Beautiful" issue. Pattinson was among Vanity Fair's "Top Hollywood Earners of 2009", with estimated earnings of $18 million. As of 2025, his films have grossed over $4.7 billion worldwide.

Some media and fans call Pattinson "RPattz", a nickname to which the actor has expressed his aversion, jokingly threatening to "strangle" the person who came up with it. In 2010, The Sunday Times included Pattinson in its "Rich List" of young millionaires in the United Kingdom, estimating his net worth at £13 million. That year, Time named him one of the 100 most influential people in the world, while Forbes featured him on its Celebrity 100 list. Also in 2010, Pattinson won two BBC Radio 1 Teen Awards for Best Dressed and Best Actor. In February 2014, he appeared on the cover of World Film Locations: Toronto, a book exploring films shot in the city.

In 2011, Vanity Fair ranked Pattinson fifteenth on its "Hollywood Top 40" list, citing his $27.5 million earnings from 2010. GQ once again named him the "Best Dressed Man" in 2012, while Glamour called him "Sexiest Man Alive" that October. By 2013, Pattinson placed second on Glamour's "Richest UK Celebs Under 30" list, with an estimated fortune of £45 million. He was also recognised by the London Evening Standard as one of the city's most influential figures in both 2013 and 2014. In October 2014, Heat ranked him third on its "Annual Rich List of Young British Stars", reporting earnings of $82.89 million. Forbes also found him to be the thirteenth-highest-paid actor of the year, with earnings of $20 million.

== Personal life ==
Pattinson is private about his personal life and has often expressed a dislike for the paparazzi industry and tabloid journalism. In 2017, he said that he had experienced anxiety beginning in his early years in the public spotlight.

In mid-2009, Pattinson became romantically linked to his Twilight co-star Kristen Stewart. In July 2012, Stewart was photographed with director Rupert Sanders, with whom she was having an affair. Sanders, who was married at the time, publicly apologised for the affair, as did Stewart. Pattinson and Stewart briefly separated but reconciled later that year, before separating permanently in May 2013. Pattinson began dating singer-songwriter FKA Twigs in September 2014. They became engaged but ended their relationship in October 2017.

Since 2018, Pattinson has been in a relationship with English singer-songwriter and actress Suki Waterhouse. They are engaged and had their first child, a daughter, in March 2024. The family lives in Los Angeles.

== Acting credits and accolades ==
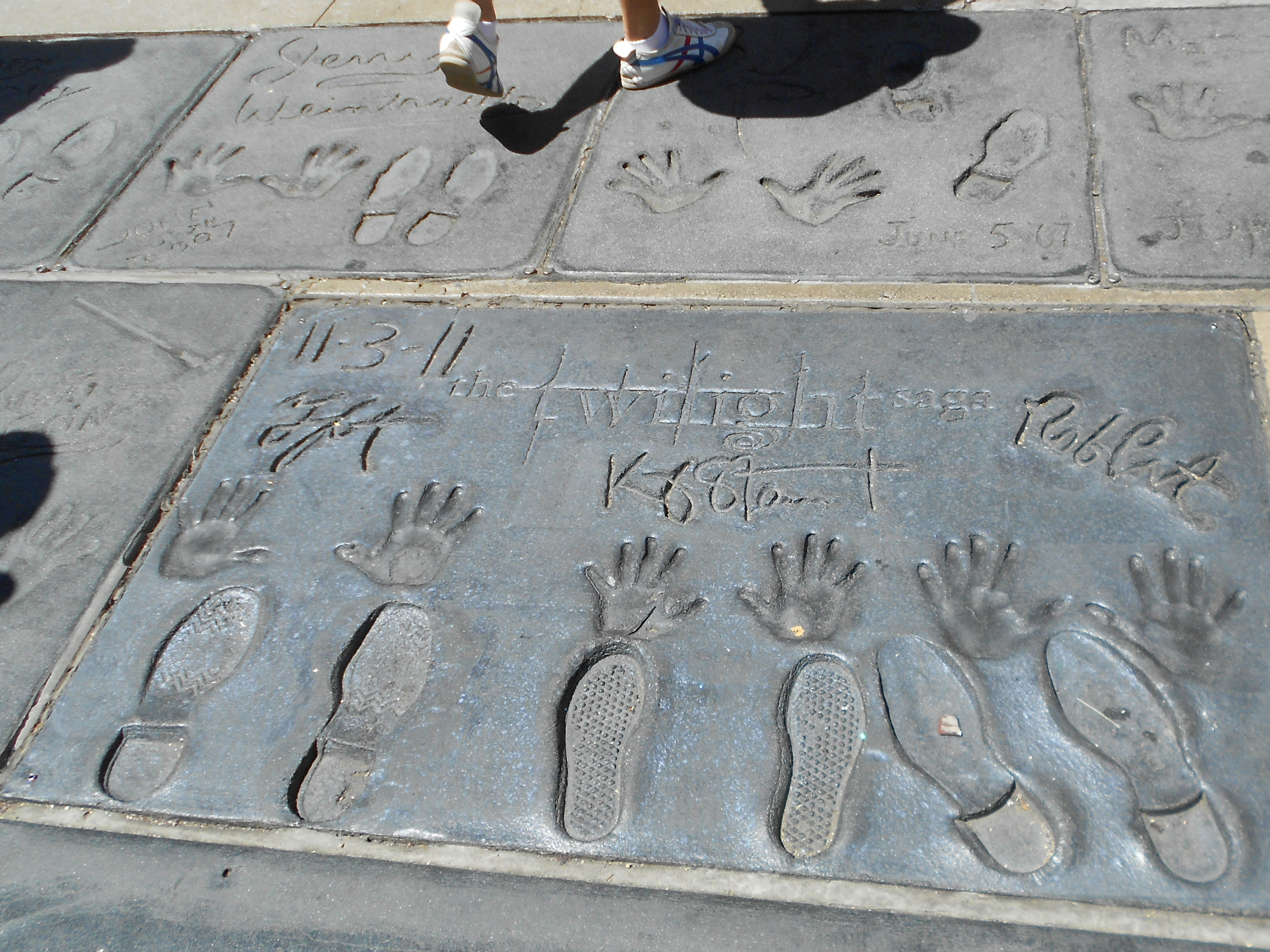
Handprints, footprints and signatures of (from left to right) Lautner, Stewart and Pattinson

According to the review aggregate site Rotten Tomatoes, Pattinson's highest-rated films include Harry Potter and the Goblet of Fire (2005), The Childhood of a Leader (2015), The Lost City of Z (2016), Good Time (2017), High Life (2018), The Lighthouse (2019), The Batman (2022), The Boy and the Heron (2023), Mickey 17 (2025), The Odyssey (2026), and Primetime (2026). His accolades include nominations for an AACTA Award, a Canadian Screen Award, a Gotham Award and two Independent Spirit Awards.

Wax statues of Pattinson were added to the Madame Tussauds museums in London and New York City in 2010. Pattinson, alongside his Twilight co-stars, Kristen Stewart and Taylor Lautner, put their signatures, hand and foot prints in wet concrete at Grauman's Chinese Theatre on 3 November 2011. In 2014, Russian astronomer Timur Kryachko named an asteroid he had discovered after Pattinson, as 246789 Pattinson.

== Bibliography ==
- Adams, Isabelle (2009). Robert Pattinson. HarperCollins. ISBN 978-0-06-193583-1.
- Empey, Julia A.; Kilbourn, Russell J.A. (2023). Feminist Posthumanism in Contemporary Science Fiction Film and Media. Bloomsbury Publishing. ISBN 978-1-5013-9842-1.
- Oliver, Sarah (2015). Robert Pattinson. John Blake Publishing. ISBN 978-1-78418-603-6.
- Stenning, Paul (2009). The Robert Pattinson Album. Plexus. ISBN 978-0-85965-438-8.
- Ue, Tom (2014). World Film Locations: Toronto. Bristol: Intellect Books. ISBN 978-1-78320-287-4. OCLC 1101751362.

Preceded by Daniel Craig	Actor of James Bond; 2026–present	Succeeded by Incumbent
