= Cosmopolis (film) =

- Theatrical release poster
- Directed by: David Cronenberg
- Screenplay by: David Cronenberg
- Based on: Cosmopolis by Don DeLillo
- Produced by: David Cronenberg; Paulo Branco; Renee Tab; Martin Katz
- Starring: Robert Pattinson; Paul Giamatti; Samantha Morton; Sarah Gadon; Mathieu Amalric; Juliette Binoche; Jay Baruchel; Kevin Durand
- Cinematography: Peter Suschitzky
- Edited by: Ronald Sanders
- Music by: Howard Shore; Metric
- Production companies: Alfama Films; Prospero Pictures; Kinologic Films (DC); France 2 Cinéma
- Distributed by: Entertainment One (Canada); Stone Angels (France)
- Release dates: 25 May 2012 (Cannes, France, and Italy); 31 May 2012 (Portugal); 8 June 2012 (Canada)
- Running time: 109 minutes
- Countries: Canada; France
- Language: English
- Budget: $20.5 million
- Box office: $7.1 million

Cosmopolis is a 2012 drama film written, produced, and directed by David Cronenberg. It stars Robert Pattinson, Paul Giamatti, Samantha Morton, Sarah Gadon, Mathieu Amalric, Juliette Binoche, Jay Baruchel and Kevin Durand. It is based on Don DeLillo's 2003 novel of the same name.

On 25 May 2012, the film premiered in competition for the Palme d'Or at the 2012 Cannes Film Festival. The film was released in Canada on 8 June 2012, and began a limited release in the United States on 17 August 2012 by eOne Films. It is Cronenberg's first script since eXistenZ in 1999. It received polarizing reviews on both Rotten Tomatoes and Metacritic and performed poorly at the box office.

== Plot ==
Twenty-eight-year-old billionaire and currency speculator Eric Packer rides slowly across Manhattan amid traffic jams, in his state-of-the-art luxury stretch limousine office, to his preferred barber. Various visitors discuss the meaning of life and inconsequential trivia. The traffic jams are caused by a visit of the President of the United States and the funeral of Eric's favorite musician, a rap artist whose music he plays in one of his two private elevators. Despite devastating currency speculation losses over the course of the day, Packer fantasizes about buying the Rothko Chapel.

He meets his wife, Elise, in her taxi, for coffee, in a bookstore, as well as outside a theater. She declines sex with him. Packer has sex with two other women. When a day of poor trading destroys a large part of his wealth, his wife takes this as a reason to dissolve their union.

Anti-capitalist activists demonstrate on the street. They wave rats and declare, "A spectre is haunting the world: the spectre of capitalism", paraphrasing the first lines of The Communist Manifesto. They spray-paint Packer's limo and later subject him to a pieing. Packer learns that an assassin has targeted him, but seems uninterested in who the person might be.

In Eric's car, his doctor performs his daily medical checkup. Eric worries about the doctor's finding that he has an asymmetrical prostate. As the currency speculation wipes out most of his fortune, Eric's world begins to disintegrate. Eventually he kills his bodyguard. At the destination, the barber, who knew his father, cuts Eric's hair on one side. The barber and limo driver discuss their respective careers driving cabs. The barber gives Eric his gun because he threw away the bodyguard's.

Eric follows a path of further self-destruction, visiting his potential murderer, former employee Richard Sheets, a.k.a. Benno Levin. Eric seems ready to commit suicide, but instead deliberately shoots himself in the hand. Sheets, who feels adrift in the capitalist system, explains that Eric's mistake in speculating was looking for perfect symmetry and patterns in the currency market: he should have looked for the lopsided—his body with its asymmetrical prostate was telling him this. As Sheets points the gun to Eric's head, Eric seems to have overcome his fear of death as he waits for Sheets to pull the trigger. Eric's fate is left unknown.

== Cast ==
- Robert Pattinson as Eric Packer
- Sarah Gadon as Elise Packer (née Shifrin), Eric's wife
- Paul Giamatti as Benno Levin
- Kevin Durand as Torval, Eric's Chief of Security
- Abdul Ayoola as Ibrahim Hamadou, Eric's driver
- Juliette Binoche as Didi Fancher, Eric's art consultant, with whom Eric has an affair
- Emily Hampshire as Jane Melman, Eric's Chief of Finance
- Bob Bainborough as Dr. Ingram, Eric's physician
- Samantha Morton as Vija Kinsky, Eric's Chief of Theory
- Zeljko Kecojevic as Danko, Eric's veteran bodyguard
- Jay Baruchel as Shiner, Eric's Head of Technology and Cyber Security and startup partner
- Philip Nozuka as Michael Chin, Eric's young Systems Analyst
- Mathieu Amalric as André Petrescu aka The Pastry Assassin
- Patricia McKenzie as Kendra Hays, Eric's new bodyguard, with whom Eric has an affair
- K'naan as Brutha Fez, a rap artist who is one of Eric's favorite musicians

== Production ==
News about a film adaptation of Cosmopolis first emerged on 10 February 2009. Screen Daily called it Paulo Branco's "most ambitious project to date" and estimated the budget at $10m–12 million. On 26 July 2009, David Cronenberg was announced as the director. The film was scheduled to begin filming in 2010, produced by Branco's production house Alfama Films and Cronenberg's Toronto Antenna Ltd. Branco said Cronenberg had written the screenplay and had moved on to casting in September 2009. On 13 January 2010, Cronenberg said he was still committed to the film but had not started production. Principal photography took place in Toronto and was completed in July 2011. Colin Farrell was initially cast in the main role but left due to scheduling difficulties with Total Recall. He was later replaced by Pattinson. Marion Cotillard was involved in the project but also left because of scheduling conflicts.

== Music ==
The film's musical score is composed by Cronenberg's usual composer Howard Shore. He associated with the Canadian indie rock band Metric for the second time after their collaboration on a song for Twilight Saga: Eclipse soundtrack. Metric composed three songs for the film, along with Somali-Canadian rapper K'naan performing one song. The album was released on 4 June 2012.

== Reception ==
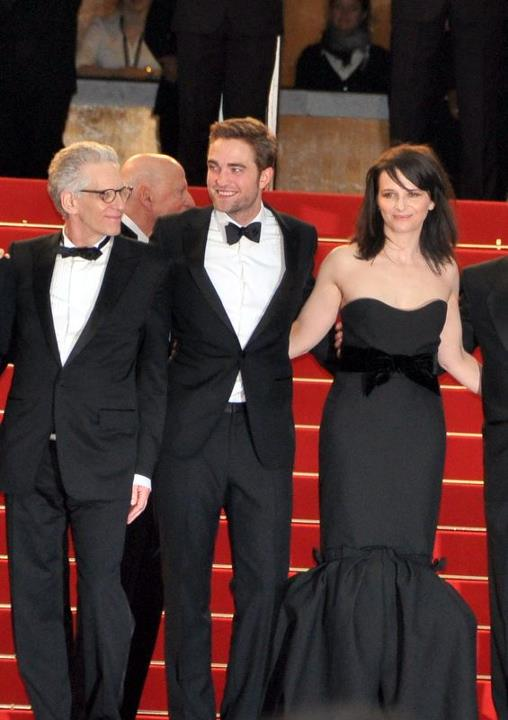
David Cronenberg, Robert Pattinson and Juliette Binoche promoting the film at the 2012 Cannes Film Festival

Rotten Tomatoes reports that 67% of 189 surveyed critics gave the film a positive review; the average rating is 6.10/10. The consensus says, "Though some may find it cold and didactic, Cosmopolis benefits from David Cronenberg's precise direction, resulting in a psychologically complex adaptation of Don DeLillo's novel." Metacritic assigned the film a weighted average score of 58 out of 100 based on 35 reviews, indicating "mixed or average reviews".

Justin Chang of Variety wrote: "An eerily precise match of filmmaker and material, Cosmopolis probes the soullessness of the 1% with the cinematic equivalent of latex gloves. ... Pattinson's excellent performance reps an indispensable asset." Robbie Collin of The Telegraph gave the film four stars out of five, stating:

It's a smart inversion of Cronenberg's 1999 film eXistenZ: rather than being umbilically connected to a virtual world, Packer is hermetically sealed off from the real one. At its heart is a sensational central performance from Robert Pattinson as Packer. Pattinson plays him like a human caldera; stony on the surface, with volcanic chambers of nervous energy and self-loathing churning deep below.

Ross Miller of Thoughts On Film also gave the film four out of five stars stating that, "If, like me, you're in-tune with the tone, style and direction of the film then it provides for a fascinating and intellectually nourishing experience." Owen Gleiberman of Entertainment Weekly stated,

Cosmopolis includes its own version of the Occupy hordes: scruffy, vengeful protesters who run around the streets, and into restaurants, brandishing the bodies of dead rats. ... Pattinson, pale and predatory even without his pasty-white vampire makeup, delivers his frigid pensées with rhythmic confidence.

A very positive review came from The London Film Review, which said "The fact is, Cronenberg made a movie for YOU. The 99%. A movie that reflects, comments on[,] satirizes and parodies our time." However, Todd McCarthy of The Hollywood Reporter criticized the film, writing:

Lifeless, stagey and lacking a palpable subversive pulse despite the ready opportunities offered by the material, this stillborn adaptation of Don DeLillo's novel initially will attract some Robert Pattinson fans but will be widely met with audience indifference.

Cahiers du Cinéma named it the year's second-best title, while Sight & Sound listed it as the eighth-best film of 2012. Keith Uhlich of Time Out New York named Cosmopolis the tenth-best film of 2012.

Film critic Amy Taubin named Cosmopolis one of her ten favorite films of all time when she participated in the 2012 Sight & Sound critics' poll.

Roger Ebert rated it 2 stars out of 4, saying: "“Cosmopolis” is flawlessly directed. Yes, it is. I can’t easily imagine a better screen version of the DeLillo novel, although I don’t much want to imagine one at all. David Cronenberg is a master filmmaker, whose films sometimes fail to reverberate with me, but whose genius cannot be denied. There is a coldness and abstraction in much of his work, a heartlessness."

== Accolades ==
| Year | Award | Category | Recipient | Result |
|---|---|---|---|---|
| 2012 | Cannes Film Festival | Palme d'Or | David Cronenberg | Nominated |
| 2012 | World Soundtrack Academy | Soundtrack Composer of the Year | Howard Shore | Nominated |
| 2013 | Canadian Screen Awards | Adapted Screenplay | David Cronenberg | Nominated |
| 2013 | Canadian Screen Awards | Achievement in Music: Original Score | Howard Shore | Won |
| 2013 | Canadian Screen Awards | Achievement in Music: Original Song | Emily Haines, James Shaw and Howard Shore, "Long to Live" | Won |
| 2013 | Online Film Critics Society | Best Adapted Screenplay | David Cronenberg | Nominated |
| 2013 | Vancouver Film Critics Circle | Best Film – Canadian | | Nominated |
| 2013 | Vancouver Film Critics Circle | Best Director – Canadian Film | David Cronenberg | Nominated |
| 2013 | Vancouver Film Critics Circle | Best Actor in a Canadian Film | Robert Pattinson | Nominated |
| 2013 | Vancouver Film Critics Circle | Best Supporting Actress in a Canadian Film | Samantha Morton | Nominated |
| 2013 | Vancouver Film Critics Circle | Best Supporting Actress in a Canadian Film | Sarah Gadon | Won |
| 2013 | Saturn Award | Best DVD/Blu-ray Release | | Nominated |
