= Long Beach International Film Festival =

- Location: Long Beach, New York, United States
- Founded: 2012
- Festival date: Late September
- Language: International
- Website: http://www.longbeachfilm.com

The Long Beach International Film Festival (LBIFF) is an international film festival founded in 2012, the festival has since taken place every year in Long Beach and in Rockville Centre, New York. The Long Beach International Film Festival celebrates the art of storytelling through cinema. The festival presents shorts, fiction and documentary formats, the LBIFF mission is to exhibit films that convey a fresh voice and differing perspectives.

== History ==
The Long Beach International Film Festival began in late summer of 2012 and showcased nine short films and documentaries during the innaugrational event.

On October 29, 2012, Hurricane Sandy struck Long Beach. As a result of flooding, the city's only movie theater, Long Beach Cinemas, was destroyed. Due to the loss of the theater and the citywide rebuilding after the storm the 2013 film festival was in jeopardy. The founders, Ingrid Dodd and Craig Weintraub, secured a $20,000 grant from Nassau County to organize a small program for the 2013 season.

Each year the festival screens the “Shorts on the Beach” portion of the LBIFF program on the sands of Long Beach and open to the public and free of charge.

The 2015 festival is scheduled to take place in City of Long Beach and Rockville Centre from September 24–27, 2015, where the festival will screen an international slate of over 50 films, including feature-length narrative, documentary, short, animated and student films.

== Awards presented ==
The Long Beach International Film Festival is a competitive festival that offer awards in a variety of categories. The festival's "Gala Awards Ceremony," is held the Sunday night of the festival are given for Jury, Festival Honors and Audience Awards.
