= How to Be =

2008 film by Oliver Irving

- Slamdance Film Festival Poster
- Directed by: Oliver Irving
- Written by: Oliver Irving
- Produced by: Justin Kelly
- Starring: Robert Pattinson; Rebecca Pidgeon; Jeremy Hardy; Powell Jones; Michael Irving
- Cinematography: Paul Swann
- Edited by: Reuben Irving
- Music by: Joe Hastings
- Distributed by: IFC Films
- Release dates: 18 January 2008 (Slamdance Film Festival); 29 April 2009 (United States)
- Running time: 84 minutes
- Country: United Kingdom
- Language: English
- Budget: £250,000

How to Be is a 2008 independent comedy-drama film written and directed by Oliver Irving. It is about a young man named Art, played by Robert Pattinson, in a quarter-life crisis. It premiered in competition at 2008 Slamdance Film Festival on 18 January 2008. It was selected to open the 2008 Strasbourg International Film Festival, where Pattinson received a Best Actor in a Feature award.

== Plot ==
Art (Pattinson) is not talented, but aspires to be a musician. He has a dead-end job at a supermarket, despite having a degree (which he doesn't seem to value much). His girlfriend ends their relationship. Art is then forced to move back home with his cold and neglectful parents (played by Pidgeon and Michael Irving). Art buys a book titled, It's Not Your Fault. Upon reading it, he tries to follow the self-help book's advice. He decides to use inheritance money to first buy a car, and then pay for a Canadian therapist, Dr. Levi Ellington (Jones), the book's author, to come to his home in England and help Art get his life on track, about which his parents are less than thrilled.

Despite his unsupportive parents, Art attempts with his new life coach and two slightly unbalanced friends Nikki (Pearce) and Ronnie (White) to find a balance in his life, true happiness, and a good relationship with his parents.

The film also stars Jeremy Hardy as Art's superior at the care centre at which he volunteers.

== Cast ==
- Robert Pattinson as Art
- Rebecca Pidgeon as Art's Mother
- Jeremy Hardy as Jeremy
- Powell Jones as Dr. Ellington
- Michael Irving as Art's Father
- Johnny White as Ronnie
- Mike Pearce as Nikki
- Bart kusse as Child Art

== Production ==
Casting for the film took more than a year. Initially Simon Amstell was attached to the project. Talking about Pattinson's casting, Irving said: "He understood what we wanted to achieve, he was musical and had completely the right look. To find all those elements was incredible: the final piece in the puzzle."

For his role of awkward and geeky musician in the film, Irving said Pattinson's looks were altered: "I said, 'You're banned from cutting your hair between now and the shoot, we had to give him the most awkward haircut we possibly could, and we cut his trouser length a little bit too high. Things like that played down his apparent good looks." About Pattinson's musical abilities, he added: "He downplayed how good he was, a lot of the time he would turn out to have a really good technique (while playing the guitar and harmonica) and we told him he needed to play it more simply."

Filming took place in early 2007.

== Distribution ==
How to Be was released in the United States by IFC Festival Direct on 29 April 2009. Leading up to the release, the director, Oliver Irving, took the film on a United States screening tour. The DVD was released first in the United Kingdom on 18 May 2009 and was released in the United States on 17 November 2009.

== Music ==
How to Be Soundtrack : Original Motion Picture Soundtrack

Soundtrack album by Joe Hastings & various artists
- Released: 28 April 2009 (U.S.)
- Recorded: Various times
- Genre: Soundtrack
- Label: Dreamboat Records
- Producers: Joe Hastings and Gary Moore

The score for the film was composed by Joe Hastings and songs for the album was chosen by music supervisor Gary Moore. The album contain 23-tracks, three original songs performed by Robert Pattinson and by musician-actor Johnny White, who plays Ronny in the film. It also features "Old Man" by Love, "Clear Spot" by Captain Beefheart and "Hammond Song" by The Roches. The album was released by Dreamboat Records on 28 April 2009.

=== Track listing ===
1. Opening Credits - Joe Hastings
2. "Chokin' on the Dust" (Part 1) - Robert Pattinson
3. "It's not your fault" - Joe Hastings
4. "Hell Awaits" - The Rollercoaster Project
5. "You don’t actually have things all that bad"
6. "Old Man" - Love
7. "Chokin' on the Dust" (Part 2) - Robert Pattinson
8. "Sometimes we all need a little help" - Joe Hastings
9. "Dr Ellington Arrives" - Joe Hastings
10. "Visualize a time" - Joe Hastings
11. "Jam Session"
12. "1996" - The Rollercoaster Project
13. "Nikki's Song" - Mike Pearce
14. "Puzzle" - Joe Hastings
15. "Cemetery" - Joe Hastings
16. "Off License" - Joe Hastings
17. "Process 1" - The Rollercoaster Project
18. "Clear Spot" - Captain Beefheart
19. "Hammond Song" - The Roches
20. "Final Call" - Joe Hastings
21. "You're not a nobody"
22. "Doin' Fine" - Robert Pattinson
23. End Credits - Joe Hastings

== Reception ==
=== Critical response ===
The film received mixed reviews. Geo Euzebio from Cineplayer criticized said it "seems more of the same: A dramedy about characters and dysfunctional families, with humor and structure based on American independent comedy". She added: "Pattinson's performance is interesting and he hits the pitch with the pseudo-musician who only scratches few chords on the guitar, but still want to live their art."

Peter Debruge from Variety gave the film a negative review: "It is a taxing reminder that middle-class depression ranks among cinema's least engaging topics."

=== Film festivals ===
How to Be had its world premiere at the 2008 Slamdance Film Festival, where it won the Grand Jury Honorable Mention. It has since been chosen to appear at:

- Rhode Island International Film Festival (5–10 August 2008)
- Strasbourg International Film Festival, where it was the opening night film (12–21 September 2008)
- Calgary International Film Festival (19–28 September 2008)
- Derby City Film Festival (8–12 October 2008)
- New Orleans Film Festival (10–16 October 2008)
- Indie 2008 Film Festival, Brazil (10–16 October 2008)
- Austin Film Festival (16–23 October 2008)
- Gotham Screen New York International Festival (31 October-1 November 2008)
- Lone Star International Film Festival (12–16 November 2008)
- Cinequest Film Festival (28 February-2 March 2009)
- Durango Film Festival (4–8 March 2009)
- George Lindsey UNA Film Festival (5–8 March 2009)
- Chicago International Movie and Music Festival (8 March 2009)
- DC Independent Film Festival (8 March 2009)
- Burbank International Film Festival (27 March 2009)
- Las Vegas International Film Festival (9–12 April 2009)
- California Independent Film Festival (16 April 2009)
- 22nd Singapore International Film Festival (25 April 2009)
- First Glance Hollywood Film Festival (1–3 May 2009)

== Accolades ==
Accolades
Year	Award / Film Festival	Category	Recipient(s)	Result
2008	New Orleans Film Festival	Best Narrative Feature - Audience Award	Oliver Irving	Won
2008	Slamdance Film Festival	Special Jury Honorable Mention for Narrative Feature	Oliver Irving	Won
2008	Strasbourg International Film Festival	Best Actor	Robert Pattinson	Won
2009	George Lindsey UNA Film Festival	Special Jury Honorable Mention for Professional Full - Length Narrative Golden Lion Award	Oliver Irving	Won
2009	Washington DC Independent Film Festival	Audience Award - Best Feature	Oliver Irving	Won
2009	Washington DC Independent Film Festival	Grand Jury Award - Best Feature	Oliver Irving	Won
