= Remember Me (2010 film) =

2010 American film by Alan Coulter

- Theatrical release poster
- Directed by: Allen Coulter
- Written by: Will Fetters
- Produced by: Nicholas Osborne; Trevor Engelson
- Starring: Robert Pattinson; Emilie de Ravin; Chris Cooper; Lena Olin; Tate Ellington; Pierce Brosnan
- Cinematography: Jonathan Freeman
- Edited by: Andrew Mondshein
- Music by: Marcelo Zarvos
- Production company: Underground Films
- Distributed by: Summit Entertainment
- Release dates: March 1, 2010 (Paris Theatre); March 12, 2010 (United States)
- Running time: 108 minutes
- Country: United States
- Language: English
- Budget: $16 million
- Box office: $56 million

Remember Me is a 2010 American coming-of-age romantic tragedy film directed by Allen Coulter and written by Will Fetters. It stars Robert Pattinson, Emilie de Ravin, Chris Cooper, Lena Olin, and Pierce Brosnan.

Remember Me premiered on March 1, 2010, at the Paris Theatre in New York City and was released by Summit Entertainment on March 12. The film received generally negative reviews from critics and grossed $56 million against a production budget of $16 million.

== Plot ==
In 1991, Ally Craig witnesses her mother Helen being mugged and fatally shot on a New York subway station platform.

Ten years later, Ally is a student at NYU, and lives with her father Neil, an NYPD detective, in Queens. Tyler Hawkins audits classes at NYU and works at the Strand Bookstore. He and his sister Caroline have a strained relationship with their workaholic businessman father, Charles.

One night, Tyler and his best friend and roommate Aidan get involved in somebody else's fight, and are arrested by Neil, who unnecessarily hits Tyler. Aidan calls Charles to bail out Tyler, who refuses to talk with his father. When Aidan sees Neil dropping Ally off, he realizes she is Neil's daughter. So, he suggests Tyler get revenge on the detective by sleeping with, then dumping, Ally.

Ally and Tyler go to dinner, then continue seeing each other. After noticing a tattoo on Tyler's chest reading "Michael", he reveals to her that his brother Michael committed suicide years ago; Ally later reveals her mother's death. Aidan turns up at the apartment, meeting Ally for the first time and convinces them to go to a party.

As Ally drank too much, she stays over to sleep it off. The following morning, she tries to sneak in. However, Neil hits her when she stands up to him, so Ally flees back to Tyler's apartment, where they have sex.

Tyler's sister Caroline is a budding young artist who is featured in an art show. She tries to get their father to attend, but he fails to show. Caroline is heartbroken, so Tyler confronts him in a boardroom filled with people. He accuses his father of willingly distancing himself from his children to avoid feeling the pain of losing another child, so father and son come to blows.

When Neil's partner recognizes Tyler with Ally on a train, Neil breaks into his apartment. Recognizing him, Neil discovers Tyler's initial reason for meeting Ally and reacts violently. This forces Tyler to confess to a distraught Ally. Later, Aidan visits her at her father's home to explain it was his fault, and that Tyler is genuinely in love with her.

Caroline is bullied by classmates at a birthday party, where they cut off a chunk of her hair. Ally and Aidan visit Tyler's mother's apartment, where Caroline is sobbing. Tyler accompanies his sister back to school, and following further bullying, he reacts violently and is arrested. Charles again bails out his son, but this time vows to exert his power over the school's board of trustees to force the bullies to leave. Charles asks Tyler to meet his lawyers at his office the next morning.

Tyler spends the night with Ally, and they declare their love for each other. The next morning, Charles advises Tyler he will be late, as he is taking Caroline to school. Happy their dad is spending time with his sister, he tells him he will wait in his office. Looking on Charles's computer, Tyler sees a slideshow of pictures with him and his siblings when they were younger.

Caroline arrives at her classroom, where the teacher writes the date as Tuesday, September 11, 2001. Tyler looks out the window of his father's office, which is revealed to be located on the north edge of the 101st floor in the North Tower of the World Trade Center.

As the camera pans over Tyler's family and friends observing the terrorist attacks and the rubble from the World Trade Center, a voice-over of Tyler's diary declares his love for Michael, forgiving him for killing himself. Tyler, who died in the collapsed tower, is buried next to his brother.

Some time later, Caroline and Charles seem to have a healthy father-daughter relationship; Aidan, who has since gotten a tattoo of Tyler's name on his arm, is working hard in college; and Ally, who has not ridden the subway since Helen was killed, gets on a train at the same station where she died.

== Cast ==
- Robert Pattinson as Tyler Hawkins, Charles and Diane's son, Michael and Caroline's brother
- Emilie de Ravin as Alyssa "Ally" Craig, Neil and Helen's daughter
- Chris Cooper as Sergeant Neil Craig, a police sergeant, Ally's father
- Lena Olin as Diane Hirsch, Michael, Tyler and Caroline's mother
- Tate Ellington as Aidan Hall, Tyler's best friend and roommate
- Ruby Jerins as Caroline Hawkins, Charles and Diane's daughter, Michael and Tyler's sister
- Pierce Brosnan as Charles Hawkins, Michael, Tyler and Caroline's father
- Kate Burton as Janine, Charles' executive assistant
- Gregory Jbara as Les Hirsch, Diane's new partner
- Martha Plimpton as Helen Craig, Ally's mother
- Peyton Roi List as Samantha

== Soundtrack ==
The official Remember Me soundtrack album was released on March 9, 2010. An album of the score composed by Marcelo Zarvos was also released. The movie contained 26 credited songs, while the soundtrack album contained 14 of them, including songs by Sigur Rós, The Beta Band, Ani Difranco, Supergrass, and National Skyline. A Pakistani song, "Saason ki Mala Peh Simroon" by Nusrat Fateh Ali Khan, is also heard in the movie when Tyler takes Ally on their first date at Gandhi Restaurant.

== Reception ==
Review aggregator Rotten Tomatoes reports that 26% of 136 critics gave the film a positive review, with an average rating of 4.5/10. The site's critics' consensus reads, "Its leads are likeable, but Remember Me suffers from an overly maudlin script and a borderline offensive final twist." Metacritic gives it a weighted average score of 40 out of 100, based on 29 critics, indicating "mixed or average reviews". Audiences polled by CinemaScore gave the film an average grade of "B" on an A+ to F scale.

Todd McCarthy gave the film a mixed review in Variety, writing, "The modestly scaled film delivers some moving and affecting moments amid a preponderance of scenes of frequently annoying people behaving badly." Andrea Gronvall gave a similar assessment in The Chicago Reader, writing, "Allen Coulter directed this morose and sluggish drama, which gets more mileage from Pattinson's anguished profile than from Will Fetters's thunderously overwritten screenplay." Derek Malcolm wrote in the London Evening Standard, "Decently shot and directed as it is, it lacks any real flame." Kirk Honeycutt of The Hollywood Reporter gave the film a positive review, stating the "scenes between Pattinson and de Ravin exude genuine charm." Honeycutt goes on to say that the score and cinematography brought "notable sparkle to this heartfelt drama."

Jake Coyle of the Associated Press did not favor the film and said the "most pleasing thing about [the film] is its boldness. It may be affected, but [it] is at least aiming for an intriguing character study — a positive sign in the young career of Pattinson," who he says steps away from "Twilight, apparently in search of his Five Easy Pieces or Rebel Without a Cause." Lisa Schwarzbaum of Entertainment Weekly gave the film a D+, calling it a "shameless contraption of ridiculously sad things befalling attractive people." Schwarzbaum was also critical of Pattinson's acting and the script. Wesley Morris of The Boston Globe gave the film a half star out of four, commenting that the film "crassly repurposes tragedy to excuse its clichés."

Several critics also found the movie's invocation of the September 11 attacks on the World Trade Center offensive and exploitative, such as Lisa Kennedy of The Denver Post, who wrote, "The finale manages to be tasteful and exploitative at the same time. It touts forgiveness while being mildly infuriating. Such is the danger of borrowing from the enormous to merely entertain. If that. Forgettable should be the last thing a movie touching on the events of 9/11 should be. Yet, Remember Me is just that." Elizabeth Weitzman of the New York Daily News also denounced the film's ending, writing, "There's no shame in exploring tragedy through art. But exploiting it to make your very ordinary movie feel more important? That's another story."

Roger Ebert generally liked the film, giving it three out of four stars and characterizing it as a "well-made movie. I cared about the characters. I felt for them. Liberate them from the plot's destiny, which is an anvil around their necks, and you might have something" but goes on to say it "tries to borrow profound meaning, but succeeds only in upstaging itself so overwhelmingly that its characters become irrelevant".

=== Awards and nominations ===
| Year | Ceremony | Award | Result |
|---|---|---|---|
| 2010 | Teen Choice Awards | Choice Movie: Drama | Nominated |
| 2010 | Teen Choice Awards | Choice Movie Actor: Drama – Robert Pattinson | Won |
| 2010 | Nickelodeon Australian Kids' Choice Awards | Favorite Movie Star – Robert Pattinson | Nominated |
| 2010 | Golden Raspberry Awards | Worst Actor – Robert Pattinson | Nominated |
