= Soho International Film Festival =

New York City film festival

SOHO International Film Festival
- Location: New York City, U.S.
- Founded: 2009
- Awards: Best Showcase Feature, Best Showcase Short, Audience Award
- Directors: Sibyl Reymundo-Santiago (Executive Director)
- Website: www.sohofilmfest.com

The SOHO International Film Festival (SIFFNYC) is an annual film festival held in New York City. Founded in 2009 by Jorge Ballos, the festival focuses on independent cinema, showcasing domestic and international feature films, shorts, documentaries, and series pilots. The festival is operated by the SOHO Creative Lab, a 501(c)(3) non-profit organization.

== History ==
The SOHO International Film Festival was founded in July 2009 by Jorge Ballos, a former talent agent. The inaugural event took place in February 2010 in the SoHo neighborhood of Manhattan. Initially launched as a three-day event, the festival has since expanded to a seven-day program.

In 2011, Sibyl Reymundo-Santiago joined the organization as Executive Director and Head of Programming. Over its history, the festival has moved between several New York City venues, including the Village East by Angelika and Regal Union Square. In 2024, the festival celebrated its 15th anniversary.

== Programs and Awards ==
The festival accepts submissions in various categories, including US Showcase and World Showcase for both features and shorts. It also features specialized categories for animated films and TV pilots.

Awards are presented by a jury of industry professionals. Notable past jurors and participants include Tricia Helfer, Reed Birney, Octavia Spencer, and Pierce Brosnan.

=== Major Categories ===
- Best Showcase Feature Film (US & World)
- Best Showcase Short Film (US & World)
- Best Showcase Documentary
- Audience Awards for Feature, Short, and Exhibition films
- Best Acting Performance (Leading and Ensemble)
