= Slamdance Film Festival =

Annual film festival held in Utah, USA

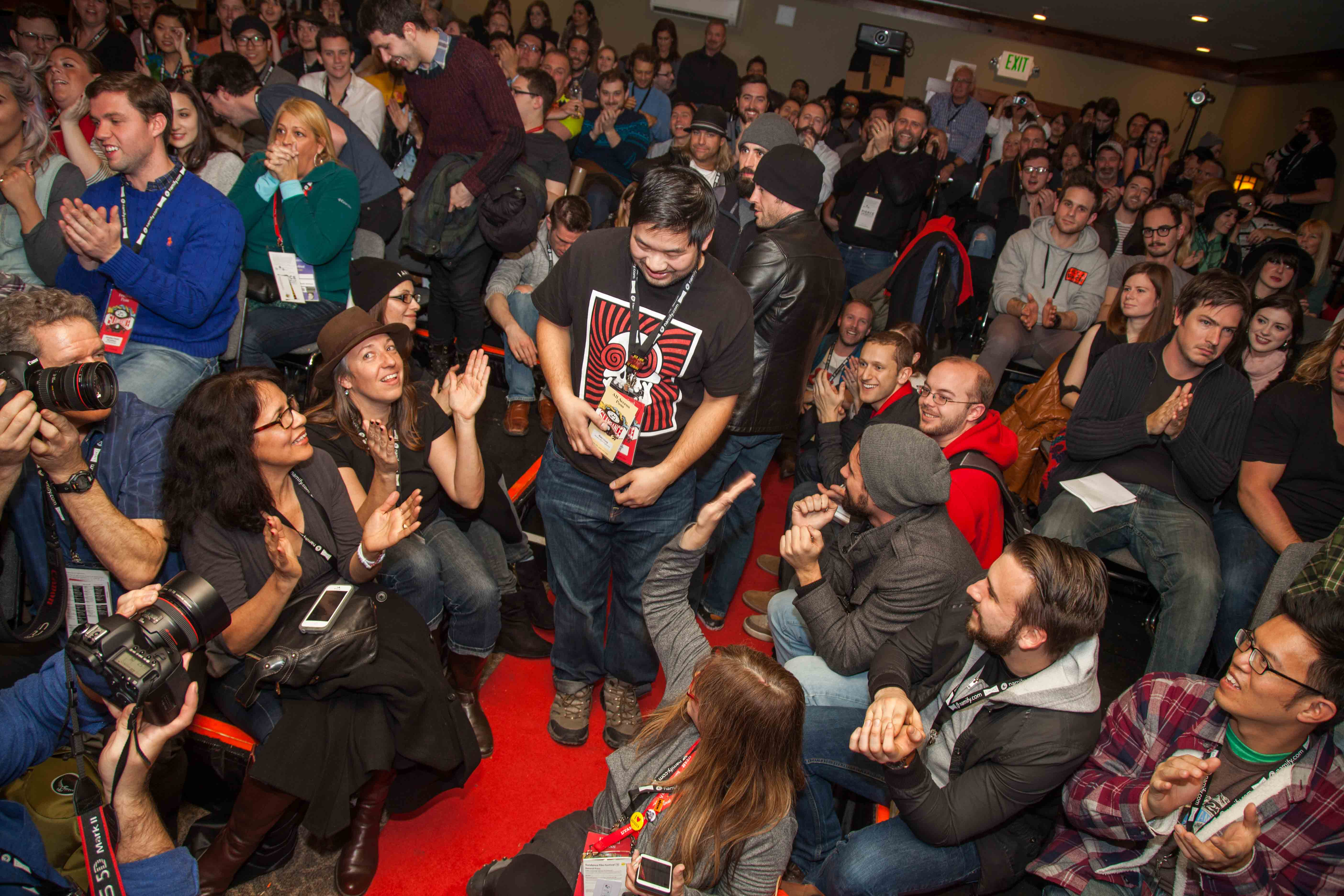
- Slamdance award ceremony 2015
- Location: Los Angeles, CA, U.S.
- Founded: 1995
- Most recent: 2026
- Language: English
- Website: slamdance.com
- 2027 2025

The Slamdance Film Festival is an annual film festival focused on emerging artists. The annual week-long festival is held in Los Angeles, California in late February and is the main event organized by the year-round Slamdance organization. The organization also hosts a screenplay competition, workshops, screenings throughout the year, and events with an emphasis on independent films with budgets under $1 million. Its alumni include Sean Baker, Jon M. Chu, Rian Johnson, Ari Aster, The Russo Brothers, Bong Joon Ho, Lena Dunham, Matt Johnson, Steven Soderbergh and Christopher Nolan.

== History ==
The festival was founded in 1995 by Dan Mirvish, Jon Fitzgerald, Shane Kuhn, and Peter Baxter in addition to Paul Rachman, after they had been unsuccessful in submitting films to the Sundance Film Festival in Park City, Utah. Baxter has been in charge of Slamdance since 1997.

== Screenplay competition ==
In addition to the festival, Slamdance's screenplay competition has discovered a number of talented screenwriters including Joshua Marston (Maria Full of Grace) as well as Steven Fechter and Nicole Kassell (co-writers of The Woodsman). In 2008, Slamdance entered into an agreement with Upload Films to develop and produce Drool, the winner of Slamdance's screenplay competition. Written and directed by Nancy Kissam, Drool premiered at the 2009 Festival and thereafter was acquired by Strand Releasing. Chad Crawford Kinkle's southern horror screenplay Jug Face won the 2011 Grand Prize. During the 2012 Festival, Modernciné producers Andrew van den Houten and Robert Tonino announced their production of Jug Face in Nashville.

In 2011, Dead in the Room, written by Marjory Kaptanoglu (winner of Slamdance's 2010 Short Screenplay Competition) was directed by Academy Award–nominated filmmaker Adam Pertofsky. In 2012, Harold's Bad Day, written by R.J. Buckley, was directed by Slamdance alum Jordan Brady. The 2011 Grand Prize winner Jug Face, written by Chad Crawford Kinkle, premiered at the 2013 festival, where it was picked up for distribution by Gravitas Ventures.

The 2013 Slamdance Screenwriting Competition, presented by JuntoBox Films, awarded prizes to the top three scripts in each category. The Grand Prize of $10,000 cash went to Butterfly Children by Melanie Schiele. The Short Screenplay winner Think Ink by Emily Hu was produced and premiered at the 2015 Festival, as part of the Special Screenings section. An original teleplay (Search for Life by Andrea Janakas) took home the Grand Prize at the 2014 Screenplay Competition. Search for Life was also given the award for Best Original Teleplay, the Best Narrative Feature was given to HF Crum's The 3 Faces of Hunger & Thirst, the Best Horror Screenplay was given to Sean Patrick Geraghty's The Hounds of House Rearden, and the Best Short Screenplay was given to David Shushan's Over the Line (And Far Away). The awards were given at the Writers Guild of America West in Los Angeles.

The 2015 Screenplay Competition received a record-breaking 50% increase in submissions, with nearly 3,500 total submissions. Narrative Feature script The Delegation by Shane Andries was awarded the Best Narrative Feature and Grand Prize Award, Best Horror Screenplay was awarded to Speak of the Devil by Jesse J. Cook, Best Short Screenplay was awarded to Deep Storage by Susan Earl, and the Best Teleplay was awarded to Castle Rock by Jamie King. The awards were given at the Writers Guild of America West in Los Angeles.

The 2016 Screenplay Competition received a record-breaking number of submissions, with 3,600 total scripts submitted. Narrative Feature script Great White Shark by Andrew Kightlinger was awarded the Best Narrative Feature and Grand Prize Award, Best Horror Screenplay was awarded to The Housesitter by Suju Vijayan, Best Short Screenplay was awarded to Conviction by Anju Andre-Bergmann, and Best Teleplay was awarded to Feral by Bryan Kett. The awards were given at the Writers Guild of America West in Los Angeles. Andrew Kightlinger has received representation from Principato-Young Entertainment and is currently in development on a new narrative feature which focuses on sex trafficking.

The 2017 Screenplay Competition received over 3,000 submissions. Horror Feature "Day Shift" by Tyler Tice was awarded $2,000 for Best Horror Screenplay and $8,000 for the Grand Prize Award. Best Narrative Feature was awarded to Escher by Jason Kessler, Best Short Screenplay was awarded to The Clown-Faced Plumber by Frederick Jones, and Best Teleplay to Jackrabbit by David Schlow. The awards were given at the Writers Guild of America West in Los Angeles.

== Slamdance on the Road ==
The Slamdance organization has established Slamdance on the Road, a traveling showcase supported by the festival and its filmmakers. On the Road brings popular Slamdance films to audiences that otherwise would not have the chance to see them and provide theatrical venues with an alternative film program experience. On the Road events usually happen in U.S. cities like New York, Los Angeles, Austin, and Detroit, but have also traveled to countries including Canada, China, Poland, France, and Chile.

== Slamdance Cinema Club ==
In 2015, as a further development of its theatrical distribution efforts, Slamdance announced a partnership with ArcLight Hollywood to produce and promote the Slamdance Cinema Club, which features two Slamdance films a month for the first three quarters of 2015.

== Slamdance Presents ==
In January 2010, Slamdance and Microsoft announced its partnership of year-round Slamdance Film programming on Xbox and Zune. Slamdance president and co-founder Peter Baxter said, “Slamdance has a true independent identity and proven track record of unearthing great films. It's time now to be progressive and unleash our film programs outside of the festival and directly help filmmakers find popular, worldwide audiences. The standard of Slamdance films deserve this much and we believe the audience will respond.”

As of opening day at the 2011 Festival, select Competition Feature Films were made available via Zune Video Marketplace as part of this year's Festival and VOD Showcase for the duration of the festival, January 20–27. Select films included narrative features Modern Imbecile's Planet World, Snow on tha Bluff by Damon Russell, and The Beast Pageant by Albert Birney & Jon Moses; documentary features Road Dogs and Scrapper, as well as films from previous years’ festivals. In 2013, Slamdance expanded its VOD business onto iTunes, Amazon, Google, Vudu, and PlayStation. Slamdance Studios acquired and released four Slamdance favorites and award winners through Cinedigm/New Video, including Monteith McCollum's Hybrid, Ron Eyal and Eleanor Burke's Stranger Things, Rudd Simmons' The First Season, and Daniel Martinico's OK, Good.

Also in 2013, "The Slam Collective" made Slamdance's first collaborative feature film called I Want to Be an American. In the spirit of the surrealist parlor game of chance Exquisite Corpse, 7 Slamdance filmmakers each made a documentary short film based on imagery forwarded on by the previous filmmaker in the chain. In January 2015, Slamdance Studios launched a streaming program on Hulu that includes Slamdance favorites and independent classics including Marc Levin's Slam, Cullen Hoback's Terms and Conditions May Apply, and Gerard Johnson's Tony. The Slamdance-produced short film "D.I.Y.", featuring conversations with prominent Slamdance alumni Christopher Nolan, Penelope Spheeris, and the Russo brothers premiered on the platform.

In 2015, Slamdance partnered with filmmakers Steve Yu and Diamond Dallas Page for a theatrical release of The Resurrection of Jake the Snake as the first title for Slamdance Presents, a distribution enterprise dedicated to creating theatrical and other commercial opportunities for independent filmmakers. The Resurrection Of Jake The Snake documents the rehabilitation of Jake Roberts and Scott Hall. The film played in the United States and Canada including Los Angeles, New York City, Chicago, Atlanta, Philadelphia, and Baltimore. After its VOD release, The Resurrection Of Jake The Snake became the number one documentary on iTunes. In 2017, Slamdance Presents acquired four award-winning and critically acclaimed films now available on VOD: Driftwood by Paul Taylor, Dead Hands Dig Deep by Jai Love, Without by Mark Jackson, and The Ground We Won by Christopher Pryor.

== Slamdance Digital, Interactive & Gaming ==
In 2015, Slamdance integrated digital, interactive, and immersive art into its program with the launch of DIG. DIG opened at Big Pictures Los Angeles on December 4, 2015, and showcased cutting-edge works in the field of digital storytelling. Featured projects included Pry by Tender Claws; The Visitor by James Kaelan, Eve M. Cohen, and Blessing Yen; Sleighting by Rachel Ho; Woman Without Mandolin by Fabiano Mixo; Simulacra by Theo Tagholm; Thumper by Drool; Memory of a Broken Dimension by XRA; Apoptosis by Kytten Janae; Line Wobbler by Robin Baumgarten; and TL;DR [the shape of the internet (Orgy)] by Theo Triantafyllidis.

In 2016, Slamdance DIG's second iteration expanded its program with the creative input of Dekker Dreyer and virtual reality network Littlstar. Featured projects included (THREE² x 3P2:VR) by Float (Kate Parsons & Ben Vance); Bad News by Expressive Intelligence Studio ([James Ryan, Ben Samuel, & Adam Summerville); Infinit-O by Corazon Del Sol; Manifold Garden by William Chyr; Natural History by Lillian Mehrel; Soundstage by Logan Olson; The Magic Dance Mirror by Kyle Ruddick; and You Must Be 18 or Older to Enter by Seemingly Pointless. DIG opened at Big Pictures Los Angeles on December 2, 2016 and was held at the Slamdance Film Festival in January 2017.

In 2017, Slamdance DIG featured artists from South Africa, Poland, and other countries. Projects included Brief Excursion by Aaron Oldenburg; BVOVB: Bruising Vengeance of the Vintage Boxer by Michal Rostocki; Dujanah by Jack King-Spooner; Everything is Going to Be OK by alienmelon (Nathalie Lawhead); F.L.O.W. (Future Ladies of Wrestling) by Jennifer Juniper Stratford of Telefantasy Studios; Laser Non Laser by Jeanette Bonds of GLAS Animation; Nour by Terrifying Jellyfish (aka TJ Hughes); Semblance by Nyamakop (Cukia Kimani and Ben Myres); Sundays with Absalon by John Vanderhoef; Super Void by Sam Weiss (Shnabubula) and John Donohue Bell (Lazy Brain Games); The Game: The Game by Angela Washko; and ULTRA ADHD (Amazing Death and Huge Destruction) by Alon “DancingEngie” Karmi. DIG opened at Big Pictures Los Angeles on December 1, 2017.

Select projects including The Game: The Game, BVOB: Bruising Vengeance of the Vintage Boxer, and [The (De)escalation Room by Columbia University's Digital Storytelling Lan with Lance Weiler were featured at the 2018 Slamdance Film Festival.

== Slamdance Unstoppable ==
Launched in 2021, Unstoppable is a program dedicated to films created by filmmakers with visible and non-visible disabilities. It was founded by Juliet Romeo, Asha Chai-Chang, Gabriel Cordell, Chris Furbee, Steve Way, Peter Baxter and Taylor Miller. Unstoppable aims to address longstanding barriers to representation within the film industry. Initially launched as a shorts showcase, Unstoppable has expanded to include feature-length films.

Films presented in the Unstoppable category include Bad Survivor (2025), a dark comedy about a sarcastic girl's post-remission reality, and Feeling Through (2020), which follows a late-night encounter between a teen-in-need and a DeafBlind man.

== See also ==
- 2007 Slamdance Film Festival
- 2008 Slamdance Film Festival
- 2010 Slamdance Film Festival
- 2011 Slamdance Film Festival
- 2012 Slamdance Film Festival
