= 2011 Slamdance Film Festival =

American film festival in Utah

- Festival Poster
- Location: Park City, Utah, U.S.
- Awards: Sparky Awards
- No. of films: 83
- Festival date: January 20–27, 2011
- Website: http://www.slamdance.com/

Slamdance Film Festival
- 2012 2010

The 2011 Slamdance Film Festival was a film festival held in Park City, Utah from January 20 to January 27, 2011. It was the 17th iteration of the Slamdance Film Festival, an alternative to the more mainstream Sundance Film Festival.

== Festival ==
This year, Slamdance received over 5,000 submissions and programmed 83 films. It concluded with an Awards Ceremony at Treasure Mountain Inn. The theme of the festival was "All is not lost." For 2011, the festival donated 10% of its ticket proceeds in Park City back to the filmmakers.

The film Pete Smalls is Dead opened the festival. Michael Dunaway of Paste wrote "Rather than bring his new film to the senior festival, former Sundance winner Alexandre Rockwell chose to accept an invitation to open Slamdance this year because he says Slamdance is more fun." Dunaway wrote "most experienced Sundancers get a twinkle in their eye when they tell you about the exquisite little film they discovered either at Slamdance (Sundance's boisterous, irreverent stepsister) or in one of the more experimental categories of Sundance itself." At Slamdance, Paste was looking forward to the films Pete Smalls Is Dead; Drama; Last Fast Ride – The Life, Love and Death of a Punk Goddess; and Superheroes.

The festival had its second annual Filmmaker Summit, with an exclusive video on demand distribution agreement with Microsoft. Speakers included John Anderson of Variety, Scilla Andreen of IndieFlix, Orlando Bagwell of the Ford Foundation, Brian Newman of subgenre media, filmmaker and comic book writer Greg Pak, Amy Powell of Paranormal Activity, Jenny Samppala of Banyan Beach, Tiffany Shlain (director of Connected and Yelp), and Lance Weiler of Pandemic 1.0.

For the entire duration of the festival, select feature films in competition were made available via Zune Marketplace. The films included Modern Imbecile's Planet World, Snow on tha Bluff, The Beast Pageant, the documentaries Road Dogs and Scrapper, and also films from previous festivals.

This year, 17 films were available on video on demand through Xbox Live and Zune, in standard definition or high definition. Revenue was split 50/50 with filmmakers. 12 films from past festivals will be available throughout 2011 including the documentaries Off the Grid, Orwell Rolls in His Grave, Zombie Girl; and the narrative features Omaha: The Movie and We Go Way Back.

People attending the opening night festivities included Tim Roth, Peter Dinklage, Alexandre Rockwell, Lee Tergesen, Simon Arthur, Tommy Davidson, Fred Stoller, Angelo Tsarouchas, Steve Skrovan, Max Carlson, Tom Lenk, Lilly Ayers, Danielle Santos, Eva von Slut, INSAINTS members Daniel Deleon, Gregory Langston and Josh Levine, Michael Barnett, Kevin M. Brennan, Doug Manley, and Jeff Grace, and others.

David Burger of The Salt Lake Tribune wrote that the Slamdance Film Festival "claims it's the more indie-spirited festival — and when it comes to films about music, that boast might be true." He spoke to the filmmakers behind Last Fast Ride — The Life, Love and Death of a Punk Goddess, a documentary directed by Lilly Scourtis Ayers about Marian Anderson of INSAINTS; Pleasant People directed by Dave Bonawits; and Road Dogs, a documentary directed by Shane Aquino that follows the bands HTTH (Heavenly Trip to Hell) and Kettle Cadaver on cross country tours.

In an interview with The Park Record, festival president and co-founder Peter Baxter said attendance had been "excellent" and most of the screenings had sold out.

== Awards ==
This year's festival featured three competitive divisions: Grand Jury, Audience Awards and Special Sponsored Awards provided by Kodak, Panasonic, Dos Equis and Good Health. A new addition to the festival was a theatrical distribution award for best feature, best short film, and selections from Grand Jury and Audience Award films. The films were screened domestically throughout 2011, including at IFC Center in New York and 14 Pews in Houston. Strongman, a previous Slamdance Grand Jury Documentary winner opened in late January at the IFC Center in New York. Awards were sponsored by Adobe, Dos Equis, Kodak, Panasonic, Good Health and Pierce Law Group.

=== Grand Jury Awards ===
- Grand Jury Sparky Award for Best Narrative Film - Stranger Things, written and directed by Eleanor Burke and Ron Eyal
- Special Jury Mention - Joslyn Jensen's performance in Without, written and directed by Mark Jackson
- Grand Jury Sparky Award for Best Documentary Film - Bhopali, directed by Van Maximillian Carlson
- Special Jury Mention - Fordson, directed by Rashid Ghazi
- Grand Jury Sparky Award for Best Animated Short - Bottle, written and directed by Kirsten Lepore
- Grand Jury Sparky Award for Best Narrative Short - Bird, written and directed by Petr Stupin
- Special Jury Mention - Son Of None, written and directed by Todd Looby
- Grand Jury Sparky Award for Best Documentary Short - Oaks, directed by Charles Wittenmeier

=== Audience Awards ===
- Audience Sparky Award for Best Narrative Film - Silver Tongues, written and directed by Simon Arthur
- Audience Sparky Award for Best Documentary Film - Bhopali, directed by Van Maximilian Carlson
- Spirit of Slamdance Sparky Award, sponsored by Good Health - Shunka, directed by CJ Gardella

=== Sponsored Awards ===
- Kodak Vision Award for Best Cinematography - Shunka, directed by CJ Gardella (also received 10,000 feet of Kodak film)
- Panasonic AF100 Award for Best “Road To Park City” Short Film Award - The Road to Park City is Paved with Artists, written and directed by Kevin Brennan and Doug Manley
- Slamdance/Adobe Re-cut Competition Award - Nelson Vunda
- Slamdance Theatrical Release Offer Award, Feature - Superheroes, directed by Michael Barnett; written by Michael Barnett & Theodore James
- Slamdance Theatrical Release Offer Award, Short - Hello Caller, directed by Andrew Putschoegl; written by Tom Lenk

== Films ==
The Feature competitions at Slamdance are limited to first-time filmmakers working with production budgets of $1 million or less.

=== Competition ===
10 narrative films and 8 documentaries were selected to screen in competition. 14 of them are world premieres.

==== Narrative competition ====
Title	Country	Director	Minutes	Premiere	Cast	URL
Atrocious	Mexico, Spain	Fernando Barreda Luna	75	North American Premiere	July Quintanilla, Cristian Quintanilla	
The Beast Pageant	U.S.	Albert Birney & Jon Moses	74	World Premiere	Jon Moses, Ted Greenway, Emily Osinski, S. Michael Smith, Sam Hughes, Jon Eaton, Ron Bauerle, and Tigran Vardanyan	
Beneath Contempt	U.S.	Benjamin Brewer	101	World Premiere	Colin Janson, Melanie May, Eric Eastman, Mike Bash, Abby Austin, Sarah Newhouse	
Drama	Chile	Matias Lira	80	U.S. Premiere	Benjamin Vicnna, Diego Ruiz, Eusebio Arenas, Fernanda Urrejola, Isidora Urrejola	
Fred and Vinnie	U.S.	Steve Skrovan	89	West Coast Premiere	Fred Stoller, Angelo Tsarouches, Scott Chernoff, Bill Rutkoski, John Asher, Harriet Rose, Sarah Rush, Lee Reherman	
Pleasant People	U.S.	David Bonawits	69	World Premiere	Jiyoung Lee, Josh Hall, Dave Marder, Sarah Atchison, Paula Trude	
Silver Tongues	U.S.	Simon Arthur	87	World Premiere	Lee Tergesen, Enid Graham, Tate Ellington, Emily Meade, Harvey Evans, Portia, Rosa Arrendondo, Adam Lefevre	
Snow On Tha Bluff	U.S.	Damon Russell	79	World Premiere	Curtis Snow, Frank Ringer, Curtis Lockett, Adrienne Lockett, D'Angelo Snow, Brandon Snow, Kita Snow	
Stranger Things	U.K., U.S.	Eleanor Burke & Ron Eyal	77	West Coast Premiere	Bridget Collins, Adeel Akhtar	
Without	U.S.	Mark Jackson	88	World Premiere	Joslyn Jensen, Ron Carrier	

==== Documentary competition ====
Title	Country	Director	Minutes	Premiere	URL
Bhopali	India, U.S.	Van Maximilian Carlson	84	World Premiere	
Fordson: Faith, Fasting, Football	U.S.	Rashid Ghazi	93	World Premiere	
Last Fast Ride – The Life, Love and Death of a Punk Goddess	U.S.	Lilly Scourtis Ayers	86	World Premiere	
Road Dogs	U.S.	Shane Aquino	83	World Premiere	
Scrapper	U.S.	Stephan Wassmann	81	World Premiere	
Shunka	U.S.	CJ Gardella	75	U.S. Premiere	
Superheroes	U.S.	Michael Barnett	90	World Premiere	
Zielinski	U.S.	Chase Thompson & Ryan Walker	65	World Premiere	
