= Beeswing =

Beeswing may refer to:

- Potassium bitartrate, a sediment from winemaking, used in cooking as "cream of tartar"
- Beeswing (horse), a 19th-century champion racehorse from Northern England
- "Beeswing", a song on Richard Thompson's 1994 album Mirror Blue, and the name of his own record label
- Beeswing, Dumfries and Galloway, a small village in south-west Scotland
- Beeswing (video game), a semi-autobiographical game about the developer who grew up in the Scottish town
