= List of video games in the Museum of Modern Art =

Thirty-five video games and one game console have been acquired by the Museum of Modern Art (MoMA), located in New York City, as part of its permanent collection. Acquisitions of these titles began in 2012, with games being selected for the interaction design elements within them. The Museum of Modern Art's video game collection was first showcased in the 2013–2014 exhibition Applied Design in the Philip Johnson Architecture and Design Galleries, curated by Paola Antonelli. Since then, video games have been featured in several of MoMA's design exhibitions.

== Background ==
In 2006, the Museum of Modern Art began a movement to include forms of contemporary design beyond traditional media, starting with acquiring digital fonts and later moving on to video games. While institutions such as the Smithsonian American Art Museum have displayed video games in exhibitions, the MoMA was one of the first art museums to acquire them for its own permanent collection, a process which requires obtaining the legal rights to indefinitely emulate and exhibit the games from their developers and publishers. Prior to the start of MoMA's video game collection, the MoMA also had exhibited a limited number of video games in its design galleries; some of these titles would go on to be acquired by the museum, namely Dwarf Fortress, Passage, and Katamari Damacy.

The MoMA initially set criteria for video games to determine their eligibility for being added to their permanent collection, primarily considering four central interaction design traits: behavior, aesthetics, space, and time. An additional significant requirement was "no gratuitous violence", resulting in the exclusion of popular or landmark video games such as the Grand Theft Auto and Red Dead series. Though the MoMA is interested in acquiring a game's hardware and interface, the proprietary source code is considered the most valued. According to Antonelli, "when we cannot acquire the code, we acquire simulations, emulations, the cartridge, the hardware. But what we're interested in showing is the interaction by itself." As a result, notable missing titles from MoMA's collection include unemulatable video games on obsolete hardware such as Spacewar!, abandonware with missing source code or unknown legal rights such as Zork, and games from developers the MoMA has been unable to reach an agreement with such as Nintendo's Donkey Kong and Super Mario Bros.

== History ==
The Museum of Modern Art acquired what could be considered its first video game on October 8, 2008: Feng Mengbo's Long March: Restart (2008), an homage to side-scrolling video games from the 1980s which depicts the Long March during the Chinese Civil War. In exhibitions, the interactive installation is displayed on a digital wall spanning 80 feet long and uses a wireless game controller for visitors to play. However, Long March: Restart was created as an art exhibition piece, unlike the titles in MoMA's video game collection.

In November 2012, the MoMA announced the acquisitions of their first fourteen video game titles, with plans to expand the collection to up to forty games over time. The announcement stirred up controversy, as some critics argued video games are not considered art and therefore might not have a place in an art gallery. The initial line-up of video games was featured in the 2013–2014 exhibition Applied Design.

Pac-Man is placed near the elevator exit, as it was assumed to be one of the most popular games on display.

The exhibit, curated by Paola Antonelli, is modeled after Philip Johnson’s 1934 exhibition Machine Art, in which pieces of machinery such as propeller blades were displayed in a minimalist fashion to lay focus on their mechanical design. This set-up would create a "strange distance, this shock, that made people realize how gorgeous formally, and also important functionally, design pieces were," which, according to Antonelli, is the desired effect of the exhibition. In order to minimize factors such as nostalgia, video games were displayed in a minimalist fashion where only a screen and controlling-device were visible on an otherwise blank wall. The MoMA also took cautious care of traffic flow within the exhibit, placing games that were likely to be heavily played (such as Pac-Man) near entrances and exits. In addition, games that would require a larger amount of time to play either had a shortened demo version developed for them or were displayed via screenshots or video montages. The principles of this exhibition set-up would be used in future MoMA exhibitions featuring video games.

The acquisition of six more video games, as well as a video game console, was announced in June 2013. These additions leaned heavily towards the classic era of arcade machines and 8-bit consoles, during which developers pioneered design principles that built the foundation of modern video games. According to MoMA collection specialist Paul Galloway, many early, "seemingly simple games remain as vital and compelling today as they were" during the 1970s and 80s. Ralph H. Baer's Magnavox Odyssey console was added due to its role as the first commercial home video game console as well as being considered both "a masterpiece of engineering and industrial design".

Three additional titles were added to MoMA's collection in the following years, including Biophilia, the MoMA's first acquired mobile app. Furthermore, video games were featured in two more of MoMA's exhibitions: A Collection of Ideas (2014–2015) and This Is for Everyone (2015–2016).

In 2021, an additional twelve video games were acquired, primarily consisting of recent indie games created by individuals or small development teams. The entirety of MoMA's video game collection was included in the 2022–2023 exhibition Never Alone, which also marked ten years since the MoMA began acquiring video games.

== Collection ==
Collection
Date acquired	Title	Developer	Platform	Year	Notes	Ref.
June 7, 2012	Another World	Delphine Software International	Various	1991		
June 7, 2012	Eve Online	CCP Games	PC	2003	The massively multiplayer online video game is installed as a "day in the universe" of the game. Additionally, MoMA offers data of the virtual economy that has developed within Eve Online since its release in 2003 via a video presentation.	
June 7, 2012	Portal	Valve	Various	2007		
June 7, 2012	SimCity 2000	Maxis	Various	1993	Due to the game's complexity, a visual demo is prepared, and screenshots of the game are displayed on a floor-to-ceiling, multi-column mural.	
June 7, 2012	The Sims	Maxis	Various	2000	Available only as a video demonstration	
June 7, 2012	Tetris	Alexey Pajitnov	Various	1984	MoMA's copy of Tetris runs on an Apple computer mimicking the specific Soviet-era computer it was designed for in 1985.	
June 7, 2012	Vib-Ribbon	NanaOn-Sha	PlayStation	1999		
October 15, 2012	Canabalt	Adam Saltsman	Mobile	2009		
October 15, 2012	Dwarf Fortress	Tarn Adams	PC	2006	Originally part of MoMA's Talk to Me: Design and the Communication between People and Objects exhibit (July 29, 2011–November 7, 2011). Each time a new version of Dwarf Fortress is made available, MoMA instantly downloads and archives the version in its secure servers. The complex game is available to visitors as a "cinematic trailer".	
October 15, 2012	Flow	Thatgamecompany	PlayStation 3	2007		
October 15, 2012	Katamari Damacy	Namco	PlayStation 2	2004	Originally part of MoMA's Century of the Child: Growing by Design, 1900–2000 exhibit (July 29–November 5, 2012).	
October 15, 2012	Myst	Cyan Worlds	Various	1993	Available only as a video demonstration	
October 15, 2012	Pac-Man	Namco	Arcade	1980		
November 29, 2012 (Note: Exact date acquired is unknown)	Passage	Jason Rohrer	PC	2007	Originally part of MoMA's Talk to Me: Design and the Communication between People and Objects exhibit (July 29–November 7, 2011).	
June 3, 2013	Asteroids	Atari	Arcade	1979		
June 3, 2013	Magnavox Odyssey	Ralph Baer	—N/a	1972	First generation home video game console	
June 3, 2013	Minecraft	Mojang Studios	PC	2011		
June 3, 2013	Pong	Atari	Arcade	1972		
June 3, 2013	Space Invaders	Taito	Arcade	1978		
June 3, 2013	Tempest	Atari	Arcade	1981		
June 3, 2013	Yars' Revenge	Atari	Atari 2600	1982		
November 11, 2013	Street Fighter II	Capcom	Arcade	1991	MoMA's copy of Street Fighter II is Hyper Street Fighter II (2003).	
May 19, 2014	Biophilia	Second Wind Ltd Apps, RelativeWave	Mobile	2011	MoMA's first acquired mobile app	
October 19, 2015	Snake	Nokia	Various	1997		
April 26, 2021	Everything is Going to Be OK	Nathalie Lawhead	PC	2017		
April 26, 2021	Flower	Thatgamecompany	PlayStation 3	2009		
April 26, 2021	Getting Over It with Bennett Foddy	Bennett Foddy	PC	2017		
April 26, 2021	Inside	Playdead	Various	2016		
April 26, 2021	Journey	Thatgamecompany	PlayStation 3	2012		
April 26, 2021	Monument Valley	Ustwo	Mobile	2014		
April 26, 2021	NetHack	The Nethack DevTeam	PC	1987		
April 26, 2021	Never Alone	E-Line Media	Various	2014		
April 26, 2021	Papers, Please	Lucas Pope	PC	2013		
April 26, 2021	Return of the Obra Dinn	Lucas Pope	PC	2018		
April 26, 2021	The Stanley Parable	Davey Wreden	PC	2011		
April 26, 2021	This War of Mine	11 Bit Studios	PC	2014		

== Exhibitions ==
- Applied Design (March 2, 2013 to January 20, 2014)
- A Collection of Ideas (February 15, 2014 to January 11, 2015)
- This Is for Everyone: Design Experiments for the Common Good (February 14, 2015 to January 18, 2016)
- Never Alone: Video Games and Other Interactive Design (September 10, 2022 to July 16, 2023)

== See also ==
- List of works in the Museum of Modern Art
- List of video games listed among the best
- Video games as an art form
