= San Diego Underground Film Festival =

Underground arts organization

- Location: San Diego, California, U.S.
- Established: 2015
- Founded by: Ryan Betschart; Tyler Betschart; Rachel Nakawatase

San Diego Underground Film Festival (SDUFF) is an annual film festival hosted in San Diego and Los Angeles, California that showcases short and feature length films from all over the world. Their programing highlights films by independent and experimental filmmakers and artists working on single-channel film & video as well as installation, performance, and expanded cinema.

== History ==
The festival debuted in 2015 at UltraStar Mission Valley Cinemas. In 2016 and 2019, the Tenth Avenue Theatre and Arts Center hosted the event. Ryan and Tyler Betschart created the festival with Rachael Nakawatase. In 2017, Kristin Reeves had nine 16 mm projectors that she towed to the festival and Michael Morris' expanded cinema performances were well received.

In 2019, the festival was named one of the Top 50 Film Festivals Worth the Entry Fee by MovieMaker. In 2023, the venue was scheduled for Digital Gym Cinema.

=== Notable films ===
- Dead Hands Dig Deep

=== Notable attendees ===
- Rikk Agnew
- Gitane DeMone
