= Passage (video game) =

2007 video game

- A screenshot from the game
- Designer: Jason Rohrer
- Platforms: Windows; Mac OS; Linux; Nintendo DSi
- Release: November 1, 2007
- Genre: Art game
- Mode: Single-player

Passage is a 2007 experimental video game developed by Jason Rohrer. Since its release it has become a significant entry in the burgeoning debate of video games as an art form. Rohrer himself has been an outspoken proponent of advancing the artistic integrity of the medium.

In the game, the player spends five minutes experiencing a character's entire lifetime, with results that many commentators have described as emotionally powerful.

Rohrer has described the title as a "memento mori" game.

== Gameplay ==
In form, Passage most resembles a primitive side-scroller in which players control a male avatar that can move from left to right as time progresses. There are no instructions. The environment is a two-dimensional maze with treasure chests scattered throughout, some in relatively hard to reach places. Points are earned for collecting these chests. After a short time, the player will encounter a female character who will marry the protagonist if touched; this choice, however, will increase the difficulty of navigating the maze, as the female will begin to accompany the player and restrict certain avenues of movement.

In the beginning of the game the player is positioned near the left side of the screen, thereby limiting his ability to see backward (the environment to the left of the player), with a long and narrow expanse of environment available to the right. As the game progresses, the avatar's relative position on the screen gradually shifts to the right, with less visibility to the right and more visibility to the left. The speed of the player also slows as time progresses, and the representation of both the avatar and the wife visibly age.

The lack of any victory conditions coupled with the inevitability of death have led some to question whether Passage is in fact a game at all, or whether the word "game" is a sufficient label for it.

== Plot ==
The game is devoid of a traditional plot, instead allowing the player's choices to author an abstract representation of a life. The protagonist may choose to maximize his life as a treasure hunter by remaining alone, or choose to marry for companionship, which will last until his wife's eventual death. Regardless of the choices the player makes, the fixed length of the game and the aging of the protagonist ensures death for the player character as well.

== Themes ==
Passage was intended as an abstract metaphor for the human condition. Rohrer has stated that repeated playthroughs help emphasize the finite nature of the experience.

== Development ==
Passage was made for Kokoromi's Gamma 256 event, a curated show at the 2007 Montreal International Games Summit. The size constraints for Gamma 256 led Rohrer to present the game in a blocky 100x16 pixel resolution. No entrants were allowed to exceed 256x256. Games were also limited to five minutes in length. Rohrer created all of the content, including the music, and the pixel art, which was made using the free software mtPaint. The final game was 2 megabytes large.

The visual presentation of the main character is loosely based on Rohrer himself, with the female character modeled on his wife Lauren.

Rohrer has stated that the themes of Passage were influenced by the death of an elderly neighbor, as well as his own changing life circumstances after starting a family of his own.

In 2007 Rohrer released the game's source code and assets into the public domain, while asking for voluntary donations (Donationware) and selling the game on the iOS appstore for $0.99.

== Reception ==
Passage is frequently cited as a landmark title in the debate over video games as an art form. Its focus on mortality and the human condition has been praised by critics for its emotional weight.

At the 2007 Montreal International Games Summit, Passage was one of eight submitted entrants that were screened at Kokoromi's Gamma 256 show, a competition that asked designers to create a game in 70 days that used as low a resolution and as unusual an aspect ratio as possible.

In 2010, Marcus Richter released Passage in 10 Seconds, a satirical Flash game that condenses the original's mechanics into a few seconds. Game theorist Jesper Juul noted that the parody serves as a commentary on the audience's role in defining art, mocking the "extreme enthusiasm" the original game received.

In 2012, curator Paola Antonelli of New York's Museum of Modern Art selected Passage as one of the first 14 video games to be added to its permanent collection. In March 2013 the exhibition opened in the Philip Johnson Galleries.
