= 2012 Slamdance Film Festival =

The 2012 Slamdance Film Festival was a film festival held in Park City, Utah from January 20 to January 26, 2012. It was the 18th iteration of the Slamdance Film Festival, a complementary fest to the Sundance Film Festival.

== Festival ==
With nearly 5,000 submissions, 18 feature-length films were shown along with 75 short films and 8 special screenings selected from across the globe. The festival took place at the Treasure Mountain Inn on Main Street in Park City. Festival alumni include acclaimed directors, such as Christopher Nolan ("The Dark Knight'), Seth Gordon ("Horrible Bosses") and Oren Peli ("Paranormal Activity").

Festivities included the Opening and Closing Night Parties at the Carhartt Lounge, panel discussions, daily happy hours and the annual Sled Off. The festival also featured Morning Coffee Master Classes with Neil Young, Jonathan Demme and Stan Lee. Demme and Young shared their stories about making the documentary Neil Young Journeys. Young also confirmed that he is working with longtime collaborator Crazy Horse on a new album. Stan Lee and director Will Hess discussed the making of their new doc With Great Power: The Stan Lee Story.

Special screenings, included Wild In The Streets, No Room For Rockstars, Neil Young Journeys and Ed Wood's Lost Film Final Curtain.

== Films ==
The feature competitions at Slamdance are limited to first-time filmmakers working with production budgets of $1 million or less. The festival showcased 10 Narrative Films and 8 Documentary Films, including 13 World Premieres.

=== Narrative competition ===
Title	Country	Director	Premiere
Bindlestiffs	USA	Andrew Edison	World Premiere
Comforting Skin	Canada	Derek Franson	US Premiere
Doppelgänger Paul (or A Film About How Much I Hate Myself)	Canada	Dylan Akio Smith, Kris Elgstrand	US Premiere
Faith, Love and Whiskey	Bulgaria	Kristina Nikolova	World Premiere
Heavy Girls	Germany	Axel Ranisch	US Premiere
OK, Good	USA	Daniel Martinico	World Premiere
Roller Town	Canada	Andrew Bush	US Premiere
The Sound of Small Things	USA	Peter McLarnan	World Premiere
Sundowning	Singapore/USA	Frank Rinaldi	World Premiere
Welcome to Pine Hill	USA	Keith Miller	World Premiere

=== Documentary competition ===
Title	Country	Director	Premiere
Buffalo Girls	Thailand/USA	Todd Kellstein	World Premiere
Danland	USA	Alexandra Berger	World Premiere
The First Season	USA	Rudd Simmons	World Premiere
Getting Up	USA	Caskey Ebeling	World Premiere
I Want My Name Back	USA	Roger Paradiso	Utah Premiere
Kelly	USA	James Stenson	World Premiere
No Ashes, No Phoenix	Germany	Jens Pfeifer	World Premiere
We Are Legion: The Story of the Hacktivists	USA	Brian Knappenberger	World Premiere

== Awards ==
Slamdance co-founder and president Peter Baxter is quoted as saying, “This year's narrative and documentary competitions are stronger than ever, and these filmmakers represent the vanguard of true independent filmmaking.” The following films were honored with prizes from the Grand Jury, audience members and festival sponsors.

=== Grand Jury Awards ===
- Grand Jury Sparky Award for Best Narrative Film - Welcome to Pine Hill by Keith Miller
- Special Jury Award for Bold Originality - Heavy Girls by Axel Ranisch
- Grand Jury Sparky Award for Feature Documentary - No Ashes, No Phoenix by Jens Pfeifer
- Grand Jury Award for Short Documentary - The Professional by Skylar Neilsen
- Grand Jury Sparky Award for Animation - Venus by Tor Fruergaard
- Grand Jury Sparky Award for Short Film - I am John Wayne by Christina Choe
- Special Jury Prize for Experimental Short - Solipsist by Andrew Huang
- Honorable Mention for Best Ensemble - I'm Coming Over by Sam Handel

=== Audience Awards ===
- Audience Award for Feature Documentary - Getting Up by Caskey Ebeling
- Audience Award for Feature Narratives - BINDLESTIFFS by Andrew Edison

=== Sponsored Awards ===
- Spirit of Slamdance Sparky Award - Heavy Girls by Axel Ranisch
- The Kodak Vision Award for Best Cinematography - Faith, Love and Whiskey by Kristina Nikolova
- Panasonic AF100 Award for 'The Five Flavors of Filmmaking' Competition - Josh Gibson, director of the short film Kudzu Vine
