= Beeswing (video game) =

2014 video game

- Developer: Jack King-Spooner
- Platform: Windows
- Release: December 9, 2014
- Genres: Adventure, RPG
- Mode: Single-player

Beeswing is a semi-autobiographical adventure and role-playing video game developed and published by Scottish developer Jack King-Spooner. It was released on December 9, 2014. The game was released following a successful Kickstarter, and is now playable inside of a browser. Inspired by Spooner's childhood in Beeswing, Dumfries and Galloway, Beeswing tells the story of the King-Spooner returning home and meeting the town's inhabitants while reminiscing on their childhood.

Reception to Beeswing was mostly positive, with praise being focused on its unique, nostalgic, and contemplative atmosphere, while criticism focused on its occasional on-the-nose theming.

== Gameplay ==
The main character, King-Spooner, walks towards a lake that he frequented when he was younger. The game's watercolor art style was positively remarked on by critics.

In Beeswing, the player controls a version of Jack King-Spooner, the developer, visiting his hometown later in life. King-Spooner visits people from around his town, including his mom and his neighbors, and he reminisces on the objects and places of his own life in an autobiographical manner. The player solves quests for residents which reveal their personality, and ruminates on the memories of their childhood in the setting. The game features no fighting or puzzles. Some vignettes include conversations with King-Spooner's now deceased neighbor who treated him kindly as a child, and the death of his grandmother.

== Development ==
Developer Jack King-Spooner, after developing a number of freeware games, decided to take on a larger project. King-Spooner created a successful Kickstarter, which he attributed to his successful body of already existing prior work. His games had always had a similar theme, which was around the death of loved ones. King-Spooner wanted players to fully understand the "place" of Beeswing, by focusing on death, change, and attachment.

The game features handmade watercolor art, and was inspired by The Legend of Zelda, Secret of Mana, EarthBound, and To the Moon, among others. King-Spooner felt that the watercolor art of Beeswing suited the washed out surroundings of Beeswing. Although the game shares features with an autobiographical documentary, King-Spooner wanted the game to work on its own as a piece of entertainment. King-Spooner chose to include no fighting or puzzles in the game because they would feel odd in the setting; the soundtrack was created by King-Spooner himself.

Spooner noted that the game is "a story about the past, about community and childhood, attachment and growing up. Scottish folk tales, morally dubious parables, cloudy anecdotes and more contemporary stories of homelessness and immigration all combine to create a truly dynamic narrative." According to King-Spooner, the people of the town of Beeswing, where the developer grew up, knew about the game and were supportive of King-Spooner's efforts in making it. King-Spooner created another game a couple of years later, called Dujanah, in which the main character was developed with a determination to be different from Beeswing's.

== Reception ==
Beeswing received generally positive notes from critics, who praised its autobiographical and contemplative setting. Slant Magazine listed Beeswing as the 88th best game of the 2010s, and compared the game favorably to the Italian film Amarcord for its "journey in which memory and art express the real and the artificial as complementary forces." Kotaku's Heather Alexandra praised the personal stories that the inhabitants of the town told and the game's nostalgic and familiar feel that pervades throughout the experience. Slant Magazine also praised the game's soundtrack for its ability to express vulnerability, a sentiment that was shared by Alexandra. The Arts Desk's Helen Parker called the artistry of the game "wonderful." Kill Screen's David Chandler had a more mixed review of Beeswing, feeling that the game was as equally frustrating as it was enchanting because of its too on-the-nose exploration of its themes.
