= Mackerelmedia Fish =

2020 video game

Mackerelmedia Fish is a 2020 experimental ARG-like browser-based video game developed by Nathalie Lawhead. The game explores themes and settings related to 1990s and early 2000s Internet culture (its name being a parody of Macromedia Flash), especially the loss of digital history through deprecations and data decay. Some of the game is directly implemented on a website's open .htaccess directories, while other portions of it take the user through other previous art projects by Lawhead, such as an application titled Electric Zine Maker.

== Development ==
According to the developer's blog, much of the game was built with Tumult Hype, an HTML5 development application. Lawhead mentioned wanting to have some sort of fictional context for Electric Zine Maker, and created Mackerelmedia Fish as a tie-in to that project as well as future ones. They also mentioned wanting to create an interactive project that made use of open directories for a long time. The project's code has been released on GitHub.

== Reception ==
The game was named one of the Games of the Month of April 2020 by itch.io staff writers, who called it the "perfect entry point for alternate reality games". Writing for Rock, Paper, Shotgun, Lauren Morton praised the game for its 'clever oddity', calling it a "portal back to my childhood when the internet was, if not weirder than now, differently weird". Writing for The Verge, Adi Robertson referred to it as "a strangely adorable ode to dying websites". PC Gamer and The Verge both compared the game favourably to Hypnospace Outlaw.
