= Chocolate Mountain Aerial Gunnery Range =

United States military bombing range in California

- Part of Bob Stump Training Range Complex
- Imperial County and Riverside County, California in the United States
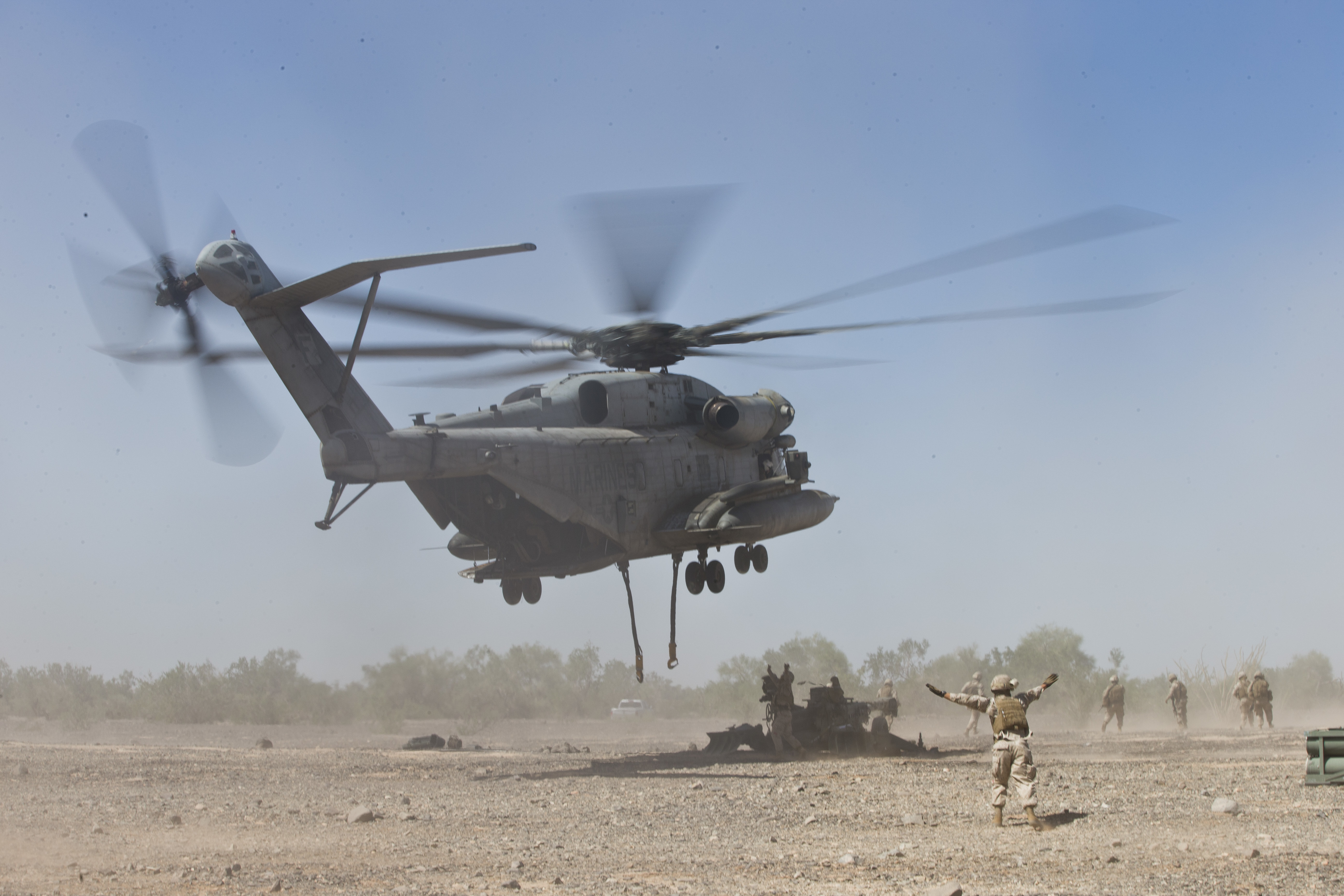
- A CH-53E Super Stallion of the US Marine Corps prepares to lift a M777 Howitzer at Chocolate Mountain Aerial Gunnery Range during 2014

Site information
- Type: Bombing range
- Owner: Department of Defense
- Operator: US Marine Corps
- Controlled by: Marine Corps Air Station Yuma
- Condition: Operational

Location
- Location in the United States CMAGR (California)
- Coordinates: 33°18′0″N 115°18′0″W
- Area: 459,000 acres (186,000 hectares)

Site history
- In use: 1940s – present

Garrison information
- Designations: Chuckwalla Desert Wildlife Management Area

The Chocolate Mountain Aerial Gunnery Range (CMAGR) is a bombing range operated by the United States Marine Corps, located in Southern California.

== Range description ==
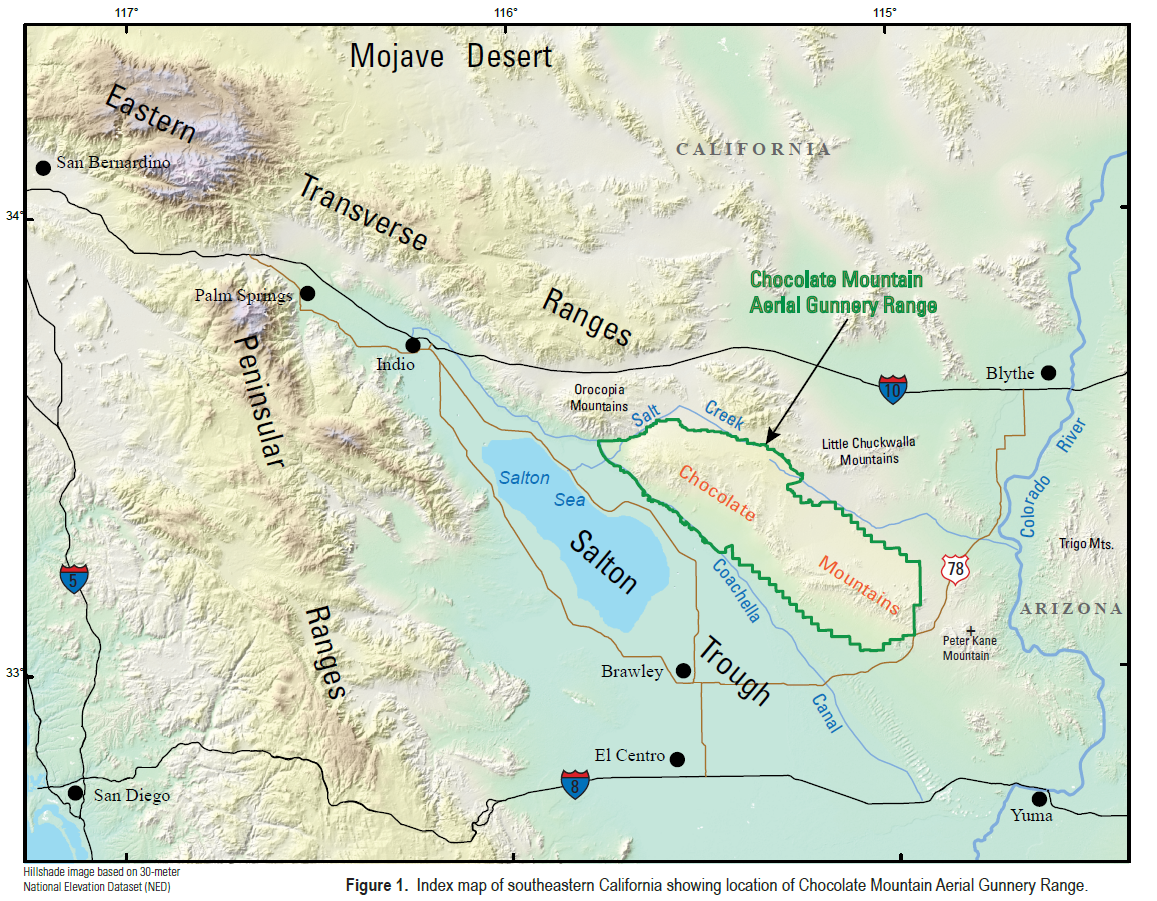
Map of the Chocolate Mountain Aerial Gunnery Range

The range is a 459,000 acres (1,860 km^{2}) open-area, approximately 20 miles wide, east to west, and 50 miles long, northwest to southeast, with a special-use airspace of 700 square miles (1,800 km^{2}) which is used for aerial bombing and live fire aerial gunnery practice. It straddles the northern portion of the Chocolate Mountains to the east of the Salton Sea in Imperial and Riverside counties, California, with restricted airspace in both California and Arizona. It is under the jurisdiction of the United States Navy and United States Marine Corps, and is closed to the public.

== Range operations ==
The United States Department of Defense aviation combat crews have trained at the CMAGR and within its airspace since World War II. The range is managed by Marine Corps Air Station Yuma. The CMAGR range area was permanently transferred to the Department of the Navy in 2014 to be used as a military range. The CMAGR provides opportunities for military training by use of its varied terrain and special-use airspace. The CMAGR is the centerpiece of the Bob Stump Training Range Complex and can support multiple training operations concurrently. The CMAGR's live-fire aviation training ranges provide training for air combat maneuvering and tactics; air-to-air gunnery; airborne laser system operations; close air support; and air-to-ground bombing, strafing, and rocketry. The CMAGR also supports ground training to include air defense, air control, communications, demolition operations, as well as the support of small arms and artillery. The Naval Special Warfare Command also use a portion of the CMAGR for desert warfare training.

The Bradshaw Trail, an old stage road and now a four wheel drive vehicle road, traverses the north boundary of the Gunnery Range between the Chocolate Mountains and the Orocopia Mountains and Chuckwalla Mountains to the north.

The Navy and Marine Corps jointly prepared and published a "Geologic Map and Database of the Chocolate Mountain Aerial Gunnery Range" in 2018.

== Gallery ==
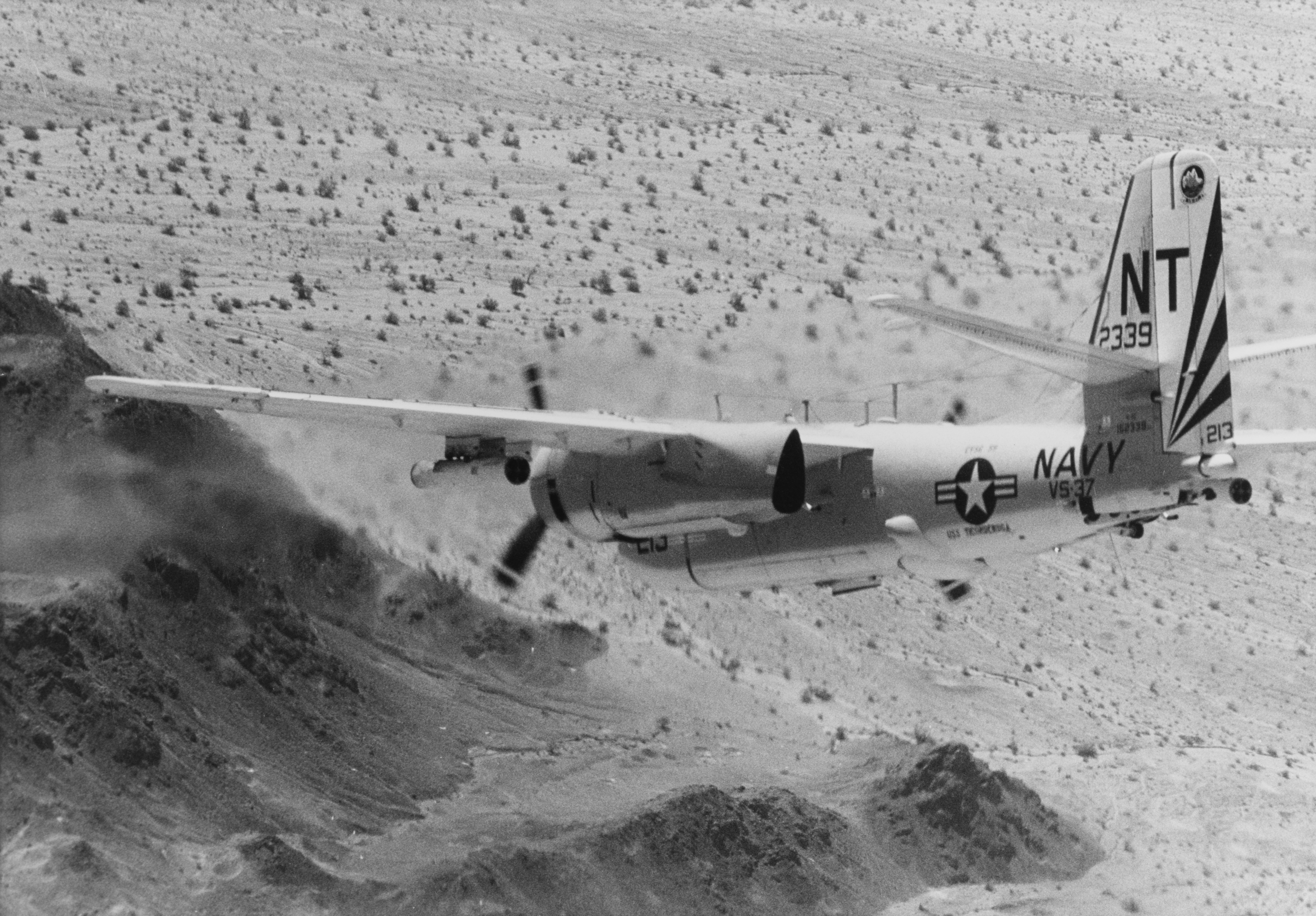
U.S. Navy S-2E Tracker from Anti-Submarine Squadron 37 carrying a four-rocket pod of Zuni 127 mm Folding-Fin Aircraft Rockets below its port wing (1970)

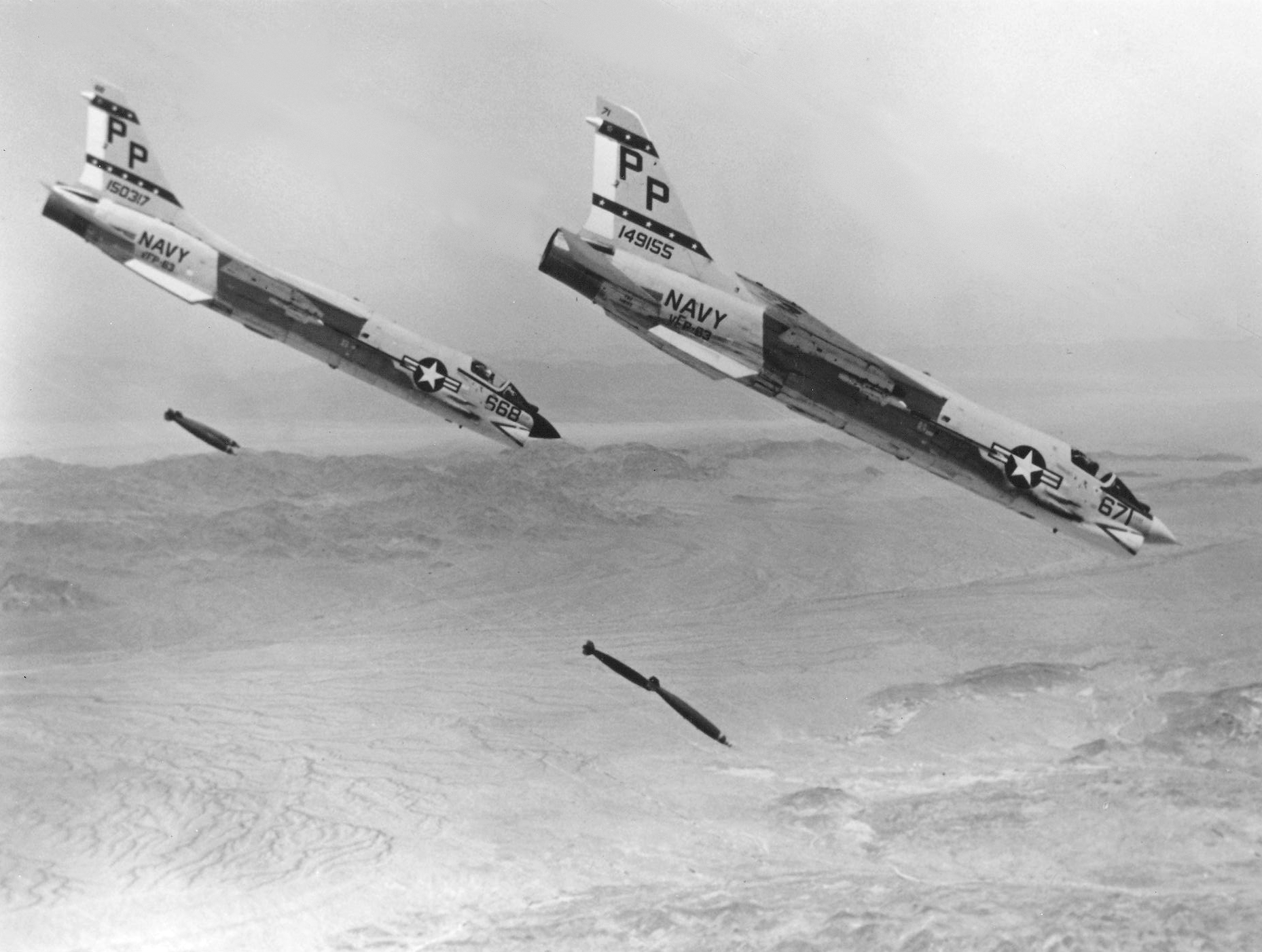
U.S. Navy F-8J Crusaders drop bombs (1972).

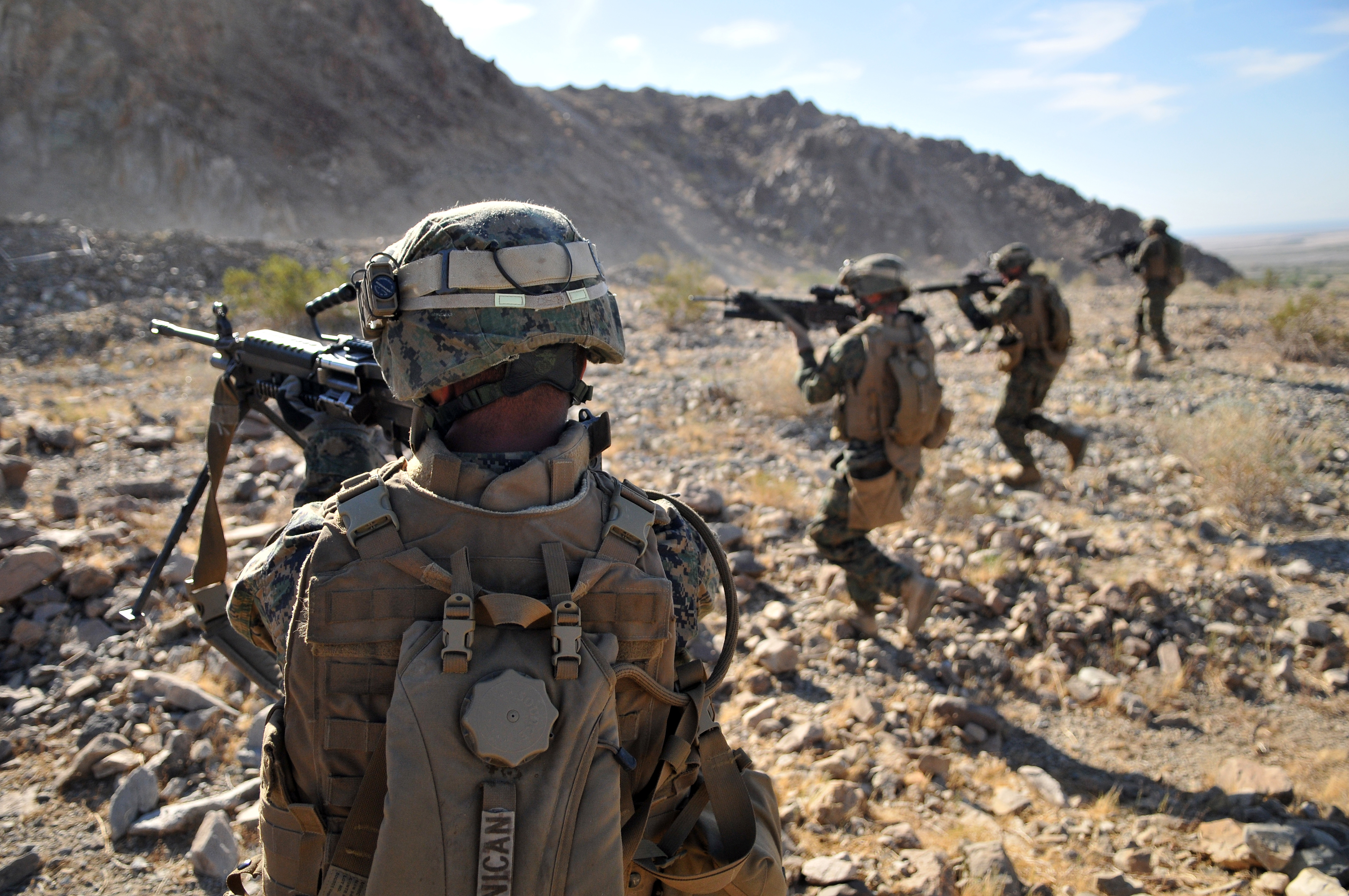
A fire team from the 2nd Marine Regiment advances toward their downed targets, wrapping up a live-fire ambush and reaction drill at Camp Billy Machen Desert Warfare Training Facility (2009).

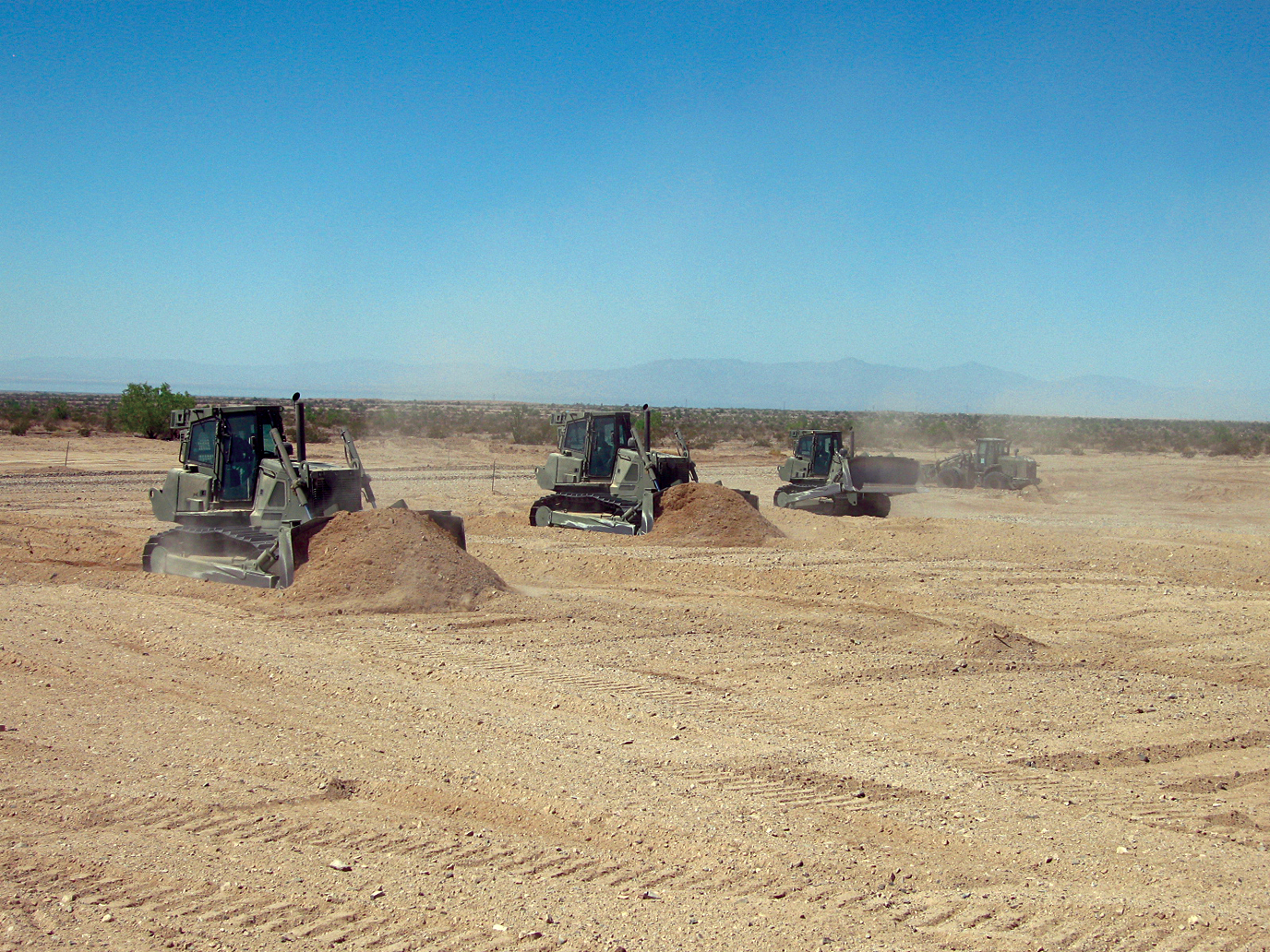
Marine Wing Support Squadron 374 heavy equipment operators remove dirt from and level an unmanned aircraft system runway (2009).

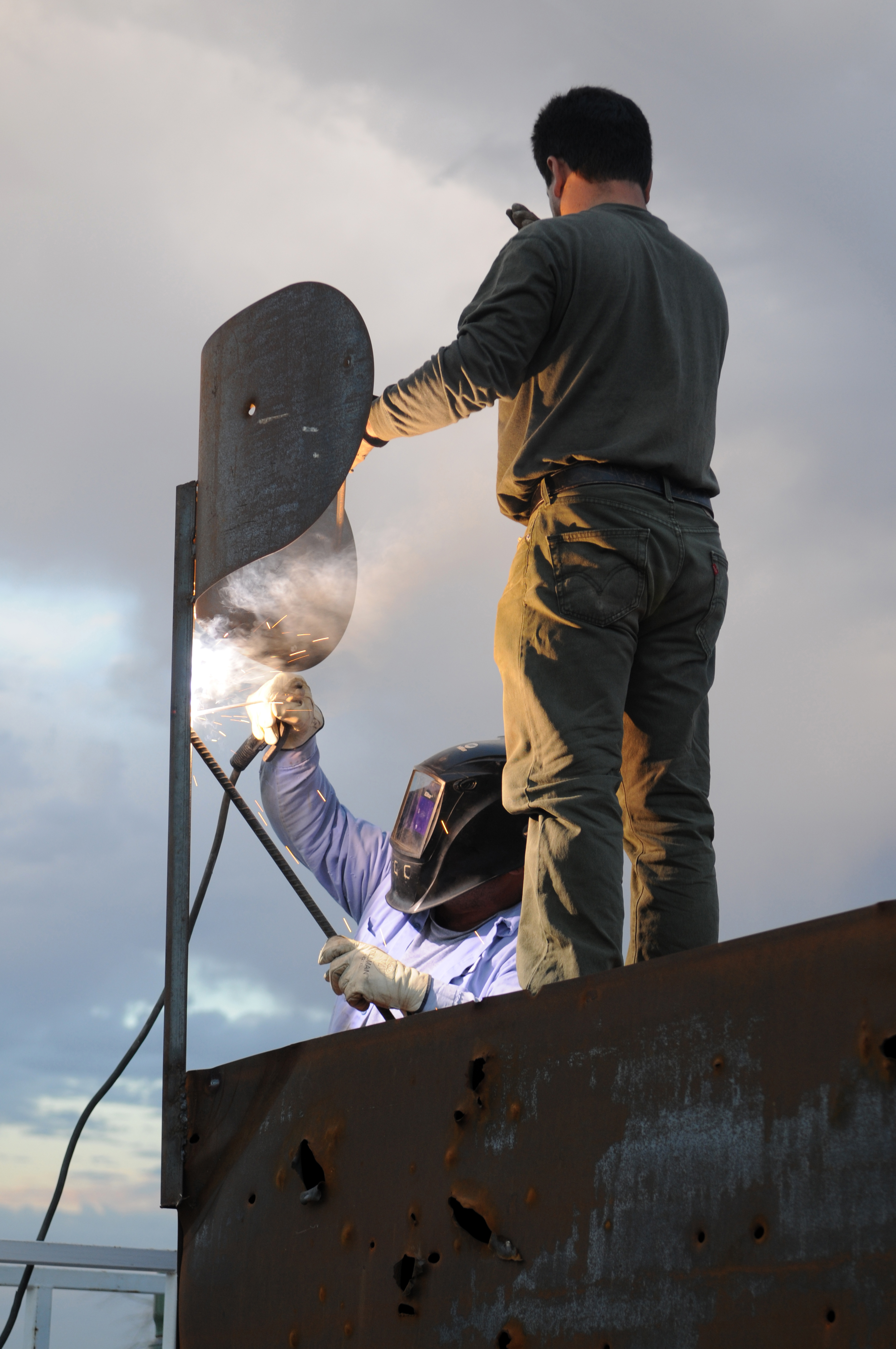
Test services maintenance crewmen weld the support brace of a fake radar dish on the top of a target shaped like a radar van (2010).

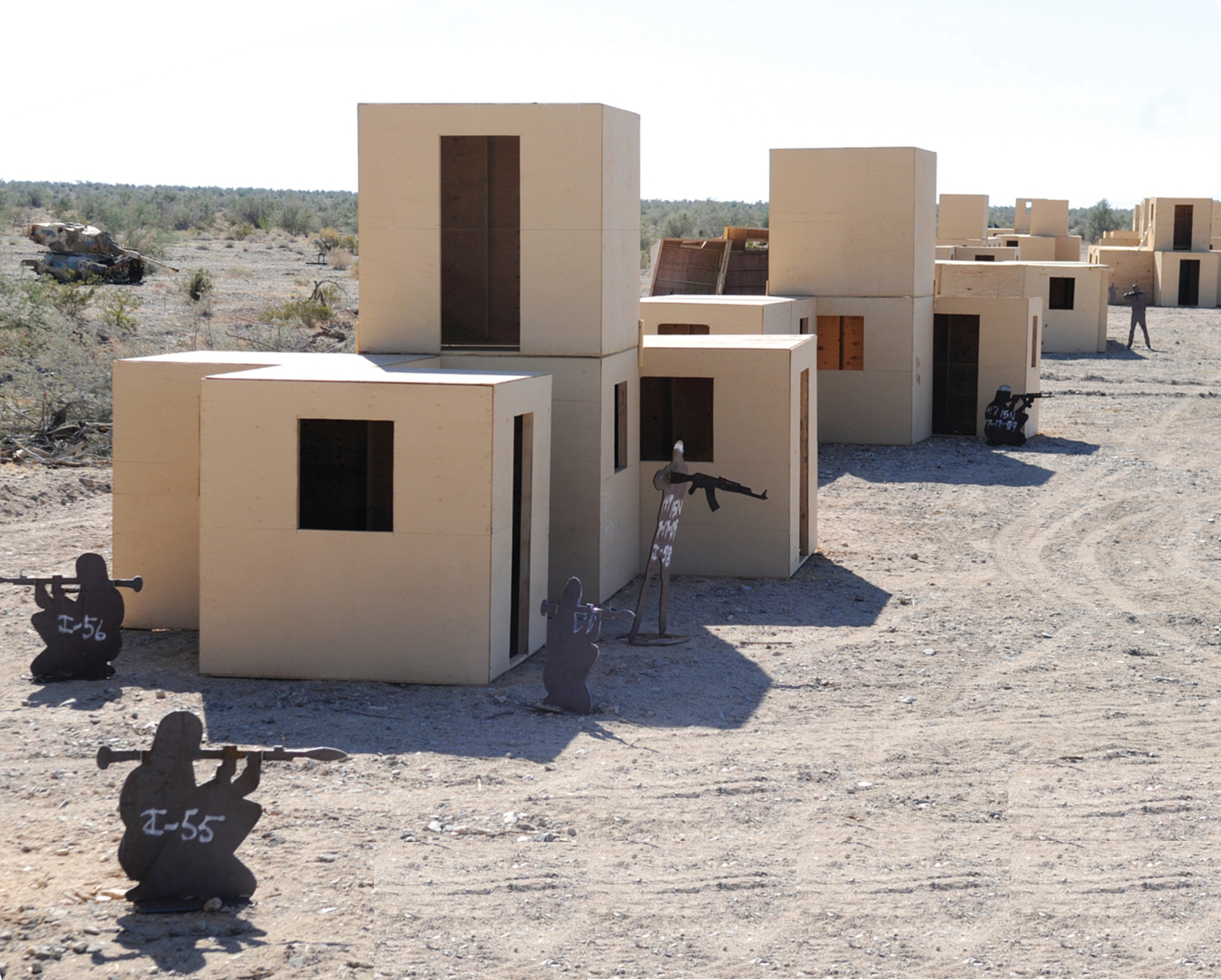
Steel targets simulating Afghan insurgents stand at the Al Brutus training complex within target area 15 North (2011).

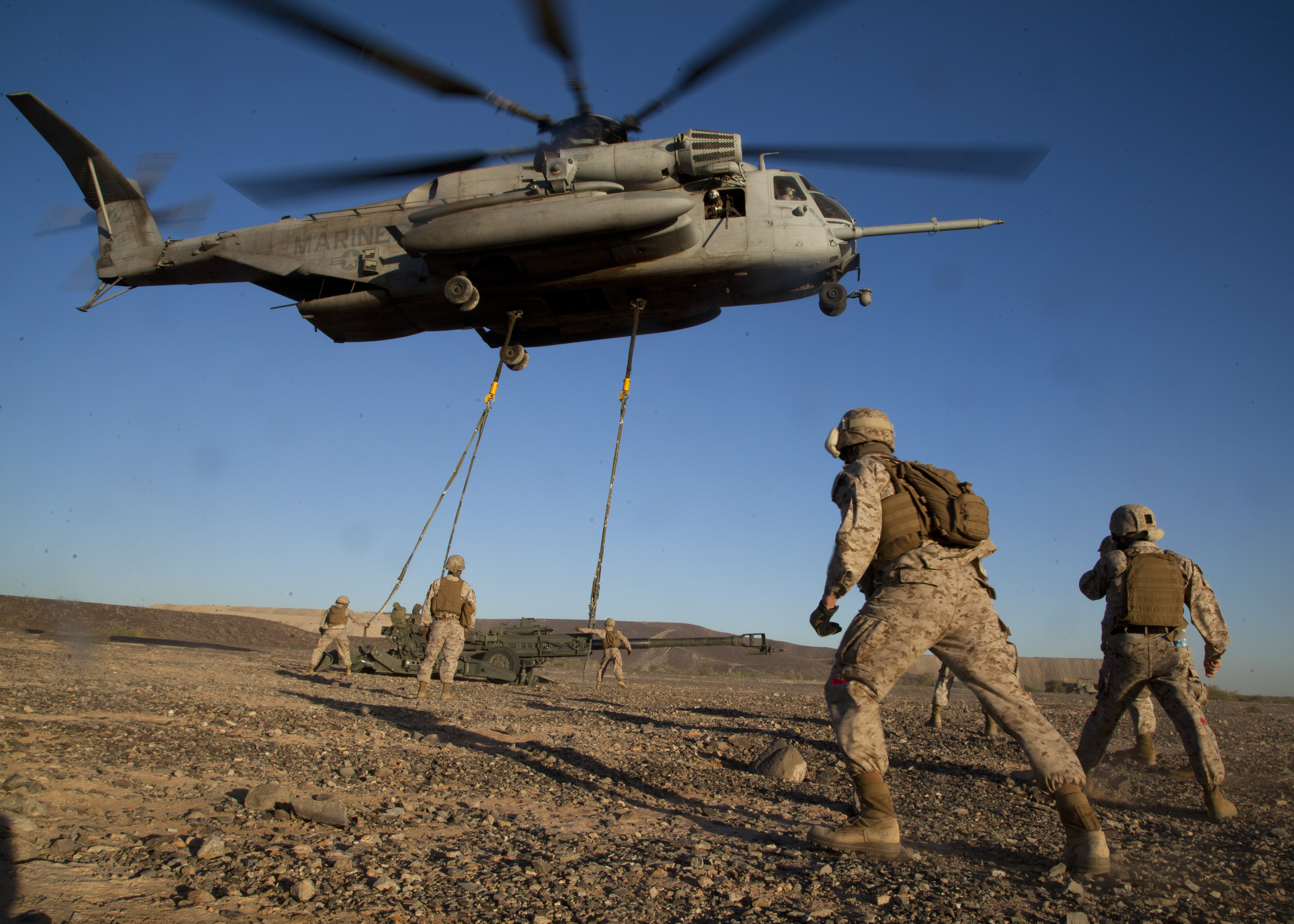
Marines supporting Weapons and Tactics Instructors (WTI) Course 1-14, participate in a CH-53E Super Stallion sling loading exercise at Landing Zone Bull (2013).

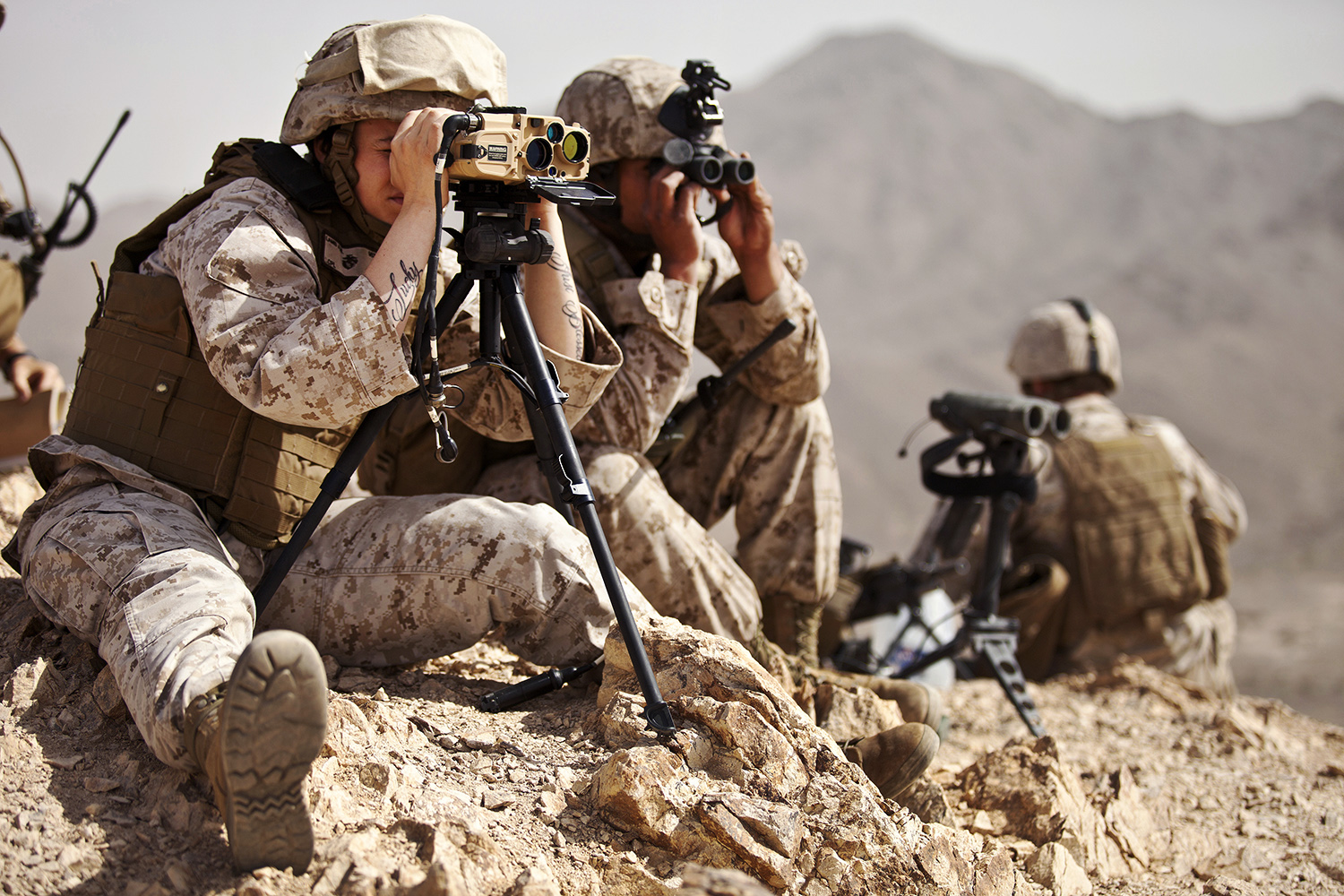
A field radio operator with 9th Communications Battalion, participating in WTI 2-13, uses a laser target designator (2013).

Marines practicing air assault support tactics (2019)

== See also ==
- Slab City
- Stephan Wassmann's 2011 documentary film Scrapper, about people who sneak into the Chocolate Mountain Aerial Gunnery Range to gather nonferrous metal.
