= Damon Russell =

American film director

Damon Russell is a producer and director of television series and films. On June 29, 2016, Russell was inducted as a new member of the Academy of Motion Picture Arts and Sciences.

== Filmography ==
- In 2005 Russell produced two episodes of Made, a series on MTV.
- In 2007 Russell produced three episodes of Flip This House, an A&E reality series.
- In 2007–2009, he produced 3 episodes of The First 48, a crime documentary series on A&E.
- Russell directed the 2011 film Snow on tha Bluff, a crime drama in reality style, about a real-life "thug" in The Bluff, Atlanta's roughest neighborhood. The film was shown at the 2011 Slamdance Film Festival and at the 2012 Brooklyn Film Festival.
- In 2012, Russell produced the Oscar-winning short film Curfew.
- In 2014, Russell produced the feature-length film Before I Disappear, which was based on Curfew.
- In 2016, Russell directed the short film Cul-de-Sac.
