= Everything is Going to Be OK =

2017 video game

- Steam header art
- Developer: Nathalie Lawhead
- Platforms: Windows, macOS
- Release: 31 January 2017
- Mode: Single-player

Everything is Going to Be OK (stylized EVERYTHING IS GOING TO BE OK) is a 2017 work of digital art by alienmelon, the pseudonym of independent net artist Nathalie Lawhead. Described by Lawhead as an "interactive zine", the work is a vignette of several non-linear and interactive elements informed by Lawhead's experiences with "struggle, survival and coping with the aftermath of surviving bad things". The work received positive reception from publications, with attention directed to the game's use of humor to humanise and relate to experiences of trauma and victimhood, and received several awards and nominations at the Independent Games Festival, IndieCade, and A-MAZE. Following release of the work, Lawhead showcased the game at Double Fine's Day of the Devs event in November 2017, prompting a discussion from Lawhead and media publications about the challenges of publishing and exhibiting experimental or art games and the risks of online harassment relating to streaming of these works.

== Gameplay ==
In-game screenshot depicting the work's user interface

Everything is Going to Be OK is a non-linear interactive work interspersed between a series of individual animations, games, "silly artistic tools (and) cryptic toys" accessed by the player in separate windows. The sections revolve around the experiences of a cartoon bunny and similar characters who are subject to existential angst and comic violence. Many sections are interactive, with players selecting dialogue choices to progress the animations and text similar to interactive fiction. Players navigate between sections of the work by selecting icons in a user interface imitative of an operating system. Several interactions in sections of the work blur the line between the player's computer and the work's user interface, with some sections allowing the player to export files locally to the player's computer, or connecting to the player's Twitter account.

== Development and release ==
Everything is Going to Be OK was conceived by California-based independent developer Nathalie Lawhead as a "cathartic" expression of a "collection of very abstract life experiences, things I felt while going through hard times, and how I felt, or moved on afterward", with the work aiming to open a "discussion about alternative views of power from a survivor's standpoint". Lawhead noted that the work was motivated by "really wanting to talk about these topics" to deconstruct the "veil of shame placed over survivors", in order to normalise the "discussion of victimhood" in literature and explore works "that make us feel uncomfortable, vulnerable, admit a level of brokenness, and that maybe we just can't win." The work was developed by Lawhead over one year of "non-stop, completely focused development" following the completion and showcase of their prior work, Tetrageddon Games, at IndieCade in October 2016. The work was created using self-made tools, with individual pages "built from the ground up".

Lawhead expressed a preference for Everything is Going to Be OK to be viewed and evaluated beyond the typology of a video game, noting the work conforms with the conventions of a zine. They stated the work was closest to a zine as it consists of "pieces of personal writing and abstract cut-together imagery to convey a theme...they're vignettes, which zines often are." In line with this design, Lawhead described the approach to the work as evoking a "collage art style", with an emphasis on distorted archival stock images that were "cut out, magnified and layered (so) it looks like something else," using their own shaders to create a "pixelated, glitch-y effect". Lawhead also stated that they pursued the design of vignettes to convey the work's messages as they "lend well to life commentary" and are "more personable", citing the games Oikospiel by David Kanaga and Problem Attic by Liz Ryerson as inspirations for this approach. Other inspirations applied by Lawhead included the use of a "net-art" aesthetic influenced by "early computer UIs, citing interest in how their "almost alien" design was evocative of a "fever dream" and allowed "use (of) what people expect about computers to surprise them."

From September 2022 to July 2023, Everything is Going to Be OK was showcased at the New York Museum of Modern Art as part of the exhibition Never Alone: Video Games and Other Interactive Design.

== Reception ==
=== Critical reception ===
Everything is Going to Be OK received praise from several publications, with attention directed to the use of humor to humanise and relate experiences of trauma and victimhood. Writing for Mashable, Jess Joho praised the "intimate, grounding humanity" in the tone of the work, noting the work's ability to "transcend pain in the most abstract, humorous way imaginable" in its ability to "flip the script on the victim narrative in the most delightfully unexpected ways". Jay Allen of PC Gamer praised the work's use of player involvement, stating it "brings you into (its) lived experience. It invites you to play along, to understand why it plays and why it is played, to understand and live with its pain for a while", highlighting the work's exploration of the "quiet dignity of simply coping with pain, underneath the performance of being a survivor." Julie Muncy of Wired found the work to be a "compelling" and "potent portrait of living with trauma", citing the effect of the provocative and "deliberately crude" visual design of the work to "elicit discomfort...to explore themes beyond just unease". IGN nominated Everything is Going to Be OK as the "Most Innovative Game" in its Best of 2017 Awards, citing the work's "ability to be both genuinely funny, crude, gruesome, somber, and human all at once", and recommending the work "needs to be experienced to be understood".

=== Controversy ===
Lawhead stated they received harassment following the publication of Everything is Going to Be OK, including in response to their discussion of the reception of the work at Double Fine's Day of the Devs in November 2017. Following the event, Lawhead authored a post recounting their experiences, stating the work was "met with hostility" by younger visitors to the event who were "pretty rude" in their dismissal of the work as "weird". Lawhead suggested that this ridicule reflected an "antagonistic" and reactionary trend against alternative games encouraged by video game livestreaming, and there was a greater need to "carve out the space and understanding" for these works at events and online. Lawhead later clarified their issue was not the dislike their work had faced, but the "outward rudeness" and "intimidating" behaviour of attendees, noting that whilst they "appreciate the exposure" from streamers, they disliked how their "superficial" treatment "invites trolling". Lawhead further discussed that interactive art faces risk when assessed as a video game as "the medium is a consumer medium that's largely (mainstream) incapable of art discourse", and that artistic intent "is a difficult thing to communicate within a medium that expects some sort of entertaining twist."

Lawhead's posts prompted discussions about the challenges and risks faced by developers in exhibiting art games to a broader audience. Stephanic Chan of VentureBeat noted Lawhead's experiences in discussing how "developers are frequent targets of abusers online". Writing for Game Developer, independent developer James Cox suggested the incident reflected a "cultural issue" reflected by the "self-serving" nature of streaming culture, stating "as influencers and trendsetters, video-creators demonstrate to young players how to interact and respond to games. The players (at) Day of the Devs learned their behavior from somewhere", and stating "I don't think it's just streamers and YouTubers, I think it's a cycle." Artists Holly Gramazio and Sophie Sampson of Matheson Marcault discussed the challenges of exhibiting a game at an event, noting that whilst "Lawhead's game is in some ways inaccessible and it rejects many of the conventions that make games easy to grasp in a crowded expo or exhibition environment," they suggested several challenges and effective strategies to "prepare the audience" for experimental works and "create a space that encourages respect".

=== Awards and nominations ===
Everything is Going to Be OK received several awards and nominations from indie game events. At the Independent Games Festival in 2018, the work was a finalist for the Nuovo Award and received an 'Honorable Mention' for the Seumas McNally Grand Prize. Everything is Going to Be OK also received an award for 'Innovation in Interaction Design' at IndieCade in 2017, an award "honoring the specialised artistry and innovation required to engage with games on a new level". The work also received the 'Digital Moment Award' at the 2017 Berlin A-MAZE event, an award in recognition of "poems, statements, experiments, short experiences (and) expressions through an interactive medium".

Awards and nominations received by Everything is Going to Be OK
Year	Award	Category	Result	Ref.
2017	IndieCade Awards	Innovation in Interactive Design	Won	
2017	A-MAZE	Digital Moment Award	Won	
2018	Independent Games Festival	Seumas McNally Grand Prize	Nominated	
2018	Independent Games Festival	Nuovo Award	Nominated	
