= Snow on tha Bluff =

2011 film directed by Damon Russell

- Directed by: Damon Russell
- Written by: Damon Russell; Curtis Snow
- Produced by: Chris Knittel
- Starring: Curtis Snow
- Cinematography: Poncho Perez; Damon Russell
- Edited by: Takashi Doscher
- Production company: Fuzzy Logic Pictures
- Release dates: January 2011 (Slamdance); June 19, 2012
- Running time: 79 minutes
- Country: United States
- Language: English

Snow on tha Bluff is a 2011 American found footage drama film directed by Damon Russell. It stars Curtis Snow, a real-life Atlanta "robbery boy" and drug dealer, playing a fictionalized version of himself, as he gets into various dangerous and criminal situations. The title references an Atlanta neighborhood colloquially known as The Bluff, which is infamous for crime and drug dealing. "Snow" is a double entendre for both the protagonist (Curtis Snow) and cocaine.

The film gained a following within the hip hop community due to its verisimilitude. Actor Michael K. Williams, who was an executive producer on the film, stated, "everything that is wrong with the hood, is in this movie". An unauthorized sequel, Snow on tha Bluff 2, starring Snow and Snoop Dogg, was released direct-to-video in 2015.

== Plot ==
Three college students drive to the Bluff, a westside Atlanta neighborhood, intending to buy some drugs from a dealer. Clearly naive, they joke about flirting in hopes of getting free drugs, and reassure one another that they have nothing to fear. One of the students holds a camera with the hope of filming the encounter. They find a dealer named Curtis Snow, who asks them to drive him to his house in order to fulfill their order.

Once they arrive, Curtis pulls out a gun, robs them of their purses and camera, and makes a hasty escape. Recognizing the quality of the camera, he hands it to one of his friends, telling him to continue filming no matter what in order to capture their day-to-day life as it occurs.

Curtis soon learns that another group of drug dealers have encroached on his territory, selling drugs not far from his street. He recruits his friends and robs the rivals of their drug supply. When a friend tips him off to another gang selling drugs nearby, he invades their house with the help of his friend and robs them of their supply as well.

While playing at a pool hall, Curtis recognizes a rival drug dealer with his familiar white hat, who likewise takes note of Curtis. The man in the white hat follows Curtis into his territory, asking the locals about him, but the surface threat doesn't faze Curtis and he continues to hustle. On his way back home after cutting the latest stolen product with his crew, Curtis is ambushed in a backyard alleyway by a gunman seconds after looking "white hat" in the eye. Luckily the bullet wounds are not fatal and the ambusher's gun jams right as he comes close to Curtis, allowing him to flee. He collapses in the street nearby, where he is found by a police patrol and subsequently arrested in connection with a prior robbery, and spends four months in jail.

After his release from jail, Curtis is enthusiastically welcomed back by his neighborhood, and is clearly anxious to get right back into the drug dealing game. He attempts to get revenge by ambushing "white hat's" girlfriend, but in retaliation, they kill his girlfriend and mother of his child. Her death causes Curtis to sink into depression, as he now has to take care of his young son while continuing to deal drugs. In one scene, as he cuts and bags up crack to sell, he explains how he watched his uncle do exactly the same thing when he was a kid, and comments that his son is the same age he was and watching him engage in the same behavior.

Soon after, however, Curtis meets a friend to discuss up-to-date information on a mark. En route to shake down this dealer, the car that they're in is once again ambushed by rival gang members. Curtis and his crew return fire then give chase only to be intercepted by the police, causing everyone to bail on foot. Returning home after losing the police, Curtis is enraged by the turn of events and wrecks a room, then quietly smokes pot and watches his son play in the debris.

The movie ends with Curtis calling a number from an ad he found about movie editing. He tells them he has a movie for them and makes a meeting. It's obvious that his movie idea is for "Snow on tha Bluff."

== Cast and crew ==
The film was directed by Damon Russell and stars Curtis Snow (playing himself). The film was produced by Chris Knittel.

== Exhibition at festivals and awards ==
Snow on tha Bluff has been shown at film festivals:

- The film premiered at the 2011 Slamdance Film Festival, a showcase for the discovery of new and emerging talent in the film industry
- 2011 Atlanta Film Festival
- 2011 Certificate of Outstanding Achievement to Takashi Doscher for editing—Brooklyn Film Festival
- 2011 Best Feature Film Award at Atlanta Underground Film Festival
- 2011 Best Feature Film at Chicago Underground Film Festival
- 2011 Filmmaker Magazine's: 25 New Faces of Independent Film 2011
- Sound On Sight rated the Snow On Tha Bluff poster a Grade A. It was described as, "Raw, and poetic, the skin is the story, beautiful and shocking, its scars, its warpaint, its sorrow."

== Production and marketing ==
Actor Michael K. Williams executive produced the film under his company, Freedome Production; it was Williams' first executive producer credit.

Producer Chris Knittel utilized a series of unorthodox guerrilla marketing techniques. He revealed to Filmmaker magazine, "I would buy a couple hundred blank VHS tapes, copy a scene from the movie on it, throw the tape in the dirt, put some blood on it and seal it in a manilla envelope. From there, I would send out the tapes with no return address to politicians, conservative groups, police stations and various factions in the media. Operation 'stir up shit,' was now in progress."

== Distribution ==
In early 2012, Screen Media Films purchased Snow on tha Bluff for a 2012 release. The release date was June 19, 2012.

UK distributor Showbox Media Group announced that Snow on tha Bluff would be released on Blu-ray November 12, 2012.

== Impact ==
An attempt on Curtis Snow's life occurred in December 2011. He survived a grisly box-cutter knife attack.

A melee broke out at the film's showing at the Atlanta Film Festival, as some audience members were unsure of the authenticity of a scene in which a child puts his hands into a pile of crack cocaine with a razor blade in it.

As a result of officers seeing part of the film, the Atlanta Police Department contacted the filmmakers in connection with an investigation into a string of home invasions.

Rapper B.o.B.'s 2012 mixtape Fuck 'Em We Ball is named after a quote from Snow on tha Bluff. B.o.B. said of the film, "I put it up there with movies like Slumdog Millionaire, City of God, and Shottas. You don’t know what’s real and what’s fake. One of the characters says 'Fuck em, we ball' and it really just stuck with me. That's where I'm at right now in my career, ‘Fuck em, I’m doing what I wanna do.’ I'm not conforming."

Rapper T.I. put Curtis Snow in his music video for "Trap Back Jumpin".

Rapper Killer Mike released a 2013 song inspired by the movie called "Snowin' in the Bluff".

Rapper Gucci Mane makes reference to Curtis Snow in his songs "Dope Show" and "Dead Man".

Rapper Kevin Gates mentions the film in his song "Mexico".

J. Cole titled his 2020 single “Snow on tha Bluff” in reference to the film.

Curtis Snow was arrested after a three hour long stand off with a SWAT team in an Atlanta funeral home in May 2016. After locking himself inside the women's bathroom, police extracted him using tear gas. He was arrested on an unrelated Aggravated Assault warrant.

== Unauthorized sequel ==
An unauthorized low-budget sequel, Snow on tha Bluff 2, was released direct-to-video in 2015; it starred Snow and Snoop Dogg, and was directed by JT the Bigga Figga. The filmmakers did not get the permission from Fuzzy Logic Pictures, resulting in the production company suing Snoop Dogg and his company Trapflix in federal court for multiple counts of copyright infringement in August 2015. In July 2016, a California federal judge awarded Fuzzy Logic damages and entered a permanent injunction ordering another entity and its owner from ever using the company's movie trademark again. Fuzzy Logic settled with Snoop Dogg for contributory copyright infringement after their lawyers came to a mutual agreement for closure.

== See also ==
- List of hood films
