= Tetrageddon Games =

2016 video game

- Steam header art
- Developer: Nathalie Lawhead
- Platforms: Windows, macOS
- Release: Web 4 October 2012; Desktop 12 May 2016
- Mode: Single-player

Tetrageddon Games is an online compilation of video games and digital art by alienmelon, the pseudonym of independent developer and net artist Nathalie Lawhead. First published as a website titled Tetrageddon, hosting web games designed by Lawhead from 2008. Lawhead combined the releases into a compiled form on the website from 2012, receiving several iterations and revisions over time, and released a downloadable desktop release titled ARMAGAD in 2016. Following release, critics praised Tetrageddon Games for its eclectic mixture of aesthetics and gameplay styles. The project received several awards and nominations, including a Webby Award for the website version and a Nuovo Award at the Independent Games Festival.

== Development and release ==
The visual aesthetic of Tetrageddon Games was strongly influenced by Lawhead's nostalgia for early web and interactive media design.

Tetrageddon Games was a collection of interactive web games developed by Lawhead and collaborators and hosted on the website Tetrageddon, a landing page created in 2008. Games published on the website were open-source, allowing users to collaborate with Lawhead by downloading and modifying the game files. In October 2012, under the initial title Tetrageddon Arcade, Lawhead compiled the games on the Tetrageddon website into a single freeware project. A downloadable desktop version of Tetrageddon Games was published to Game Jolt on 12 May 2016. Following the discontinuation of Flash integration, a revised version of the website was overhauled and introduced on the Tetrageddon website in 2021. A Steam version was released on 29 June 2023.

Describing the project as "experimental", Lawhead stated the objective of Tetrageddon Games was to explore the Internet as a medium for creating interactive games, designed to reflect "the fast-paced nature of web humor" and taking influence from internet hypermedia, interactive literature and pop art. The visual presentation of the project combined a mixture of "hand-drawn vector art with dynamically generated or code-drawn visuals" in order to deliberately combine disparate styles and techniques that reflected this theme. Lawhead described the compilation as a "love letter to the internet of old", particularly in the design of its user interfaces, and was strongly influenced by the nostalgia of early web design and computer games.

== Reception ==
=== Critical reception ===
Describing the game as "playful and delightful", Alice O'Connor of Rock Paper Shotgun expressed that the compilation was a "bigger and weirder" summation of Lawhead's work due to its breadth of content, with the website citing the game as one of the best titles of 2016. Sophie Henry of Communication Arts expressed that Tetrageddon Games was "one of the most interesting pieces of interactive art I've seen", highlighting its "provocative and modern" collection of "references in style and content to old video games, Internet memes (and) digital pop culture". Leigh Alexander of Boing Boing praised the collection as "delightful" and "nostalgic", highlighting the game's "multifaceted" assimilation of net art and gameplay. Writing for Twinfinite, Andres Ruiz found the web version of the collection to feature games that were "wholly unique" and "bursting with personality", remarking that the game resembled "more of an interactive art piece than a video game" at times.

=== Accolades ===
Tetrageddon Games received several awards and nominations, most notably including receiving the Nuovo Award at the 2015 Independent Games Festival and a Webby Award in 2022, as well as selections at the 2013 SXSW Interactive Awards and 2016 IndieCade. On 26 May 2012, Tetrageddon Games received the 'Site of the Day' on The Favorite Website Awards. Select titles from Tetrageddon Games were showcased at the 2015 Fantastic Fest Fantastic Arcade and the 2016 Game Developers Conference.

Awards and nominations received by Tetrageddon Games
Year	Award	Category	Result	Ref.
2013	SXSW Austin	Interactive Award	Nominated	
2015	Independent Games Festival	Nuovo Award	Won	
2016	IndieCade	Official Selection	Nominated	
2022	Webby Award	Weird	Won	
