= Paola Antonelli =

Italian architect, curator, author, and educator

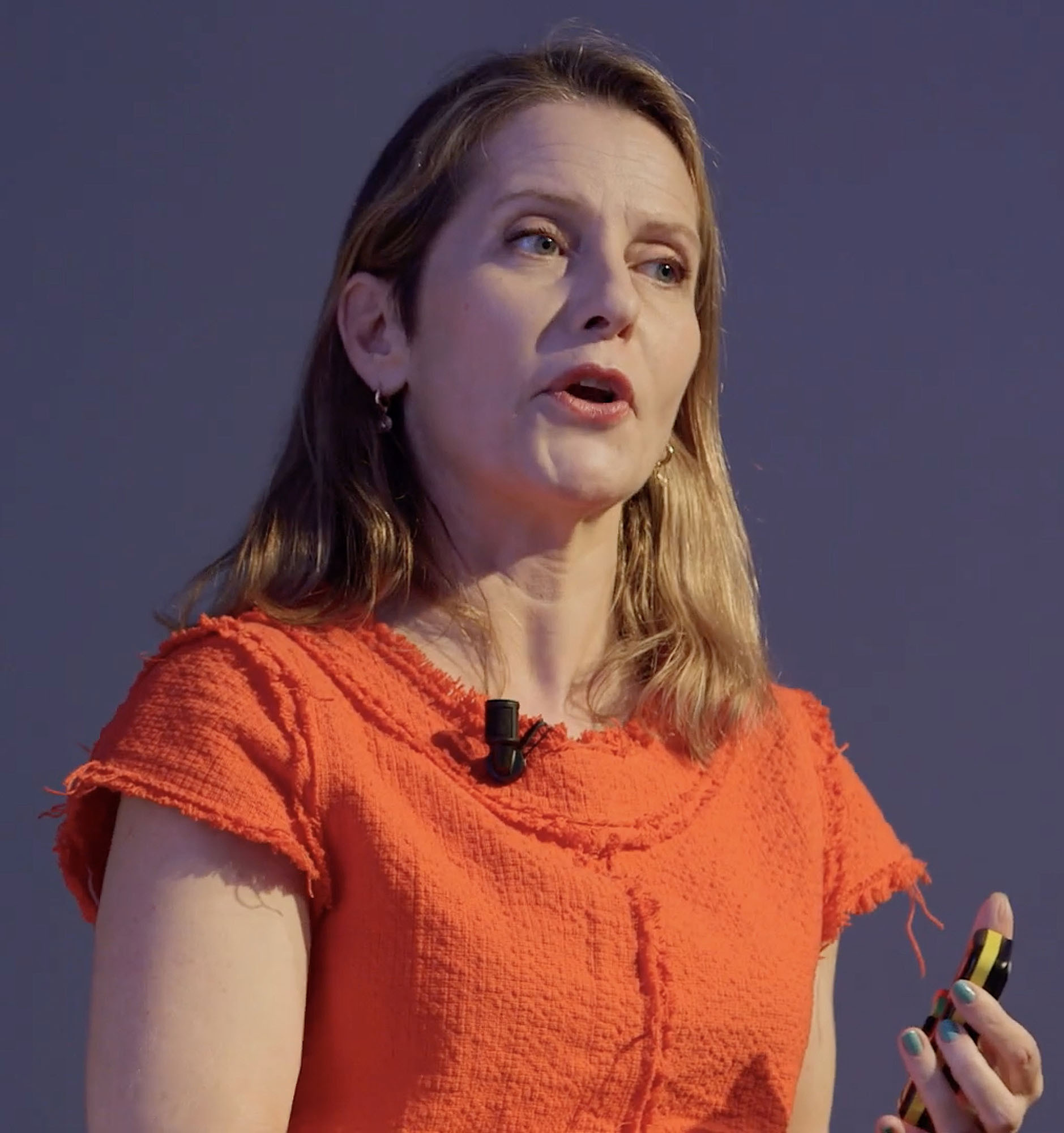
- Antonelli at the WEF event in Davos, 2015
- Born: 1963 (age 62–63); Sassari, Sardinia, Italy
- Education: Polytechnic University of Milan (Architecture)
- Occupation: Curator
- Organization(s): Museum of Modern Art (MoMA), New York
- Title: Senior Curator of Architecture and Design; Director of Research and Development
- Awards: National Design Award; Art Directors Club Hall of Fame; AIGA Medal; Compasso d'Oro; London Design Medal; German Design Award; et al.

Lecture by Paola Antonelli about Visions of Digital Creativity Organic Design at the World Economic Forum

Paola Antonelli (born 1963) is an Italian author, critic, and curator. She heads the architecture and design department of the Museum of Modern Art in New York, where she is also the founding Director of Research and Development. Antonelli has been described as "one of the 25 most incisive design visionaries in the world" by TIME magazine. She has said that all objects tell stories, and that "some objects [...] make history – or change it."

== Early life and education ==
Antonelli was born in Sassari, Sardinia. She attended Politecnico di Milano and graduated in 1990 with a degree in architecture. Notwithstanding her training, she has never worked as an architect.

== Work and career ==
After graduating from university, Antonelli curated several architecture and design exhibitions in Italy, France, and Japan. She worked for Domus magazine from 1987 to 1991, and was the design editor of Abitare magazine from 1992 to 1994. Her writing has also been published in the Harvard Design Magazine, Metropolis, I.D., Paper, Metropolitan Home, Harper's Bazaar, and Nest.

=== Lecturer ===
From 1991 to 1993, Antonelli was a lecturer at the University of California, Los Angeles, where she taught design history and theory. In the spring of 2003, she started to teach a course in design theory at the Harvard University Graduate School of Design. She has also lectured elsewhere on design and architecture in Europe and the United States and taught a related massive open online course titled Fashion as Design. She has also served on international architecture and design competition juries.

=== Curator at The Museum of Modern Art ===
Antonelli joined the Museum of Modern Art (MoMA) in 1994 as a curator in the Department of Architecture and Design, where she is now the senior curator and the founding Director of Research and Development.

The first important exhibition at the museum curated by Antonelli opened in 1995 and was titled Mutant Materials in Contemporary Design. This was followed in 1996 by Thresholds: Contemporary Design from the Netherlands; Achille Castiglioni: Design! in 1997 (through 1998); Projects 66: Campana/Ingo Maurer in 1999; Open Ends and Matter (September 2000 – February 2001). Her 2001 exhibition Workspheres was devoted to the design of the workplace of the near future. In 2005 she curated the exhibition entitled Safe: Design Takes on Risk also at MoMA.

She curated the exhibition entitled "Safe" in 2005 based on her show at the International Design Conference in Aspen (August 20–23, 2003), similarly entitled "Safe: Design Takes on Risk." Other recent projects include a book about food worldwide, as examples of distinctive design, and a television program on design. As a curator, Antonelli has added various video games to the permanent collection of the Museum of Modern Art and she has been attempting to include Boeing 747 in MoMA's permanent collection as well.

Together with Jamer Hunt, Antonelli established an installation entitled Design and Violence which focuses on the physical representation of some of humanity's most prominent features, such as sex, aggression, and smelliness. One piece, for example, is a vial of synthetic sweat. Of the exhibit, Antonelli says, "We wanted objects that have an ambiguous relationship with violence." Each object—an outline of a drone, a self-guided bullet, a stiletto—is selected to highlight both the beneficial and also destructive side of design. Design is multidimensional nowadays, and Antonelli and Hunt aimed to represent this.

In 2017, Antonelli and Michelle Millar Fisher curated "Items: Is Fashion Modern?", an exhibition that explores 111 items of clothing and accessories that have had a strong impact on the world in the 20th and 21st centuries.

In an exhibit featuring video games such as Pac-Man, Tetris, and Minecraft, viewers are intended to actually play the games to showcase the interaction design of these products. The Guardian, for example, responded, "Sorry MoMA, Video Games Are Not Art".

She has said that she believes that "design has been kind of neglected or misconstrued as decoration or as an embellishment" and has described her work as an attempt to change that misperception, further saying that "Without designers, life would not happen because any kind of scientific or technological innovation gets filtered by design and becomes part of our life. Without designers, we couldn’t use microwaves, we couldn’t use the internet, we couldn’t use so many innovations.

In a review of Antonelli's 2025 exhibition, Pirouette: Turning Points in Design, Architectural Record observed that "in a climate where even the most anodyne appeals for inclusion and peace suddenly seem so aberrant, Antonelli’s game feels like a surprisingly brave one." The review also remarked that "putting the everyday, the ephemeral, and the commercial under the intellectual spotlight" shows to what extent MoMA and its curator are willing to go in order to "broaden the purview of the institution – and presumably its audience".

=== Recognition and awards ===
In 2014, Antonelli was awarded an honorary doctorate by the Royal College of Art. She was recognized with an AIGA Medal in 2015 for "expanding the influence of design in everyday life by sharing fresh and incisive observations and curating provocative exhibitions at MoMA". She was named one of the 100 most powerful people in the world of art by Art Review and Surface Magazine. She also received honorary degrees from Kingston University in London, ArtCenter College of Design in Pasadena, and Pratt Institute in New York. She received the following distinctions: 2006 National Design Award, Cooper Hewitt (Smithsonian Institution); 2007 TIME magazine design visionaries; 2010 Lucky Strike Designer Award (Raymond Loewy Foundation); 2011 Hall of Fame inductee, Art Directors Club (ADC); 2019 American Academy in Rome honouree; 2020 London Design Medal; and the 2021 German Design Award Personality of the Year. Antonelli was awarded the 2024 Compasso d'Oro alla Carriera 'for career achievement'.

== Publications ==
=== Books ===
- Antonelli, Paola (1995). Mutant materials in contemporary design. Eric Baker, Gaetano Pesce, Museum of Modern Art. New York: Museum of Modern Art. ISBN 0-87070-131-2. OCLC 33048895.
- Achille Castiglioni: Design!
- Vittori, Arturo; Antonelli, Paola; Vogler, Andreas (2009). Architecture and vision: from pyramids to spacecraft. Italian Cultural Institute. ISBN 978-3-00-026959-2 OCLC 434052580.
- Antonelli, Paola (2011). Talk to me: design and the communication between people and objects. Museum of Modern Art. New York, N.Y.: Museum of Modern Art. ISBN 978-0-87070-796-4 OCLC 721928452.
- Antonelli, Paola (2000). Achille Castiglioni. Steven Guarnaccia (1. ed ed.). Mantova: Corraini. ISBN 88-87942-02-1 OCLC 47283354
- Museum of Modern Art (2000). Modern contemporary: art at MoMA since 1980. Kirk Varnedoe, Paola Antonelli, Joshua Siegel. New York, NY: Museum of Modern Art. ISBN 0-87070-021-9 OCLC 48045632
- Design and the elastic mind. Paola Antonelli, Museum of Modern Art. New York: Museum of Modern Art. 2008. ISBN 978-0-87070-732-2. OCLC 780473124.
- Pakhalé, Satyendra (2002). Satyendra Pakhalé, cultural nomad: from projects to products = dal progetto al prodotto. Ingeborg de Roode, Alberto Alessi, Amsterdam. Stedelijk Museum. [Milan]: Editoriale Modo. ISBN 88-7419-002-6 OCLC 642828852.
- Museum of Modern Art (2000). Modern contemporary: art at MoMA since 1980. Kirk Varnedoe, Paola Antonelli, Joshua Siegel. New York, NY: Museum of Modern Art. ISBN 0-87070-021-9. OCLC 48045632
- Jongerius, Hella (2010). Hella Jongerius : misfit. Irma Boom, Louise Schouwenberg, Alice Rawsthorn, Paola Antonelli. London: Phaidon. ISBN 978-0-7148-5987-3 OCLC 668199062.
- Sparke, Penny (2009). Japanese design (1st ed.). New York, NY: Museum of Modern Art. ISBN 978-0-87070-739-1. OCLC 276334220.
- Antonelli, Paola (2001). Workspheres : design and contemporary work styles. Department of Architecture and Design. New York, N.Y.: Museum of Modern Art. ISBN 0-87070-013-8 OCLC 46491049.
- Antonelli, Paola (2005). Safe: design takes on risk. Museum of Modern Art. New York, N.Y.: Museum of Modern Art. ISBN 0-87070-580-6 OCLC 61217850.
- Helfand, Margaret; Antonelli, Paola (1999). Margaret Helfand Architects : essential architecture. New York: Monacelli Press. ISBN 1-885254-93-8 OCLC 39923042.
- Rawsthorn, Alice; Antonelli, Paola (2022). Design emergency : building a better future. London. ISBN 978-1-83866-427-5 OCLC 1308475961.

=== Contributions ===
- Pasta by Design – Forward
- On the Table – On the American Table
- Droog Design – Spirit of the Nineties
- No Discipline – Preface
- Items: Is Fashion Modern?
- "Satyendra Pakhalé Culture of Creation"

== See also ==
- List of works in the MoMA collection of architecture and design
