= Dujanah =

2017 video game

- Developer: Jack King-Spooner
- Platforms: Windows; macOS; Linux
- Release: Windows; September 19, 2017 macOS; October 22, 2017; Linux; October 25, 2017
- Genre: Art game
- Mode: Single-player

Dujanah is an art video game developed and published by Jack King-Spooner, a Scottish indie game developer. It was released on September 19, 2017. The game follows Dujanah, a Muslim woman in a fictional country under the occupation of foreign powers in a stylized magic realist–style world as she tries to find out what happened to her husband and daughter. The game focuses on the theme of death, and explores it through the stories of people that Dujanah meets as she walks through her country. Reception to Dujanah was positive, with praise focused on its themes and storytelling.

== Gameplay ==
Dujanah watches a band perform in her town. The game's claymation visual style is on display here.

The player controls Dujanah, a Muslim woman that lives inside of a fictional country in a magic realist styled world that is under the occupation of foreign powers. In the beginning of the game, the rest of her family is killed by one of the occupying armies of their country while they leave the house to bury the family hamster. Dujanah travels throughout the area and talks with people while ruminating on her loss and trying to come to grips with what has happened to her family. Events in the game have randomized elements which makes each playthrough a unique experience. Dujanah traverses the desert between locations via a giant robot. The player interacts with characters throughout the game and learns their stories, and is also able to play six different games within the game at an arcade in Dujanah's hometown of Touf Lajjel. One of the games within a game, Caves of Al Dajjal, is a Metroidvania-style platformer that re-emphasizes the major themes of the game. Themes of the game focus in detail on death and the threat of sudden death on the inhabitants of the country. The game is made in a claymation-style that is a hallmark of King-Spooner's work.

== Development ==
Dujanah was developed by indie video game developer Jack King-Spooner. Initially, King-Spooner wanted to develop a game that was set in Belarus after the fallout from the Chernobyl disaster, but he decided that the setting should be more topical. The idea for the character of Dujanah came from wanting to create an inverse of the main character from his semi-autobiographical game Beeswing along with giving representation to a group that is generally underrepresented in both media generally and video games specifically. In order to familiarize himself with a setting in an unnamed Muslim country, the Scottish King-Spooner said that he "spent time researching and talking with people relevant to the subject" and was determined to avoid the "ideological and symbolic ‘otherness’ that many media decisions exacerbate." When creating the story, King-Spooner was inspired by Point Omega and Ratner's Star. King-Spooner was particularly inspired by the random, but fully fleshed out characters in Ratner's Star that "amount to an overall feeling greater than the sum of its parts." King-Spooner also noted that he was inspired by trying to understand the contemporary political climate and that he was interested in the theme of death. In preparing to make the game, King-Spooner held background interviews with people ranging from Muslim apostates to a Scottish veteran of the War in Afghanistan.

In order to get funding for the game, King-Spooner launched a successful Kickstarter. When running the Kickstarter campaign and based on his previous experience with Beeswing, King-Spooner decided to give more digital rewards to backers versus physical ones which were harder to fulfill. King-Spooner worked on Dujanah during "the evenings and weekends."

== Reception ==
Kotaku's Leah Williams called the game "an extremely interesting piece of art" and noted that years after initially playing it, she "still [thinks] about it regularly." PC Gamer's Jay Allen gave the game a generally positive review, calling it "a delirious fugue state of mourning" and that it largely succeeded in bringing the player to a place to share the character Dujanah's crippling sense of loss—Allen also criticized the Caves of Al Dajjal game within a game, calling it "out of place" and so frustrating to play that it fails to convey the meaning that it was intended to. Kotaku's Heather Alexandra in a very positive review felt that the game, despite its focus on death, "reminded that life is still full of interesting people to meet and places to see."

Critical reception highlighted Dujanah repeatedly as one of the highlights from a large racial justice video game bundle sale that happened on the website Itch.io which included over 1,500 games.

=== Sales ===
An initial reaction from Rock Paper Shotgun's Dominic Tarason noted that the release seemed to have "largely slipped under the radar" and that "it's sad that it launched to so little fanfare."
