= Dead Hands Dig Deep =

- Directed by: Jai Love
- Written by: Jai Love; Spencer T. Heath
- Produced by: Spencer T. Heath; Alan Love-Lapan
- Starring: Edwin Borsheim; Rikk Agnew
- Cinematography: Hazal Alakus
- Edited by: Conlan Mackenzie
- Music by: Spencer T. Heath; Jeremiah Weber
- Production company: Lonesome Pictures
- Distributed by: Slamdance Studios; Monster Pictures
- Release date: January 22, 2016
- Running time: 75 minutes
- Country: United States
- Language: English

Dead Hands Dig Deep is a 2016 American documentary film and the directorial debut of Jai Love. The film follows a now thirty-eight-year-old Edwin Borsheim, vocalist of the infamous and controversial deathrock band Kettle Cadaver as he reflects on his dark past.

== Plot ==
Thirty-eight-year-old Edwin Borsheim of the band Kettle Cadaver was once known for his stage antics and brutal self-mutilation. Now, years after the band's demise, Borsheim has fallen into complete seclusion on his acre of land. As Borsheim spirals further, those closest to Borsheim dissect his mental complexes as he reflects on his past.

== Development ==
The film was shot in Temecula, California and produced by Lonesome Pictures. Prior to the production of the film, there was an extensive search for Borsheim. Although his residence had been confirmed, there were different variables that stood in the way of actual contact. At the time, Borsheim had no phone or email and his property was guarded by his watch-dogs which made it virtually impossible to come in contact with him. After resigning the idea of making the film, Borsheim's relatives activated a phone for him and put the filmmakers in contact. The film began production months after they started their search.

On the first day of principal shooting, Borsheim began directing violent threats at the film crew. Borsheim made it clear that until the production of the film, he had no guests in over a year, and had been completely alone in his residence. When first in talks with Borsheim over the phone, the filmmakers began receiving disturbing pictures from Borsheim. As production continued, other members of the crew began to receive similar images. Due to the Borsheim brothers being on bad terms with their mother, both refused to see her for the film. After much pleading from the producers, brother Danny Borsheim begrudgingly escorted the crew to see his mother to interview her for the documentary. Multiple times during post-production, Edwin went off the grid. His phone was de-activated many times and he was on and off of his property, making communication difficult. When Borsheim's property was meant to be seized due to his not paying property taxes, he stated that he planned to kill anyone who tried to seize his property and then commit suicide once he came back into contact with the producers. Eventually, his family intervened and paid the taxes he owed.

Borsheim called making the film therapeutic and often stayed in contact with many of the crew after its completion. He also attended a special screening of the film at the ArcLight cinema in Hollywood. Borsheim died by suicide on June 20, 2017.

== Reception ==
The film has received positive reviews from The Hollywood Reporter calling it 'a haunting study of depravity', Indiewire, and RogerEbert.com. The film has also screened at several film festivals including Slamdance Film Festival, Fantasia International Film Festival, Lausanne Underground Film and Music Festival, Sidewalk Moving Picture Festival and Sydney Underground Film Festival.

== Release ==
The documentary premiered at the 2016 Slamdance Film Festival in Park City, Utah and was purchased by Slamdance Studios, who sold onto Hulu as well as Monster Pictures who handled a special edition DVD. The film was released theatrically and on VOD in November, 2017.
