= Scrapper (2011 film) =

2011 American documentary feature film

Scrapper is a 2011 American documentary feature film directed by Stephan Wassmann and co-directed by Olivier Hermitant. It documents the lives of persons who salvage scrap metal from the Chocolate Mountain live-fire military testing range in Southern California.

Scrapper won Best Documentary at the Seattle True Independent Film Festival and the Spirit Award at the Brooklyn Film Festival in June 2011. This feature documentary had its world premiere at the 2011 Slamdance Film Festival. It was also an official nominee at the Durango Film Festival and won a Royal Reel Award at the Canada International Film Festival Scrapper is an official nominee at the 2011 San Francisco DocFest and the 25th Annual Leeds Film Festival (Nov. 2011) in the UK.

== Personnel ==
- Director — Stephan Wassmann
- Co-director — Olivier Hermitant
- Producer — Stephan Wassmann
- Co-producers — Olivier Hermitant and Michael DiGregorio
- Writers — Stephan Wassmann and Michael DiGregorio
- Editor — Stephan Wassmann
- Cinematographer — Stephan Wassmann
- Additional writing — Olivier Hermitant
- Sound Mix — George Lockwood
