= OK, Good =

- Directed by: Daniel Martinico
- Written by: Hugo Armstrong; Daniel Martinico
- Starring: Hugo Armstrong
- Distributed by: Slamdance Studios and Cinedigm
- Release dates: January 22, 2012 (Slamdance); November 5, 2013 (Cinedigm)
- Running time: 79 minutes
- Country: United States
- Language: English

OK, Good is an American independent film directed by Daniel Martinico. The film stars Hugo Armstrong as Paul Kaplan, a struggling actor on the verge of a breakdown.

== Release ==
OK, Good premiered at the 2012 Slamdance Film Festival, and made its international debut at the 59th Annual Sydney Film Festival. It subsequently screened at the Atlanta Film Festival, the Independent Film Festival of Boston, the New Orleans Film Festival, Raindance, and the Chicago Underground Film Festival, among others.

The film was acquired and released by Slamdance Studios in partnership with Cinedigm Corp in 2013. It is now available to watch on streaming platforms such as Amazon Prime.
