= Stranger Things (film) =

1989 film directed by Eleanor Burke and Ron Eyal

- Directed by: Eleanor Burke; Ron Eyal
- Written by: Eleanor Burke; Ron Eyal
- Produced by: Eleanor Burke; Ron Eyal
- Starring: Adeel Akhtar; Bridget Collins
- Cinematography: Eleanor Burke
- Edited by: Eleanor Burke; Michael Taylor
- Production company: Faces Films
- Release date: 2010
- Running time: 77 minutes
- Countries: United States; United Kingdom
- Language: English

Stranger Things is a 2010 British drama film directed by Eleanor Burke and Ron Eyal. It details the bond that grows between Mani, a homeless vagrant, and Oona, a lonely woman who allows him to stay in her garden shed. Critical reaction to the film has been positive, with The New York Times calling it "unexpectedly profound".

== Plot ==
The movie centers around two different people that form an unusual bond, a woman struggling to cope with death of a loved one and a homeless man on the fringes of society with his own struggles. They corss path unexpectedly, and over time they form a friendship. And they start challenging each other's worldviews and help each other confront their own personal trauma. The film shows themes like loss, grief, isolation, societal margins, and human connection in unlikely places.
