= Nathalie Lawhead =

Net artist and independent game designer

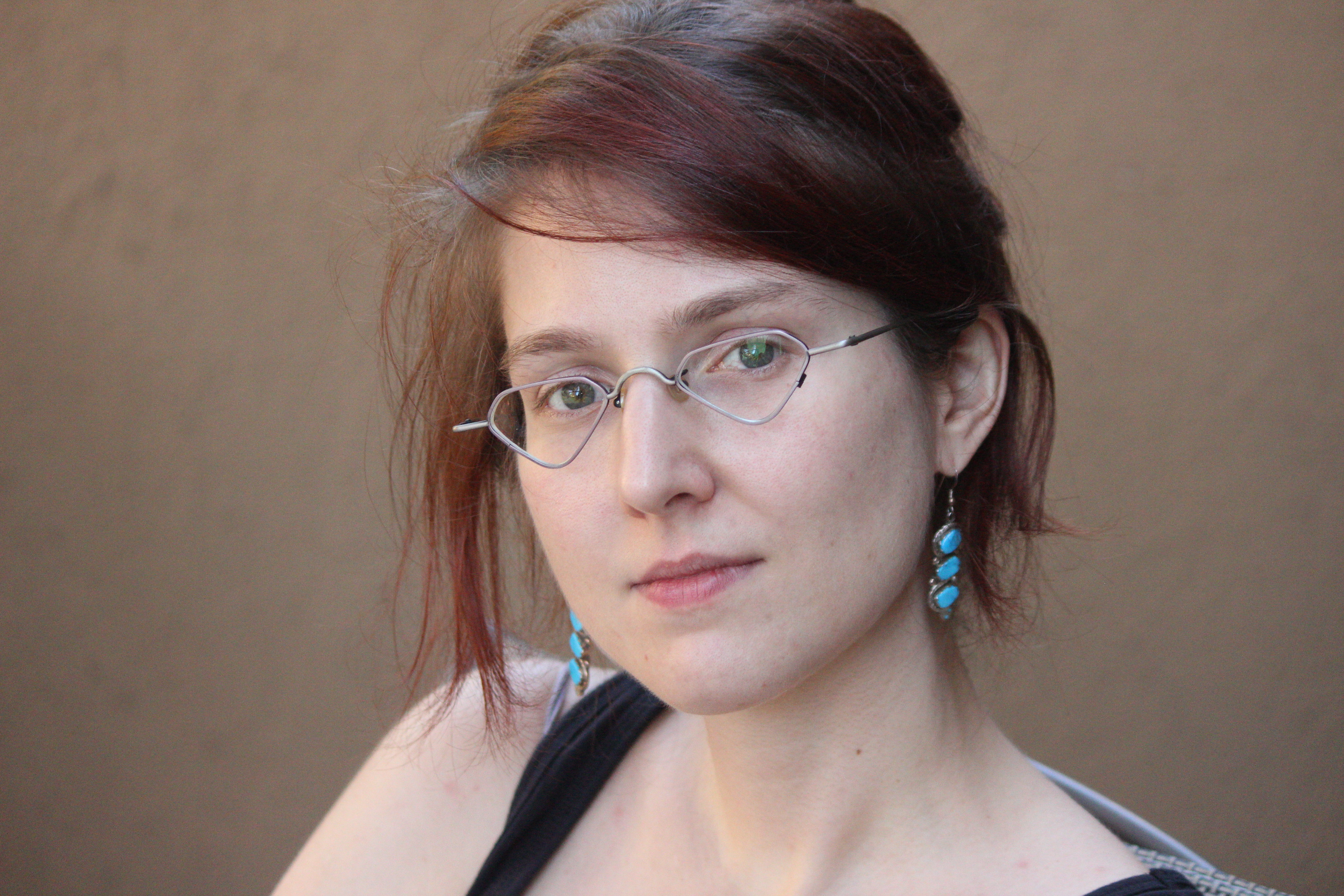
- Known for: indie games, net art
- Notable work: Tetrageddon Games, Everything is Going to Be OK, A_DESKTOP_LOVE_STORY
- Awards: Nuovo Award 2015, A MAZE. Digital Moment Award 2016, Indiecade Interaction Award 2017

Nathalie Lawhead is an independent net artist and video game designer residing in Irvine, California.

== Career ==
Lawhead's career started in the mid-to-late nineties, with various pieces of net-art and poetry, culminating in the release of Blue Suburbia in 1999, a project created in collaboration with their (Note: Lawhead is non-binary and uses they/them pronouns.) mother, Milena Lawhead. Their work often existed in a middleground, adopting various elements from trends in circles that used Adobe Flash, whilst still retaining an HTML focus common with many net-artists, eventually having their work described colloquially as 'games' by critics online. Lawhead's other early work has mostly been lost, due to issues with inaccessibility and changing technologies, such as removal of support for Flash. This history of ephemeral projects has continued to inspire their current body of work, which often adopts motifs of digital graveyards, anarchic technology, and the fleeting nature of artistic existence on the internet.

In 2019, Lawhead accused video game composer Jeremy Soule of rape. No formal charges were filed in connection with the allegations.

=== MoMA induction ===
Following the release of Lawhead's game Everything is Going to Be OK, the title was included in the Museum of Modern Art's 2022 exhibition Never Alone: Video Games as Interactive Design, an exhibit that included a series of 35 different works spanning the development of video games as an art form, and exploring their validity as works of design art. Lawhead's work was eventually inducted into the museum's permanent collection following the exhibition, making the MoMA the first major artistic institution to include Lawhead's game in their catalogue.

== Works ==
- Blue Suburbia (1999) - Interactive website, codeveloped with Milena Lawhead
- Tetrageddon Games (2016)
- Everything is Going to Be OK (2017)
- A_DESKTOP_LOVE_STORY (2018)
- Electric File Monitor (2018) – A program that scans a user's computer and makes assessments on their files
- RUNONCE (remember_me) (2019) – A digital pet game that can only be played once per installation
- Mackerelmedia Fish (2020)
- Electric Zine Maker (2021) – Open source zine making tool
- Blue Suburbia (2024) – A remake of the 1999 work

== Awards ==
- 2015 - IGF Nuovo Award for Tetrageddon Games
- 2017 - Indiecade Interaction Award for Everything is Going to Be OK
- 2017 - A.MAZE Digital Moment Award for Everything is Going to Be OK
