= Beeswing, Dumfries and Galloway =

Village in Dumfries and Galloway, Scotland

Coordinates: 55°00′25″N 03°43′39″W

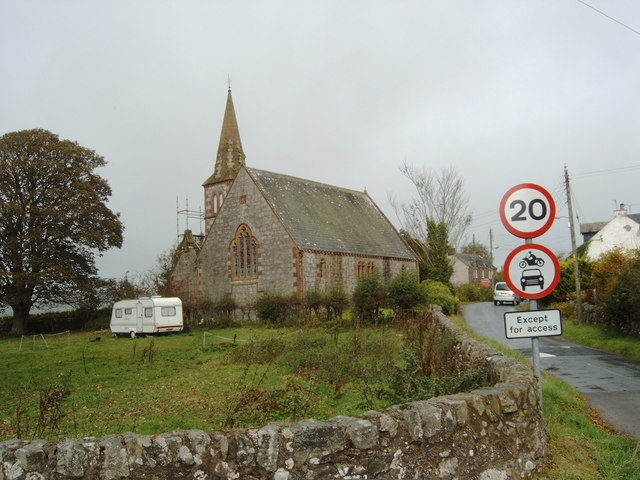
Beeswing

Beeswing is a small village in the historical county of Kirkcudbrightshire in Scotland.

== Etymology ==
Before Beeswing became known as Beeswing, it was named West Park of Loch Arthur (shown in the census in 1841 and 1851) because the first house built by the local blacksmith was built on the land called West Park. As more houses were built, the village later became known as “Sclate Row” which means a row of houses with slate roofs. This row of houses is shown as Beeswing on the first edition of the six inch to the mile Ordnance Survey published in 1854.

The village was named Beeswing in 1847 to honour Beeswing (1833–1854), a 19th-century British Thoroughbred racehorse from the north of England. Beeswing was hailed as the greatest mare in Britain and one of the greatest of all time. Entering 63 events, she won 51 times; of the 57 races she finished, she placed lower than second only once. Her most notable victory was in the Ascot Gold Cup of 1842. She won the Newcastle Cup six times, and was retired after winning the Doncaster Cup for the fourth time.

A local public house in the nearby parish of New Abbey was named Beeswing in the 1840s, though the association between racehorse and settlement has been known for as long as it has been called Beeswing. The entry in the Ordnance Survey Object Name Book, written in 1847, states:

A row of houses in good repair having a garden attached to each. The property of Jas. McLeod of Drumjohn. The name originates from one of the houses being used as a public house and having for its sign board the likeness of a famed racehorse called the Beeswing.

There was no church showing in Beeswing on the 1854 edition, but it is shown on the 1895 Ordnance Survey. The Church in Beeswing was named Lochend Church because it previously operated from a barn at Lochend Farm. The village of Beeswing was never named Lochend, as some sources suggest; the Ordnance Surveys show, the name Lochend was only for the church, not the village. Killywhan railway station nearby was open from 1859 to 1959 on the Castle Douglas and Dumfries Railway.

== Loch Arthur Community ==
The Loch Arthur Community at Beeswing, run by the Camphill Village Trust, is a working farm with dairy, gardens and supported accommodation where people with learning disabilities live alongside volunteers in a way that "recognises the dignity and uniqueness of each human being and does not distinguish between those who are called disabled and those who are not".
