= List of works influenced by One Thousand and One Nights =

The Middle Eastern story collection One Thousand and One Nights — known in English as The Arabian Nights — has had a profound impact on culture around the world.

== Literature ==
The influence of the versions of The Nights on world literature is immense. Writers as diverse as Henry Fielding and Naguib Mahfouz have alluded to the work by name in their own literature. Other writers who have been influenced by The Nights include John Barth, Jorge Luis Borges, Salman Rushdie, Goethe, Walter Scott, Letitia Elizabeth Landon, Thackeray, Wilkie Collins, Elizabeth Gaskell, Nodier, Flaubert, Marcel Schwob, Stendhal, Dumas, Gérard de Nerval, Gobineau, Pushkin, Tolstoy, Hofmannsthal, Conan Doyle, W. B. Yeats, H. G. Wells, Cavafy, Calvino, Georges Perec, H. P. Lovecraft, Marcel Proust, A. S. Byatt, Rudyard Kipling and Angela Carter.

This work has been influential in the West since it was translated in the 18th century, first by Antoine Galland. Many imitations were written, especially in France. Various characters from this epic have themselves become cultural icons in Western culture, such as Aladdin, Sinbad and Ali Baba. Part of its popularity may have sprung from the increasing historical and geographical knowledge, so that places of which little was known and so marvels were plausible had to be set further "long ago" or farther "far away"; this is a process that continues, and finally culminate in the fantasy world having little connection, if any, to actual times and places. Several elements from Arabian mythology and Persian mythology are now common in modern fantasy, such as genies, magic carpets, magic lamps, etc. When L. Frank Baum proposed writing a modern fairy tale that banished stereotypical elements, he included the genie as well as the dwarf and the fairy as stereotypes to go.

=== 18th century ===
- Candide, ou l'optimisme (Candide, or Optimism; 1758) by Voltaire, contains a number of references to the story of Sindbâd the Seaman, notably the underground river in Eldorado, where in Candide the heroes are picked up by a machine. In his introduction to Zadig, Voltaire wrote (NB the sultan referred to is Ulugh Beg in English transcription):

The story was first written in Chaldean, which neither you nor I understand. Later it was translated into Arabic to amuse the famous Sultan Ouloug Beg, at the same time that the Arabs and Persians were beginning to write the Thousand-and-one-Nights, the Thousand-and-one-Days etc. Ouloug Beg preferred Zadig, but the Sultanas liked the Thousand-and-One more. 'How is it possible,' said the wise Ouloug, 'that you prefer tales which have neither sense nor reason?' 'That is just why we like them so much,' replied the Sultanas.

Further references to the Arabian Nights are expressed in parallels with the stories of Khudâdâd and His Brothers, 'Alâ' al-Dîn, and the History of the Princess of Daryâbâr. Whereas the Arabian Nights focuses on the narrative themes of providence and destiny, Voltaire substituted the interference of divine power with human intervention.

- Nourjahad (1767), moral tale by Frances Sheridan.
- Vathek (1786) by William Beckford. Oriental fantasy which strongly influenced the Gothic novel.
- One Thousand and One Nights influenced The Manuscript Found in Saragossa, by Jan Potocki. A Polish noble of the late 18th century, he travelled the Orient looking for an original edition of The Nights, but never found it. Upon returning to Europe, he wrote his masterpiece, a multi-levelled frame tale.

=== 19th century ===
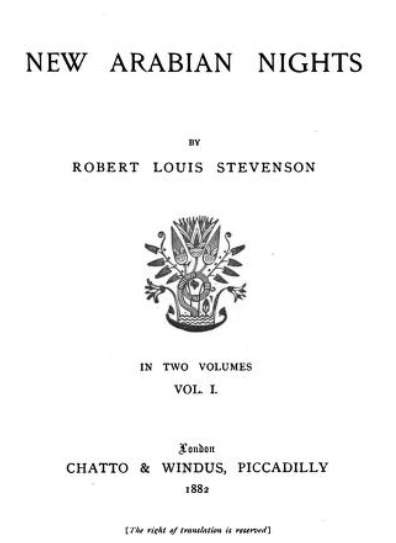
New Arabian Nights (1882) by Robert Louis Stevenson

- The Nights has also inspired poetry in English, e.g. Alfred Tennyson’s poem, "Recollections of the Arabian Nights" (1830). William Wordsworth refers to his childhood reading of the stories in ’’The Prelude’’ (1805).
- The Count of Monte Cristo by Alexandre Dumas includes a scene where Edmund Dantès Adopts the pseudonym Sinbad the Sailor (1844).
- Edgar Allan Poe wrote a "Thousand and Second Night" as a separate tale, called "The Thousand and Second Tale of Scheherazade" (1845).
- New Arabian Nights (1882) is a collection of stories by Robert Louis Stevenson.

=== 20th century ===
- In L. Frank Baum's John Dough and the Cherub (1906), the two heroes, Chick the Cherub, a child of unknown gender and John Dough, a man made out of gingerbread, flying from Ali Dubh, reach many fabulous lands. In the chapter titled "The Palace of Romance", Chick has to weave an unending story about a Silver Pig with marvellous powers. Should he ever run out of story to tell, he and John Dough would be cast into the ocean to drown, this being the custom of the people in dealing with visitors who cannot entertain them.
- The Nights are referenced explicitly in several Jorge Luis Borges stories: “Tlön, Uqbar, Orbis Tertius”, “The Garden of Forking Paths”, “The Zahir”, “The Man on the Threshold”, “Brodie’s Report” and “The Book of Sand.” Other stories allude to particular tales from the Nights.
- A heroic fantasy novel written by L. Ron Hubbard, Slaves of Sleep (serial: 1939, book: 1948), presents a story in which a man travels to a parallel universe ruled by Arabian Nights Ifrits. A sequel, The Masters of Sleep (1950), was also published.
- The horse in, and protagonist of, Robert Lawson's 1953 children's historical novel, Mr. Revere and I: Being an Account of certain Episodes in the Career of Paul Revere, Esq. as Revealed by his Horse, is named Scheherazade (nicknamed "Sherry").
- Iznogoud (1962), a French comics series by René Goscinny and Jean Tabary, takes place in a parody setting of The Nights. Its stories revolve around the eponymous character's failed attempts to usurp caliph Haroun El Poussah (a pun on Harun al-Rashid).
- In Salman Rushdie's Midnight's Children (1981), the narrator repeatedly compares his own tales of his life to Scheherazade's, and mentions that he can't "count on having even a thousand nights and a night" (page 4) in which to tell them. Rushdie also makes references to the tales in Haroun and the Sea of Stories, including the names of the main characters.
- John Barth has alluded to the Nights or referenced it explicitly in many of his works, such as The Last Voyage of Somebody the Sailor (1991). Scheherazade appears as a character in The Tidewater Tales (1987). In addition, the "Dunyazadiad", one of a set of three novellas that make up Barth's fictional work Chimera (1972), is a re-telling of the Scheherazade framing story in which the author appears to Scheherazade from the future and recounts stories from the 1001 Nights to her in order to provide her with material with which to forestall her execution.
- Ramadan (1993), issue 50 of Neil Gaiman's acclaimed comic book series The Sandman, draws on several of the stories of The Nights. In this tale, the Caliph Harun al-Rashid (who is a protagonist in many of the Nights) sells the "golden age of Baghdad" to the Prince of Stories, in order that it never be forgotten. It is implied that the Thousand and One Nights is part of the result of that bargain.
- Two notable novels loosely based on The Nights are Arabian Nights and Days by Naguib Mahfouz and When Dreams Travel by Githa Hariharan. The children's novel The Storyteller's Daughter by Cameron Dokey is also loosely derived from The Nights.
- Larry Niven, a Science Fiction & Fantasy author, wrote The Tale of the Jenni and the Sisters. It supposedly told another tale by Scheherazade, and appeared in his short story collection N-Space (short story collection) (1990).
- Craig Shaw Gardner wrote a trilogy: The Other Sinbad (1990), A Bad Day for Ali Baba (1991) and Scheherazade's Night Out in 1992.
- A.S. Byatt: The Djinn in the Nightingale's Eye (short story, 1994)
- In Stephen King's Misery, the protagonist is forced to write a novel under threat of death or dismemberment at the hands of a crazed fan. On several occasions throughout the story, he compares his situation to Scheherazade's. Also, the novel describes the main antagonist (Annie Wilkes) as Scheherazade.
- In Thomas Pynchon's Mason & Dixon (1997), narrator Rev. Wicks Cherrycoke must tell his extended family an entertaining story in order to remain a guest at their home, a predicament similar to Scheherazade's.
- Kannitheevu (Virgin Island) is a long-running Indian Tamil-language newspaper comic-strip in Dina Thanthi. It debuted in 1960 with stories from the Arabian Nights, the initial one focusing on Sindbad, when he rescues young women captured by an evil magician on the "Virgin Island".
- Arabya Rajani’r Golpo, an Indian comics series adaptation by Amar Majumdar of the Arabian Nights was published in the Bengali-language children's magazine Kishore Bharati, by Dinesh Chandra Chattopadhyay.
- Various stories from the collection ran as monthly comics in the Indian children's magazine Chandamama.

=== 21st century ===
- DC Comics' 2001 Elseworlds graphic novel Green Lantern: 1001 Emerald Nights is based on the Nights.
- Richard Siken’s 2004 poetry book Crush begins with a poem titled "Scheherazade".
- Bill Willingham, creator of the comic book series Fables, used the story of The Nights as the basis of a prequel, 1001 Nights of Snowfall (2006). In the book, Snow White tells the tales of the Fables, magical literary characters, to the sultan in order to avoid her impending death.
- Ted Chiang's 2007 novelette The Merchant and the Alchemist's Gate is a science-fiction pastiche of the Nights that uses its premise to drive a similar nesting structure of stories.
- David Foster's 2009 novel Sons of the Rumour is a pastiche of the Nights.
- P. B. Kerr's "Children of the Lamp" series draws many elements from the Nights.
- Benjamin Buchholz's 2011 novel One Hundred and One Nights uses the frame of Scheherazade's storytelling technique to narrate a tale about the village of Safwan, Iraq during the most recent American war.
- Code Name Verity is a 2012 novel by Elizabeth Wein whose main character is occasionally called Scheherazade. She is a Scottish spy who was captured by the SS in occupied France, and is writing down her story and war time secrets to spare herself torture.
- The Oath of the Vayuputras is a 2013 novel by Amish Tripathi that has a Parihan character named Scheherazade.
- Two Years Eight Months and Twenty-Eight Nights, a 2015 novel by Salman Rushdie.
- Shadow Spinner is a retelling of the story by Susan Fletcher illustrated by Dave Kramer, where a young girl, Marjan, rescues the fabled Shahrazad from the Sultan's wrath.
- The Wrath & the Dawn and The Rose & the Dagger, reimaginings of the story by Renee Ahdieh.
- Ghost Quartet, a song cycle by composer Dave Malloy, incorporates elements of Scheherazade's narration and her relationship to the Sultan.
- In Nikita Gill's 2018 poetry collection "Fierce Fairytales: & Other Stories to Stir Your Soul" she has a poem entitled "Scheherazade the Clever."
- Robert Shearman's short story collection We All Hear Stories in the Dark is heavily inspired by the Nights and has been described as a postmodern take on them.
- Jeanette Winterson's One Aladdin Two Lamps is a retelling of the Nights—specifically focusing on the tale of Aladdin—enquiring into contemporary debates surrounding storytelling, genetics, climate crisis, wealth inequality etc.
- Guillermo Stitch's 2026 novel, The Coast of Everything, a recursive Möbius strip of tales in which Scheherazade is either a character or the narrator, or both.

=== Japanese literature ===
The Nights also had an influence on modern Japanese literature. George Fyler Townsend's revised edition of the Arabian Nights was the first "European" literary work to be translated into the Japanese language during the Meiji era, by Nagamine Hideki in 1875. The Japanese translation was entitled Arabiya Monogatari ("Arabian Stories" or literally "Stormy Night Stories"), as part of the monogatari genre. Though the book was intriguing to Japanese readers, who at that time had very little knowledge of Arabic culture or the Middle East in general, the Nights did not gain popularity in Japan until a more Japanified translation, entitled Zensekai Ichidai Kisho (The Most Curious Book in the Whole World), was produced by Inoue Tsutomu in 1888. His translation exerted a great influence on the literature of the Meiji, Taishō and Shōwa periods, with writers and poets such as Hinatsu Kōnosuke, Hakushū Kitahara and Mokutaro Kinoshita citing the work as an influence on their own works. In the early 20th century, other translations from the Lane and Burton editions were also published, including ones from the Lane edition by Kōnosuke and Morita Sōhei, as well a translation of the Andrew Lang edition by Daisui Sugitani, and translations of individual tales by Iwaya Sazanami. In Norwegian Wood, written by Haruki Murakami in 1987, Toru refers to Reiko as a regular Scheherazade when she leaves a story about her past unfinished. Moreover, Murakami wrote a short story entitled "Scheherazade", published in The New Yorker in October 2014 and previously compiled in his short story collection Men Without Women, published in April 2014.

Magi: The Labyrinth of Magic is a Japanese fantasy manga written by Shinobu Ohtaka which borrows several elements from the Nights. Each of the three protagonists, Aladdin, Alibaba and Morgiana have several traits in common with their counterparts from the original, with the same occurring with other characters like Sinbad, Cassim and Scheherazade. First released in 2009, it was adapted into an anime series in 2012.

== Drama ==
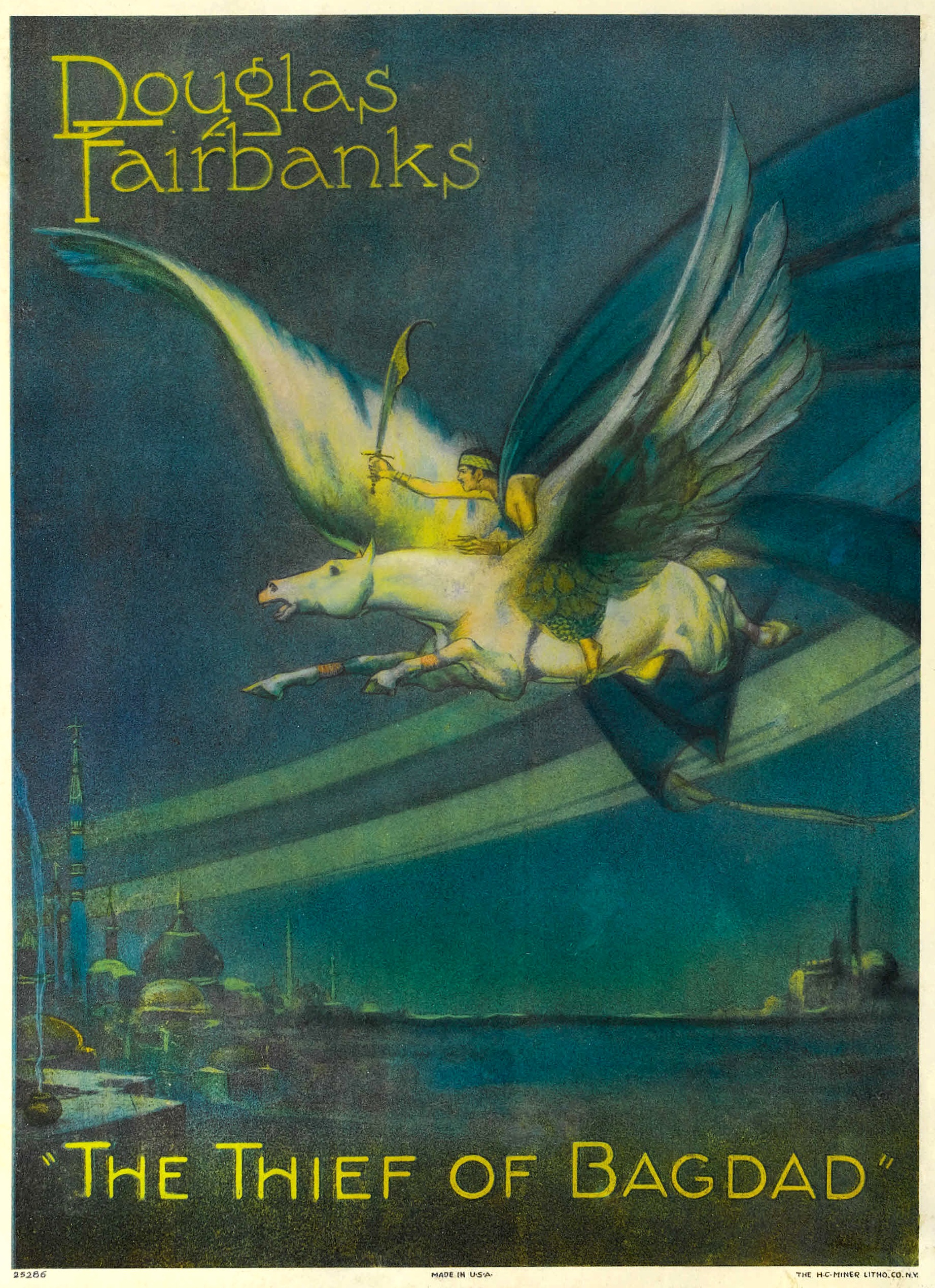
The Thief of Baghdad (1924)

There have been many adaptations of The Nights for television, cinema and radio.

The atmosphere of The Nights influenced such films as Fritz Lang's 1921 Der müde Tod, the 1924 Hollywood film The Thief of Baghdad starring Douglas Fairbanks, and its 1940 British remake. Several stories served as source material for The Adventures of Prince Achmed (1926), the oldest surviving feature-length animated film.

In the late 1930s, Fleischer Studios produced three two-reel animated Popeye cartoons in colour for Paramount Pictures. All three cartoons, known also as the Popeye Color Specials (or Features), were adapted from The Nights: Popeye the Sailor Meets Sindbad the Sailor, Popeye the Sailor Meets Ali Baba's Forty Thieves, and Aladdin and His Wonderful Lamp.

One of Hollywood's first feature films to be based on The Nights was in 1942, with the movie called Arabian Nights. It starred Maria Montez as Scheherazade, Sabu Dastagir as Ali Ben Ali and Jon Hall as Harun al-Rashid. The storyline bears virtually no resemblance to the traditional version of the book. In the film, Scheherazade is a dancer who attempts to overthrow Caliph Harun al-Rashid and marry his brother. After Scheherazade's initial coup attempt fails and she is sold into slavery, many adventures then ensue. Maria Montez and Jon Hall also starred in the 1944 film Ali Baba and the Forty Thieves.

Columbia Pictures released A Thousand and One Nights, starring Cornel Wilde as Aladdin, in 1945.

In the 1952 Universal Pictures movie The Golden Blade, Harun al-Rashid (Rock Hudson) uses a magical sword that makes him invincible to free Baghdad from the evil vizier Jafar and his son Hadi and win the love of the beautiful princess Khairuzan (Piper Laurie).

The 1955 RKO Pictures film Son of Sinbad combines the Sinbad character with Ali Baba's Forty Thieves (who in this film are all female).

The 1958 movie The 7th Voyage of Sinbad was a Sinbad film produced by the stop-motion animation pioneer Ray Harryhausen. Harryhausen also provided the stop-motion effects for The Golden Voyage of Sinbad (1974) and Sinbad and the Eye of the Tiger (1977).

In 1959, Columbia Pictures released a UPA-produced animated feature starring Mr. Magoo, entitled 1001 Arabian Nights.

Osamu Tezuka worked on two (very loose) feature film adaptations, the children's film Sinbad no Bōken in 1962 and Senya Ichiya Monogatari in 1969, an adult-oriented animated feature film.

Hanna-Barbera had created Shazzan, a powerful genie that comes from a ring in 1967 and the next year premiered a segment on The Banana Splits Show called Arabian Knights, a team of heroes saving their lands from an evil emperor.

In 1982, an X-rated adaptation entitled “A Thousand And One Erotic Nights” was produced, starring Annette Haven as “Scheherezade”.

The most commercially successful movie based on The Nights was Aladdin, the 1992 animated movie by the Walt Disney Company, which starred the voices of Scott Weinger and Robin Williams. The film led to several sequels and a television series of the same name. Scheherazade and her "thousand tales" are referred to in the song "Friend Like Me".

A French animated television series, Princesse Shéhérazade, was originally broadcast from 1996 until 1999.

"The Voyages of Sinbad" has been adapted for television and film several times, most recently in the 2003 animated feature Sinbad: Legend of the Seven Seas, featuring the voices of Brad Pitt and Catherine Zeta-Jones.

A recent well-received television adaptation was the Emmy Award-winning miniseries Arabian Nights, directed by Steve Barron and starring Mili Avital as Scheherazade and Dougray Scott as Shahryar. It was originally shown over two nights on April 30, and May 1, 2000, on ABC in the United States and BBC One in the United Kingdom.

In 2001, the Radio Tales series produced a trilogy of dramas adapted from the Arabian Nights, including the stories of Aladdin, Ali Baba, and Sindbad.

Other versions of The Nights include the 1974 Italian movie Il fiore delle mille e una notte by Pier Paolo Pasolini and the 1990 French movie Les 1001 nuits, in which Catherine Zeta-Jones made her debut playing Scheherazade.

There are numerous Bollywood movies inspired by the book, including Aladdin and Sinbad. In this version the two heroes meet and share in each other's adventures; the djinn of the lamp is female, and Aladdin marries her rather than the princess. Other Indian films inspired by the book, include Allauddinum Albhutha Vilakkum (1979; Malayalam), Allaudinaum Arputha Vilakkum (1979; Tamil) and Daya (1998; Malayalam).

The Turkish television series Binbir Gece (Thousand and one nights) is a modern re-telling of the book. It is about an architect named Şehrazat (Scheherazade) who spends a night with her boss for a money to pay for her son's expensive surgery.

In 2009, the BBC Radio 7 science fiction series Planet B featured an episode set in a virtual world which had merged The Nights with a wargame.

Alif Laila is an Indian TV series based on the stories from The Arabian Nights. It was produced by Sagar Films (Pvt. Ltd.) and aired on DD National.

In the episode "Stan of Arabia (Part II)" of American Dad!, Roger distracts a wealthy sheik with stories from American soap operas to delay consummating their marriage.

Bugs Bunny portrayed a Scheherazade-like character in Bugs Bunny's 3rd Movie: 1001 Rabbit Tales. Bugs must entertain Sultan Yosemite Sam and his son Prince Abba-Dabba with story after story or else be subject to beheading.

In the third-season episode "The Scheherazade Job" of the TNT series Leverage, Hardison (the "Hacker") has to play the violin solo in a live performance of Scheherazade in order for the crew to successfully rob the story's villain. Ironically, the crew is so captivated by Hardison's playing of the solo in the fourth movement that they stop still during the robbery to listen. While discussing Scheherazade, Sophie says she was the first "grifter", being able to make the king fail to keep his murderous vow and then to make him fall for her.

The Japanese animated film Sinbad: Sora Tobu Hime to Himitsu no Shima is inspired by Arabian Nights.

Sherazade, the untold stories, is a CGI cartoon TV series for children started in 2017.

In season 9, episode 8 of the Cartoon Network series Adventure Time (Elements Part 7: Hero Heart) Ice King and Betty run into Lumpy Space Princess while riding on a magic carpet. Ice King greets her by saying "Check it out, LSP! It's a real, magic, flying carpet! I feel just like Scheherazade."

In 2018, Audible commissioned the retelling of the Scheherazade and Ali Baba stories in an eight-part radio drama penned by Marty Ross and performed by Wireless Theatre Company.

Scheherezade is portrayed by Meredith Stepien in the 2013 Starkid musical Twisted: The Untold Story of a Royal Vizier (a parody of Disney's 1992 animated feature, Aladdin, with strong influences from the musical Wicked).

Arabbya Rajani (Arabian Nights) is an Indian Bengali-language drama television show. An adaptation of various tales from the collection, it aired on Colors Bangla in 2019.

== Music ==
=== Classical ===
- In 1888, the Russian composer Nikolai Rimsky-Korsakov completed his Op. 35 Scheherazade, in four movements, based upon four of the tales from The Nights: "The Sea and Sinbad's Ship", "The Kalendar Prince", "The Young Prince and The Young Princess", and "Festival at Baghdad".
- Shéhérazade (1902) is a set of three poems for voice and orchestra by the French composer Maurice Ravel.
- The final movement of Ferrucio Busoni's Piano Concerto (1904) includes a setting of part of Adam Oehlenschläger's verse drama Aladdin for male voice choir.
- Carl Nielsen created his Aladdin Suite (1918–1919) from incidental music he composed for a revival of Oehlenschläger's 1805 play Aladdin.
- 1990 saw the premiere of La Noche de las Noches, a work for string quartet and electronics by Ezequiel Viñao (based on a reading from Burton's "Book of the Thousand Nights and a Night").
- John Adams's 2014 "dramatic symphony" and concerto for violin, Scheherazade.2 imagines a modern and more heroic female lead.

=== Opera ===
- François-Adrien Boieldieu: Le calife de Bagdad (1800)
- Carl Maria von Weber: Abu Hassan (1811)
- Luigi Cherubini: Ali Baba (1833)
- Peter Cornelius: Der Barbier von Bagdad (1858)
- Ernest Reyer: La statue (1861)
- Henri Rabaud: Mârouf, savetier du Caire (1914)

=== Popular ===
- There have been several Arabian Nights musicals and operettas, either based on particular tales or drawing on the general atmosphere of the book including Chu Chin Chow (1916) and Kismet (1953), not to mention several musicals and innumerable pantomimes on the story of "Aladdin."
- In 1975, the band Renaissance released an album called Scheherazade and Other Stories. The second half of this album consists entirely of the "Song of Scheherazade", an orchestral-rock composition based on The Nights. A live, 29-minute version of the piece, called simply "Scheherazade", was included in their 1976 release, Live at Carnegie Hall.
- At some point in his career, Isao Tomito created a variation of Scheherazade using synthesizers.
- The 1986 song "Rhymin' and Stealin'" by rap group the Beastie Boys makes reference to the story of Ali Baba and the Forty Thieves.
- The 1991 song "Şehrezat" by famous Turkish songwriter and singer Barış Manço is strongly based on Scheherazade (Rimsky-Korsakov) with an extended part of original lyrics.
- In the song "Scheherazade", on his 1988 album One More Story, Peter Cetera refers to the One Thousand and One Nights tale, the song features backup-vocals by Madonna.
- Kamelot's song "Nights of Arabia" from the 1999 album The Fourth Legacy describes the story of Scheherazade.
- Caroline Lavelle included a song called "Sheherazade" on her 1995 album Spirit.
- Sparks featured a song titled "Scheherazade" on their 2000 album Balls, from the point of view of the King.
- The song "One Thousand and One Nights" by J-pop band See-Saw, used as the opening theme song for the second part of the four-part OVA .hack//Liminality ("In the Case of Yuki Aihara"), references The Nights in both the title and the lyrics.
- In 2003, Nordic experimental indie pop group When released an album called Pearl Harvest with lyrics from The Nights.
- In 2004, psychedelic trance group 1200 Micrograms released song called "1001 Arabian Nights" on The Time Machine album.
- In 2004, the Santa Clara Vanguard performed "Scheherazade" for their Drum Corps International show.
- In 2007, Japanese pop duo Bennie K released a single titled "1001 Nights", also releasing a music video strongly based on The Nights.
- In 2007, the Finnish Symphonic metal band Nightwish wrote a song "Sahara" on their album Dark Passion Play which relates to the 1001 Nights stories.
- In 2008, New Age artist Al Conti released his album Scheherazade.
- 2008 saw the birth of Australian metalcore band, Ebony Horse, named after the tale "The Ebony Horse."
- The Dutch music group Ch!pz has also released a song called "1001 Arabian Nights" and also has a film clip to go along with it which illustrates one of the stories.
- Mexican female music group Flans released a song called "Las Mil y una Noches" (One Thousand and One Nights)
- "Scheherazade" is a song by Panda Bear, from the 2011 album Tomboy.
- On In Once Upon A Time (In Space), an album by The Mechanisms, there is a song "The Resistance Grows", in which Scheherazade is the Emperor's "Silver tongued propaganda minister".
- The steampunk band Abney Park released a song titled "Scheherazade" in their 2013 album, The Circus At the End of the World.
- In 2014, the Santa Clara Vanguard performed "Scheherazade" once again for their Drum Corps International show.
- In 2015, Jason Kouchak performed Scheherazade at the Emirates Airline Festival of Literature.
- In 2016, the American alternative country band Freakwater released their 10th album, Scheherazade, on Bloodshot Records.
- In 2016, Bei Ru released a song titled "Dinner With Scheherazade/Interstellar Glamour Life" on his 2016 album L.A. Zooo.

== Sculpture and visual arts ==
- In Iraq, from the time the Hashemite monarchy was overthrown (in 1969), Iraqi artists searched for a visual language that would reference their deep artistic and literary heritage. A number of sculptures by sculptor Mohammed Ghani Hikmat, now dotted around the city of Baghdad, were inspired by stories from One Thousand and One Nights. These include statues of Sinbad, the sailor; Ali Baba and the Forty Thieves; Kahramana Fountain featuring Morgiana pouring hot oil on the thieves hidden in jars; Shahriyar and Scheherazade; Flying Carpets and the Magic Lantern.
- Opa-locka, a city located in Miami-Dade County, Florida and developed in 1926 by aviator Glenn Curtiss, is conceived based on a One Thousand and One Nights theme. It has the largest collection of Moorish Revival architecture in the Western Hemisphere, and streets with such names as Sharazad Boulevard, Sinbad Avenue, Ali Baba Avenue and Sesame Street.

=== Other ===
- The story of Ali Baba and the Forty Thieves, an 18th-century addition to The 1001 Nights, has itself been widely adapted.

== Games ==
- The tales of Sheherazade were a major source for the creation of Al-Qadim, an Arabian Nights–themed campaign setting for the Dungeons & Dragons role-playing game. The setting was developed by Jeff Grubb for TSR, Inc., and was first released in 1992. Al-Qadim is set in Zakhara (called the Land of Fate), a blend of the historical Arabian Empire, the stories of legend, and a wealth of Hollywood cinematic history.
- The first expansion set for Magic: The Gathering was "Arabian Nights", containing cards based on and inspired by One Thousand and One Nights. This included a card called "Shahrazad" which required the two players to play a separate game within the current game. This was often followed by another Shahrazad being played within that subgame, resulting in "1,001 games" of Magic. It is because of this, and the time it takes, that the card is banned in all sanctioned tournament formats.
- Jordan Mechner stated that The Nights was an inspiration for his popular Prince of Persia series.
- Tales of the Arabian Nights is a paragraph-based story-telling board game first produced by West End Games in 1985. A second edition was published by Edition Erlkönig in 1999, and a third edition by Z-Man Games was reissued July 2009.
- The Magic of Scheherazade, a 1989 game produced by the Japanese company Culture Brain for the Nintendo Entertainment System, takes its title from the female protagonist of the Arabian Nights and includes many of the typical trappings of Arabian Nights tales, but has little, if any, direct connection to the tales.
- The setting of the 1990 EGA PC adventure game Quest for Glory II: Trial by Fire is based on The Nights.
- In 1993 Krisalis developed an Amiga platform game called Arabian Nights with the main character being Sinbad aiming to rescue the princess.
- In 2001 Silmarils developed a Windows action-adventure game called Arabian Nights where player character Ali rescues the Sultan's five daughters.
- One Thousand and One Nights is the basis for the story of the video game Sonic and the Secret Rings. In the story, Sonic the Hedgehog is pulled into the story by Shahra The Ring Genie in order to save the Arabian Nights which is being erased by the main villain Erazor Djinn. Other recurring Sonic characters turn up as characters from the One Thousand and One Nights, such as Tails as Ali Baba, Knuckles as Sinbad, and Doctor Eggman as King Shahryār. “Shahra” is the Japanese nickname for Scheherazade and Shahra is most likely based on Scheherazade. At the end of the story, Shahra even used Scheherazade's regular 'that is a story for another time' line, to refer the continuing story of Sonic, Ali Baba and Sinbad.
- "Scheherazade" is the name of an unlockable bonus character in Soulcalibur IV. In battle she (using the same style as Amy) wields a rapier named "Alf Layla Wa Layla", the Arabic name meaning "One Thousand and One Nights". She is the mid-boss for Ashlotte, Hilde, Nightmare, Siegfried, Yoda, and Yoshimitsu.
- "Scheherazade" is also in the Korean MMORPG, Atlantica Online, as a side quest character near the Hanging Gardens of Babylon dungeon.
- Tales of the Arabian Nights is a pinball machine by Williams.
- Scherazard Harvey of the Trails series is named after Scherazard of One Thousand and One Nights and dressed in an Arabian-style outfit.
- "Scheherazade" is a program card available to the Hacker players in Android: Netrunner. The art is inspired by One Thousand and One Nights and the flavour text makes reference to the number as well.
- Scheherazade is a prominent character in the Force of Will trading card game with multiple cards named after her; "Scheherazade, the Teller of 1001 Stories", "Scheherazade. the Teller of the Crimson Moon" and "Stories Told in 1001 Nights".
- Scheherazade is a playable Caster-class Servant in Fate/Grand Order. Her Noble Phantasm is named Alf Layla Wa-Layla, the Arabic title of One Thousand and One Nights.
- Scheherazade is a playable character in Grimms Notes.
- Scheherazade is a playable character in Volition's Agents of Mayhem. She is a Middle-Eastern woman (the specific country is unspecified) who loves story-telling and keeps her true identity a secret (unlike the rest of the playable cast and most of the game's characters). She is trained in stealth and subterfuge, is considered a "ninja" due to favouring a scimitar over guns and other projectile weapons, and possesses an amulet that can alter or repair reality.
- Scheherazade is an obtainable 6 Star, Light-affinity character card in the mobile game Legendary: Game of Heroes, depicted as an armoured Middle-Eastern woman, carrying a fauchard and riding the back of an armoured tiger. She also falls under the character classifications Warrior, Fable, and Commander.
- Scheherazade is a character in the Poptropica island "Arabian Nights", where she is the leader of the Forty Thieves.
- Genshin Impact contains a character called Dunyarzad, named after Scheherazade's younger sister.
