= Coming Soon =

Coming Soon may refer to:

== Film and television ==
- Coming Soon (1982 film), an American documentary directed by John Landis
- Coming Soon (1999 film), an American romantic comedy directed by Colette Burson
- Coming Soon (1999 TV film), a film directed by Annie Griffin
- Coming Soon (2008 film), a Thai horror film directed by Sophon Sakdapisit
- Coming Soon (2014 film), Turkish comedy directed by Cem Yılmaz
- "Coming Soon" (Medium), a 2005 TV episode
- Coming Soon Television, a defunct Italian TV channel

== Music ==
- Coming Soon (French band), an indie band formed in 2005
- Coming Soon (Latvian band), a 2005–2009 rock band
- "Coming Soon", a 1980 song by Queen from The Game

== Other uses ==
- Coming Soon!!!, a 2001 novel by John Barth
- ComingSoon.net, an entertainment website owned by Mandatory
