= La Mémoire maritime des arabes =

- Directed by: Khal Torabully
- Screenplay by: Khal Torabully
- Produced by: Chamarel Films, Productions La Lanterne
- Cinematography: Philippe Fivet
- Edited by: Roland Sapin
- Music by: Leo Morfun
- Release date: 2000
- Running time: 53 minutes
- Countries: France; Mauritius

La Mémoire maritime des arabes is a 2000 documentary film.

== Synopsis ==
Even before Islam existed, the Arabs were sailing the seas. The sea and its activities were extremely important for these desert people in the 7th century, when they traveled from Spain to China skirting the African coast. Sinbad’s stories are based on those journeys, but reality may well surpass fiction. How does one change from a dromedary to a ship? Their knowledge of astronomy, commerce and science form part of this film shot in twelve countries that covers several centuries and includes the opinion of eminent experts.

== Awards ==
- ZIFF 2001
- Golden Award for best documentary, Arab Media Film Festival, Cairo, 2010
