= Carol Houlihan Flynn =

American literary critic (born 1945)

- Born: July 29, 1945; Chicago
- Died: March 16, 2023 (aged 77); Topsham, Maine
- Education: University of Illinois at Urbana–Champaign (B.A., 1967); Brown University (M.A.); University of California at Berkeley (Ph.D.)
- Occupations: writer literary critic
- Notable work: Samuel Richardson, a Man of Letters; The Body in Swift and Defoe; Washed in the Blood; The Animals
- Spouse: David Tarbet
- Children: 2

Carol Houlihan Flynn

(born in Chicago in 1945) was an American academic, literary critic, and writer of fiction. A professor emerita at Tufts University, Flynn was previously on the faculty of New York University and Princeton University. She is the author of Samuel Richardson, a Man of Letters; The Body in Swift and Defoe; a noir mystery, Washed in the Blood; and a memoir, The Animals, among other works. She was co-creator of the Somerville Conversations, a project designed to encourage dialogue between diverse members of the community.

== Academic life ==
Flynn graduated with B.A. in English from the University of Illinois at Urbana–Champaign in 1967. In 1969, she earned an M.A. from Brown University as a Woodrow Wilson Fellow in American Civilization, writing her thesis on the novels of John Barth.

She earned her Ph.D. in English at the University of California at Berkeley in 1974. Concentrating on 18th-century English literature, she wrote her dissertation on the novels of Samuel Richardson: "So Strangely Mixed: Morals and Aesthetics in the works of Samuel Richardson." Working in London between 1975 and 1978, she explored the historical background of Richardson's work and related feminist theory. She became assistant professor at New York University in 1979 and was tenured there in 1985. That same year she accepted tenure as an associate professor in the English Department at Tufts University.

While at Tufts, Flynn served as director of the graduate program in the English Department, chaired the university's Tenure and Promotion Committee, and was a member of the university's executive committee, where she worked toward faculty governance. She taught in the World Civilizations Program, chaired both the American Studies and Women's Studies programs, and co-chaired the Center for Interdisciplinary Studies.

While teaching her interdisciplinary course, "Mapping London," she worked with the Tufts Library to produce the electronic Bolles Collection on the History of London.

Flynn also taught “Girls’ Books” at Tufts, a course that focused on literature and etiquette handbooks for girls from the 19th to mid-twentieth century. Her collection of girls’ books, which she donated to Tufts on her retirement, can be accessed at Tufts’ Tisch Library.

In 1992, she was a visiting professor at Princeton University.

== Writing ==
Flynn's academic writing, including many articles and books, often has an interdisciplinary focus. Samuel Richardson, a Man of Letters (Princeton, 1982) looks at the historical records of rape trials and forced marriages, while The Body in Swift and Defoe (Cambridge, 1990) studies the ways that the gendered and all-too-material body figures in urban and economic discourse. Whether writing about eighteenth-century prostitution, the physical and psychological magnitude of the Gordon Riots, or the eighteenth century practice of applying physical exercises to cure madness, she actively pursues the connections between eighteenth-century belief systems and material culture.

Her non-academic writing includes the noir mystery, Washed in the Blood, and a memoir, The Animals, which examines the fortunes and misfortunes of the many animals her family raised: chickens and ducks, rabbits and goats, pigs and hamsters, too many cats, two Akita's, and one hyperactive Border Collie. Flynn and her husband, David Tarbet, have written a travel essay about two journeys to Corsica: James Boswell's in 1765 and their own in 2010.

== Activism ==
During her undergraduate years at Illinois, Flynn became involved in the Vietnam antiwar movement, and took part in demonstrations supporting the W.E.B. Dubois Society. At Berkeley, she joined the women's movement and the antiwar movement, which turned into lifelong commitments. While in London, she worked at the Women's Research and Resources Centre, a feminist cooperative that encouraged scholarship and criticism for and about women. At Tufts University, she worked on progressive campaigns against the Iraq war and in continuing support of custodian grievances. Representing the Tufts Center for Interdisciplinary Studies (CIS), Flynn and Saul Slapikoff worked with representatives from Somerville to create The Somerville Conversations. The Conversations fostered dialogue within the community between "old" and "new" immigrants. Originally supported by the National Endowment for the Humanities in 1996, they became an important part of Somerville's civic agenda.

== Personal life ==
Flynn was married to David Tarbet, a former professor of 18th-century English literature and later, a writer and a lawyer in Boston, for 26 years. Together, they have four children and eight grandchildren. Flynn died on March 16, 2023, in Topsham, Maine.
