= Every Third Thought =

2011 novel by John Barth

Every Third Thought: A Novel in Five Seasons is a novel by American writer John Barth, published in 2011.

The book is narrated by retired creative writing professor George Newett, who lives with his poet wife Amanda Todd. The couple are living in a cramped rental while deciding what to do after the destruction of their Heron Bay Estates home, as depicted in Barth's previous book, The Development. As the book opens, the two are planning a trip to Shakespeare's birthplace. George hits his head when they get there and experiences past memories as if they were present, each occurring on the first day of a new season, and each corresponding to a new "season" of George's life.

The novel's title is taken from the final scene of Shakespeare's final play, The Tempest. At the end of a speech in which he promises to renounce magic, Prospero says, "And thence retire me to my Milan, where / Every third thought shall be my grave." The line is about considering one's mortality near life's end, and Barth's title invokes this theme.
