= The Last Voyage of Somebody the Sailor =

1991 novel by John Barth

First edition

The Last Voyage of Somebody the Sailor is a novel by American writer John Barth, published in 1991. It is a postmodern metafictional story of a man who jumps overboard from a modern replica of a medieval Arab ship and is rescued by sailors from the world of Sinbad the Sailor. Eventually he makes his way to "Baghdad, the City of Peace", and finds himself in the stories of Sindbad and Scheherazade. The novel makes use of a challenging double-stranded narrative and a rich prose style.
