= Where Three Roads Meet =

Where Three Roads Meet is a book of three metafictional novellas by American writer John Barth, published in 2005. "Tell Me" tells of a love triangle between three "Freds": undergraduates Wilfred, Alfred, and Winifred. "I've Been Told: A Story's Story" is a highly metatextual story of a story telling itself. "As I Was Saying ..." is told from the point of view of three elderly sisters remembering how they had long ago inspired a novelist to produce a "once-notorious and controversial but now virtually forgotten masterwork".
