= Flame in the Mist =

2017 novel by Renee Ahdieh

- Author: Renée Ahdieh
- Language: English
- Subject: Young adult literature, Fairy tale
- Published: 2016 (Putnam)
- Publication place: USA
- Media type: Print (hardback, paperback)
- Pages: 392
- ISBN: 9780399171635
- OCLC: 956623297

Flame in the Mist is a 2017 young adult novel by Renee Ahdieh. It is a historical fantasy, based loosely on feudal Japan, about the betrothed daughter of a prominent samurai, Hattori, who having survived an assassination attempt disguises herself as a boy and infiltrates the clan responsible.

== Reception ==
The Horn Book Magazine, in a guide review of Flame in the Mist, wrote "Despite melodramatic prose and uneven world-building, this should appeal to fans of romantic YA fantasy." and the School Library Journal wrote "Ahdieh's strength lies in her intricate characterizations and detailed descriptions, all of which are perfectly showcased in feudal Japan."

Flame in the Mist has also been reviewed by Kirkus Reviews, Publishers Weekly (star review), Booklist, Voice of Youth Advocates, Common Sense Media, Romantic Times. and The Washington Post.
