= Sonic and the Secret Rings =

2007 video game

- North American cover art
- Developer: Sonic Team
- Publisher: Sega
- Director: Yojiro Ogawa
- Producer: Yojiro Ogawa
- Designer: Morio Kishimoto
- Programmer: Makiko Nishimura
- Artist: Yoshitaka Miura
- Writers: Yojiro Ogawa; Shiro Maekawa
- Composers: Fumie Kumatani; Kenichi Tokoi; Seirou Okamoto; Le Club Bachraf
- Series: Sonic the Hedgehog
- Platform: Wii
- Release: NA: February 20, 2007; EU: March 2, 2007; AU: March 8, 2007; JP: March 15, 2007
- Genre: Platform
- Modes: Single-player, multiplayer

Sonic and the Secret Rings (Note: Japanese: ソニックと秘密のリング, Hepburn: Sonikku to Himitsu no Ringu) is a 2007 platform game developed by Sonic Team and published by Sega for the Wii. A spin-off of the Sonic the Hedgehog series, it is the first title in the franchise for the system, and follows Sonic the Hedgehog's quest to stop an evil genie named Erazor Djinn. In addition to the basic platforming gameplay of previous Sonic titles, Secret Rings uses a system of experience points and levels, as well as special moves that are unlocked by means of progression.

The title was released in place of an aborted attempt to port the 2006 game Sonic the Hedgehog to the Wii. Producer, writer, and director Yojiro Ogawa conceived Secret Rings to tap into the Wii Remote's capabilities. He chose the theme of Arabian Nights, using many elements of the stories in the game's setting, characters, and Middle Eastern-influenced music. Sega changed the title of the game several times, originally being announced as Sonic Wild Fire, before settling on Sonic and the Secret Rings to tie in the theme of Arabian Nights.

Upon release, Secret Rings received mixed reviews. Reviewers praised its visual style and considered the game as a whole to be an improvement from prior entries, but were critical of its controls, which some claimed took time to get used to, and its inconsistent difficulty. Sega released a sequel in 2009, Sonic and the Black Knight; the two form what is known as the Sonic Storybook series. Sonic and the Secret Rings was de-listed from retailers in 2010, following Sega's decision to remove all Sonic titles with sub-average Metacritic scores in order to increase the value of the brand.

== Gameplay ==
Sonic runs through "Dinosaur Jungle", an early level of the game. A trail of pearls for the Soul Gauge lies in front of him. The ring counter and Soul Gauge are respectively shown at the top-left corner and right side of the screen.

Sonic and the Secret Rings is a three-dimensional platform and action game featuring an on-rails style of movement. Sonic the Hedgehog, the series' main character, is the game's only player character. He is controlled exclusively with the Wii Remote, which is held horizontally like a traditional gamepad. Players adjust his forward movement by tilting the controller. He runs along a predesignated path; players jump and brake using corresponding face buttons. Thrusting the Wii Remote forwards allows Sonic to perform a homing attack, a mid-air move that targets and damages enemies in his path.

Like in other games in the series, Sonic collects rings scattered throughout levels; contact with certain obstacles and enemies scatters them away, and Sonic dies if he touches an enemy without any rings. Unlike previous titles, Secret Rings does not feature a life counter or game over screen, but instead Sonic reappears at the last visited checkpoint after dying, although the player will have to restart a mission if they fail a specified objective. The game contains 110 missions (including boss battles) over the course of eight levels. New missions, cutscenes, and sometimes new levels are unlocked by completing missions. Successful missions earn Sonic experience points, which advance him levels.

Sonic has 104 special moves called "skills" that are unlocked upon leveling up or reaching certain points in the story. The player can distribute these skills to four "Skill Rings", which the player selects before starting a mission. Skills can provide Sonic with improved movement, offensive, and defensive capabilities, as well as special attacks. Skills are generally used by depleting the "Soul Gauge", which is slowly filled by collecting pearls scattered throughout the levels. Notable skills Sonic can obtain are the "Speed Break", which greatly increases his speed, and "Time Break" which slows down time, allowing the player to dodge obstacles more easily.

Secret Rings features three game modes: "Adventure", "Party", and "Special Book". The story is played in the Adventure mode. The Party mode features multiplayer gameplay for up to four players simultaneously, in which players spar in a turn-based tournament of motion control-based minigames. The "Special Book" mode displays the game's 225 unlockable bonuses, won by completing levels quickly and collecting "Fire Souls"—small fiery objects scattered throughout the levels. These bonuses are development documentaries, interviews, concept art, in-game cutscenes, and game music.

== Plot ==
=== Characters ===
Sonic is the game's protagonist, and his sidekick throughout the game is Shahra, "Genie of the Ring". Their enemy is Erazor Djinn, a genie who aspires to erase the entirety of the Arabian Nights book. He was once the Genie of the Lamp from the story of Aladdin and the Magic Lamp, who was punished for misdeeds and imprisoned in his lamp until he granted the wishes of one thousand people. Erazor did so, gaining a renewed hatred of humanity and deciding to take over the world. Several Sonic series characters appear in the form of figures from Arabian Nights, such as Miles "Tails" Prower as Ali Baba, Knuckles the Echidna as Sinbad the Sailor, and Doctor Eggman as Shahryār. Though Sonic recognizes them as old acquaintances, they do not recognize him, and Shahra insists that Sonic's perception is mistaken.

=== Story ===
After reading the Arabian Nights, Sonic falls asleep, only to be awoken by the Genie of the Ring, Shahra. She explains that Erazor Djinn is erasing the pages of the Arabian Nights and asks Sonic to help her, to which he agrees. He dons a ring that makes him Shahra's master and grants him the ability to ask for any wishes within her power; he then enters the book. Sonic and Shahra encounter Erazor inside; he tells them of his intent to search for seven artifacts called the World Rings, which Shahra claims do not exist. Erazor shoots an arrow of fire at Shahra, but Sonic takes it for her. Erazor opportunistically tells Sonic that he will remove the arrow if Sonic gathers the World Rings for him. If Sonic does not do so before the flame goes out, his "life is forfeit". Sonic and Shahra embark on a quest to retrieve the World Rings. Over the course of this quest, they learn that whoever collects the rings must be sacrificed to create a link between the Arabian Nights world and the real world, also that the rings themselves are sealed with different emotions. Elsewhere in the quest, Shahra gives Sonic Erazor's lamp to use as a last resort.

After Sonic manages to obtain the World Rings, Erazor convinces Shahra to give them to him. To try and keep them out of Erazor's hands, Sonic wishes for Shahra to do what she truly thinks is right, and she collapses on the ground as her mind cracks due to her conflicting emotions. Erazor attempts to sacrifice Sonic in order to open the gateway between worlds, but in a move of altruistic suicide, Shahra interrupts the attack, saving Sonic and asking for his forgiveness before dying in his arms. Without Sonic as the proper offering, Erazor mutates into the monstrous Alf Layla wa-Layla, now intent on remaking the Arabian Nights in his image before moving on to Sonic's world. Sonic absorbs the World Rings of Sadness, Rage, and Hatred - emotions he was feeling at the time - and transforms into Darkspine Sonic, a darker, more violent version of Super Sonic, granting him the power to defeat Alf Layla wa-Layla, but Erazor subsequently boasts that he is immortal and will always return. Sonic then reveals that he possesses Erazor's lamp, and wishes for Erazor to bring Shahra back to life, restore the book to its original state, and be trapped in his lamp for all eternity. Erazor refuses to do so, but is helpless against the power of his lamp. After granting the third wish, Erazor pleads for Shahra to stop Sonic and save him, but she refuses, leaving him to be sucked into his lamp. Shahra then bursts into tears, and Sonic wishes for a mountain of handkerchiefs to help her through her crying. Sonic then disposes of the lamp in a pit of lava, running through the book until he finds a way home. Shahra states that his story will be forever remembered in the pages of the Arabian Nights, and the title image of "Aladdin and the Magic Lamp" in the book then changes to "Sonic and the Secret Rings".

== Development ==
For this game, characters from the Sonic series appeared as those from the Arabian Nights. In this concept art image, Doctor Eggman appears as the form of King Shahryār.

Sonic and the Secret Rings (originally codenamed Sonic Wildfire) was developed by Sonic Team and published by Sega. Sega had initially planned to release a port of the 2006 Xbox 360 and PlayStation 3 game Sonic the Hedgehog as the first Sonic game for the Wii. Citing lengthy development times for a port, Sega switched plans and conceived of a Sonic game that would use the capabilities of the Wii Remote. Producer, writer, and director Yojiro Ogawa, who had previously worked on Sonic Adventure, "already had this basic idea (of Sonic constantly moving forward) in [his] mind", and immediately imagined its compatibility with the Wii.

When we first started thinking about it, the system was still called the Revolution. So we thought we should revolutionize Sonic. I wanted to do something that people haven't seen in previous Sonic titles.

He later decided that this could be done by using the Arabian Nights—a compilation of Middle-Eastern fables—as the game's setting. This inspired the use of Sonic characters as figures from Arabian Nights. Sega removed "some of the extraneous elements" of recent Sonic games to "get ... back to basics". Storyboard director Zachary G. Brown stated that, "This game could put Sonic the Hedgehog in a whole new light. He could reach the top of the charts once more." The game's art and setting were heavily influenced by the games Shadow of the Colossus, Prince of Persia, and God of War. Its cutscenes consistently feature hand-painted, static imagery resembling classic art through paint on parchment. On a technical level, Secret Rings uses the PhysX engine. Sega improved the game's camera system to address criticisms of prior Sonic games.

On January 19, 2006, IGN staff writer Matt Casamassina revealed that "sources close to Sega" had informed IGN of an upcoming Revolution-exclusive Sonic game, which was two months in development. Sega officially announced Sonic Wild Fire at Electronic Entertainment Expo 2006, then as Hyper Sonic at a Nintendo press conference and again as Sonic Wild Fire in its trailers. Sega changed the title to Sonic and the Secret of the Rings, then slightly modified it to Sonic and the Secret Rings in August 2006. Sega preferred Wild Fire over Secret Rings, but the latter better fit the game's story and Arabian Nights.

=== Music ===
The music of Sonic and the Secret Rings was composed by Kenichi Tokoi, Fumie Kumatani, Seirou Okamoto and Hideaki Kobayashi of Wave Master. Steve Conte and Runblebee performed the vocal tracks. The music maintains the guitar-based rock style of previous Sonic titles, adding elements of traditional Middle Eastern music to complement the game's theme and aesthetic. Sega released a video game soundtrack album, Seven Rings in Hand: Sonic and the Secret Rings Original Sound Track, on March 15, 2007. The main theme and album title track of Secret Rings is "Seven Rings in Hand".

== Reception ==
Reception

Aggregate score
| Aggregator | Score |
|---|---|
| Metacritic | 69/100 |

Review scores
| Publication | Score |
|---|---|
| 1Up.com | B |
| Computer and Video Games | 8.2/10 |
| Electronic Gaming Monthly | 6.5/10 |
| Eurogamer | 8/10 |
| Game Informer | 5.5/10 |
| GameSpot | 7.6/10 |
| GameSpy | 3/5 |
| IGN | 6.9/10 |
| Nintendo Power | 8.5/10 |
| Official Nintendo Magazine | 81% |

Sonic and the Secret Rings received "mixed or average" reviews, according to the review aggregation website Metacritic. The game charted well; it was the eleventh best-selling game of February 2007 worldwide, and third for the Wii. It proved the best-selling Wii game and fifth among all platforms in the United Kingdom. In North America, it was thirteenth overall, and fourth for the Wii, with 83,000 copies. In June, July, and August 2007, the game was the fourth, third, and seventh best-selling game for the Wii, respectively. The game received a "Platinum" sales award from the Entertainment and Leisure Software Publishers Association (ELSPA), indicating sales of at least 300,000 copies in the United Kingdom. It sold 30,563 copies in Japan. As of 2008, the game had sold 1.2 million.

Critics felt Secret Rings was a general improvement over recent Sonic games, whose popularity and critical reception had declined. According to Empire, which gave the game 3/5 stars, Secret Rings "reclaims the bewildering blend of platforming and racing that made the series famous" while "fixing the erratic stop-start gameplay that marred recent editions" and showcasing "the best graphics the Wii has to offer this side of Zelda." However, "the occasionally sluggish controls and spasmodic in-game camera mean Sonic's Wii debut is far from perfect." Electronic Gaming Monthly stated that it "does a decent job at stopping the bleeding caused by the recent 360/PS3/PSP Sonics", and 1UP.com's Shane Bettenhausen wrote that the Sonic series was "definitely on the mend" after suffering progressively-worse games after the release of Sonic Adventure. GameSpy's Patrick Joynt agreed, writing that Sonic had been "reanimated to a lurching existence". IGN's Matt Casamassina, Nintendo Power's Chris Shepperd, and GameSpot's Greg Mueller named Secret Rings the best 3D Sonic game, but criticized the 3D titles in general. Eurogamer's Rob Fahey praised the game for employing Sonic as the only playable character.

The game's level design received mixed reviews. Joynt preferred fast levels and felt that the ones requiring players to "move carefully" detracted from the experience. Bettenhausen praised the visual appeal of Secret Rings and compared it to that of Resident Evil 4, a game which critics acclaimed for its visuals. Casamassina agreed that the "Sonic Team has done a lot with [the seven levels]", and praised the varying missions and levels' aesthetic contrast. However, he criticized the placement of obstacles. Fahey denounced levels' "avoidable blind spots and leaps of faith", and found the number of stages and their re-use over multiple missions "a little bit disconcerting". He conceded that it added to the game's replay value, comparing the levels to tracks in racing games.

Control and camera movement concerned reviewers. Bettenhausen called the controls "a tad reckless at first – Sonic's momentum takes some getting used to, and trying to go in reverse is a pain – but become more natural and fluid as you get acclimated to the fast-paced, twitchy action." Casamassina and Mueller offered similar opinions, while Shepperd criticized the game's low camera angle and arbitrary targeting system. Bettenhausen dismissed the game's multiplayer mode as a failed adaptation of the Mario Party series. Fahey concurred, adding that a multiplayer racing mode would have been preferable to "lame" minigames. Casamassina compared the games to those in Super Monkey Ball: Banana Blitz: "only a handful of them really stand out and some are downright pointless, but overall gamers will probably be happy that they were included." Shepperd agreed, but decried the necessity to "play the story mode extensively to unlock some of the party mode's best features."

== Legacy ==
To mark Sonic's introduction in the 2008 Wii game Super Smash Bros. Brawl, Nintendo used "Seven Rings in Hand" and other Sonic series music as backing for the "Green Hill Zone" stage. Sonic Team and Sega later created Sonic and the Black Knight, a sequel to Secret Rings released on March 3, 2009. The two form the Storybook series; Secret Rings is based on Arabian Nights, and Black Knight casts Sonic into the world of King Arthur. On March 18, Secret Rings and Super Monkey Ball: Banana Blitz were compiled in a Wii release titled Sega Fun Pack: Sonic and the Secret Rings & Super Monkey Ball: Banana Blitz. The level Dinosaur Jungle was released as a race track in Sonic Racing: CrossWorlds.

In September 2026, a fan-made remaster of the game titled Project Reignition was released for PC, which includes improved graphics, quality-of-life improvements, and mod support. An update is planned to add Party Mode with online multiplayer.

== See also ==
- Other video game appearances of One Thousand and One Nights
