= The Development =

2008 book by John Barth

First edition (publ. Houghton Mifflin)

The Development is a book of interrelated short stories by American writer John Barth, published in 2008. The stories are set in the Heron Bay Estates gated community for the elderly in Maryland Tidewater.

== Stories ==
1. "Peeping Tom"
2. "Toga Party"
3. "Teardown"
4. "The Bard Award"
5. "Progressive Dinner"
6. "Us/Them"
7. "Assisted Living"
8. "The End"
9. "Rebeginning"
