= The Tidewater Tales =

1987 novel by John Barth

First edition (publ. Putnam)

The Tidewater Tales is a 1987 novel by American writer John Barth. It tells the story of a married couple of storytellers, Peter Sagamore and Katherine Sherritt Sagamore, during the summer of 1980.

According to Richard Lehan of the Los Angeles Times: "In a novel almost two miles long, Barth’s literary self-consciousness is sometimes too much. Less would have been More. The novel becomes a giant literary game, the emphasis upon intertextuality or the relationship of one story to another."
