= Coming Soon (Latvian band) =

Latvian musical group

- Origin: Liepāja, Latvia
- Genres: Rock; Industrial metal Electronica; Symphonic rock
- Years active: 2005–2009 (hiatus)
- Label: Microphone Records
- Members: Uldis Kalns; Roberts Dinters; Kristofers Knesis; Eriks Hanzovskis; Kristaps Leitis
- Past members: Karlis Peterlevics (2005–2008); Janis Snipke (2005–2006)
- Website: comingsoonrock.com

Coming Soon is a rock band hailing from Liepāja, Latvia. There are five members in the band: Uldis Kalns (vocal, guitar), Roberts Dinters (guitar), Kristofers Knesis (keyboards), Eriks Hanzovskis (drums) and Kristaps Leitis (bass).

== Biography ==
Coming Soon started as a band in 2005, when the guitarist Roberts Dinters and keyboardist Kristofers Knesis met. Soon, Karlis Peterlevics joined to play bass, and doing several auditions during 2006, the band chose Uldis Kalns to be the lead singer of the band and Janis Snipke to be the drummer. Coming Soon did their first concert on July 29 of 2006. In September band had a drummer change and it was joined by Eriks Hanzvoskis.

In March 2007, the band did a Take-Away Show video session. In April 2007, the band's second notable success - 2nd place out of 140 bands in the Draugiem.lv and Nokia powered NOKIA EXTREME ANDREJSALĀ contest. In November, band releases themselves their first single, called "Indians". They make a successful debut in Radio SWH, and climb up to 2nd place in 3 weeks, in "Priekšnams TOP 10", with "Indians". The song is also played in other radio stations across Latvia and Baltic States. In October Coming Soon makes a successful debut in Baltic New Music Chart, with "Indians", reaching the #1 spot in second week, but ending the season in 11th place. During the competition Coming Soon also visited another country for the first time. It was in Vilnius, Lithuania. On Latvia Independency Day, November 18, Coming Soon releases the highly anticipated second single, called "Nē!" ("No!" in Latvian).

In June 2008, Coming Soon makes a bass player change and are joined by Kristaps Leitis. During the band contest Coca-Cola Soundwave, Uldis Kalns was labeled as "one of the best vocalists in Latvia". In October the music label Microphone Records releases Coming Soon's song "Pelēka Saule" ("Gray Sun" in Latvian).

== Current line-up ==
- Uldis Kalns - vocals, guitar
- Roberts Dinters - guitar
- Kristofers Knesis - keyboards
- Ēriks Hanzovskis - drums
- Kristaps Leitis - bass
