= The Rose & the Dagger =

2016 novel by Renée Ahdieh

- Author: Renée Ahdieh
- Language: English
- Subject: Young adult literature, Fairy tale
- Published: 2016 (Putnam)
- Publication place: United States
- Media type: Print (hardback, paperback)
- Pages: 416
- ISBN: 9780399171628
- OCLC: 947041672
- Preceded by: The Wrath & the Dawn

The Rose & the Dagger is a 2016 young adult novel by Renée Ahdieh, a sequel of The Wrath & the Dawn, that continues the story of Shahrzad and Khalid.

== Reception ==
The Horn Book Magazine, in a guide review of The Rose & the Dagger, wrote: "Despite more focus on war than on the romance, this conclusion to Ahdieh's The Wrath & the Dawn will satisfy fans." and the School Library Journal wrote "Beautiful, lyrical writing combines with a cohesive plot, richly drawn backdrop, and just the right mix of action and romance to create an undeniable new classic."

The Rose & the Dagger has also been reviewed by Kirkus Reviews, Booklist, Voice of Youth Advocates, Common Sense Media, and Romantic Times.
