= Coming Soon (French band) =

French indie band

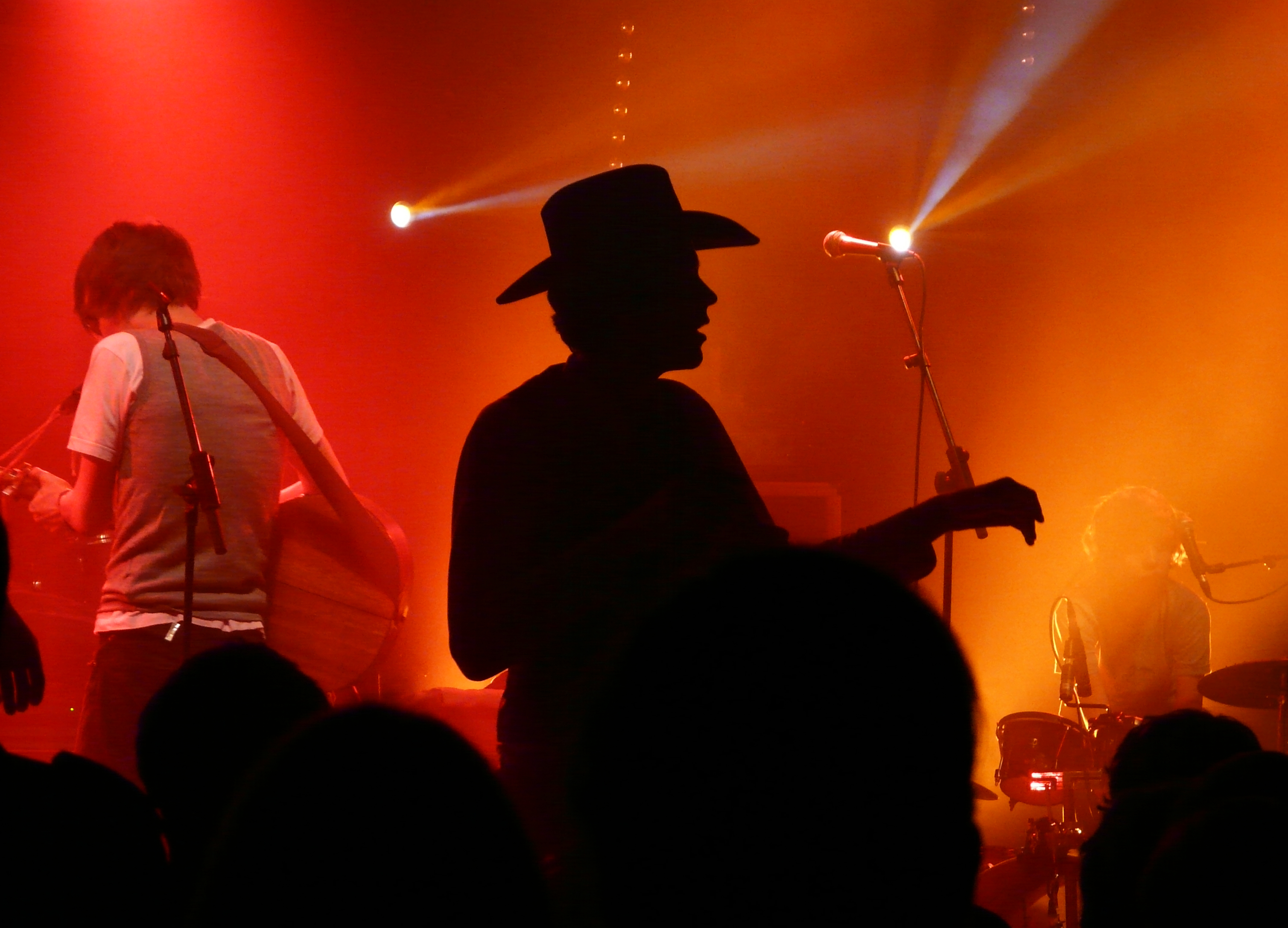
- Coming Soon at Club 106 in 2008

Background information
- Origin: Annecy, Rhône-Alpes, France
- Genres: Anti-folk, indie folk, folk rock, indie pop
- Years active: 2005–present
- Label: Kitchen
- Members: Howard Hughes; Leo Bear Creek; Ben Lupus; Billy Jet Pilot; Alexander Van Pelt (Alex Banjo)
- Past members: Caroline Van Pelt; Mary Salomé

Coming Soon are a French indie folk band founded in 2005. Their latest album is Sentimental Jukebox 2018. The group was founded in Annecy, Rhône-Alpes, France and consists of five members: Howard Hughes, Leo Bear Creek, Ben Lupus, Billy Jet Pilot, and Alex Banjo. They have released a total of five studio albums.

== Discography ==
=== Studio albums ===
Title	Year
New Grids	2008
Ghost Train Tragedy	2009
Dark Spring	2011
Tiger Meets Lion	2013
Sentimental Jukebox	2017

=== Singles and EPs ===
Title	Year
The Escort	2007
Big Boy Single	2007
Love in the Afternoon	2009
Sweetheart / Wu	2010
B-Sides & Rarities, Vol. 1, Vol. 2, & Vol. 3	2011
Disappear Here EP	2013
Sun Gets In	2014
Remind	2016
아픈 멜로디	2017
Love Song	2018
I'm Your Man	2020
