= Renée Ahdieh =

American-Korean author

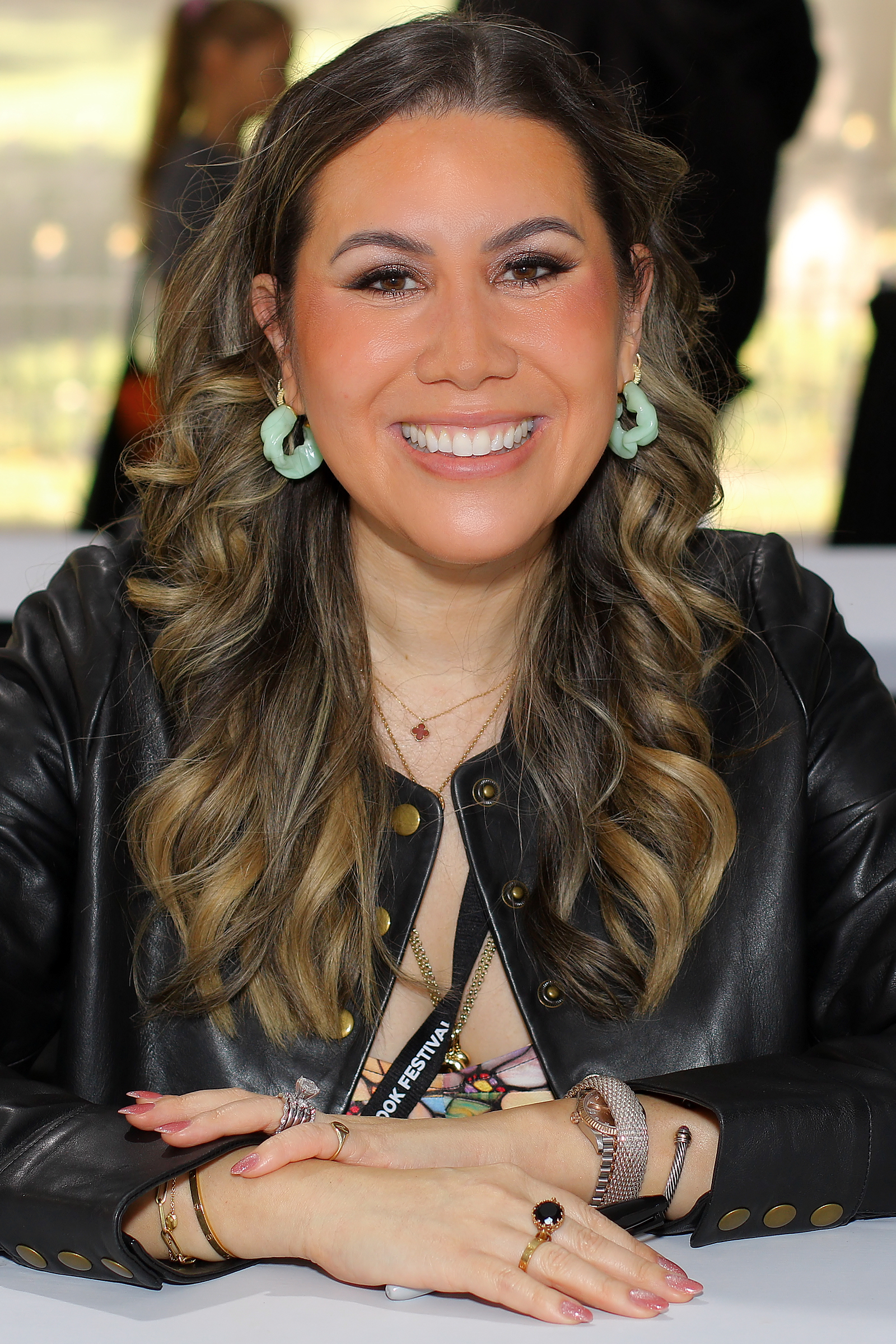
- Ahdieh at the 2025 Texas Book Festival
- Born: July 7, 1983 (age 43)
- Education: University of North Carolina at Chapel Hill
- Occupation: Writer
- Writing career
- Period: 2010s–present
- Genre: Young adult fantasy
- Website: reneeahdieh.com

Renée Ahdieh is an American-Korean author, best known for her New York Times best-selling series The Wrath & the Dawn. Her books have been translated into many languages.

== Life ==
Renée Ahdieh spent her first years of childhood growing up in her mother's homeland of Seoul, South Korea. As a young child, she enjoyed reading and grew fond of fantasy, romance, and history. As a result of her heritage, Ahdieh looked for novels that supported diversity at an early age. She enjoyed and later drew inspiration from a variety of authors, such as Paulo Coelho, Isabel Allende, F. Scott Fitzgerald, Rabindranath Tagore, Diana Gabaldon, Naguib Mahfouz, Anne Rice, Salman Rushdie, and Libba Bray, as well as The Arabian Nights, which is the inspiration for her novel The Wrath and the Dawn.

Ahdieh graduated from the University of North Carolina at Chapel Hill. Currently, she resides in Charlotte, North Carolina with her husband, Victor, and their dog, Mushu.

== Career ==
On May 12, 2015, G. P. Putnam's Sons released Ahdieh's first novel, The Wrath & the Dawn. Ahdieh envisioned a re-imagining of One Thousand and One Nights, which is a famous collection of Middle Eastern and South Asian folktales. She also drew inspiration from her husband's Persian family heritage. The sequel, The Rose & the Dagger, was published on April 26, 2016. Though she first planned this series as a trilogy, her publisher encouraged her to focus on just two novels to avoid series fatigue. In addition to the two novels, Ahdieh released three short stories in this same world within a few months of each other in 2016.

Imagine Entertainment optioned the film rights to The Wrath & the Dawn in 2017.

On May 16, 2017, Ahdieh released Flame in the Mist, the first book in a new series with nods to the East Asian stories she loved as a child. She found inspiration for the novel in strong female characters, such as Hermione Granger and Mulan, and stated that since she felt out-of-place at times as a mixed-race child, she often writes novels that expand on different perspectives and hopes to create characters that show varying levels of strength. Flame in the Mist features a heroine who disguises herself as a man to defeat a dark clan that attempted to slaughter her just before an arranged marriage. A sequel titled Smoke in the Sun was released June 5, 2018.

The Beautiful, the beginning of a new series set in 1872 New Orleans, was published on October 8, 2019.

In November 2019, a web comic version of The Wrath & the Dawn began publishing as a Webtoon Originals comic, with Ahdieh collaborating with artist SilvesterVitale. Ahdieh's current agent is Barbara Poelle of the Irene Goodman Literature Agency.

== Publications ==
The Wrath and the Dawn

1. The Wrath & the Dawn (May 12, 2015)
2. The Rose & the Dagger (April 26, 2016)

The Wrath and the Dawn short stories

1. The Crown and the Arrow (March 1, 2016)
2. The Moth and the Flame (March 22, 2016)
3. The Mirror and the Maze (April 26, 2016)

The Flame in the Mist

1. Flame in the Mist (May 16, 2017)
2. Smoke in the Sun (June 5, 2018)
3. Ókami (short story, 2018)
4. Yumi (short story, 2018)

The Beautiful

1. The Beautiful (October 8, 2019)
2. The Damned (July 7, 2020)
3. The Righteous (December 7, 2021)
4. The Ruined (December 5, 2023)

Park Avenue (June 3, 2025)

Anthologies

1. "The Blood of Imuriv" in Because You Love to Hate Me: 13 Tales of Villainy, edited by Amerie (July 11, 2017)
2. "La Revancha del Tango" in Three Sides of a Heart: Stories about Love Triangles (December 19, 2017)
3. "Nothing into All" in A Thousand Beginnings and Endings, edited by Ellen Oh and Elsie Chapman (June 26, 2018)

== Awards ==
- #1 New York Times Bestseller
- USA Today Bestseller
- #4 on the Summer 2015 Kids' Indie Next List!
- Amazon's Best Books of the Year for 2015 – Young Adult
- 2015 A New York Public Library Best Book for Teens
- 2015 A Seventeen Magazine Best Book
- A YALSA 2016 Best Fiction for Young Adults Pick
- Junior Library Guild Selection
- 2015 A Booklist Top Ten First Novel for Young Adults
