= Coming Soon!!! =

2001 novel by John Barth

- First edition
- Author: John Barth
- Language: English
- Publisher: Houghton Mifflin
- Publication date: 2001
- Publication place: United States

Coming Soon!!! is a novel by the American writer John Barth, published in 2001.

The competing protagonists of the metafictional work are the Novelist Emeritus, who is a recently retired novelist from Johns Hopkins University, and the Novelist Aspirant, Johns Hopkins Johnson. The Novelist Emeritus plans to reorchestrate his first novel, The Floating Opera, as The Original Floating Opera II, and the Novelist Aspirant challenges him by attempting to reinvent that novel himself in hypertext.
