= The Wrath & the Dawn =

2015 novel by Renée Ahdieh

- Author: Renée Ahdieh
- Language: English
- Subject: Young adult literature, Fairy tale
- Published: 2015 (Putnam)
- Publication place: United States
- Media type: Print (hardback, paperback)
- Pages: 404
- ISBN: 9780399171611
- OCLC: 934679713
- Followed by: The Rose & the Dagger

The Wrath & the Dawn is a 2015 young adult novel by Renée Ahdieh. It is a reimagining of the Arabian Nights and is about a teenage girl, Shahrzad, who, as an act of revenge, volunteers to marry a caliph, Khalid, even though she is aware that he takes a new bride each night and has them executed at sunrise, but then finds herself falling in love with him.

In November 2019, a web novel adaptation of The Wrath & the Dawn began publishing as a Webtoon Originals comic, with Ahdieh collaborating with artist SilvesterVitale and writer/producer Stephen Lamm.

== Reception ==
The Horn Book Magazine, in a guide review of The Wrath & the Dawn, wrote "Questions about the value of life drive both romance and political intrigue; Shahrzad is an intriguing character: a determined survivor who inspires loyalty and love while standing down any opposition that comes her way."

The School Library Journal found it "A quick moving plot and sassy, believable dialogue ..." and noted "The rich, Middle Eastern cultural context adds to the author's adept worldbuilding."

It is a New York Times bestseller.

The Wrath & the Dawn has also been reviewed by Kirkus Reviews, Publishers Weekly, Booklist, Voice of Youth Advocates, Common Sense Media, the Deseret News, The Christian Science Monitor, and Romantic Times.

Imagine Entertainment optioned the film rights to The Wrath and the Dawn in 2017.

== Webcomic ==
The webcomic adaptation of the Wrath & the Dawn began publishing on November 4, 2019, and finished its first season on January 25, 2021, before beginning its second season on April 26 of the same year. As of early June 2021, the comic is ongoing and has over 940,000 subscribers. As of late June 2021, the comic is ongoing and has over 970,000 subscribers. The webcomic published its series finale in early March 2022.
