= John Barth =

American writer (1930–2024)

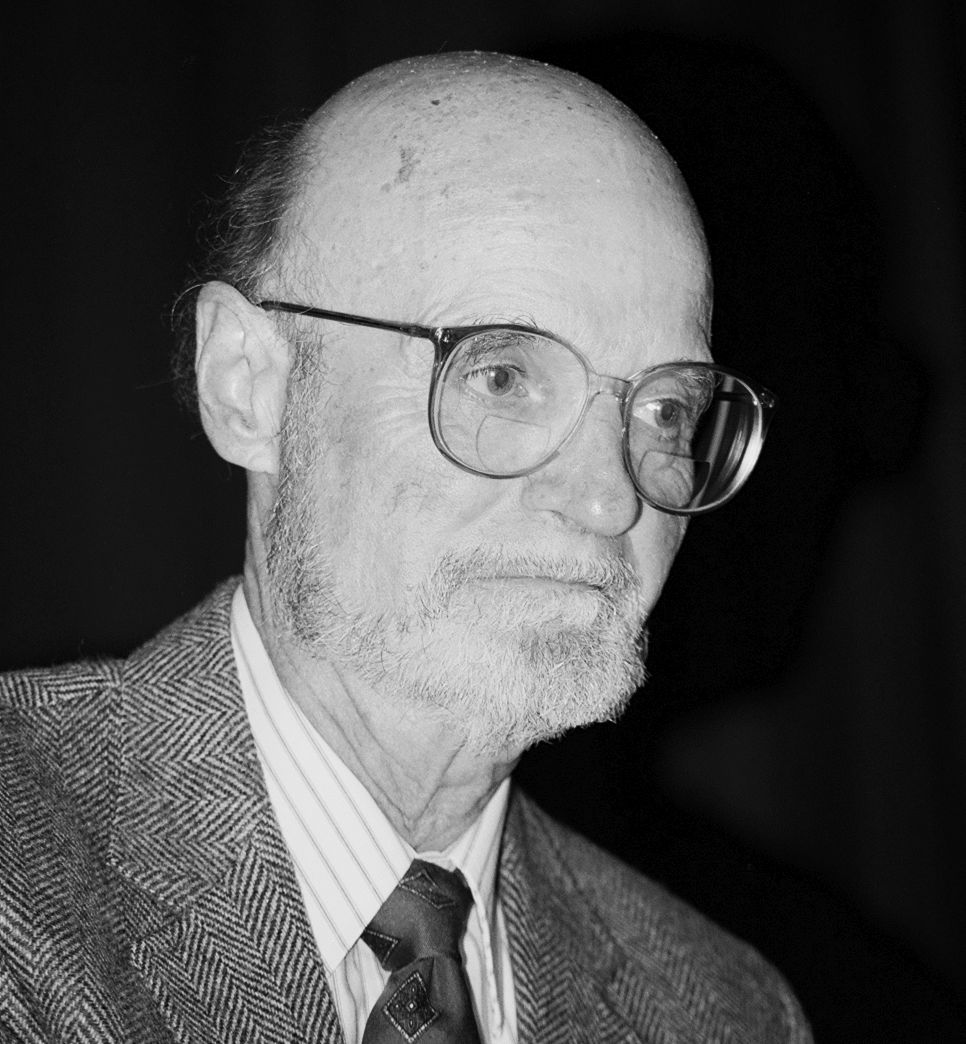
- Barth in 1995
- Born: May 27, 1930; Cambridge, Maryland, U.S.
- Died: April 2, 2024 (aged 93); Bonita Springs, Florida, U.S.
- Education: Juilliard School; Johns Hopkins University (BA, MA)
- Occupations: Novelist; academic
- Writing career
- Period: 1956–2022
- Genres: Postmodernism; metafiction
- Notable awards: National Book Award; 1973 Chimera

John Simmons Barth (/bɑːrθ/; May 27, 1930 – April 2, 2024) was an American writer best known for his postmodern and metafictional fiction. His most highly regarded and influential works were published in the 1960s, and include The Sot-Weed Factor, a whimsical retelling of Maryland's colonial history; Giles Goat-Boy, a satirical fantasy in which a university is a microcosm of the Cold War world; and Lost in the Funhouse, a self-referential and experimental collection of short stories. He was co-recipient of the National Book Award in 1973 for his episodic novel Chimera.

== Life ==
John Simmons Barth, called "Jack", was born in Cambridge, Maryland, on May 27, 1930. His parents were John Jacob and Georgia (Simmons) Barth. His father ran a candy store. He had an older brother, Bill, and a twin sister, Jill. In 1947, he graduated from Cambridge High School, where he played drums and wrote for the school newspaper. He briefly studied Elementary Theory and Advanced Orchestration at the Juilliard School before attending Johns Hopkins University, where he received a B.A. in 1951 and an M.A. in 1952. His thesis novel, The Shirt of Nessus, drew on his experiences at Johns Hopkins.

Barth married Harriet Anne Strickland on January 11, 1950. He published two short stories that same year, one in Johns Hopkins's student literary magazine and one in The Hopkins Review. His daughter, Christine Ann, was born in the summer of 1951. His son, John Strickland, was born the following year.

From 1953 to 1965, Barth was a professor at Pennsylvania State University, where he met his second wife, Shelly Rosenberg. His third child, Daniel Stephen, was born in 1954. In 1965, he moved to the State University of New York at Buffalo, where he taught from 1965 to 1973. In that period, he came to know "the remarkable short fiction" of the Argentine Jorge Luis Borges, which inspired his collection Lost in the Funhouse.

Barth taught at Boston University as a visiting professor in 1972, then at Johns Hopkins University from 1973 until he retired in 1995 with the emeritus rank.

Barth died under hospice care in Bonita Springs, Florida, on April 2, 2024, at the age of 93.

== Literary work ==
Barth's career began with The Floating Opera and The End of the Road, two short realist novels that deal with controversial topics: suicide and abortion, respectively.

The Sot-Weed Factor (1960; the title is an archaic phrase meaning "the tobacco merchant") was initially intended as completing a trilogy of "realist" novels, but developed into a different project and is seen as marking Barth's discovery of postmodernism. It reimagines the life of Ebenezer Cooke, a poet in colonial Maryland, and recounts a series of fantastic and often comic adventures, including an account of the story of Captain John Smith and Pocahontas.

Barth's next novel, Giles Goat-Boy (1966), is a lengthy satirical fantasy serving as an allegory of the Cold War, set in a university divided into an authoritarian East Campus and a more open West Campus. George Giles, a boy raised as a goat, discovers his humanity and sets out on a quest to become a "Grand Tutor", a messiah-like spiritual leader within the university. The novel was a surprise best-seller, and some consider it Barth's best work.

The short story collection Lost in the Funhouse (1968) and the novella collection Chimera (1972) are even more metafictional than their two predecessors, foregrounding the writing process and presenting achievements such as a seven-deep nested quotation. Chimera shared the U.S. National Book Award for Fiction.

In his epistolary novel LETTERS (1979), Barth corresponds with characters from his other books. Later novels such as The Tidewater Tales (1987) and The Last Voyage of Somebody the Sailor (1991) continue in the metafictional vein, using writers as protagonists who interact with their own and other stories in elaborate ways. Once Upon a Time: A Floating Opera (1994) casts Barth himself as the protagonist who encounters characters and situations from previous works on a sailing trip.

== Styles, approaches and artistic criteria ==
Barth's work is characterized by a historical awareness of literary tradition and by the practice of rewriting typical of postmodernism. He said, "I don't know what my view of history is, but insofar as it involves some allowance for repetition and recurrence, reorchestration, and reprise [...] I would always want it to be more in the form of a thing circling out and out and becoming more inclusive each time." In Barth's postmodern sensibility, parody is a central device.

Around 1972, in an interview, Barth declared that "The process [of making a novel] is the content, more or less."

== Essays ==
While writing these books, Barth was also pondering and discussing the theoretical problems of fiction writing. In 1967, he wrote a highly influential and controversial essay considered a manifesto of postmodernism, "The Literature of Exhaustion" (first printed in The Atlantic in 1967). It depicts literary realism as a "used-up" tradition; Barth's description of his own work, which many thought illustrated a core trait of postmodernism, is "novels which imitate the form of a novel, by an author who imitates the role of author". The essay was widely considered a statement of "the death of the novel", but Barth later insisted that he had merely been making clear that a particular stage in history was passing, and pointing to possible directions from there. In 1980, he wrote and published another essay, "The Literature of Replenishment".

== Awards ==
- 1956: National Book Award finalist for The Floating Opera
- 1965: The Brandeis University creative arts award
- 1965: The Rockefeller Foundation grant
- 1966: National Institute of Arts and Letters grant
- 1968: Nominated for the National Book Award for Lost in the Funhouse
- 1973: Shared the National Book Award for Chimera with John Edward Williams for Augustus
- 1974: Elected to the American Academy of Arts and Letters
- 1974: Fellow of the American Academy of Arts and Sciences
- 1997: F. Scott Fitzgerald Award for Outstanding Achievement in American Fiction
- 1998: Lannan Foundation Lifetime Achievement Award
- 1998: PEN/Malamud Award
- 1999: Enoch Pratt Society's Lifetime Achievement in Letters Award
- 2008: Roozi Rozegari, Iranian literature prize for best foreign work translation, The Floating Opera

== Bibliography ==
=== Novels ===
- The Floating Opera (1956)
- The End of the Road (1958)
- The Sot-Weed Factor (1960)
- Giles Goat-Boy (1966)
- Chimera (1972)
- LETTERS (1979)
- Sabbatical: A Romance (1982)
- The Tidewater Tales (1987)
- The Last Voyage of Somebody the Sailor (1991)
- Once Upon a Time: A Floating Opera (1994)
- Coming Soon!!!: A Narrative (2001)
- Where Three Roads Meet (2005)
- Every Third Thought: A Novel in Five Seasons (2011)

=== Short story collections ===
- Lost in the Funhouse: Fiction for Print, Tape, Live Voice (1968)
- On with the Story (1996)
- The Book of Ten Nights and a Night: Eleven Stories (2004)
- The Development: Nine Stories (2008)
- Collected Stories (2015)

=== Nonfiction ===
- The Friday Book: Essays and Other Nonfiction (1984)
- Further Fridays: Essays, Lectures, and Other Nonfiction, 1984–1994 (1995)
- Final Fridays: Essays, Lectures, Tributes & Other Nonfiction, 1995–2012 (2012)
- Postscripts (or Just Desserts): Some Final Scribblings (2022)

== See also ==
- Maryland literature
