= Scheherazade =

Character from Arabian Nights

Scheherazade شهرزاد
- One Thousand and One Nights character
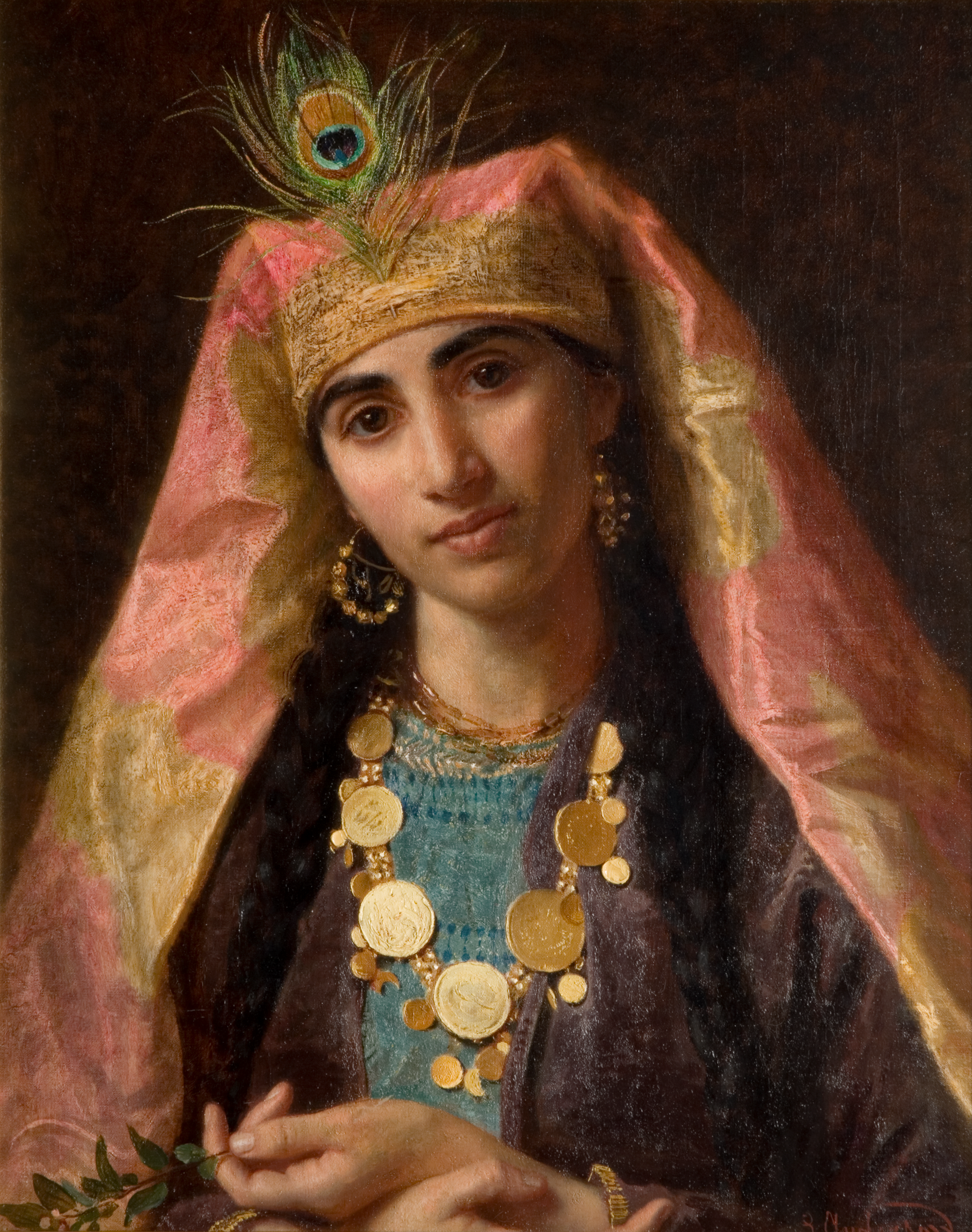
- Scheherazade, 19th century painting by Sophie Anderson
- Portrayed by: Mili Avital, Catherine Zeta-Jones, Claude Jade, Anna Karina, María Montez, Cyrine Abdelnour, Sulaf Fawakherji, Annette Haven, Meredith Stepien, Damini Kanwal Shetty

In-universe information
- Gender: Female
- Occupation: Queen consort
- Family: The chief vizier (father); Dunyazad (sister)
- Spouses: Shahryar
- Children: 3 sons and possibly 1 daughter
- Other names: Shahrazad, Shahrzad

Scheherazade (/ʃəˌhɛrəˈzɑːd(ə)/ also spelled Sheherazade, Shahrazad, or Šahrzād) is the legendary narrator and central framing character of One Thousand and One Nights (Arabic: أَلْفُ لَيْلَةٍ وَلَيْلَةٌ, romanized: Alf Laylah wa-Laylah), a collection of Middle Eastern, South Asian, and North African folktales compiled in Arabic between roughly the 8th and 14th centuries. Scheherazade is married to King Shahryar, and saves herself, and ultimately the women of the kingdom, from execution by recounting a continuous sequence of interlinked stories over the course of 1,001 nights.

Scheherazade does not act as the protagonist of the individual tales she narrates, but functions as the unifying narrative consciousness of the entire work. Through deliberate pacing, narrative suspense, and thematic selection, she gradually transforms Shahryar from a ruler driven by vengeance and misogyny into a just and stable king. Her role establishes the frame story that encloses and gives coherence to the diverse body of tales that constitute One Thousand and One Nights.

According to the frame narrative, Shahryar, after discovering the infidelity of his first wife, adopts a policy of marrying a virgin each night and having her executed at dawn. After many deaths, Scheherazade, the learned daughter of the royal vizier, volunteers to marry him. On their wedding night she begins telling a story but leaves it unfinished at sunrise. Shahryar postpones her execution in order to hear the conclusion, a pattern that repeats night after night. Over the course of 1,001 nights, Sheherazade relates stories of kings, merchants, lovers, jinn, and adventurers, frequently embedding stories within stories, until Shahryar renounces his vow of violence and spares her life permanently.

Scheherazade is consistently portrayed as exceptionally intelligent, educated, and eloquent. In many versions of the text, she is described as having mastered history, poetry, philosophy, and religious learning. By selecting tales that reflect on justice, restraint, fidelity, and the abuse of power, she encourages Shahryar to reassess his own actions without confronting him directly.

Through her function as both character and narrative structure, Scheherazade has become one of the most influential figures in world literature.

== Name ==
The name Scheherazade derives from Middle Persian Šahrzād (also rendered Šahrāzād), traditionally analysed as a compound of šahr (شهر, “city” or “realm”) and the suffix -zād (زاد, “born of” or “descended from”), yielding the sense “born of the city” or “daughter of the realm.” The name follows common Iranian onomastic patterns and fits the courtly associations attributed to the character in later versions of the frame narrative.

When the stories entered Arabic literary circulation, the name was adapted phonologically as Šahrāzād (شَهْرَزاد / شهرزاد). In Arabic manuscripts of Alf Layla wa-Layla, spelling and vocalisation vary, reflecting both regional pronunciation and the absence of full vowel notation in early texts. The Arabic form preserves the Persian structure of the name rather than translating its semantic components, indicating that the character was inherited rather than newly coined within Arabic narrative tradition.

European spellings emerged in the early modern period through translation. Antoine Galland’s French version (1704–1717) popularised the form Schéhérazade, from which most later Western variants descend. English translations of the nineteenth century, including those by Edward William Lane and Richard Burton, stabilised the spelling Scheherazade, though alternatives such as Shahrazad and Shahrazade continue to appear in scholarly and literary contexts.

== History ==
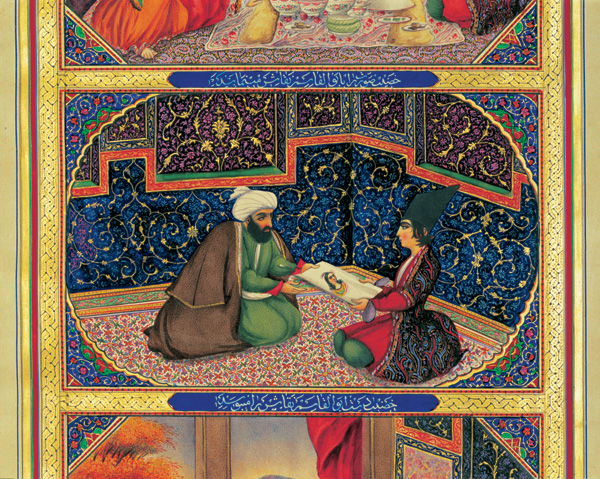
Scheherazade and the sultan by Iranian painter Sani al Mulk (1849–1856)

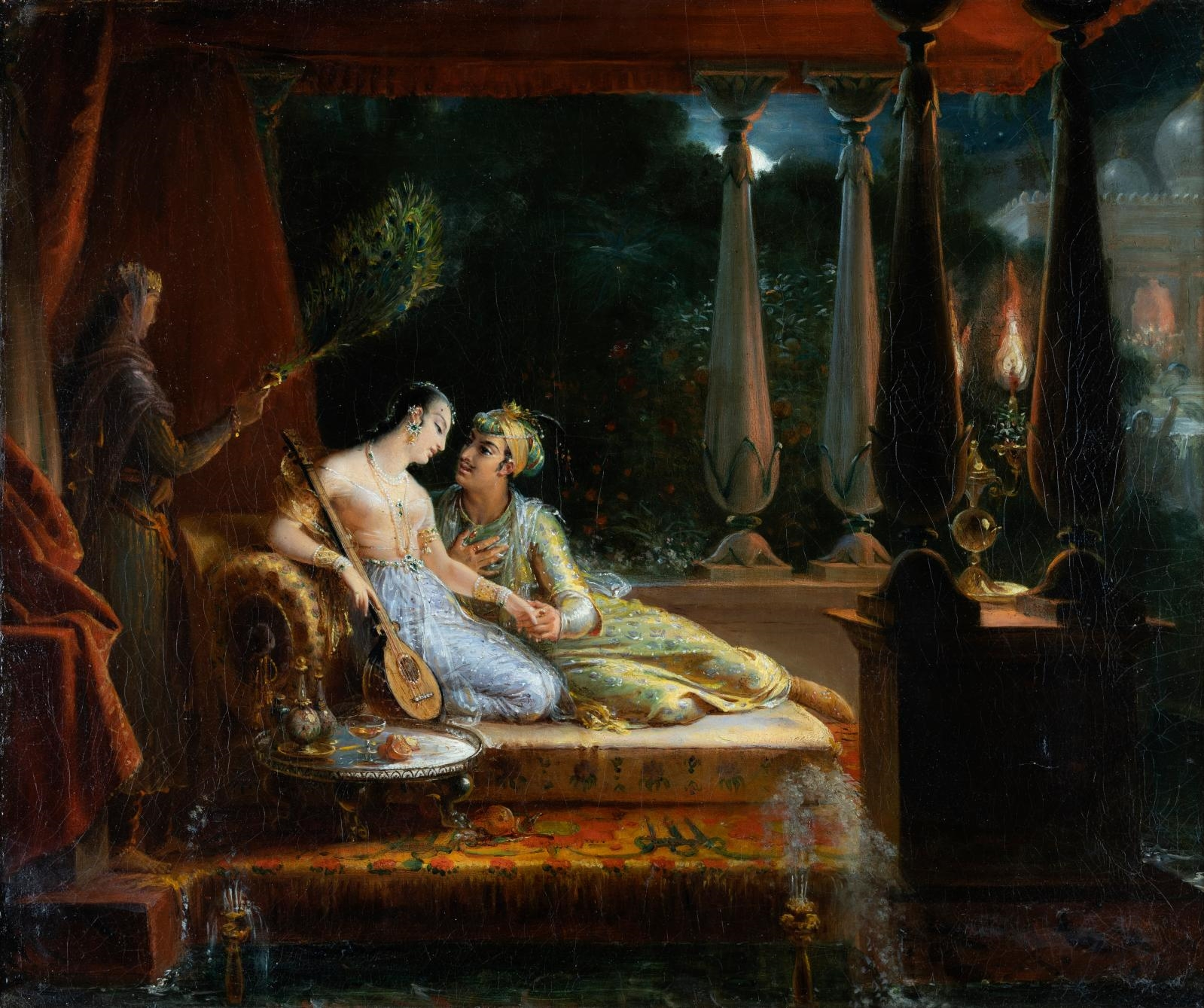
Marie-Éléonore Godefroid, Scheherazade and Shahryar, c. 1842

The earliest references to a work resembling Alf Layla wa-Layla appear in Arabic sources from the ninth century, which describe a collection of stories translated from a Middle Persian original known as Hazār Afsān (“A Thousand Stories”). No complete manuscript from this period survives, and the earliest extant Arabic manuscripts are fragmentary, dating from the ninth and tenth centuries. These early texts already employ a female storyteller as a framing device, a role that would later be fully developed in the character of Scheherazade.

Between the ninth and fourteenth centuries, the collection evolved through oral performance and manuscript transmission across major urban centres of the Islamic world, particularly Baghdad, Damascus, and Cairo. During this period, Scheherazade’s narrative voice was shaped by multiple literary and cultural traditions, including Persian court literature, Arabic adab, Hellenistic romance motifs transmitted through Greek sources, and narrative material from Egyptian, North African, and broader Near Eastern storytelling cultures. While no Andalusi manuscript of the Nights survives, thematic and structural affinities suggest indirect influence from the western Islamic world.

By the twelfth century, the frame narrative of Scheherazade and the conceit of storytelling over 1,001 nights were firmly established, though the corpus itself remained open and unstable. Tales were continually added, adapted, and rearranged in later medieval manuscripts, particularly in Egypt, where the collection reached a form closer to that known today.

The oldest known text of the tale of Scheherazade is a ninth century (CE) Arabic manuscript from Cairo. Across the next five centuries, Scheherazade’s witty and dynamic voice was taken up by storytellers across the cultivated urban centres of Baghdad, Damascus, Cairo, and al-Andalus, with influences from multiple traditions, including Greek, Coptic, North African, and Hebrew. By the twelfth century the 1001 Nights was established, with the story of Scheherazade being its frame. Al-Maqrizi identified her with the legendary Persian queen Humay Chehrzad

== Narrative ==
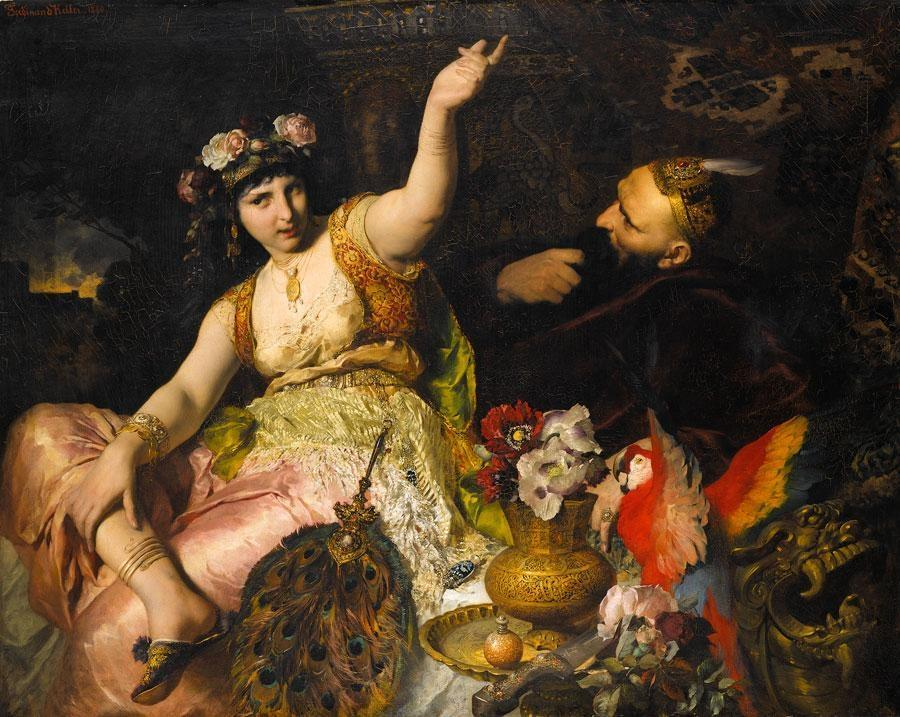
Scheherazade and the sultan by German painter Ferdinand Keller, 1880

In the frame narrative of Alf Layla wa-Layla, King Shahryar, ruler of an unnamed eastern kingdom, discovers that his wife has been unfaithful. He has her executed and, believing that all women are inherently deceitful, adopts a policy of marrying a virgin each night and having her put to death the following morning. After many such executions, the king’s vizier, whose duty it is to supply the brides, finds himself unable to continue.

Scheherazade, the vizier’s eldest daughter, volunteers to marry the king despite her father’s objections. On the night of the marriage, she asks that her younger sister, Dunyazad, be brought into the chamber. At a prearranged moment, Dunyazad requests that Scheherazade tell a story. Scheherazade begins a tale but deliberately leaves it unfinished at dawn. Curious to hear the conclusion, Shahryar postpones her execution.

This pattern is repeated night after night. Each evening Scheherazade either concludes the previous story or begins a new one, always breaking off at a moment of suspense at daybreak. Over the course of 1,001 nights, she relates a succession of narratives involving kings, merchants, lovers, tricksters, and supernatural beings, often embedding stories within stories. The tales frequently explore themes of justice, restraint, fidelity, and the abuse of power.

As time passes, Shahryar’s attitude toward women and authority gradually changes. He abandons his practice of executions and comes to recognize Scheherazade’s wisdom and virtue. At the end of the 1,001 nights, he spares her life permanently and makes her his queen, bringing the cycle of violence to an end and establishing the frame within which the collection’s stories are told.

== See also ==
- List of works influenced by One Thousand and One Nights
