= Lost in the Funhouse =

1968 short story collection by John Barth

Lost in the Funhouse: Fiction for Print, Tape, Live Voice
- First edition
- Author: John Barth
- Language: English
- Publisher: Doubleday
- Publication date: 1968
- Publication place: United States
- Media type: Print

Lost in the Funhouse (1968) is a short story collection by American author John Barth. The postmodern stories are extremely self-conscious and self-reflexive, and are considered to exemplify metafiction.

Though Barth's reputation rests mainly on his long novels, the stories "Night-Sea Journey", "Lost in the Funhouse", "Title" and "Life-Story" from Lost in the Funhouse are widely anthologized. The book appeared the year after the publication of his essay The Literature of Exhaustion, in which Barth said that the traditional modes of realistic fiction had been used up, but that this exhaustion itself could be used to inspire a new generation of writers, citing Nabokov, Beckett, and especially Borges as exemplars of this new approach. Lost in the Funhouse took these ideas to an extreme, for which it was both praised and condemned by critics.

== Overview ==
Each story can be considered complete in itself, and in fact several of them were published separately before being collected. Barth insists, however, on the serial nature of the stories, and that a unity can be found in them as collected. Barth shows his pessimism in the stories, and says he identifies with "Anonymiad".

== Background ==
When Barth began attending Johns Hopkins University in 1947, he enrolled in one of only two creative writing courses available in the US at the time. He went on to become one of the first full-time professors of creative writing. The stories in Lost in the Funhouse display a professorial concern with fictional form.

Lost in the Funhouse was Barth's first book after the 1967 "The Literature of Exhaustion", an essay in which Barth claimed that the traditional modes of realistic writing had been exhausted and no longer served the contemporary writer, but that the exhaustion of these techniques could be turned into a new source of inspiration. Barth cited a number of contemporary writers, such as Vladimir Nabokov, Samuel Beckett, and especially Jorge Luis Borges, as important examples of this. The essay later came to be seen by some as an early description of postmodernism. Barth has described the stories of Lost in the Funhouse as "mainly late modernist" and "postmodernist".

=== Influences ===
Jorge Luis Borges was a primary influence, as acknowledged by Barth a number of times, most notably in "The Literature of Exhaustion". Beckett was another influence.

== Publication history ==
Written between 1966 and 1968, several of the stories had already been published separately.

Barth has said he has written his books in pairs: the realistic, existential novels The Floating Opera and The End of the Road were followed by the long, mythical novels The Sot-Weed Factor and Giles Goat-Boy. Lost in the Funhouse came out in 1968, and was followed in 1972 by Chimera, a collection of three self-aware, interrelated, metafictional novellas.

=== Stories ===
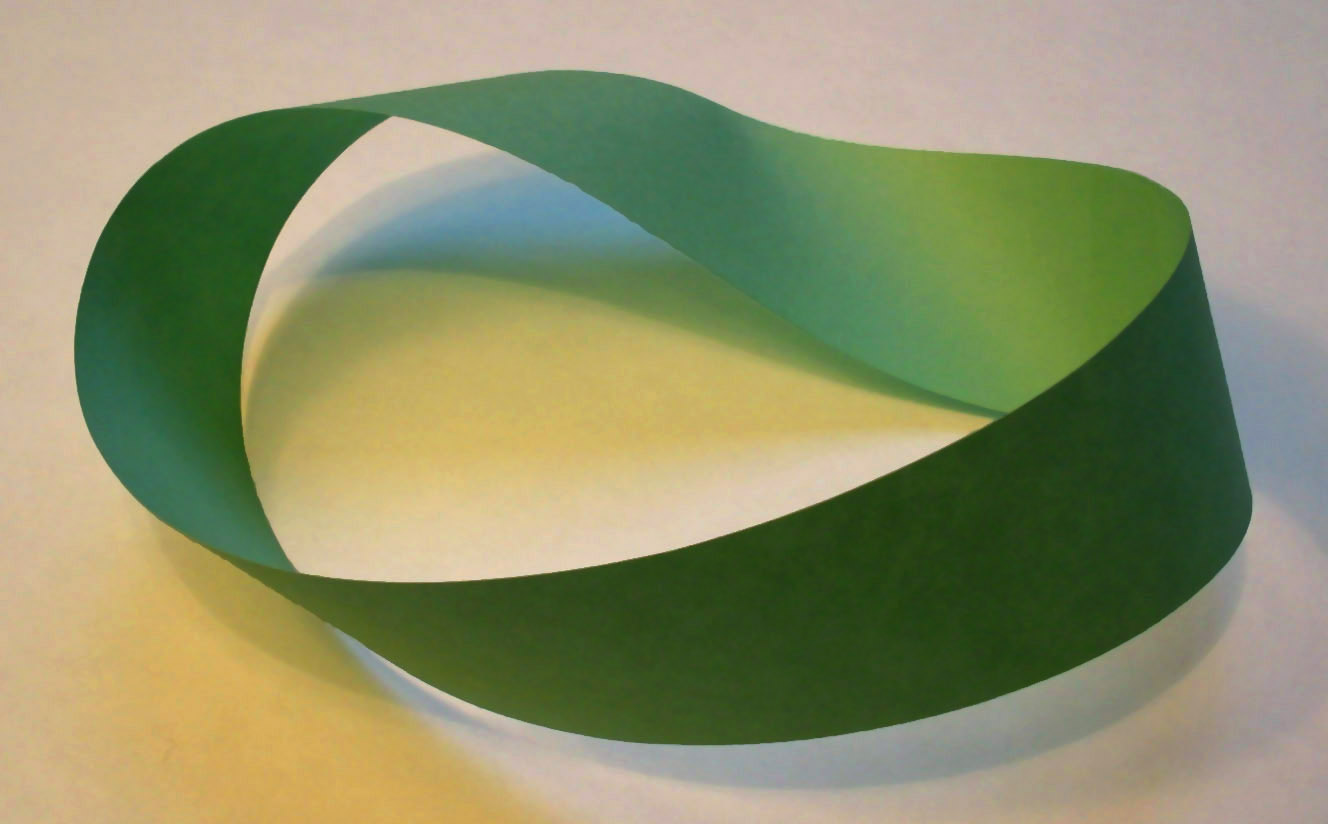
Lost in the Funhouse opens with a "story" which can be cut and pasted to form an endless Möbius strip

The book opens with "Frame-Tale", a "story" in which "ONCE UPON A TIME THERE" and "WAS A STORY THAT BEGAN" are printed vertically, one on each side of the page. This is intended to be cut out by the reader, and its ends being fastened together, after being twisted once in a Möbius strip. This results in a regressus ad infinitum, a loop with no beginning or end.

"Night-Sea Journey" follows the first-person story of a human spermatozoon on its way to fertilize an egg. The tale allegorically recapitulates the story of human life in condensed form.

In "Petition", one half of a pair of Siamese twins, joined at the stomach to his brother's back, writes a petition in 1931 to Prajadhipok, King of Siam (now Thailand), protesting his brother's not acknowledging his existence.

In "Menalaiad", Barth leads the reader in and out of seven metaleptic layers. Menalaus despairs as his story progresses through layer after layer of quotation marks, as one story is framed by another and then another.

"Autobiography", which is "meant for monophonic tape and visible but silent author", is a self-aware story narrating itself and decrying its father, John Barth.

Three of the stories—"Ambrose, His Mark"; "Water-Message"; and the title story, "Lost in the Funhouse"—concern a young boy named Ambrose and members of his family. The first story is told in first person, leading up to describing how Ambrose received his name. The second is told in third person, written in a deliberately archaic style. The third is the most metafictional of the three, with a narrator commenting on the story's form and literary devices as it progresses.

“Echo” retells the story of the prophet Tiresias, Narcissus, and Echo. Told out of sequence, the speaker could at any point be (or is simultaneously) Tiresias offering his prophecy in the third person, Narcissus repeating it to himself, or Echo mirroring either (or both).

"Title" is another metafictional commentary on its own telling. In what is apparently an argument between a couple with problems in their relationship, Barth rejects giving details of names and descriptions, instead just using the words "fill in the blank".

“Life-Story” is a recursive metafiction about an author believing he is a character in a work of fiction while himself writing about a character who believes they are in a work of fiction who is also writing about a character who believes they are fictional, etc.

"Anonymiad" is about a nameless minstrel trapped on a deserted island during the Trojan War. Without his lyre, he transitions from verse to prose, inventing fiction and literature (and metafiction). Writing his stories on sheepskins, he launches them as messages in bottles to be found or lost and forgotten.

In keeping with the book's subtitle—"Fiction for Print, Tape, Live Voice"—the "Author's Note" by Barth indicates the various media through which a number of these stories can be conveyed. In particular, he notes that recorded and/or live voice can be used to convey "Night-Sea Journey", "Glossolalia", "Echo", "Autobiography", and "Title".

=== List of stories ===
1. "Frame-Tale"
2. "Night-sea Journey"
3. "Ambrose His Mark"
4. "Autobiography"
5. "Water-message"
6. "Petition"
7. "Lost in the Funhouse"
8. "Echo"
9. "Two Meditations"
10. "Title"
11. "Glossolalia"
12. "Life-story"
13. "Menelaiad"
14. "Anonymiad"

== Reception ==
Lost in the Funhouse was nominated for the National Book Award (Barth would win the award for his next book, Chimera, in 1973).

Among Barth's detractors, John Gardner wrote in On Moral Fiction that Barth's stories were immoral and fake, as they portrayed life as absurd.

In 1981, Michael Hinden lauded the collection as "one of the most animated and vigorous works of fiction published in the last decade." Max F. Schulz has said that "Barth's mature career as a fabulist begins with Lost in the Funhouse", and David Morrell called the story "Lost in the Funhouse" "the most important, progressive, trend-defining American short fiction of its decade".

== Legacy ==
Though Barth's reputation is for his long novels, the stories "Night-Sea Journey", "Lost in the Funhouse", "Title" and "Life-Story" from Lost in the Funhouse are widely anthologized. Lost in the Funhouse has come to be seen to exemplify metafiction.

The story Petition was adapted into the play Me and My Shadow, written and directed by Vincent Murphy. The play starred Tim McDonough and Bill McCann as the Siamese twins, and was staged at Boston's Theater Works October 8 - November 21, 1981.

The story "Lost in the Funhouse" had an overt influence on David Foster Wallace in the final novella of Girl with Curious Hair, "Westward the Course of Empire Takes Its Way". The protagonist takes a creative writing course at a school near Johns Hopkins, taught by a Professor Ambrose, who says he "is a character in and the object of the seminal 'Lost in the Funhouse'".

== Sources ==
- Bell, Steven M. (1984). "Literature, Self-Consciousness, and Writing: The Example of Barth's Lost in the Funhouse". The International Fiction Review. 11 (2): 84–89.
- Caramello, Charles (1983). "Lost in the Funhouse and Other Refractions". Silverless Mirrors: Book, Self & Postmodern American Fiction. University Press of Florida. pp. 112–130. ISBN 978-0-8130-0772-4.
- Cohen, Samuel (2012). "To Wish to Try to Sing to the Next Generation: Infinite Jest's History". In Cohen, Samuel; Konstantinou, Lee (eds.). The Legacy of David Foster Wallace. University of Iowa Press. pp. 59–79. ISBN 978-1-60938-082-3.
- Dickstein, Morris (2002). Leopards in the Temple: The Transformation of American Fiction, 1945-1970. Harvard University Press. ISBN 978-0-674-00604-1.
- Elias, Amy J. (2011). Duvall, John N. (ed.). Postmodern Metafiction. Cambridge University Press. pp. 15–29. ISBN 9780521123471.
- Haen, Theo D' (2002). Bertens, Johannes Willem; Natoli, Joseph P. (eds.). Postmodernism: The Key Figures. John Wiley & Sons. pp. 32–37. ISBN 978-0-631-21797-8.
- Levitt, Morton (2002). Joyce and the Joyceans. Syracuse University Press. ISBN 9780815629306.
- Mahoney, Blair. "Borges: Influence and References: John Barth". /www.themodernword.com. Archived from the original on April 11, 2012.
- Maltby, Paul (1993). "Excerpts from Dissident Postmodernists". In Natoli, Joseph P.; Hutcheon, Linda (eds.). A Postmodern Reader. SUNY Press. pp. 519–537. ISBN 9780791416389.
- Martin, Terry J. (2001). "John Simmons Barth". A Reader's Companion to the Short Story in English. Greenwood Publishing Group. pp. 49–56. ISBN 978-0-313-29104-3.
- O'Donnell, Patrick (2010). The American Novel Now: Reading Contemporary American Fiction Since 1980. John Wiley & Sons. ISBN 9781405167574.
- Olster, Stacey (2009). Reminiscence and Re-Creation in Contemporary American Fiction. Cambridge University Press. ISBN 978-0-521-10980-2.
- Slethaug, Gordon (1993). "'Neither One nor Quite Two': Barth's Lost in the Funhouse". The Play of the Double in Postmodern American Fiction. SIU Press. pp. 121–150. ISBN 978-0-8093-1841-4.
- Simon, Sunka (2002). Mail-Orders: The Fiction of Letters in Postmodern Culture. SUNY Press. ISBN 9780791453506.
- Werlock, James P. (2010). The Facts on File Companion to the American Short Story. Infobase Publishing. ISBN 978-1-4381-2743-9.
- Zamora, Lois Parkinson (1989). Writing the Apocalypse: Historical Vision in Contemporary U.S. and Latin American Fiction. Cambridge University Press. ISBN 9780521362238.
