= Historiographic metafiction =

Postmodern literary genre

Historiographic metafiction is a genre of writing that incorporates metafiction into historical fiction. The term was coined by Canadian literary theorist Linda Hutcheon in the late 1980s.

== Concept ==
The genre is fiction which combines the literary device of metafiction with historical fiction. Works regarded as historiographic metafiction are also distinguished by frequent allusions to other artistic, historical and literary texts (i.e., intertextuality) in order to show the extent to which works of both literature and historiography are dependent on the history of discourse.

Although Hutcheon said that historiographic metafiction is not another version of the historical novel, there are scholars (e.g., Monika Fludernik) who describe it as such, citing that it is simply an updated late-twentieth-century version of the genre for its embrace of the conceptualizations of the novel and of the historical in the twentieth century.

The term is closely associated with works of postmodern literature, usually novels. According to Hutcheon's "A Poetics of Postmodernism", works of historiographic metafiction are "those well-known and popular novels which are both intensely self-reflexive and yet paradoxically also lay claim to historical events and personages". This is demonstrated in the genres that historiographic metafiction parodies, which it uses and abuses so that each parody constitutes a critique in the way it problematizes them. This process is also identified as "subversion" for the purpose of exposing suppressed histories to allow the redefinition of reality and truth.

== Examples ==
When devising the categorisation in her essay "Historiographic Metafiction", Linda Hutcheon first cited The French Lieutenant's Woman (1969), The Name of the Rose (1981), One Hundred Years of Solitude (1967) and Ragtime (1975) as examples, then breaking down the elements using V. (1963), Song of Solomon (1977), Yellow Back Radio Broke-Down (1969) as well as multiple of John Barth's novels: The Floating Opera (1956), The End of the Road (1958) and The Sot-Weed Factor (1960).

By seeking to represent both actual historical events from World War II while, at the same time, problematizing the very notion of doing exactly that, Kurt Vonnegut's Slaughterhouse-Five (1969) features a metafictional, "Janus-headed" perspective. Literary scholar Bran Nicol argues that Vonnegut's novel features "a more directly political edge to metafiction" compared to the writings of Robert Coover, John Barth, and Vladimir Nabokov.
