= The Sot-Weed Factor =

The Sot-Weed Factor is the title of two related literary works:

- "The Sot-Weed Factor" (poem), an 18th-century satirical poem by Ebenezer Cooke
- The Sot-Weed Factor (novel), a 1960 novel by John Barth
