= Senator Steiner =

Senator Steiner may refer to:

- Elizabeth Steiner (born 1963), Oregon State Senate
- Lewis Henry Steiner (1827–1892), Maryland State Senate

== See also ==
- Senator Stein (disambiguation)
