= Giles Goat-Boy =

1966 novel by John Barth

- First edition
- Author: John Barth
- Original title: Giles Goat-Boy or The Revised New Syllabus of George Giles our Grand Tutor
- Language: English
- Publisher: Doubleday
- Publication date: 1966
- Publication place: United States
- Media type: Print (hardcover)
- Pages: 710 pp
- OCLC: 15489838
- Dewey Decimal: 813/.54 19
- LC Class: PS3552.A75 G5 1987

Giles Goat-Boy (1966) is the fourth novel by American writer John Barth. It is a metafictional comic novel in which the universe is portrayed as a university campus in an elaborate allegory of both the hero's journey and the Cold War. Its title character is a human boy raised as a goat, who comes to believe he is the Grand Tutor, the predicted Messiah. The book was a surprise bestseller for the previously obscure Barth, and in the 1960s had a cult status. It marks Barth's leap into American postmodern fabulism.

== Overview ==
Giles Goat-Boy is one of Barth's most complex novels, a multi-layered narrative about the spiritual development of George Giles, goat boy. The book also functions as an allegory of the Cold War. The university in which the novel takes place is divided into a secretive and authoritarian East Campus and a more open West Campus. Speaking in 2001, John Barth described the novel this way:

It's a farcical allegory, sophomoric literally and figuratively. It’s about a universe that is a university, or a university that is a universe ... It goes on for too long, but among my objectives in writing the book was to have the chap, given his assignments here, attempt to solve them in a literal fashion, finds out he has to readdress them in a metaphorical fashion. He has to go through something which, while it’s in an exaggerated farce, I wanted to partake of the genuine aspects of the terror of Aristotelian catharsis, the catharsis through ... utter loss of self and its regainment.

Giles Goat-Boy marks Barth's emergence as a metafictional writer. The metafiction manifests itself in the "Publisher's Disclaimer" and "Cover-Letter to the Editors and Publisher" which preface the book, and which each try to pass off the responsibility for authorship onto another: the editors implicate Barth, who claims the text was given to him by a mysterious Giles Stoker or Stoker Giles, who in turn claims it was written by the automatic computer WESCAC. In the disclaimer the "editors" present their opinions on whether or not to publish the book, with responses ranging from repugnance to revelation, and some disparaging both the novel and its presumed author. The "author," JB, having amended the book to an unknown extent, claims it has become accidentally mixed up with a manuscript of his own. The book is further appended with a "Post-Tape" and then a postscript, both potentially spurious, further undermining the authority of the author.

"Here fornication, adultery, even rape, yea murder itself (not to mention self-deception, treason, blasphemy, whoredom, duplicity, and willful cruelty to others) are not only represented for our delectation but at times approved of and even recommended! On aesthetic grounds, too (though they pale before the moral), the work is objectionable; the rhetoric is extreme, the conceit and action wildly implausible, the interpretation of history shallow and patently biased, the narrative full of discrepancies and badly paced, at times tedious, more often excessive; the form, like the style, is unorthodox, unsymmetrical, inconsistent"

— Anonymous "editor" from Giles Goat Boy's preface

Bookworm host Michael Silverblatt argues that in the novel, “parody and burlesque and tragedy supersede themselves, transcend themselves.” Much of the humor and many events in the book employ a number of potentially offensive representations of blacks, Jews and women, and historical events such as the Holocaust are the subjects of absurdist humor. Life Magazine described Giles Goat-Boy as "a black comedy to offend everyone."

== Plot ==
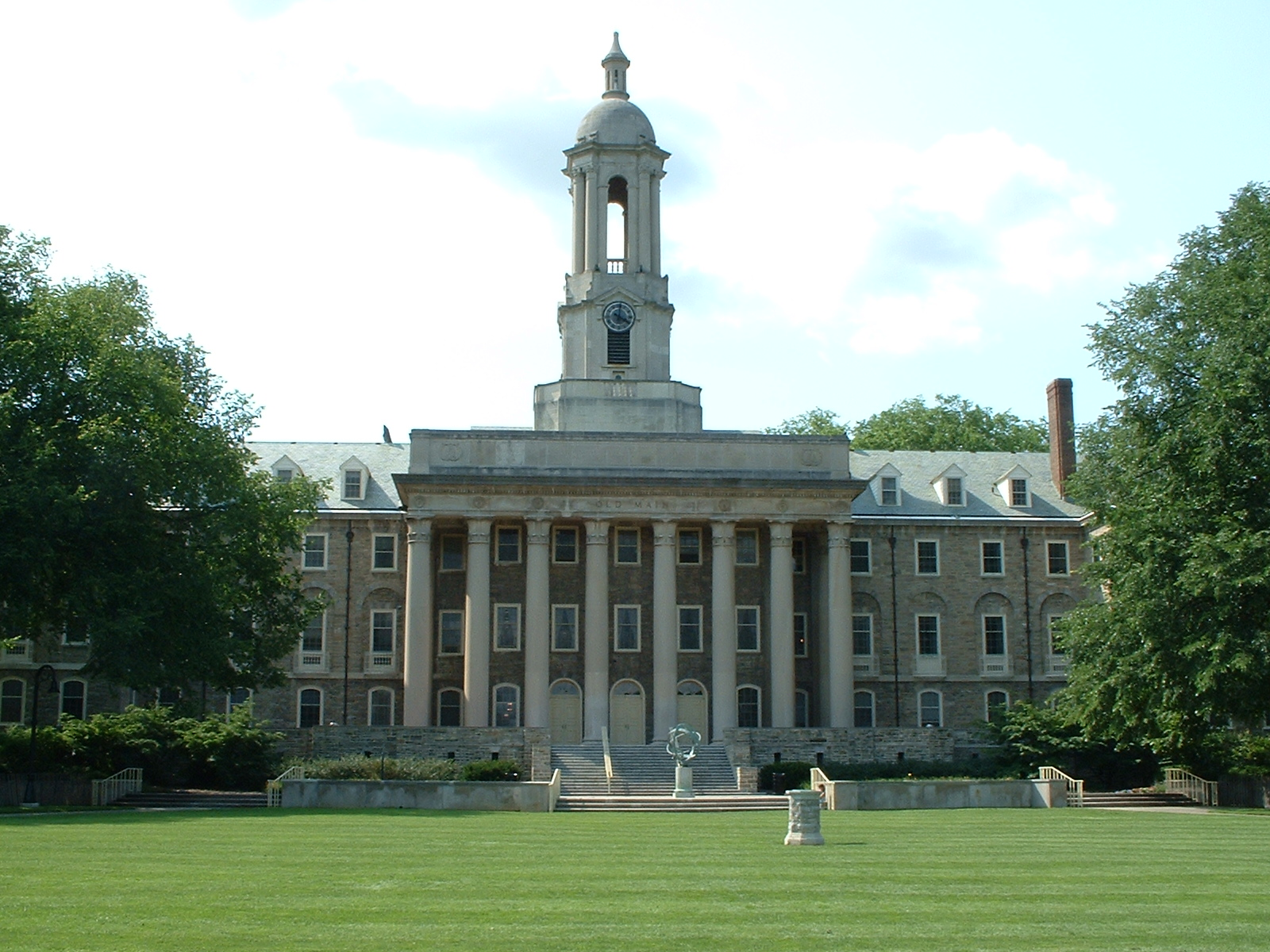
New Tammany College bears resemblance to Penn State.

George Giles is a boy raised as a goat who rises in life to be Grand Tutor (spiritual leader or messiah) of New Tammany College (the United States, or the Earth, or the Universe). He strives for (and achieves) herohood, in accordance with the hero myth as theorized by Lord Raglan and Joseph Campbell. The novel abounds in mythological and Christian allegories, as well as in allusions to the Cold War, 1960s academia, religion and spirituality. Rather than discovering his true identity, George ultimately chooses it, much like Ebeneezer Cooke does in Barth's previous novel, The Sotweed Factor.

The principle behind the allegorical renaming of key roles in the novel as roman à clef is that the Earth (or the Universe) is a university. Thus, for example, the founder of a religion or great religious leader becomes a Grand Tutor (in German Grosslehrer), and Barth renames specific leaders as well: Jesus Christ becomes Enos Enoch (meaning in Hebrew "The man who walked with God" or "humanity when it walked with God"), Moses becomes Moishe, Buddha becomes the original Sakhyan. As the founder of the maieutic method, Socrates becomes Maios; Plato (whose Greek name Platon means "broad-shouldered") becomes Scapulas (from scapula, shoulder-blade); Aristotle, as the coiner of the term entelekheia (lit. "having an end within," usually translated "entelechy," or glossed as the actualization of a potentiality), becomes Entelechus. The heroes of epic poems tend to be named after the Greek for "son of": Odysseus becomes Laertides (son of Laertes), Aeneas becomes Anchisides (son of Anchises), and so on. The subtitle The Revised New Syllabus means, in the novel's Universe=University allegory, a parodic rewriting of the New Testament. Satan is the Dean o' Flunks, and lives in the Nether Campus (hell); John the Baptist is John the Bursar; the Sermon on the Mount becomes the Seminar-on-the-Hill; the Last Judgment becomes the Final Examination. Among the parodic variations, a computer replaces the Holy Spirit, and an artificial insemination the Immaculate Conception.

As claimed in the opening prefaces, the text is "discovered" by the author. A hypertext encyclopedia also figures in the book, years before the invention of hypertext and three decades before the Web became part of society at large. The character Max Spielman is a parody of Ernst Haeckel, whose insight "ontogeny recapitulates phylogeny" is rephrased as "ontogeny recapitulates cosmogeny" and "proctoscopy repeats hagiography". The "riddle of the universe" is rephrased as "the riddle of the sphincters". The novel also contains a forty-page parody in small type of the full text of Oedipus Rex called Taliped Decanus. The digressive play-within-a-book is grossly disproportionate to the length of the book, parodying both Sophocles and Freud.

== Background ==
According to Barth, a reviewer of The Sot-Weed Factor saw in that book the pattern of the "Wandering Hero Myth", as described by Lord Raglan in The Hero (1936). This observation impelled Barth to begin research into comparative mythology and anthropology, which included reading Otto Rank's Myth of the Birth of the Ritual Hero (1909; 1914) and Joseph Campbell's The Hero with a Thousand Faces (1949). This led to Barth's invocation and playful deconstruction of the idea of the Ur-Myth in Giles Goat-Boy. Barth would delve further into the Hero in his essay "Mystery and Tragedy", and in his novels LETTERS (1979) and Once Upon a Time (1995).

[...]I say, Muse, spare me (at the desk, I mean) from social-historical responsibility, and in the last analysis from every other kind as well, except artistic.

— Barth, "Muse, Spare Me" (1965)

In the 1987 preface to the novel Barth declared that his first three novels formed a "loose trilogy of novels", after completing which he felt ready to move into new territory. He called Giles Goat-Boy the first of his Fabulist novels, in contrast to the 1950s-style black comedy displayed in the earlier novels. He declared in a 1965 essay, "Muse, Spare Me", that he desired to be spared from social-historical responsibility in order to focus on aesthetic concerns. The Sot-Weed Factor was released in paperback the year before Giles Goat-Boy, and increased interest in his work shortly before Giles Goat-Boy was released.

Giles Goat-Boy was released the same year as a number of landmark works in the early history of postmodern American literature, most notably Pynchon's The Crying of Lot 49. Brian McHale has seen 1966 as being a year in which the new postmodern aesthetic had definitively arrived, a year in which metafiction, poststructuralism and other concepts strongly related to postmodernism made their mark in the US.

Barth, himself a university professor, also set The End of the Road on a university campus.

== Reception ==
Giles Goat-Boy was on The New York Times bestseller list in 1966 for 12 weeks, but was coldly received in England.

The novel was initially reviewed enthusiastically, and "inspired critical awe and cultish popular devotion." However, by 1984, Robert Alter referred to the book as "reced[ing] into the detritus of failed experiments in American fiction", calling it "little more than an inflated translation game ... so brittle a cleverness that it constantly reveals the tediousness of the novel's informing conception." While it enjoyed a cult status in the 1960s, the novel has since become one of Barth's least-read works. John Gardner called the book a morally "empty but well-made husk." Gore Vidal called it "a very bad prose-work", dismissing it as one of a number of overly academic "teachers' novel[s]."

In a 1967 article, science fiction author Judith Merril praised the novel for its sophistication in handling sexual material. Giles Goat-Boy is considered by many to be Barth's best work.

Barth's own statements on the primacy of aesthetics in his writing have tended to obscure the book's otherwise obvious politics, particularly the 1960s Cold War allegory. Robert Scholes was among the early critics who dismissed the elaborate allegory as irrelevant, and critics since then have emphasized the role of the hero and the quest in the book's construction. In the 1980s, Barth revisited his 1960s works and came to acknowledge their historical context, including a new preface to the 1987 edition of Giles Goat-Boy.

== Legacy ==
In 1967, after the success of Giles Goat-Boy, Barth was able to release a revised one-volume edition of his first two novels (The Floating Opera and The End of the Road) that restore the books' original, darker endings.

Barth has come to see Giles Goat-Boy as "the first American postmodernist novel," an assertion picked up by many of his critics and biographers, but not universally accepted. The novel was the central exhibit of Robert Scholes' The Fabulators (1967), a study of a tendency in contemporary writers to eschew realism in fiction.

== See also ==
- 1966 in literature
- American literature
