= Max Raab =

American film producer

Max Louis Raab
- In Rittenhouse Square
- Born: Max Louis Raab; June 9, 1926; Philadelphia, Pennsylvania, USA
- Died: February 21, 2008 (aged 81); Philadelphia, Pennsylvania, USA
- Occupations: Clothing businessman and film producer

Max Louis Raab (June 9, 1926 – February 21, 2008) was an American clothing businessman and film producer.

Raab popularized the "preppy" aesthetic in American women's fashion in the 1950s and 1960s. As a film producer, he was responsible for bringing "A Clockwork Orange" to the screen.

== Early life ==
Max Louis Raab was born to Herman and Fanny Kessler Raab on June 9, 1926 in Philadelphia, Pennsylvania. His mother died when he was twelve. Raab grew up in the city's Tioga neighborhood, attending Rutgers Preparatory School and the Wooster Academy.

Raab was drafted into the U.S. Army during World War II and served in Germany. At the end of the war, he served in the allied occupation forces in Japan. After his military discharge, Max began his career in the apparel business at his father's blouse company, Morgan Raab.

== Career ==
=== Clothing ===
In the late 1940s, Raab realized that women's fashions were changing. American women's fashion was being increasingly dominated by teenage girls and adults with upwardly mobile tastes. In contrast, Morgan Raab produced low quality, unstylish blouses. In response, Raab started manufacturing man-tailored button down shirts at Morgan Raab. The clothing line was a great success.

In 1958, Raab and his brother Norman started The Villager, a clothing line that would define preppy Ivy League fashion for decades. The popularity of his clothing led the New York Times to label him the "dean of the prep look. The Villager quickly grew to be one of the preeminent brands in American sportswear, only to diminish in popularity with the advent of the late 1960s counterculture and attendant styles in fashion. During this time, Raab also launched the Rooster Tie Company and became known for his unconventional use of unusual, non-traditional fabrics in ties.

In 1974, Raab founded the J.G. Hook clothing line. He had decided that it was time to revive the classic prep style of the 1950s. He also created a new necktie company, Tango, that again used unconventional materials for his ties.

In 1998, after growing J.G. Hook into a $100 million empire, Max sold the business.

=== Film ===
In the 1960s, filmmaker Frank Perry asked Raab if he would donate the wardrobe for his low-budget film (David and Lisa). Raab agreed with the stipulation that he could watch the filming of the movie. After three months of watching the creation of David and Lisa, Raab decided to enter the movie business.

He purchased the film rights to John Barth's novel End of the Road. With the help of director Aram Avakian and writer Terry Southern, Raab adapted the novel into a film.

Raab then purchased the film rights to Anthony Burgess' controversial novel A Clockwork Orange. However, when Raab presented the concept to the major film studios, they all turned it down. In addition, Raab had wanted members of the Beatles to be in the movie cast; they declined also. When director Stanley Kubrick showed interest in "A Clockwork Orange", Warner Brothers decided to produce the film, making Raab an executive producer.

Raab's next film was Walkabout, another critical success. Raab produced several other films, including Lions Love with writer and director Agnès Varda.

At age 73, Raab made his directorial debut with the documentary film STRUT!. Having watched Philadelphia's annual New Year's Day Mummers parade since he was a child, Raab set out to capture the world of the Mummers. STRUT! featured music from turn-of-the-century ragtime and Dixieland hymns to Broadway show tunes and pop music hits. Raab also produced the film's soundtrack.

Raab then collaborated with filmmaker Robert Downey Sr. on the documentary film Rittenhouse Square. The movie was about a year in the life of Rittenhouse Square, one of Philadelphia's original park squares. It was an impressionistic and music filled film that showed the intersections of people's lives in this public space. "Max Raab is the most inspired producer I've ever worked with and the funniest. His music choices were always impeccable", says Downey.

In his last two years, Raab and Downey again began work on a musical documentary on the composer Kurt Weill and his singer/actress Lotte Lenya. Raab died before the project was completed, but his wife and Downey were planning to finish it.

=== Other activities ===
Raab also owned theaters and restaurants, and started a small entertainment magazine. As a young man, he opened a car lot on North Broad Street. In his final year, Raab opened a small shop and website selling collectible model cars, sailboats, airplanes, tin toys and other items.

Raab also served as a mentor to many young people in the clothing industry.

Raab's hobbies included sailing catboats and catamarans along the Jersey Shore and in the Caribbean.

== Death ==
After a ten-year struggle with Parkinson's disease, Max Raab died in Philadelphia in 2008.
