= Bad Subjects =

- Categories: News magazine
- Frequency: Quarterly
- First issue: 1992
- Final issue: 2017
- Country: United States
- Language: English
- ISSN: 1468-2656

Bad Subjects (more formally Bad Subjects: Political Education For Everyday Life and sometimes The Bad Subjects Collective) was a research collaborative that operated generally out of California as part of the open access electronic publishing cooperative EServer.org. Together, the collaborative created and published an online zine of cultural and political criticism to promote public education about the political implications of everyday life. It was founded at UC Berkeley in September 1992 as a collection of leftist critiques of identity politics and popular culture written by college students and published as a Gopher service. Bad Subjects may have been the longest continuously running publication on the internet.

== History ==
The cultural magazine Bad Subjects was started at University of California, Berkeley in September 1992 by founding editors Joe Sartelle, Annalee Newitz, and Charlie Bertsch. They were joined by John Brady and Joel Schalit in 1994. By 1996, after founding contributor Steven Rubio built a Gopher site, Bad Subjects was both an online and hard copy academic publication.

In 1998, Bad Subjects was identified as a celebrated cultural studies magazine on the Internet. Also in the same year, Bad Subjects founded a small educational nonprofit corporation, to promote the progressive use of new media and print publications. The group co-authored two books, entitled Bad Subjects: Political Education for Everyday Life and Collective Action: A Bad Subjects Anthology.

In 2001, the webzine's popularity had grown to where it was seen by some as the West Coast's answer to the Illinois-based journal The Baffler.

The collective published 4-6 issues per year and also featured regular editorials and reviews of a wide range of media. The site offered twenty-five years of back content for free online.

The stated goal of Bad Subjects was to revitalize what it termed "a progressive politics in retreat". The group claimed to challenge political dogma by encouraging readers to think about the political dimension to all aspects of everyday life and sought to broaden the audience for leftist and progressive writing, through a commitment to accessibility and contemporary relevance. Bad Subjects had a large number of contributors, contributing editors and production team members, including Ana Marie Cox, Arturo Aldama, Joe Lockard, Jonathan Sterne, Matt Wray, Megan Shaw Prelinger, Tamara Watkins, Joseph Natoli, Mike Mosher, Molly Hankwitz, Adam Cornford, and Thomas Powell.

The last issue was published in early 2017. After a period of problems with its presentation and navigation, the site disappeared without explanation in 2019.
