= Taleh Shahsuvarly =

Azerbaijani writer (born 1977)

Taleh Shahsuvarly (Azerbaijani: Taleh Şahsuvarlı) is an Azerbaijani author, journalist and political analyst.

== Biography ==
Taleh Shahsuvarly was born in Barda region of Karabakh) in 1977. He graduated from the philosophy faculty of Baku State University.

His literature work "Re-incernation" ("Canlanma") is the first historiographical metafiction published in Azerbaijan.
