= The End of the Road =

Book by John Barth

First edition cover by Robert Watson

The End of the Road is the second novel by American writer John Barth, published first in 1958, and then in a revised edition in 1967. The irony-laden black comedy's protagonist Jacob Horner suffers from a nihilistic paralysis he calls "cosmopsis"—an inability to choose a course of action from all possibilities. As part of a schedule of unorthodox therapies, Horner's nameless Doctor has him take a teaching job at a local teachers' college. There Horner befriends the super-rational Joe Morgan and his wife Rennie. The trio become entangled in a love triangle, with tragic results. The story deals with issues controversial at the time, such as sexuality, racial segregation, and abortion.

Barth and his critics often pair the novel with its predecessor, The Floating Opera (1956); both were written in 1955, and they are available together in a one-volume edition. Both are philosophical novels; The End of the Road continues with the conclusions about absolute values made by the protagonist of The Floating Opera, and takes these ideas "to the end of the road". Barth wrote both novels in a realistic mode, in contrast to Barth's better-known metafictional, fabulist, and postmodern works from the 1960s and later, such as Lost in the Funhouse (1968) and LETTERS (1979).

Critics have been divided over whether Barth identified with the book's protagonist, who retreats from emotion and human relations through language and intellectual analysis; Jake prefers to keep even his sexual relations impersonal. Language is presented as a distortion of experience, yet nevertheless unavoidable. In his later novels Barth forefronted the artifice in his writing, beginning with The Sot-Weed Factor (1960), a work Barth conceived as the last of a "loose trilogy of novels".

A 1970 film loosely based on the novel stars James Earl Jones, Stacy Keach and Harris Yulin in their earliest feature roles. It was rated X, in part because of a graphic abortion scene.

== Publishing history ==
While teaching at Penn State, Barth embarked on a cycle of 100 stories he called Dorchester Tales; he abandoned it halfway through to begin his first two published novels. He completed both The Floating Opera and The End of the Road in 1955. Appleton-Century-Crofts published The Floating Opera in 1956, but sales were not strong enough to encourage the publisher to pick up Barth's next offering, which was felt to be too similar to the first book. Doubleday published The End of the Road in 1958; it received only marginally more attention than The Floating Opera. A revised edition in 1967 restored material cut from the first edition, and had a new introduction by Barth. Anchor Books collected these two novels in a single-volume edition in 1988; in his foreword (Note: This foreword also appears in Barth's essay collection Further Fridays (1995).) to it Barth states he originally titled the book What To Do Until the Doctor Comes, but Doubleday editor Edward Aswell persuaded him to change it, as he "feared the novel would be mistaken for a treatise on first aid".

== Background ==
The story narrates the first-person confession of Jacob Horner in the form of a therapeutic psychodrama. Horner writes on October 4, 1955, of events in 1951–53.

Barth spent most of his adult life teaching at universities. As in many of Barth's novels, the setting and characters of The End of the Road have an academic background; most of the story takes place on a university campus. The novel tackles controversial contemporary issues such as abortion (which had yet to achieve wide social acceptance) and racial segregation.

The End of the Road can be viewed with The Floating Opera (1956) as forming the early, existentialist or nihilist phase of Barth's writing career. This phase was realistic in a modernist sense; it lacked the fantastic elements that manifested themselves in Barth's experimental phase that began with The Sot-Weed Factor (1960). Both novels, while displaying a distinctive style, followed conventions readers expected from a novel, and were part of a realist trend in American novels during the 1940s and 1950s. As The Floating Opera closes, its protagonist, Todd Andrews, concludes that life has no absolute values but that there are relative values that are "no less 'real', for ... being relative". Barth has said he wrote The End of the Road to refute this worldview by carrying "all non-mystical value-thinking to the end of the road", and that the second novel was a "nihilistic tragedy" paired with the "nihilistic comedy" of the first. Barth also sees the book as the second of a "loose trilogy of novels" that concludes with The Sot-Weed Factor, after which he embarked on the fabulist Giles Goat-Boy (1966).

== Plot ==
In a sense, I am Jacob Horner.

— Opening of The End of the Road

Jacob "Jake" Horner suffers from "cosmopsis"—an inability to choose from among all possible choices he can imagine. Having abandoned his graduate studies at Johns Hopkins University, he becomes completely paralyzed in the Pennsylvania Railroad Station in Baltimore just after his 28th birthday, An unnamed African-American doctor who claims to specialize in such conditions takes him under his care at his private therapy center, the Remobilization Farm.

The state of Maryland (in red)

The story takes place in Wicomico County, Maryland (in red).

As part of his schedule of therapies, Jake takes a job teaching at Wicomico State Teachers College, where he becomes friends with history teacher Joe Morgan and his wife Rennie. Joe and Jake enjoy intellectual sparring in a "duel of articulations". The philosophical Morgans have a marriage in which everything must be articulated, and in which "the parties involved are able to take each other seriously"—and to Joe "seriously" means sometimes beating his wife. The Doctor prescribes Jake "mythotherapy", in which he is to read Sartre and to assign himself "masks" to abolish the ego, inducing action through the adoption of symbolic roles. Jake seeks out a woman, Peggy Rankin, whom he had earlier picked up; when she rebuffs him, he succeeds in seducing her again by striking her, in imitation of Joe.

While Joe busies himself with his Ph.D. dissertation, he encourages Rennie to teach Jake horseback riding. During their rides, Rennie and Jake talk at length about the Morgans' unusual relationship. After returning from one such outing, Jake encourages a resistant Rennie to spy on her husband. She is convinced that "real people" like Joe are not "any different when they are alone"; such people have "[n]o mask. What you see of them is authentic." What Rennie sees of Joe while spying disorients her and her vision of him—he masturbates, picks his nose, makes faces, and sputters gibberish syllables to himself.

Unmoored from the anchor that Joe has been for her, Rennie commits adultery with Jake; when Joe discovers it, he insists they maintain the affair, in an effort to discover the reasons for his wife's unfaithfulness. Rennie discovers she is pregnant, but cannot be sure whether Joe or Jake is the father. The Morgans visit Jake, Joe with Colt .45 in hand. Rennie insists on having an abortion, or she will commit suicide. Under an assumed name, Jake hunts for an abortionist; when Peggy refuses to help him find one, he strikes her. Unable to find a physician who will agree to the procedure, Jake turns to the Doctor. Rennie dies from the botched abortion. His relativist "cosmopsis" confirmed, Jake reverts to his paralysis. Two years later, as part of his Scriptotherapy on the relocated Remobilization Farm, he writes of his Wicomico experience.

== Themes and motifs ==
The End of the Road is rich in recurring metaphor. In the opening chapter, while in the Doctor's Progress and Advice Room, Jake finds himself in the awkward position of having to choose the manner in which he will sit, with his choices restricted. Jake notes that Rennie has made the same sort of choice-that-is-not-a-choice by remaining married to Joe, and that Joe, in opposition to his philosophies, has to make a "choice" about Rennie's adultery and pregnancy.

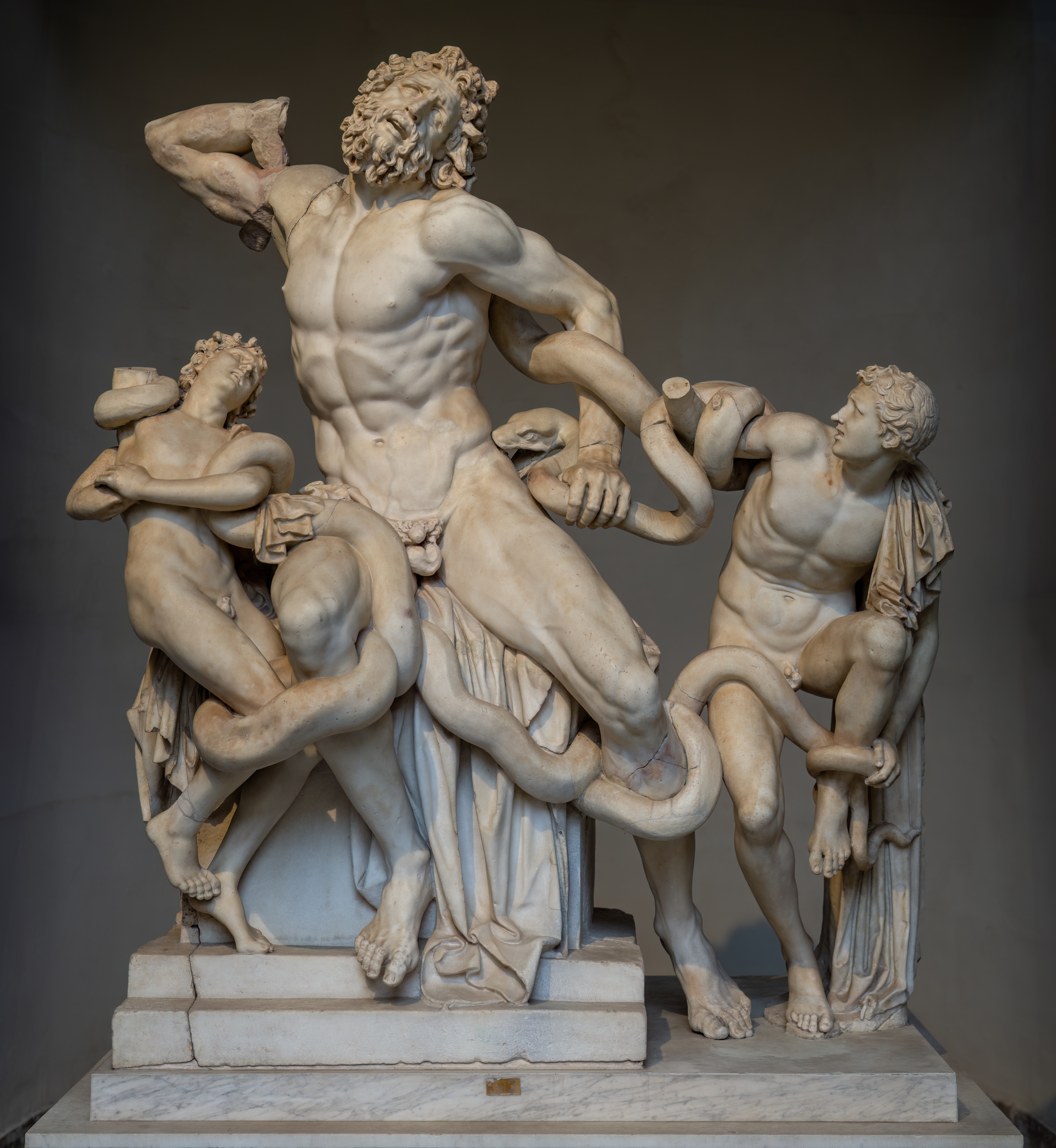
Jake Horner frequently consults the tortured face of a Laocoön bust.

On his mantel Jake keeps a bust of Laocoön sculpted by a dead uncle. As Laocoön was bound by serpents, Jake feels himself bound into inaction "by the serpents Knowledge and Imagination, which ... no longer tempt but annihilate". This is reflected in Laocoön's grimace, which Jake frequently consults and interprets according to his mood—with admiration, frustration, or indifference. After the disaster of Rennie's abortion, Jake tells the bust, "We've come too far", and abandons it along with his job, car and apartment.

Barth coined the term "cosmopsis" in The End of the Road for a sense of seeing and comprehending all available paths of action and the futility of choosing among them. Jake expands on Jean-Paul Sartre's famous existentialist line "existence precedes essence", saying "existence not only precedes essence: in the case of human beings it rather defies essence." The Doctor tells Jake, "Choosing is existence: to the extent that you don't choose, you don't exist." To cope with inability to make decisions, the Doctor prescribes three therapies: the arbitrary principles of Sinistrality ("If the alternatives are side by side, choose the one on the left"), Antecedence ("if they're consecutive in time, choose the earlier") and Alphabetic Priority ("choose the alternative whose name begins with the earlier letter of the alphabet").

The Doctor prescribes "Mythotherapy" to move Jake beyond his paralysis by giving him arbitrary decision-making principles and having him take on identities by wearing "masks"—assuming roles. He tells Jake "fiction isn't a lie at all, but a true representation of the distortion that everyone makes of life". These distortions—an approach Jake calls "mythoplastic"—people employ to with the arbitrary conditions life thrusts upon them. According to Jake, it is the imagination that enables one to cope, and its lack in the Morgans was to lead to their destruction.

Both Jake and Joe use their intellects to distance themselves from their emotions; both see others as specimens to be observed rather than as peers to relate to. Only when overcome with emotion does Jake briefly shed his self-consciousness, which he makes sure to quickly regain.

Jake is uncomfortable "with women who took their sexual transports too seriously", and prefers his sexual relations to be impersonal; the Doctor recommends he take up masturbation and avoid the complications of marriage or girlfriends. Jake's attitude toward sex is paralleled by his impersonal attitude to human relations in general.

Horse symbols permeate the text. Rennie, an accomplished rider, and her husband whip their heads back and forth horse-like when they laugh. Joe is fond of the epithet horseshit when pointing out nonsense. His surname, Morgan, is the name of an American breed of horse. Joe's consistent sureness, his "rationality and absence of 'craft or guile'", according to Thomas Schaub, seem to echo the Houyhnhnms, the race of rational horses in Jonathan Swift's Gulliver's Travels.

The novel's opening line recalls the "Call me Ishmael" opening of Herman Melville's Moby-Dick. Choices of wording such as "inscrutable" and "wrinkled brow" appear to Thomas H. Schaub to be deliberate echoes from Melville's novel.

== Style ==
"Maybe the guy who fools himself least is the one who admits that we're all just kidding."

— Jacob Horner, The End of the Road

A virtuoso stylist, Barth concerns himself with deflating the pretensions of his characters. He displays an attitude toward sexuality that is free from taboo. Irony and black comedy are plentiful, but come to a sudden emotional halt with the crisis in the abortion room.

The End of the Road is in a realistic style that may come as a surprise to those familiar only with Barth's later books. The narrator avoids naturalistic descriptions of his surroundings, and most other details, and describes the physical aspects of life (especially of women) with disgust or contempt. He indulges in occasional bursts of eloquence: "A turning down of dinner damped, in ways subtle past knowing, manic keys on the flute of me, least pressed of all, which for a moment had shrilled me rarely". The realism is not a conventional everyday realism: the situations themselves are fantastic, though plausible.

Naturalism makes a significant appearance in the 12th chapter, in which Jake witnesses Rennie's botched abortion and finds himself unable to conquer his emotions with reason. Jac Tharpe saw this change of style as evidence that the chapter had originated as a separate story that was integrated into the novel; Charles B. Harris sees the "sudden use of naturalistic details" as taking on an "integral function" in the book, one prepared by the previous chapter with the subtle introduction of some passing naturalistic detail.

Though he shows concern for verisimilitude—particularly in the immediacy of the abortion scene—Barth at times draws attention to the artifice of the writing. Jake recounts long conversations with Rennie or Joe that he points out never occurred as written—he has ordered and condensed their content. Jake also expresses a belief that was to manifest itself in Barth's later approach to writing: "To turn experience into speech, that is, to classify, to conceptualize, to grammarize, to syntactify it—is always a betrayal of it, a falsification of it".

== Primary characters ==
Jacob "Jake" Horner
Constantly aware of the many possibilities in life, Jake is paralyzed by his inability to choose from among them. In his own words, he is able "to maintain with perfect unenthusiasm contradictory, or at least polarized, opinions at once on a given subject". On occasion Jake finds himself in an empty mental state, free of mood, personality, or motivation; he calls these times "weatherless", after a dream he had in which attempts to find the weather forecast lead him to a meteorologist who informs him that the forecast is "no weather". He fills the void of his weatherlessness by occupying himself with rocking in his chair or singing the "Pepsi-Cola hits the spot" advertising jingle to himself. Completely arbitrary, Horner seems the epitome of unreason to Joe Morgan's ultra-rationality, though Rennie comments that he and Joe "work from a lot of the same rational premises". He is scrupulously attentive to details, recording the possible positions of his arms and legs in the Progress and Advice Room; making note of who was on top first, or on which shoulder he was bitten, and which brand of condoms were used in his affair with Rennie; even parsing the grammar of sentences for the reader. He submits even his emotions to the ordering processes of reason. The name "Jake Horner" is reminiscent of the rationalizing Little Jack Horner, as well as of the horns of a cuckold.
Joe Morgan

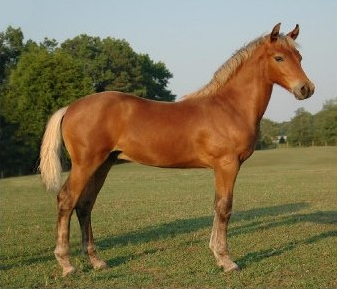
Horse imagery permeates the text. Joe Morgan's surname invokes a breed of horse, the Morgan (pictured).

Joe is a history teacher and scoutmaster. He is consistent, decisive, rational, and lacking "craft or guile", and thus feels entirely certain of everything. An existentialist, he believes he has rid himself of arbitrary values and arrived at his essence. He believes that if something exists, it can be articulated. He recognizes the relativism of his value system, and that an ultimate system of values cannot be reached through logic. He maintains that "the most a man can ever do is be right from his point of view ... He's got to expect conflict from people or institutions who are also right from their points of view, but whose points of view are different from his."

Joe's definition of marriage requires that "the parties involved be able to take each other seriously". Despite Jake's making fun of Rennie, he likes Jake for appearing to take her seriously, as he believes few men take women seriously. He is voyeuristic in the rationalized probing of his wife for the minute details of her ongoing affair with Jake.

Rennie Morgan
Rennie is married to Joe, whom she looks up to. Joe has twice knocked her out in the past. Jake describes her as a "clumsy animal". Her birth name is Renée, a name signifying rebirth, and her maiden name was MacMahon—"reborn son of man", perhaps signifying rebirth in Joe's image, according to Thomas Schaub. Both Joe and Jake observe and treat her like a patient.
The Doctor
Described by Jake as "bald, dark-eyed, and dignified", the unnamed, elderly African-American Doctor specializes in immobility and paralysis at his Remobilization Farm in Vineland, New Jersey. He is an existential ultra-pragmatist and insists Jake rely on empirical facts rather than logic in making decisions, and echoes Wittgenstein's proposition from Tractatus Logico-Philosophicus, "The world is everything that is the case". Because of racial segregation that would not end until 1954, he is unable to buy himself a cup of coffee at the bus station. He works outside of the law, and is unable to give Rennie an abortion in the safety of a hospital.
Peggy Rankin
Rankin is Jake's "Forty-Year-Old-Pickup", a local schoolteacher Jake has picked up like "a bird who perches on the muzzle of [his] gun". in nearby Ocean City. In imitation of Joe, Jake hits her, once to woo her, the other time when she will not help him find an abortionist.

== Reception and legacy ==
A 1958 Time magazine review called The End of the Road "that rarity of U.S. letters—a true novel of ideas". In the Chicago Review in 1959, reviewer David Kerner called it an "ideological farce", a genre he considered a "special type" with few contemporary examples. (Note: Kerner names Nigel Dennis's 1955 novel Cards of Identity as one example of this genre.) George Bluestone in 1960 used the term "serious farce", calling it an emerging new genre. Kerner praised Barth's "coherence of ... allegory", "depth of ... feeling for ideology", and "excellence of intention", but argues that the work's realistic style is at odds with the farcical, two-dimensional characters, who lack a "human and social setting" to give them roundedness and credibility. To Thomas LeClair in 1973, the novel was Barth's "purest presentation of the comedy of intellectual abstraction".

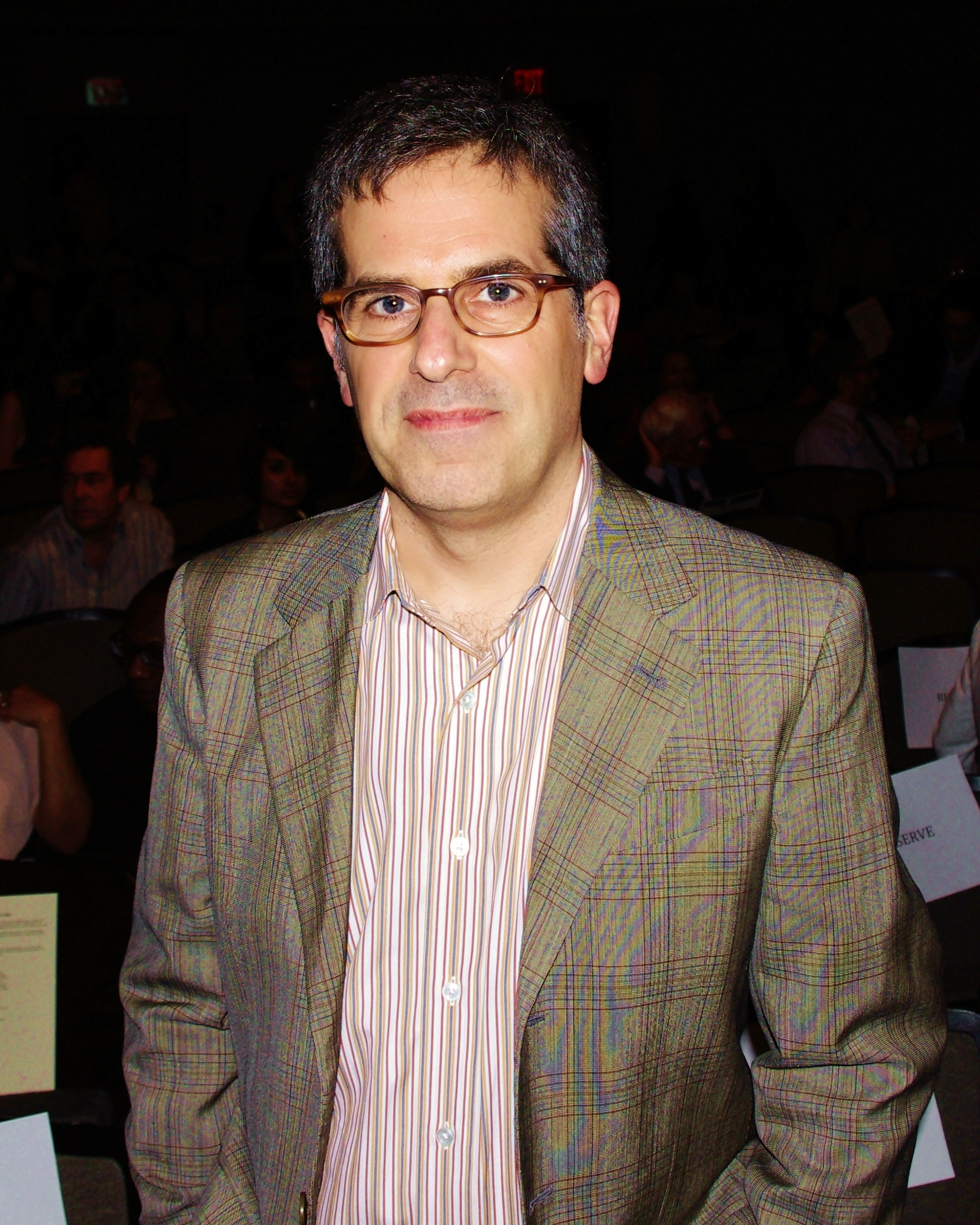
The End of the Road was an inspiration for the 1997 novel As She Climbed Across the Table by Jonathan Lethem (pictured).

As part of a cast that includes characters from each of Barth's first six books the characters Jake and Joe resurface in Barth's 1979 novel LETTERS on the Doctor's Remobilization Farm, relocated to Fort Erie, Ontario. The End of the Road is presented in that book as a discarded manuscript Jake had titled What I Did Until the Doctor Came. Barth's fictitious version of himself in LETTERS uses the manuscript as the basis for The End of the Road; decades later he writes to Jake of his appropriation, and of the film based on the book, calling the latter "as false to the novel as was the novel to your Account and your Account to the actual Horner–Morgan–Morgan triangle".

Jonathan Lethem wrote of the influence The End of the Road had on his novel As She Climbed Across the Table (1997), which also involves a love triangle in an academic setting. In Lethem's novel, the narrator, in a position similar to Joe Morgan's, experiences the dilemma of "losing a woman to a rival who", like Jake Horner, "refuses to provide any fixed identity to hate, compete with, or understand".

=== Critical views ===
As The Floating Opera and The End of the Road make little display of the metafictional formal prowess of Barth's later works, critics often overlook them. Some consider these first two novels little more than apprentice works, while others see them in light of the later works, removed from their historical and social context.

Critics have been divided on whether Barth identified with the narrator's beliefs; this appeared probable to John Gardner, Richard W. Noland, and Tony Tanner, while Beverly Gross and Campbell Tatham believed the tragic ending demonstrates the contrary. Philosopher Robert C. Solomon included excerpts from the book in a collection on existentialism. Gardner objected to the book's absurdist philosophy, "vulgarities of style", and a "touch of life-hate which reveals itself in the author's fascination with the ugly, the disgusting"; Gardner found this "fascination" perplexing, as "in other respects Barth seems all sunshine and good cheer". (Note: Gardner considered the 1958 edition to be "more moral".) Christopher Conti saw a "moral-satiric design" also found in Nabokov's Lolita (1955) and Gardner's Grendel (1971), in which the reader is meant to see through the moral failings of the novels' "monstrous narrators".

"Rennie loved me, then, and hated me as well! Let us say she x-ed me, and know better than to smile."

— Jacob Horner, The End of the Road

Charles B. Harris sees Jake's and Joe's intellectualism as a Freudian obsessional neurosis. To Freud, he writes, the source of such a condition lies in "the chronic existence of love and hatred, both directed towards the same person and both of the highest degree of intensity". Rennie expresses this overtly when she tells Jake, "[I]f I love you at all, I don't just love you. I swear, along with it I honestly and truly hate your God-damned guts!"

To Dirk Vanderbeke, the "masks" the Doctor prescribes mask the "essential emptiness" of egoless existential philosophy. He writes that, anticipating Michel Foucault's theories of the self in The Archaeology of Knowledge (1974), all the characters wear self-defining masks that they at some point let slip, and that Jake's paralysis stems from an inability to choose a role with which to participate in society. Vanderbeke writes, "Mythotherapy is not simply the cure for Jacob's state of mind but the general mode of human existence."

Cynthia Davis sees the women in Barth's early works as lacking the choice-making, identity-forming dynamism of the men; Rennie has no viewpoint of her own, only ones formed by Joe or Jake. Davis states, "Only as bodies do Barth's women defy male control: in sex, in pregnancy, in death." To Judith Wilt, Rennie appears to assert herself in a seeming determination to die on the abortion table, cutting herself with the curette and inhaling her own vomit; there is no evidence in the book beyond her own assertion that Rennie had ever been pregnant. Barth returned to the subject of abortion in Sabbatical in 1982.

To literary theorist Michael LeMahieu, Barth's first two novels confront a logical positivist "separation of facts and values" common in postwar American fiction. The End of the Road displays "aesthetic resistance to the philosophical realism it desires results in a state of narrative, logical, affective, and ethical exhaustion at the end of the book". The narrative conflict echoes an ethical conflict between the characters' value systems that Joe insists is inevitable.

== Adaptations ==
The End of the Road is the only work of Barth's to have been adapted to film. Director Aram Avakian's loose adaptation End of the Road (1970) stars James Earl Jones, Stacy Keach and Harris Yulin in their earliest feature roles. Graphic scenes earned the film an X rating, such as those of the botched abortion and of what Barth calls a "man rapes chicken" scene not found in the book. Barth and critics widely panned the movie; Barth wrote disdainfully about it in the introduction to the 1988 single-volume edition of The Floating Opera and The End of the Road. Academics Ken Pellow and Rita Hug opined that the linguistic, literary and philosophical aspects of the book made it difficult to adapt; they argued that Jake Horner's frequent speaking to the reader is key to the book's effectiveness but does not lend itself to film.

Director Paul Edwards made a stage adaptation of the novel for Roadworks Productions in 1993, with John Mozes as Jake, Kate Fry as Rennie, and Patrick McNulty as Joe. Edwards makes Jake's immobility central to the play; it opens with him seated and writing, and closes with him doing the same until the audience has left. The production won a Joseph Jefferson Award in 1993.
