= John Peisley =

John Peisley may refer to:

- John Peisley (politician)
- John Peisley (bushranger)

== See also ==
- John Paisley (disambiguation)
