= Senator Stine =

Senator Stine may refer to:

- Jeremy Stine (born 1980), Louisiana State Senate
- Katie Kratz Stine (born 1956), Kentucky State Senate

== See also ==
- Senator Stein (disambiguation)
- Senator Stineman (disambiguation)
