= LETTERS =

1979 novel by John Barth

- First edition
- Author: John Barth
- Cover artist: Lynn Hollyn & David Gatti
- Language: English
- Genre: Epistolary novel
- Publisher: Putnam
- Publication date: 1979
- Publication place: United States
- Media type: Print
- Pages: 772
- ISBN: 0436036746
- OCLC: 16495246

LETTERS is an epistolary novel by the American writer John Barth, published in 1979. It consists of a series of letters in which Barth and the characters of his other books interact.

In addition to the Author and Germaine Pitt (or 'Lady Amherst', unrelated to any of Barth's previous novels), the correspondents are Todd Andrews (from The Floating Opera), Jacob Horner (from The End of the Road), A.B. Cook (a descendant of Burlingame in The Sot-Weed Factor), Jerome Bray (associated with Giles Goat-Boy and Chimera) and Ambrose Mensch (from Lost in the Funhouse).

The book is subtitled "An old time epistolary novel by seven fictitious drolls & dreamers each of which imagines himself factual." The structure is such that when the first character of each of the letters in the book are placed on a calendar according to their dates, and the individual months are turned sideways, they spell out the subtitle. In addition, the marked dates spell out the word "LETTERS."
