= Ebenezer Cooke (poet) =

English/ American poet

Ebenezer Cooke (c. 1665 – c. 1732) was a poet from the Thirteen Colonies. Probably born in London, he became a lawyer in Maryland, then an English colony, where he wrote a number of poems including one that some scholars consider the first American satire: "The Sot-Weed Factor: Or, a Voyage to Maryland. A Satyr" (1708). He was fictionalized by John Barth as the comically innocent protagonist of The Sot-Weed Factor, a novel in which a series of fantastic misadventures leads Cooke to write his poem.

== Life ==
Little is known about the life of Cook (sometimes spelled "Cooke", but spelled Cook in his published works). It is known that Cooke, like the persona of his poem, voyaged to Maryland as a young man. He entered the bar of Prince George's County, Maryland, and practiced law before returning to London by 1694. He later returned to Maryland after inheriting a half interest in his father's estate at Malden, Maryland.

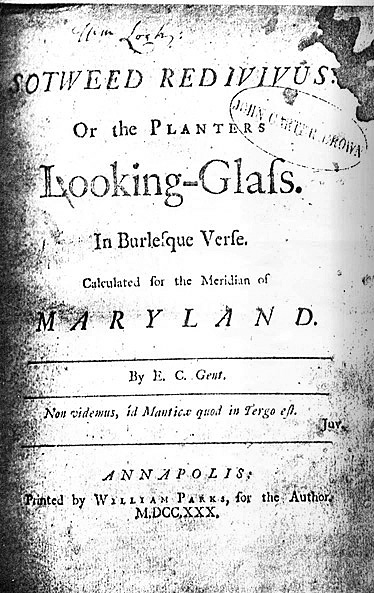
An earlier published copy of Ebineezer Cookes satirical poem "The Sot-weed factor", circa 1730. The poem was first released in 1708.

Almost all that is known about Cooke was discovered by Lawrence C. Wroth and published in the introduction to a facsimile edition of The Maryland Muse, (1934, originally published 1730). Building on the few historical references, Wroth theorized that Cooke's grandfather, Andrew Cooke, came to Maryland in 1661 and bought several pieces of property, including a place called "Malden", later called "Cooke's Point". Cooke's father, also named Andrew, married a woman named Anne in England in 1664. Wroth guesses Ebenezer was born the next year. Based on the poem, Ebenezer attended Cambridge University and came to Maryland in 1694. He returned to England before "The Sot–Weed Factor" was published in 1708 in London. He probably remained in England until after his father's will was probated in 1711–12 and returned to Maryland before 1717. A poem eulogizing the Hon. Nicholas Lowe was published in the Maryland Gazette in December 1728, signed by "E. C. Laureat", and a poem called "Sot-Weed Redivivus", signed by "E. C. Gent", was published in 1730 by William Parks in Annapolis. Cooke died sometime after 1732, the date of publication of the last work signed "Ebenezer Cooke".

"The Sot-Weed Factor" was reprinted in 1865 by Brantz Mayer, who called "the adventures and manners described ludicrous and certainly very unpolished". One of Cooke's admirers was Moses Coit Tyler, who praised "The Sot-Weed Factor" in his History of American Literature (1878), saying it struck "a vein of genuine and powerful satire"; Tyler cited a few dozen lines from the poem, and added that "Sot-Weed Redivivus" lacks the first poem's wit. Cooke's work, mostly forgotten, was brought out of obscurity by Bernard Christian Steiner, who in 1900 published Early Maryland poetry, a volume of Cooke's poetry which contained the two "Sot-Weed Factor" poems, the "Elegy Upon Nicholas Lowe, Esq.", and another early Maryland poem by an unknown author, "The Mousetrap".

== "The Sot-Weed Factor" ==
Written in Hudibrastic couplets, the poem is, on its surface, a scathing Juvenalian satire of America and its colonists, and a parody of the pamphlets that advertised colonization as easy and lucrative (38, 40). The persona comes to Maryland as a tobacco merchant, or "sot-weed factor". He is shocked by the brutishness of Native Americans and English settlers alike, and he is swindled by an "ambodexter quack", or corrupt lawyer. He leaves the colony in disgust.

== Other works ==
- "An ELOGY on the Death of Thomas Bordley Esquire", 1726
- "An Elegy on the Death of the Honorable Nicholas Lowe", Maryland Gazette, 1728. (Signed "E. Cooke. Laureat")
- "Sotweed Redivivus or the Planters Looking Glass", Annapolis, 1730 (signed E. C. Gent)
- The Maryland Muse, containing a revised version of The Sot–weed Factor and "The History of Colonel Nathaniel Bacon's Rebellion in Virginia", 1731 (signed E, Cooke, Gent")
- "An Elegy on the Death of the Honorable William Locke, Esquire" May, 1732 (Signed "Ebenezer Cook, Poet Laureat")
- "In Memory of the Honorable Benedict Leonard Calvert Esquire. Lieutenant Governor in the Province of Maryland" . . . U.S. Naval Academy, Annapolis, Maryland.

== Works cited ==
- Arner, Robert D. (1971). "Ebenezer Cooke's 'The Sot-Weed Factor': The Structure of Satire". Southern Literary Journal (Fall).
- Barret, Tammy (1998). "Ebenezer Cook(e)". Archived from the original on 2001-05-10.
- Carey, G. A. (1990). "The Poem as Con Game: Dual Satire and the Three Levels of Narrative in Ebenezer Cooke's 'The Sot-Weed Factor'". Southern Literary Journal.
- Diser, Philip E. (1968). "The Historical Ebenezer Cooke". Critique. 10 (3): 48–59.
- Ford, Sarah (2003). "Humor's Role in Imagining America: Ebenezer Cook's 'The Sot-Weed Factor'". Southern Literary Journal. 35 (2): 1–12. doi:10.1353/slj.2003.0020. S2CID 159860185.
- Lemay, J. A. Leo (1972). Men of Letters in Colonial Maryland. Knoxville: U of Tennessee P.
- Mayer, Brantz, ed. (1865). The Sot-Weed Factor, by Ebenezer Cooke. Shea's Early Southern Tracts. Vol. 2. Baltimore.
- Micklus, Robert (1984). "The Case Against Ebenezer Cooke's 'Sot-Weed Factor'". American Literature. 56 (2): 251–61. doi:10.2307/2925757. JSTOR 2925757.
- Steiner, Bernard C. (1900). Early Maryland Poetry: The Works of Ebenezer Cook, Gent. Fund Publications. Vol. 36. Baltimore: Maryland Historical Society.
- Tyler, Moses Coit (1883) [1878]. History of American Literature. New York: Putnam.
- Wroth, Lawrence C. (1934). "The Maryland Muse by Ebenezer Cooke" (PDF). Proceedings of the American Antiquarian Society. 44 (2): 267–335.
