= Frame-Tale =

""Frame-Tale""
- Short story by John Barth

Publication
- Publisher: Doubleday & Co.
- Publication date: 1968

"Frame-Tale" is a work of short fiction by John Barth published in Lost in the Funhouse (1968) by Doubleday & Co..

Lost in the Funhouse was nominated for the National Book Award (1968).

== Plot and analysis ==
"'Frame-Tale'...happens to be, I believe, the shortest short story in the English language (ten words); on the other hand, it's endless." —John Barth in his Preface to Lost in the Funhouse (1987).

Möbius strip

"Frame-Tale" serves as a three-dimensional representation of the stories that comprise the Funhouse collection as a whole. If the reader follows Barth's directions, a Möbius strip will be constructed from a portion of the page on which the story is printed in large font in capital letters. The story will read "ONCE UPON A TIME THERE WAS A STORY THAT BEGAN" endlessly.

Biographer and critic Edward Walkiewicz suggests that "Frame-Tale" represents a "recycling of elements from Barth's own fictions and of the oral-literary tradition" as well as Barth's fascination with the ancient tale of Scheherazade in A Thousand and One Nights.

Barth, in his retrospective Preface, comments on conceiving "Frame-Tale" and the Funhouse volume:

Though the several stories would be more or less stand alone (and therefore be anthologizable), the series would be strung together on a few echoed and developed themes and would circle back upon itself…emblematic of Viconian eternal return, but to make a circuit with a twist to it, like a Mobius strip, emblematic of—well, read the book.

If the "headpiece" of the collection is "Frame-Tale," the final story, "Anonymiad," is the "tailpiece" of the series, returning to Barth's literary "labyrinth."

== Sources ==
- Barth, John. 1968. Lost in the Funhouse: Fiction for Print, Tape, Live Voice. Doubleday & Co., Garden City, N. Y. ISBN 9780385041874 (Hardback, first edition)
- Barth, John. 1988. Lost in the Fun House. Anchor Books, New York. ISBN 0-385-24087-2 (Paperback).
- Barth, John. 1987. Preface to Lost in the Fun House. Anchor Books, New York. pp. v-viii. ISBN 0-385-24087-2 (Paperback).
- Kaufman, Michael T. and Garner, Dwight. 2024. John Barth, Writer Who Pushed Storytelling's Limits, Dies at 93. New York Times, April 2, 2024.https://www.nytimes.com/2024/04/02/books/john-barth-dead.html#:~:text=John%20Barth%2C%20who%2C%20believing%20that,of%20storytelling%20with%20imaginative%20and Accessed 20 December 2025.
- Walkiewicz, Edward P. 1986. John Barth. Twayne's United States Author Series, Warren French, editor. G. K. Hall & Co., Boston, Massachusetts. ISBN 0-8057-7461-0
