= The Sot-Weed Factor (poem) =

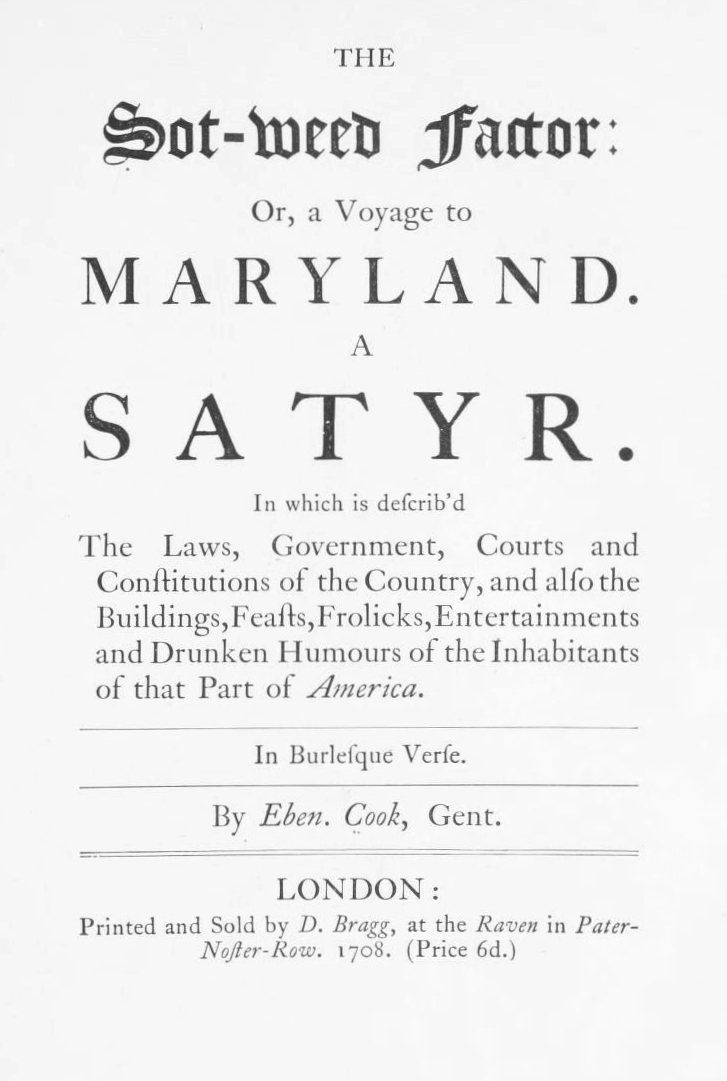

"The Sot-Weed Factor: Or, a Voyage to Maryland. A Satyr" is a satirical poem written by British-American poet Ebenezer Cooke, and first published in London in 1708.

== Content ==
Written in Hudibrastic couplets, the poem is, on its surface, a scathing Juvenalian satire of America and its colonists, and a parody of the pamphlets that advertised colonization as easy and lucrative (38, 40). The persona comes to Maryland as a tobacco merchant, or "sot-weed factor". He is shocked by the brutishness of Native Americans and English settlers alike, and he is swindled by an "ambodexter quack", or corrupt lawyer. He leaves the colony in disgust.

== Reception ==
Some critics, notably Robert D. Arner, J. A. Lemay, G. A. Carey, and Sarah Ford, read the poem as a dual satire, targeting the closed-minded, embittered, failed colonist as much as it satirizes the colony. This dual satire, Ford argues, helped to promote a national identity, as "the colonists become insiders who perceive the humor in the factor's inability to adapt to life in America". Robert Micklus, too, sees the poem's humor as contributing to an aspect of American culture—namely, a tendency towards self-referential satire, later further developed by Alexander Hamilton and Benjamin Franklin. What is significant about the poem, for Micklus, is not what Cooke says about either the colony or the English, but how Cooke goes about showing that his speaker "is a complete ass".

In 1970, Edward H. Cohen stated that, "[i]n all of colonial American literature there is no problem so perplexing as that of the textual history of The Sot-weed Factor.... [I]n 1731 [Cooke] published in Annapolis a tempered revision of the same poem ... identified, on its title page, as "The Third Edition." But what, then, has become of the second edition?" While Cohen points out that there are drafts of a preface for a second edition, this does not prove that such an edition was published. Joe Nickell has argued, based on similarities in the text and the published preface, that the second edition is actually the sequel, Sot-Weed Redivivus.

The poem inspired John Barth's 1960 novel, The Sot-Weed Factor.

== Works cited ==
- Arner, Robert D. (1971). "Ebenezer Cooke's 'The Sot-Weed Factor': The Structure of Satire". Southern Literary Journal (Fall).
- Barret, Tammy (1998). "Ebenezer Cook(e)". Archived from the original on 2001-05-10.
- Carey, G. A. (1990). "The Poem as Con Game: Dual Satire and the Three Levels of Narrative in Ebenezer Cooke's 'The Sot-Weed Factor'". Southern Literary Journal.
- Diser, Philip E. (1968). "The Historical Ebenezer Cooke". Critique. 10 (3): 48–59.
- Ford, Sarah (2003). "Humor's Role in Imagining America: Ebenezer Cook's 'The Sot-Weed Factor'". Southern Literary Journal. 35 (2): 1–12. doi:10.1353/slj.2003.0020. S2CID 159860185.
- Lemay, J. A. Leo (1972). Men of Letters in Colonial Maryland. Knoxville: U of Tennessee P.
- Mayer, Brantz, ed. (1865). The Sot-Weed Factor, by Ebenezer Cooke. Shea's Early Southern Tracts. Vol. 2. Baltimore.
- Micklus, Robert (1984). "The Case Against Ebenezer Cooke's 'Sot-Weed Factor'". American Literature. 56 (2): 251–61. doi:10.2307/2925757. JSTOR 2925757.
- Steiner, Bernard C. (1900). Early Maryland Poetry: The Works of Ebenezer Cook, Gent. Fund Publications. Vol. 36. Baltimore: Maryland Historical Society.
- Tyler, Moses Coit (1883) [1878]. History of American Literature. New York: Putnam.
- Wroth, Lawrence C. (1934). "The Maryland Muse by Ebenezer Cooke" (PDF). Proceedings of the American Antiquarian Society. 44 (2): 267–335.
