= Political criticism =

Type of criticism

Political criticism, also referred to as political commentary or political discussion, is a type of criticism that is specific of or relevant to politics, including policies, politicians, political parties and types of government.

In the Common law, there were two views: the "narrow view" of the majority of jurisdictions was that false statements of facts were not privileged, and the "liberal view" of the minority of jurisdictions, which allowed for subjective belief in the facts. Under modern United States law, the actual malice rule applies to political criticism, as enunciated in Times v. Sullivan.

== See also ==
- Bad Subjects
- Political communication
- Political satire
- Political spectrum
