= Once Upon a Time: A Floating Opera =

1994 novel by John Barth

First edition

Once Upon a Time: A Floating Opera is a novel by American writer John Barth, published in 1994. A character named John Barth and his female companion set sail on the Chesapeake Bay on the 500th anniversary of Columbus's discovery of America and are unexpectedly caught in a tropical storm. While trying to find his way out of the Maryland marshes, Barth comes across a "metaphysical zone" in which he encounters scenes and characters from his previous novels. The title references Barth's first novel, The Floating Opera (1956).
