= End of the Road (1970 film) =

1970 film by Aram Avakian

- Directed by: Aram Avakian
- Written by: Terry Southern; Aram Avakian; Dennis McGuire
- Based on: The End of the Road by John Barth
- Produced by: Stephen F. Kesten; Terry Southern
- Starring: Stacy Keach; Harris Yulin; Dorothy Tristan; James Earl Jones; Grayson Hall; Ray Brock
- Cinematography: Gordon Willis
- Edited by: Aram Avakian; Robert Q. Lovett
- Music by: Teo Macero
- Production company: Max L. Raab Productions
- Distributed by: Allied Artists
- Release date: February 10, 1970
- Running time: 110 minutes
- Country: United States
- Language: English

End of the Road is a 1970 American satirical black comedy drama film directed, co-written, and edited by Aram Avakian and adapted from a 1958 novel by John Barth, and stars Stacy Keach, James Earl Jones and Harris Yulin. The film follows Jacob Horner, a man who has a catatonic episode and is taken to "The Farm", an unconventional mental institution run by the eccentric Doctor D. After being cured, Jacob takes a job as an English lecturer and begins a disastrous affair with Rennie Morgan, the wife of his colleague Joe.

The film was given an X rating for a detailed abortion scene and a scene where a man has sex with a chicken. The film won the Golden Leopard at the Locarno International Film Festival. Despite a mixed critical reaction at the time of its release, the film acquired a cult following at art movie houses across the U.S. In 2012, it was released on DVD as part of the Warner Archive Collection. The revival was spearheaded by director Steven Soderbergh, who made the companion documentary, An Amazing Time: A Conversation About the End of the Road, for the DVD release.

== Plot ==
Jacob Horner, who has just received his graduate degree from Johns Hopkins University, walks straight from his graduation ceremony to a nearby railway platform. His walk is interspersed with images of the social upheaval of the 1960s, including the Kennedy assassinations, the civil rights movement, student protests, and the Vietnam War. At the train station, Jacob goes into a catatonic state, unresponsive to anyone who encounters him.

Doctor D, an unorthodox psychiatrist, finds him and is able to wake him from his stupor. He takes Jacob to the Institute of Psychic Remobilization, the bizarre insane asylum he runs, where he encourages patients to act out their fantasies as a form of therapy. These patients range from the cross-dressing Nurse Dockey, a couple that engages in public sex, a man who thinks he is a dog, and a man who has sex with a chicken.

At the Institute, also known as The Farm, Jacob undergoes treatment, which consists of physical punishment and audiovisual experiments. Before he is discharged, Doctor D tells him he must find a job as a member of society and avoid personal or political engagement. Because Jacob earned his master's degree in English literature, Doctor D recommends that he teach prescriptive English grammar at the local college.

Jacob finds lodging at an abandoned factory and has a brief fling with Peggy Rankin, a lonely older woman. On Jacob's first day on the job, he befriends fellow teacher Joe Morgan. Joe, who is also a Boy Scout leader, invites Jacob to dinner with his wife Rennie. Joe is revealed to be abusive towards Rennie. During the dinner, Joe appears to goad Jacob into having an affair with Rennie, and persuades Rennie to take the man horseback riding.

Rennie and Jacob return to the Morgan home after horse riding, and Jacob invites Rennie to join him in spying on Joe, who thinks he is alone. They observe Joe masturbating to William Shakespeare works and pointing a gun down his pants, upsetting Rennie. Rennie and Jacob thereafter begin an affair, which results in the former's pregnancy. Rennie confronts Jacob with news of her pregnancy with her husband by her side. She admits to telling Joe all the details of their affair, and expresses she does not want to leave Joe or keep the fetus, threatening suicide if forced to carry the pregnancy to term. Joe angrily tells Jacob that he must find an abortionist for Rennie.

Jacob tries to contact an abortionist he knows, but the practitioner is not able to see Rennie in time. Out of options, he turns to Doctor D. Jacob brings Rennie to The Farm, where she is strapped down to a bed. Doctor D proceeds with an unsafe abortion, inserting a curette and causing Rennie to convulse in pain. Though Doctor D rushes to sedate her, she vomits inside her anesthesia mask and chokes to death. A stunned Doctor D and Jacob stare at Rennie's lifeless body. Later, Jacob wraps up her body and at a lake with Doctor D, dumps it into the water. The film's end credits play alongside footage of the Apollo 11 moon landing and President Richard Nixon welcoming the astronauts back home.

== Cast ==
- Stacy Keach as Jacob Horner
- Harris Yulin as Joe Morgan
- Dorothy Tristan as Rennie Morgan
- James Earl Jones as Doctor D
- Grayson Hall as Peggy Rankin
- Ray Brock as Nurse Dockey/Sniper
- John Pleshette as Finkle
- Joel Oppenheimer as Chicken Man
- James Coco as School Man
- Oliver Clark as Dog Man
- M. Emmet Walsh as Crab Man/Tutu Man

== Production ==
Producer Max Raab had acquired the rights to John Barth's 1958 novel The End of the Road. Terry Southern became interested and brought in his friend Aram Avakian; Southern and Avakian made changes to the spec script already written by Dennis McGuire. Changes from the novel included updating the setting from the 1950s when the book was published, to the late 1960s, the removal of Jacob Horners' narration, and an expanded role for Doctor D. Southern added much of the film's psycho-visual, absurdist content, including the chicken sex scene.

The film was shot in Great Barrington, Massachusetts in the summer of 1968. The filmmakers were given complete creative control by producers. The production of the film was detailed in a nine-page Life magazine article that was published on November 7, 1969.

== Release ==
The film was given an X rating for the abortion scene and the chicken scene. It was released theatrically in New York City on February 10, 1970. Due to its rating, it was given a very limited theatrical run and distributor Allied Artists refused to promote it.

In the UK, the film was released without a certification from the BBFC.

Steven Soderbergh, a devotee of Terry Southern, revived the film, and on September 18, 2012, End of the Road was issued on DVD as part of the Warner Archive Collection. The DVD includes a Soderbergh documentary on the making of the film.

== Reception ==
At the time of its release, End of the Road received mixed reviews. Though the film received praise for its cinematography and technical aspects, particularly the opening sequence, critics lambasted its "absurdist point of view", calling it "too self-congratulatory a tone". In The Village Voice, Molly Haskell wrote "Avakian has not been able to capture the essence of [Barth's] novel". John Simon wrote "End of the Road is a pretentious, unappetizing disaster." Conversely, in a review that awarded the film 3 out of 4 stars, Roger Ebert of the Chicago Sun-Times wrote: "What's happening at the subterranean levels of End of the Road may be something you'll have to discover for yourself. For me, the strength and horror of the film came in its merging madness with the normal world...Avakian's insistence on keeping all these events on the same plane makes the movie gut twisting. And yet, there are many scenes of quiet humor and affection". In The Evening News, Bernard Drew lauded the film, its performances, and direction, writing, "There is brilliance in every of frame of film and daring in every turn of the camers [sic]".

Author John Barth disavowed the film, calling it "vulgar", and expressed particular distaste for the chicken scene.

=== Retrospective ===
In later years, the film received an appraisal. It has been described by critics as "a bleaker iteration of 1967's The Graduate". Film Comment wrote, "Even with 40 years to grow numb to the barrage of modish rhetoric about the collective American psyche unleashed in End of the Road, this unruly 1970 portrait of post-counterculture casualties and chaos remains an unsettling and uneven viewing experience." Soderbergh described the opening train platform sequence as "one of the best five-six minutes of cinema I've ever seen".

Noel Murray of The A.V. Club wrote "The actors find some truth in their performances, even amid all the shouting and goofing around, and the look of End of the Road—shot by the legendary Gordon Willis, in his first feature assignment, with Michael Chapman as his camera operator—is far more striking than the usual radical proto-indies of the era".

== See also ==
- List of American films of 1970
