= John Paisley =

John Paisley may refer to:

- John Paisley (CIA officer) (1923–1978)
- John Paisley (actor) (born 1938)
