= Sabbatical: A Romance =

1982 novel by John Barth

- First edition
- Author: John Barth
- Language: English
- Publisher: G. P. Putnam
- Publication date: 1982
- Publication place: United States
- Media type: Print
- Pages: 366
- ISBN: 0-399-12717-8

Sabbatical: A Romance is a novel by the American writer John Barth, published in 1982. The story is centered on a yacht race through the Chesapeake Bay. Barth's narrative was inspired by the death of ex-CIA officer John Paisley.

== Reception ==
In The Boston Phoenix, John Domini wrote that "like all good journeys, this novel’s full of surprises. Although subtitled A Romance, Sabbatical hinges on the unromantic maneuvers of our heartless CIA; though alive with the specifics of CIA tradecraft and of sailing up Chesapeake Bay, it also visits an uncharted island, shows us several terrifying dreams, and comes across a sea monster. And though Sabbatical ends up as a perpetual work-in-progress, in which the main characters continually polish their own act, it’s nonetheless suspenseful, as any spy novel and the smoothest reading from cover to cover Barth has managed since End of the Road.
