= EServer.org =

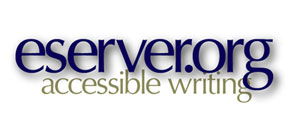
EServer.org logo

The EServer was an open access electronic publishing cooperative, founded in 1990, which published writings in the arts and humanities free of charge to Internet readers. In 2006, it was rated by Alexa as the most popular arts and humanities website in the world.

Martha L. Brogan and Daphnée Rentfrow wrote in 2005 that it had "more than 200 active members, including editors of an eclectic mix of 45 discrete 'collections' (Web sites), which 'publish' more than 32,000 works." Duke University Library rated the EServer among the "best overall directories for literary information on the Web."

== Scope of collection ==
The EServer published written works in the arts and humanities, largely (but not exclusively) those from the Western cultural tradition. In addition to literature such as poetry, novels, drama and short stories, the EServer published seven scholarly journals. Most releases were in English, but there were also significant numbers in many other languages. Whenever possible, EServer publications were released in open standards, such as XHTML.

== History ==
The EServer, 1996

The EServer was founded in 1990, when a group of graduate students set up their office computer in "Trailer H" on the Carnegie Mellon University campus network to permit them to collaborate with one another. In 1991, with the addition of more disk space, it became an Internet network server designed to provide public access (via FTP, telnet and Gopher to literary research, criticism, novels, and writings from various humanities disciplines.

The site, originally called the English Server, was dedicated to publishing works in the arts and humanities free of charge to Internet readers. It was developed to assist leisure reading in particular, following a study by Geoffrey Sauer (the site's director) into the rapid and significant increase of books in the United States post-1979 and a consequent decrease in leisure readings among young Americans. By 1992 it was an extremely popular Gopher and FTP site, and by 1993 had a significant World Wide Web presence.

Its original Internet domain name was "english-server.hss.cmu.edu", which later became "english-www.hss.cmu.edu", then "english.hss.cmu.edu", then "eng.hss.cmu.edu". In the years since, the name was shortened to "eserver.org", and it was usually referred to as "EServer."

The site is no longer published and available.

== Ideals ==
Contemporary publishing tend to place highest value on works that sell to broad markets. Quick turnover, high-visibility marketing campaigns for bestsellers, and corporate "superstore" bookstores have all made it less common for unique and older texts to be published. Geoffrey Sauer has argued that the costs this marketing adds to all books discourage people from leisure reading as a common practice. Publishers, he argues, then tend to encourage authors to write books with strong appeal to the current, undermining (if unknowingly) writings with longer-term implications.

== Criticism ==
The EServer was described in 2005 as linking to works of varied origin and quality. It was described in July 2006 as having some broken links and some out-of-date collections.

== Copyright issues ==
Copyright for the texts and collections published on the EServer were held by their authors, with rare exception for works commissioned by the EServer itself. Some of the texts were published under Creative Commons licenses, though many were distributed under an older model, which preserves the copyright in the author but permits reading and linking but not redistribution, except under specific limited conditions.

== See also ==
- Creative Commons
- Digital library
- e-texts
- Google Book Search
- Open access (publishing)
- Open Content Alliance
- Project Gutenberg
