= Monika Fludernik =

- Born: 1957 (age 68–69); Austria

Academic background
- Education: University of Graz (PhD)

Academic work
- Discipline: Literary theorist
- Sub-discipline: Narratology
- Institutions: University of Vienna; University of Freiburg

Monika Fludernik (born 1957), a native Austrian, is professor of English literature and culture at the University of Freiburg, Germany.

Fludernik earned her doctorate at the University of Graz, Austria, where she studied with professor Franz Karl Stanzel. In 1984, she took up an associate professorship at the University of Vienna, and since 1994 she has been a full professor at the University of Freiburg. Fludernik has held several temporary fellowships, at the Universities of Oxford, and Harvard, among other places, and she is a corresponding member of the Austrian Academy of Sciences. Since 2008 she is also a member of Academia Europaea.

Fludernik is renowned for her contribution to several fields of literary theory, particularly that of narratology, but also to postcolonial literary criticism, eighteenth-century aesthetics, and law and literature studies. She has also published on metaphor and, more recently, on otium (leisure) as part of the collaborative research centre on otium funded by the German Research Foundation.

In 2023, she was elected to the American Philosophical Society.

== Works ==
Besides being sole author of six books (see below), Fludernik has published more than 100 scientific articles and has edited and co-edited several volumes of books/special issues of scientific journals.

=== Books ===
- Fludernik, Monika (2019). Metaphors of confinement: the prison in fact, fiction, and fantasy. Law and literature. Oxford; New York, NY: Oxford University Press. ISBN 978-0-19-884090-9.
- Fludernik, Monika (2009). An introduction to narratology. London; New York: Routledge. ISBN 978-0-415-45029-4.
- Fludernik, Monika (2006). Einführung in die Erzähltheorie. Einführung Literaturwissenschaft. Darmstadt: Wiss. Buchges. ISBN 978-3-534-16330-4.
- Fludernik, Monika (2000). Echoes and mirrorings: Gabriel Josipovici's creative œuvre. Frankfurt am Main; New York: Peter Lang. ISBN 978-0-8204-4748-3.
- Fludernik, Monika (2002). Towards a 'natural' narratology. London New York: Routledge. ISBN 978-0-203-43250-1.
- Fludernik, Monika (1993). The fictions of language and the languages of fiction: the linguistic representation of speech and consciousness. London New York: Routledge. ISBN 978-0-203-45100-7.

=== Edited books ===
- Ed., together with Marie-Laure Ryan. Narrative Factuality: A Handbook. Revisionen. Berlin: de Gruyter, 2019.
- Ed., together with Jan Alber. Postclassical Narratology: Approaches and Analyses. Columbus, OH: Ohio State Univ. Press, 2016. Paperpack edition.
- Ed., together with Miriam Nandi. Idleness, Indolence and Leisure in British Literature. Basingstoke: Palgrave, 2014.
- Ed. Beyond Cognitive Metaphor Theory: Perspectives on Literary Metaphor. Routledge Studies in Rhetoric and Stylistics, 3. London: Routledge, 2011.
- Ed., together with Greta Olson. In the Grip of the Law: Prisons, Trials and the Space Between. Frankfurt/New York: Lang, 2004.
- Ed. Diaspora and Multiculturalism: Common Traditions and New Developments. Readings in the Post/Colonial Literatures in English, 66. Amsterdam: Rodopi, 2003.
- Ed. Hybridity and Postcolonialism: Twentieth-Century Indian Literature. Tübingen: Stauffenburg, 1998.
