= The Floating Opera =

Novel by John Barth

- First edition
- Author: John Barth
- Language: English
- Publication date: 1956; 1967 (revised)
- Publication place: United States
- Pages: 272

The Floating Opera is a novel by American writer John Barth, first published in 1956 and significantly revised in 1967. Barth's first published work, the existentialist and nihilist story is a first-person account of a day when protagonist Todd Andrews contemplates suicide.

Critics and Barth himself often pair The Floating Opera with Barth's next novel, The End of the Road (1958); both were written in 1955, and they are available together in a one-volume edition. Both are philosophical novels; The End of the Road continues with the conclusions made about absolute values by the protagonist of The Floating Opera, and takes these ideas "to the end of the road". Barth wrote both novels in a realistic mode, in contrast to Barth's better-known metafictional, fabulist, and postmodern works from the 1960s and later, such as Lost in the Funhouse (1968) and LETTERS (1979).

== Publication history ==
While teaching at Penn State, Barth embarked on a cycle of 100 stories he called Dorchester Tales; he abandoned it halfway through to begin his first two published novels. He completed both The Floating Opera and The End of the Road in 1955. After a string of publisher rejections, Appleton-Century-Crofts agreed to publish The Floating Opera in 1956, but stipulated it "conclude on a less 'nihilist' note"; Barth complied and altered the ending. Sales were not strong enough to encourage the publisher to pick up Barth's next offering, which was felt to be too similar to the first book. The End of the Road was published by Doubleday in 1958; it received only marginally more attention than The Floating Opera. Barth made a number of changes to the text for a revised edition from Anchor Books in 1967, including restoration of the original ending. Anchor collected Barth's first two novels in a single-volume edition in 1988.

== Background ==
“The first novel I wrote, The Floating Opera, began with a photograph of an old showboat which used to go around the tidewater Maryland area. I remember seeing that boat when I was about seven. When I came across a photograph of that old show boat in 1954, I thought it would be a good idea to write a philosophical minstrel show. I wasn't going to write a novel at all; I was going to write a minstrel show, only it was going to be a work of literature. I started to do it and it ended up being a novel instead.”—John Barth, interviewed by critic John J. Enck (1965)

The Floating Opera can be viewed with The End of the Road (1958) as forming the early, existentialist or nihilist phase of Barth's writing career. This phase was realistic in a modernist sense; it lacked the fantastic elements that manifested themselves in Barth's experimental phase that began with The Sot-Weed Factor (1960). Both novels, while displaying a distinctive style, followed conventions readers expected from a novel, and were part of the realist trend in novels prevalent in the United States during the 1940s and 1950s. As The Floating Opera closes, its protagonist, Todd Andrews, concludes that life has no absolute values but that there are relative values that are "no less 'real,' for ... being relative". Barth has said he wrote The End of the Road to refute this worldview by carrying "all non-mystical value-thinking to the end of the road", and that the second novel was a "nihilistic tragedy" paired with the "nihilistic comedy" of the first. Barth also sees the book as the second of a "loose trilogy of novels" that concludes with The Sot-Weed Factor, after which he embarked on the fabulist Giles Goat-Boy (1966).

== Reception and legacy ==
Upon its initial publication, The Floating Opera received mixed critical responses. Writing for The New York Times, Orville Prescott described the novel as “odd” and found it dull and labored, arguing that its philosophical seriousness conflicted with its farcical elements. While he acknowledged moments of humor, Prescott questioned the plausibility of the protagonist’s suicidal contemplation, suggesting that Todd Andrews’s evident enjoyment of life undermined the novel’s existential premise.

Subsequent discussion of The Floating Opera has often been shaped by John Barth’s later literary career. Because the novel and its companion work, The End of the Road, precede Barth’s more experimental and metafictional fiction of the 1960s and beyond, critics have frequently treated them as early or transitional works. As a result, the novels are sometimes overlooked in favor of later works such as Lost in the Funhouse and LETTERS, which more clearly established Barth’s postmodern reputation.

At the same time, The Floating Opera has been retrospectively situated as an important document of Barth’s early engagement with existential and nihilist thought, written in a realist mode characteristic of mid-twentieth-century American fiction. In this context, the novel is often read alongside The End of the Road as part of a formative phase in Barth’s development, providing a philosophical foundation for the more formally innovative fiction that followed.
