= Lewis Henry Steiner =

American physician and politician (1827–1892)

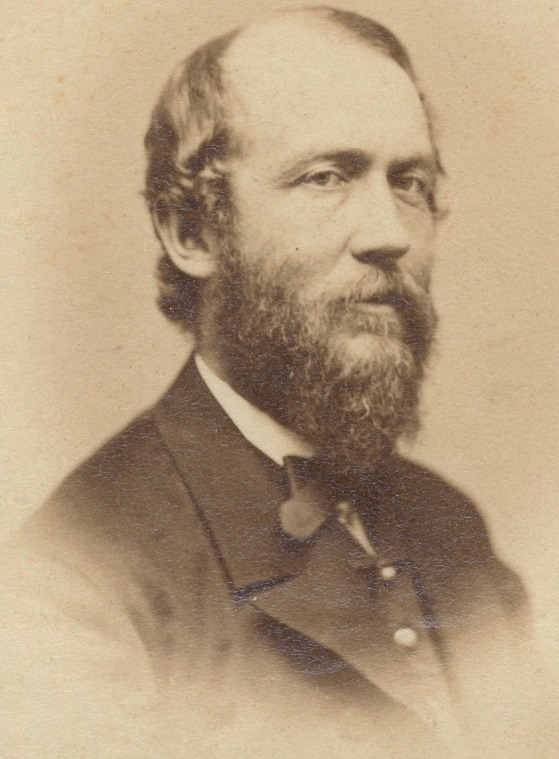
- Portrait of Steiner
- Born: May 4, 1827
- Died: February 18, 1892 (aged 64)
- Occupation: Observer

Lewis Henry Steiner (May 4, 1827 – February 18, 1892) was an American medical doctor and librarian. He was a member of the Maryland Senate from 1872 to 1884.

== Biography ==
Lewis Henry Steiner was born in Frederick, Maryland.

He was educated at Marshall College, Pennsylvania, where he received the degree of A.M. in 1849, and was graduated the same year at the medical department of the University of Pennsylvania. He began to practise in Frederick, but in 1852 moved to Baltimore, where for three years he was associated with John R. W. Dunbar in the conduct of the Baltimore Medical Institute, at the end of which time he returned to Frederick.

Soon after he began to practise his attention was especially directed to chemistry and the allied sciences, and during his residence in Baltimore his time was largely occupied in teaching. He was professor of chemistry and natural history in Columbian College, Washington, D.C., and also of chemistry and pharmacy in the National Medical College, Washington, in 1853; lecturer on chemistry and physics in St. James College, Maryland, in 1854; lecturer on applied chemistry in the Maryland Institute in 1855, and professor of chemistry in the Maryland College of Pharmacy in 1856. By 1855, he had given up the practice of medicine to devote his career to the natural sciences, botany and chemistry in particular.

During the Civil War, he was actively employed as an inspector by the United States Sanitary Commission, and for a period was in charge of its operations in the Army of the Potomac as chief inspector. He published a brief history of the Commission in 1866.

He became president of the Frederick County School Board in 1865 where a major interest was in developing school facilities for African-American children. In 1871 he was elected by the Republicans to the Maryland Senate, representing Frederick County for four years. He was re-elected for a like term in 1875, and again in 1879. He served until 1884. From 1855 until 1858, he was a contributor to, and afterward assistant editor of, The American Medical Monthly. His efforts were chiefly responsible for the Maryland General Assembly adopting the 1876 Great Seal of Maryland, which remains the State's Seal to this day.

In 1884 he was appointed librarian of the Enoch Pratt Free Library, remaining there until his death. He was a Reformed Church elder.

A collection of his papers is held at the National Library of Medicine in Bethesda, Maryland.

== Family ==
In 1866, he married Sarah Spencer Smyth. They had six children, of which one, his son Bernard Christian Steiner, succeeded his father as librarian.

== Works ==
- edition of Heinrich Will, Outlines of Chemical Analysis, translated from the 3rd German edition, with Daniel Brud (Cambridge, Massachusetts, 1855)
- Cantate Domino: a Collection of Chants, Hymns, etc., for Church Service, with Henry Schwing (Boston, 1859)
- Report containing a Diary kept during the Rebel Occupation of Frederick, Md., etc. (New York, 1862)

He published other translations from the German, with monographs, reports, lectures, and speeches.
