= John Paisley (CIA officer) =

CIA operative (1923–1978)

John Arthur Paisley (August 25, 1923 – September 24, 1978) was a former official of the Central Intelligence Agency.

== Early life ==
When Paisley was two years old, his father left the family. He was raised by his grandparents when his mother went to work as a practical nurse.

== Career ==
Paisley served in the CIA from 1963 to 1974. During his career, he was heavily involved in Soviet operations.

On January 7, 1979, The New York Times' investigative report ("The Missing CIA Man", by Tad Szulc), revealed that "Paisley was called in when the C.I.A. began the lengthy and laborious process of debriefing [Yuri] Nosenko, a member of the K.G.B.'s Second Chief Directorate, responsible for counterintelligence within the Soviet Union, who had defected to the United States early in 1964. Nosenko was the most important K.G.B. officer ever to defect. Ostensibly, Nosenko's greatest value to United States intelligence was to provide information on Soviet counterintelligence agents operating at home and abroad. This may have included data on counterintelligence in the strategic field - part of Paisley's expertise - and Paisley became enmeshed in the most controversial C.I.A. secret intelligence project of the decade".

Paisley retired as deputy director in the Office of Strategic Research, (Note: Another report noted his position as "director of strategic research".) the branch that monitored Soviet military movements and nuclear capabilities.

== Later life and presumed death ==
Around 1976, Paisley and Maryann separated. In December 1977 and March 1978, he attended two five-day "personal awareness" seminars conducted by Lifespring. According to Paisley's psychiatrist, Paisley began attending individual and group psychotherapy sessions in April.

On September 24, 1978, Paisley disappeared after setting sail on the Chesapeake Bay with his sloop Brillig. On October 1, a body claimed to be his was found floating in the Bay near the mouth of the Patuxent River with a gunshot wound to his head and a weighted dive belt around his waist. His boat was found the previous week run aground. However, the autopsy report later revealed discrepancies with his documented height and weight, leading to long-held suspicions that the badly-decomposed body, as was found, was not actually Paisley's. [See 'Senate inquiry' below]. Due to the advanced state of decomposition of the body when it was found, fingerprinting was not possible, and other means of positive identifications were similarly impossible to be ascertained. The CIA arranged for the body to be cremated, without family, friends and/or associates having had an opportunity to positively identify the remains as Paisley's.

Shortly after his presumed death, the psychiatrist stated Paisley was to attend a group therapy session in Chevy Chase, Maryland on September 26 with his estranged wife to discuss the failure of their marriage. He speculated that due to personal developments Paisley may have been experiencing "feelings of loss and abandonment".

== Senate inquiry ==
Due to the circumstances of Paisley's death and press speculation, the United States Senate Select Committee on Intelligence (SSCI) opened an inquiry in order to determine if his death was due to his activities with the CIA. After a two year investigation and three public statements, the SSCI reported that it "found no information to support the allegations that Mr. Paisley's death was connected in some way to involvement in foreign intelligence or counterintelligence matters."

In 1989, Crown Publishers put out Widows, a book by William R. Corson, Susan B. Trento, and Joseph J. Trento that stated the CIA failed to properly investigate the deaths of Paisley and two other CIA officials, Nicholas Shadrin and Ralph Sigler. The authors state that the body discovered in the Chesapeake Bay was not Paisley's.

In 2022, Harper published "The Spy who Knew Too Much", by Howard Blum, in which the author maintains that Paisley, working as a double agent, and at his request, was exfiltrated by the USSR and his death in the US was staged, presumably by the KGB Counterintelligence.

== See also ==
- John Barth's 1982 Sabbatical: A Romance
