= Joseph Natoli =

American academic (born 1943)

- Born: 1943 (age 81–82); Brooklyn, New York
- Occupation: writer, professor, librarian
- Literary movement: Blakean, film criticism, postmodernism, politics.

Website
- josephnatoli.com

Joseph Phillip Natoli (born 1943) is an American academic. He has written on postmodernism, and from 1991 until 2009 was editor of the Postmodern Culture series published by the State University of New York Press. He is a member of the Truthout Public Intellectual Project, founded by Henry Giroux, and is on the editorial team of Bad Subjects.

== Publications ==
Natoli has written several books, and since 2010 has published in online journals.

- Twentieth Century Blake Criticism; Garland, Routledge, (1982, 2017).
- Psychocriticism: An Annotated Bibliography; Greenwood Press, (1984).
- Psychological Perspectives on Literature: Freudian Dissidents and Non-Freudians: a Casebook; editor, Archon, (1984).
- Tracing Literary Theory; University of Illinois Press, (1987).
- Literary Theory's Future(s); editor, University of Illinois Press, (1989).
- Mots d'ordre; SUNY, (1992).
- A Postmodern Reader; ed. with Linda Hutcheon, SUNY, (1993). Trans. into Chinese.
- A Primer To Postmodernity; Blackwell, (1997). Trans. into Chinese and Turkish
- Postmodernism: The Key Figures; ed. with Hans Bertens, Blackwell, (2002). Trans. into Japanese and Czech
- Occupying Here & Now; Nordgaard Press (2012).
- Travels Of A New Gulliver; (2013).
- Dark Affinities, Dark Imaginaries: A Mind's Odyssey; SUNY, (2017).

=== Film and American Culture Series ===
- Hauntings: Popular Film and American Culture 1990–1992; SUNY, (1994).
- Speeding to the Millennium: Film and Culture 1993–1995; SUNY, (1998).
- Postmodern Journeys: Film and Culture 1996–1998; SUNY, (2001).
- Memory's Orbit: Film and Culture 1999–2000; SUNY, (2003).
- This Is a Picture and Not the World: Movies and a Post-9/11 America; SUNY, (2007).
