= Fabulation =

Genre of primarily 20th-century novelistic fiction similar in style to magic realism

Fabulation is a style or genre of fiction that is influenced by magic realism, but does not fit into the traditional categories of realism or (novelistic) romance. Fabulating authors include Thomas Pynchon, John Barth, Donald Barthelme, William H. Gass, Robert Coover, and Ishmael Reed. The term was popularized by Robert Scholes, in his work The Fabulators (1967). As M. H. Abrams wrote,

[Such novels] violate, in various ways, standard novelistic expectations by drastic—and sometimes highly effective—experiments with subject matter, form, style, temporal sequence, and fusions of the everyday, the fantastic, the mythical, and the nightmarish, in renderings that blur traditional distinctions between what is serious or trivial, horrible or ludicrous, tragic or comic.

== See also ==
- Historiographic metafiction
- Metahistorical romance
