= Bernard Christian Steiner =

American lawyer

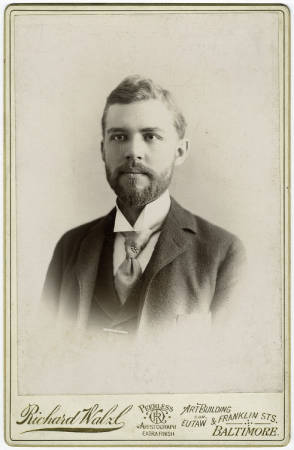
- Born: August 13, 1867
- Died: January 12, 1926 (aged 58)
- Occupation: Librarian

Bernard Christian Steiner (August 13, 1867 in Guilford, Connecticut – January 12, 1926) was a United States educator, librarian and jurist.

== Biography ==
He prepared for college at the academy of Frederick, Maryland, then attended Yale, where he graduated with an A.B. in 1888, and an A.M. in 1890. He was a Fellow in history at Johns Hopkins, 1890–91 and received a PhD there in 1891. From 1891 to 1892, he was an instructor in history at Williams College. In 1893, he was instructor of history at Johns Hopkins, and associate there from 1894 to 1911. He graduated from the University of Maryland with degree of LL.B. in 1894.

In 1892, he became librarian of the Enoch Pratt Free Library of Baltimore, succeeding his father, Lewis Henry Steiner, its first librarian. He occupied this position for the rest of his life, and to it he devoted his primary attention, his motto being "The Library is the continuation school of the people", which motto however did not always ring true with his patrons, and was the source of some friction. He vigorously spread the influence of the library, increasing the number of branch libraries from six to twenty-five during his years of service.

He was dean and professor of constitutional law at the short-lived Baltimore University from 1897 to 1900, and was dean and professor of public law at Baltimore Law School from 1900 to 1904.

== Personal ==
He was a Presbyterian. He and his spouse, Ethel Simes Mulligan Steiner, had a son.

== Works ==
- History of Slavery in Connecticut (1893)
- Education in Connecticut (1893)
- Education in Maryland (1894)
- Citizenship and Suffrage in Maryland (1895)
- Institutions and Civil Government of Maryland (1899)
- Life of James McHenry (1907)
- Life of Reverdy Johnson (1914)
