= The Literature of Exhaustion =

1967 essay by John Barth

"The Literature of Exhaustion" is a 1967 essay by the American novelist John Barth sometimes considered to be the manifesto of postmodernism.

The essay was highly influential and controversial.

== Summary ==
The essay depicted literary realism as a "used up" tradition; Barth's description of his own work, which many thought nailed a core trait of postmodernism, is "novels which imitate the form of a novel, by an author who imitates the role of Author". He also stated that the novel as a literary form was coming to an end.

Barth argued that a particular stage in history was passing, and pointed to possible directions from there.

== Criticism ==
Gore Vidal criticized "The Literature of Exhaustion" and Barth's novels for making an analysis of only the plots of novels and myths, while refusing to engage with the style of either, resulting in reductionist and disinterested understandings of novels' contents. Vidal instead advocated increased stylistic innovation and appreciation as better venues for further progression of the novel as a form, pointing particularly to the work of Italo Calvino as a model.

== Sequel ==
In 1980, Barth wrote a follow-up essay, "The Literature of Replenishment" in order to clarify the earlier essay. "The Literature of Exhaustion" was about the need for a new era in literature after modernism had exhausted itself.

== See also ==
- Death of the novel
- Borges' "Pierre Menard, Author of the Quixote"
- Mock-heroic
- Postmodern literature
- List of postmodern critics
