= Senator Stein =

Senator Stein may refer to:

- Josh Stein (born 1966), North Carolina State Senate
- Kathy Stein (born 1955), Kentucky State Senate

== See also ==
- Senator Steiner (disambiguation)
- Senator Stine (disambiguation)
