= Aram Avakian =

American film editor and director

- Born: April 23, 1926; Manhattan, New York City
- Died: January 17, 1987 (aged 60); New York City
- Education: Horace Mann School Yale University
- Occupations: Film editor and director
- Partner(s): Dorothy Tristan (1957-1972); Allegra Kent
- Children: 2
- Relatives: George Avakian (brother)

Aram A. Avakian (April 23, 1926 – January 17, 1987) was an American film editor and director. His work in the latter role includes Jazz on a Summer's Day (1959) and the indie film End of the Road (1970).

== Life and work ==
Aram "Al" Avakian was born in Manhattan, New York, in 1926 to Armenian parents from Iran and Soviet Georgia. He graduated Horace Mann School and Yale University before serving as a Naval officer on an aircraft carrier in the Pacific. On the G.I. Bill after the war, he went to France where he attended the Sorbonne. There he was part of a tight group of young friends who defined the American literary movement of 1950s Paris, including Terry Southern, William Styron, John P. Marquand, and George Plimpton. In 1953, Avakian returned to the United States and apprenticed under famed photographer Gjon Mili who got him started in documentary editing. In his spare time, Avakian took still photographs of the legendary jazz sessions his brother the jazz producer George Avakian recorded.

From 1955 to 1958, Avakian was the editor of Edward R. Murrow's program See It Now. In his book Vanity of Duluoz, Jack Kerouac based the character of Charlie on Avakian. Avakian introduced Kerouac to jazz music at Horace Mann, where they both edited the school newspaper.

He soon became a feature film editor and director. In 1958, he directed a filmed record of the Newport Jazz Festival. The result, Jazz on a Summer's Day (1959), which Avakian also edited, is credited with being "the first feature-film documentary of a music festival." The music was supervised by Avakian's brother, George Avakian, the legendary jazz producer.

He edited the feature film Girl of the Night (1960), "acknowledged for its early use of the freeze frame and the jump cut" in American films. His credits as an editor also included Robert Frank's O.K. End Here (1960), Arthur Penn's The Miracle Worker (1962), Robert Rossen's Lilith (1964), Penn's Mickey One (1965), in which Avakian also plays the disembodied voice of Warren Beatty's tormentor, Francis Ford Coppola's You're a Big Boy Now (1966) and Jerry Schatzberg's Honeysuckle Rose (1979).

Avakian directed and edited the film End of the Road (1970), which received an "X" rating for its graphic depiction of an abortion. For End of the Road, Avakian received the Golden Leopard Award at the Locarno International Film Festival. Life magazine's November 7, 1969, issue covered the film in a spectacular 9-page article, and in-depth interviews ran in Esquire and Playboy. In a review of the film in The New York Times, Roger Greenspun wrote of End of the Road: "The precise truth of, say, 5 in a summer afternoon on the lawn of an assistant professor in a small country college has perhaps never been caught in a commercial movie before -- but that is the kind of precise truth this movie captures again and again." The film stars James Earl Jones, Stacy Keach, Dorothy Tristan, and Harris Yulin. In the film Avakian plays The Landlord, The Pigman, and the voice of the psychiatrist on the phone. George Avakian oversaw the music. Avakian's old friend, the novelist Terry Southern, co-produced the film, and co-wrote the screenplay with Avakian and Dennis McGuire.

End of the Road is an early indie picture which bucked Hollywood conventions and was before its time. Many of the cast and crew went on to distinguished film careers. The film is admired by filmmaker Steven Soderbergh, who directed an accompanying documentary on the making of the film on the Warner Bros. DVD, titled "An Amazing Time: Conversations About End of the Road", released on Sept. 18, 2012, as part of a series of great rediscovered movies. Cineaste published this 1980s interview in advance of the 2012 DVD release:

Avakian also directed and edited Cops and Robbers (1973), One Night Stands and 11 Harrowhouse (1974). and a lost film made in Paris, in French, in the early 1970s.

From 1983 through 1986, Avakian was chairman of the film department at State University of New York at Purchase. Arthur Penn spoke at Avakian's 1987 memorial. Francis Ford Coppola and Terry Southern wrote letters about Avakian, which were read aloud, and Gerry Mulligan played his saxophone, as well as others. It was a packed house at the New York City Armenian cathedral.

For fifteen years, Avakian was married to actress and writer Dorothy Tristan until 1972. During the last two years of his life, his companion was former ballerina Allegra Kent. His children with Tristan are photojournalist/author Alexandra Avakian and guitarist Tristan Avakian.

== Selected filmography ==
=== As editor (partial list) ===
- Jazz on a Summer's Day (1959)
- Girl of the Night (1960)
- The Miracle Worker (1962)
- Lilith (1964)
- Mickey One (1965)
- You're a Big Boy Now (1966)
- The Comedians (1967)
- The Next Man (1976)
- Honeysuckle Rose (1980)

=== As director (partial list) ===
- Jazz on a Summer's Day (with Bert Stern as co-director) (1959)
- Lad, A Dog (with Leslie H. Martinson) (1962)
- One Night Stands (1967) (Documentary)
- End of the Road (1970)
- Cops and Robbers (1973)
- 11 Harrowhouse (1974)
