= The Sot-Weed Factor (novel) =

1960 historical novel by John Barth

- First edition
- Author: John Barth
- Publisher: Doubleday
- Publication date: 1960

The Sot-Weed Factor is a 1960 novel by the American writer John Barth. The novel marks the beginning of Barth's literary postmodernism. The Sot-Weed Factor takes its title from the poem The Sot-Weed Factor: Or, a Voyage to Maryland. A Satyr (1708) by the English-born poet Ebenezer Cooke (c. 1665 – c. 1732), about whom few biographical details are known. The novel is considered one of the best works of postmodern fiction by critics and was featured among Time’s 100 greatest novels since 1923.

A satirical epic set in the 1680s–90s in London and colonial Maryland, the novel tells of a fictionalized Ebenezer Cooke, who is given the title "Poet Laureate of Maryland" by Charles Calvert, 3rd Baron Baltimore and commissioned to write a Marylandiad to sing the praises of the colony. He undergoes adventures on his journey to and within Maryland while striving to preserve his virginity. The complicated Tom Jones–like plot is interwoven with numerous digressions and stories-within-stories, and is written in a style patterned on the writing of 18th-century novelists such as Henry Fielding, Laurence Sterne, and Tobias Smollett.

== Plot ==
The novel is a satirical epic of the colonization of Maryland based on the life of Ebenezer Cooke, who wrote a poem of the same title. It tells the story of an English poet named Ebenezer Cooke who is given the title "Poet Laureate of Maryland" by Charles Calvert. He undergoes many adventures on his journey to Maryland and while in Maryland, all the while striving to preserve his innocence (i.e. his virginity). The book takes its title from the grand poem that Cooke composes throughout the story, which was originally intended to sing the praises of Maryland, but ends up being a biting satire based on his disillusioning experiences.

Ebenezer Cooke is the son of Andrew Cooke, an English merchant who owns a "sot-weed" (Colonial American slang for tobacco) plantation at the settlement of Malden in the colony of Maryland. Along with his twin sister Anna, Ebenezer is tutored privately by a young man named Henry Burlingame III. Later, while Ebenezer is studying at Cambridge University, he is reunited with Henry, who reveals his past life as an orphan, travelling musician and seaman. Henry recounts a tale of saving a mother and daughter from pirates, and then persuades Ebenezer to travel to London, where Ebenezer decides that his true vocation is to be a poet. While ill, Andrew Cooke grants power of attorney to Ebenezer and reveals that, after the death of their mother, Ebenezer and Anna were nursed by a woman named Roxanne Edouarde.

In London, Ebenezer declares his love for the prostitute Joan Toast, but refuses to pay her fee, and confesses to being a virgin. Joan's pimp and lover, John McEvoy, subsequently informs Andrew that Ebenezer has been leading a dissolute life, so Andrew sends Ebenezer and a servant, Bertrand Burton, to Maryland. From devotion to Joan, Ebenezer swears to remain a virgin. Before his departure, Ebenezer visits Charles Calvert, Lord Baltimore, who is the Governor of Maryland, and offers his services as a Poet Laureate of the colony. Calvert is bemused, but grants the commission. Ebenezer decides to write an epic poem entitled "Marylandiad".

On the coach to Plymouth, Ebenezer encounters Peter Sayer, who is really Henry in disguise. Henry reveals that, while trying to ascertain his true identity, he has become embroiled in the politics of Maryland, but has discovered that he was adopted as an infant by Captain Salmon, after being found floating on a raft in Chesapeake Bay. He has obtained part of a journal which reveals that his grandfather, Henry Burlingame I, took part in an expedition led by Captain John Smith that was attacked by Indians. In order to save his own life, and that of Burlingame, Smith undergoes a sexual trial with Pocahontas, the daughter of the Indian chief Powhatans. At this point, the journal breaks off, and Henry explains that he is searching for the remaining sections of the document.

In Plymouth, Henry leaves Ebenezer, who is terrified by a sinister pair of seamen called Slye and Scurry who declare that they are pursuing a man by the name of Ebenezer Cooke. Ebenezer boards his ship, the Poseidon, only to find that his identity has been assumed by Bertrand, who is fleeing London because of an affair with a married woman. In order to escape detection, Ebenezer agrees to exchange places with Bertrand on the voyage. Bertrand then loses Ebenezer's savings by gambling with the Reverend Tubman and a young woman named Lucy Robotham. The Poseidon is captured by pirates led by Captain Pound, and Ebenezer and Bertrand are taken on board their ship, which then attacks another ship, the Cyprian, which is loaded with prostitutes. The pirates rape the female passengers, and Ebenezer is tempted to rape a woman who reminds him of Joan. Captain Pound has Ebenezer and Bertrand thrown overboard, telling them that he has heard that someone by the name of Ebenezer Cooke has already arrived in Maryland.

Expecting to drown, Bertrand tells Ebenezer that he has wagered away to Tubman the whole of the Malden estate. The pair make it to shore where they free a bound black man named Drepacca, and treat the wounds of an elderly Indian chief named Quassapelagh. They meet Susan Warren, a female swineherd who also reminds Ebenezer of Joan. Susan claims that she has been debased by Captain William Mitchell, and that she is acquainted with Joan. Ebenezer meets both Captain Mitchell and his son Tim, who turns out to be Henry Burlingame III in another disguise. Ebenezer and Henry visit Father Smith, a Jesuit priest who owns part of the journal sought by Henry. Smith relates how he was told by an Indian named Charley Mattasin the tale of Father Fitzmaurice, a missionary who fathered three children on Indian women of the same tribe. The journal gives further details of the capture of Captain Smith and Henry's grandfather, but in order to discover more, Henry turns next to locating a cooper by the name of William Smith.

At the next settlement, Ebenezer witnesses a chaotic outdoor court in session. He hears how William Smith was once indentured to a man named Ben Spurdance and how Spurdance tried to swindle Smith out of his share of land upon expiry of his indenture. The court is about to find in favour of Spurdance, but an outraged Ebenezer insists that the court punish Spurdance by signing the rights to Spurdance's land over to Smith. The judge agrees and gets Ebenezer to sign a document, whereupon Ebenezer discovers that Spurdance is the overseer of Malden, and that his father's estate has now passed to Smith. Ebenezer meets Mary Mungummory, a prostitute who was once the lover of the Indian Charley Mattasin. He hears that John McEvoy has travelled to Maryland in search of Joan Toast, and meets Thomas Tayhoe, a man who has been indentured to William Smith because of trickery on the part of McEvoy. Ebenezer offers to exchange places with Tayhoe, and this plan is accepted by Smith on the condition that Ebenezer marries Susan Warren. After the marriage, Susan reveals that she is really Joan Toast.

Hearing that his father is due to arrive at Malden, Ebenezer flees in the company of Nicholas Lowe, who turns out to be Henry in yet another disguise. Henry reveals that Anna is in Maryland and Ebenezer resolves to find her. Arriving in the town of St Mary's, Ebenezer encounters Bertrand, who has again been posing as Ebenezer. Bertrand has become the lover of Lucy Robotham, who had married the Reverend Tubman only to discover that Tubman was already married. Because of the wagers made on board of the Poseidon, Tubman and Lucy both believe they have a claim on Malden.

After deciding to return to Malden, Ebenezer and Bertrand commission a boat skippered by Captain Cairn. During a storm, they shelter upon Bloodsworth Island, where they are captured by a community of rogue slaves and rebellious Indians that is dedicated to waging war against white men. Another prisoner is John McEvoy. They meet Drepacca and Quassapelagh, but are threatened with execution by Chicamec, king of the Ahatchwoop people. Ebenezer mentions the name of Henry Burlingame, whereupon Chicamec suspends their execution. Ebenezer is allowed to read a journal that gives a further account of the adventures of John Smith and Henry Burlingame I. The journal relates how Burlingame became chief of the Ahatchwoops by winning an eating contest. Furthermore, Burlingame—who has a remarkably small penis—uses Smith's egg-plant recipe in order to impregnate the wife he marries as chief. The child is Chicamec himself, who then takes as his bride a young woman who is the descendant of Father Fitzmaurice. He has three sons; one of whom is white-skinned; another golden skinned; and a third dark-skinned. The first he names Henry Burlingame III and places on a raft. The second and third, Chicamec states, fell in love with white women, and betrayed the Ahatchwoops. Ebenezer calculates that the dark-skinned son became Charley Mattasin, who loved Mary Mungummory and was executed for murder.

Ebenezer strikes a deal with Chicamec whereby, after leaving Bertrand and Captain Cairn as hostages, he will attempt to trace Chicamec's surviving sons and bring them to Bloodsworth Island. After leaving the island, they encounter Mary who, along with the trapper Harvey Russecks, explains that a golden-skinned Indian by the name of Billy Rumbly is living with a white English woman. They then encounter Harvey's brother, Harry, a crooked and violent miller who is jealous of his wife, Roxanne, and daughter, Henrietta. McEvoy plays a trick on Harry that results in Harry becoming gravely injured. It transpires that Roxanne and Henrietta are the mother and daughter who were saved from the clutches of pirates by Henry years earlier. Billy Rumbly arrives and is astonished to hear that his father and lost brother are still alive, but is reluctant to take steps to prevent the imminent conflict with the Indians and slaves. Rumbly leads Ebenezer to his cabin where it transpires that Rumbly's partner is Anna. After hearing of Anna's affection for Henry, Rumbly decides to return to Bloodsworth Island, accompanied by McEvoy. Ebenezer and Anna discover that Roxanne is their former nurse and that Henrietta is their half-sister.

McEvoy returns with Bertrand and Captain Cairn but claims that Rumbly has now sided with the Indians and slaves. Ebenezer and Anna decide to return to Malden along with McEvoy, Henrietta, Bertrand and Roxanne. Their boat is seized by the pirate Ben Avery and the men forced to swim to shore. The women are freed after Ben Avery recognizes Roxanne as a former lover. At Malden, the ownership of the Cooke estate is decided by a court presided over by Governor Nicholson. The claim by Lucy Robotham and her father are rejected. By way of a legal nicety, Malden passes back to the Cooke family because of Joan Toast's marriage to Ebenzer. William Smith and his lawyer Sowter are threatened with imprisonment, but are released after presenting Henry with more of the journal that tells of his ancestor's fate. Together with a fragment held by Joan, this reveals the egg-plant recipe by which Smith and Burlingame increased their penis size and enabled them to fulfill their sexual challenges.

Ebenezer and Joan consummate their marriage, and Joan falls pregnant. Burlingame leaves for Bloodsworth Island in order to quell the rebellion. He returns in Indian guise with the intention of marrying Anna but leaves once more and does not return. Anna falls pregnant, but is saved from disgrace when Joan and her child die in childbirth and Anna's child is reared as Ebenezer's. An epilogue details the fates of the major characters over the years. Ebenezer's epic satire The Sot-Weed Factor meets with some success and acclaim upon its publication in London, but Ebenezer declines to continue composing. Ebenezer and Anna remain in Maryland and survive into their sixties, with Ebenezer returning to poetry some years before his death.

== Writing process ==
The Sot-Weed Factor was initially intended, with Barth's previous two novels, as the concluding novel on a trilogy on nihilism, but the project took a different direction as a consequence of Barth's maturation as a writer.

The novel takes its title from a poem of the same name published in London in 1708 and signed Ebenezer Cooke. "Sot-weed" is an old term for the tobacco plant. A "factor" is a middleman who buys something to resell it. As Barth explained:

The Sot–Weed Factor began with the title and, of course, Ebenezer Cooke's original poem ... Nobody knows where the real chap is buried; I made up a grave for Ebenezer because I wanted to write his epitaph.

Barth also made extensive use of the few pieces of information known at the time about the historical Cooke, his assumed father and grandfather, both called Andrew Cooke, and his sister, Anna.

The novel parodies, mimics, recuperates and rewrites the forms of the 18th century genre of the Bildungsroman (formation novel) and Künstlerroman (novel on the formation of an artist), and in particular Fielding's Tom Jones, Sterne's Tristram Shandy, and Samuel Richardson's three epistolary novels. The narrative presents Ebenezer as a Künstlerroman hero. The novel is also a parody of the picaresque genre, in particular of Tristram Shandy and Tom Jones. One entire chapter in the 1967 edition is in rhyme.

The novel also rewrites the tale of John Smith and Pocahontas, presenting Smith as a boastful and bawdy opportunist, whose narrative of his explorations in Virginia is portrayed as highly fictional and self-serving.

In 1994, Barth said retrospectively that this novel marks his discovery of postmodernism: "Looking back, I am inclined to declare grandly that I needed to discover, or to be discovered by, Postmodernism."

== Publication ==
Barth spent four years writing the original version of the book; it was published by Doubleday in 1960, consisting of about 800 pages. Barth revisited the text for a new hardcover edition issued in 1967 by the same publisher, and shortened it by 60 pages. In 1987, the revised edition was reissued in paperback, in the Doubleday Anchor Edition series, with an added foreword.

The novel has been translated into several languages, including Italian and Japanese.

== Background ==
Before The Sot-Weed Factor Barth published two novels, The Floating Opera (1956) and The End of the Road (1958). Both were in a conventional realistic mode that made The Sot-Weed Factor's excesses a surprise. Barth saw earlier 20th-century modes of writing as having come to a conclusion, exemplified in the writing of Joyce and Kafka, and then in Beckett and Borges. With The Sot-Weed Factor, Barth returned to earlier novel forms, both in their structure and mannerisms as well as in the irony and imitation found in Miguel de Cervantes' Don Quixote and Fielding's Shamela.

== Reception and legacy ==
Critics generally consider The Sot-Weed Factor to mark the beginning of a period in which Barth established himself at the forefront of American literary postmodernism. The works of this period become progressively more metafictional and fabulist. These critics see this period as lasting until LETTERS (1979), and it includes the essays on postmodernism "The Literature of Exhaustion" (1967) and "The Literature of Replenishment" (1980).

Time included it in its list of the 100 best English-language novels from 1923 to 2005, where Richard Lacayo called it "Dense, funny, endlessly inventive".

Harold Bloom included it in his Western Canon; James Wood in his list of best English-language novels since 1945.

A review in Kirkus Reviews compared The Sot-Weed Factor to the works of Rabelais, Boccaccio, Cervantes and Voltaire, but criticized some elements of the book as "pornography and scatology".

Edmund Fuller, writing in The New York Times gave the book a positive review, calling it "a brilliantly specialized performance, so monstrously long that reading it seemed nearly as laborious as writing it" and concluding "though it is not for all palates, it is possible that Barth's book may be cherished by its true audience for some time to come".

Postmodern author Thomas Pynchon includes in his novel Mason & Dixon several excerpts from a fictional poem, the Pennsylvaniad, a clear reference to The Sot-Weed Factor's Marylandiad.

== Adaptation ==
In March 2013, director Steven Soderbergh announced that he would make a 12-hour adaptation of The Sot-Weed Factor with James Greer writing the series adaptation.

== See also ==
- 1960 in literature
- American literature
