= Warlock (Hall novel) =

1958 American western novel by author Oakley Hall

- First edition cover
- Author: Oakley Hall
- Language: English
- Series: Legends West trilogy
- Genre: Western
- Publisher: Viking Press
- Publication date: September 5, 1958
- Publication place: United States
- Media type: Print (hardback)
- Pages: 471
- Dewey Decimal: 813'.54-dc22
- LC Class: PS3558.A373W3
- Followed by: The Bad Lands

Warlock is a Western novel by the American author Oakley Hall. It was published on September 5, 1958, by Viking Press. The story is set in the early 1880s, in a fictional southwestern mining town called Warlock and its vicinity. The novel's characters and many elements of its plot are loosely based on actual people and events from Tombstone, Arizona, during the same time period, including Wyatt Earp and the Gunfight at the O.K. Corral. It has been described as a precursor to, or early example of, the revisionist western, due to its moral ambiguity and satirical commentary on Cold-War-era American society. The novel was a finalist for the 1958 Pulitzer Prize.

Hall's subsequent novels The Bad Lands (1978) and Apaches (1986) are sequels to Warlock, though they do not portray the same principal characters or setting. The three novels together form the Legends West trilogy.

In 1959, the novel was adapted into the film Warlock starring Henry Fonda, Richard Widmark and Anthony Quinn.

== Plot ==
When violence threatens the frontier boomtown of Warlock, a Citizens' Committee determines to take action against criminal cowboys and cattle rustlers. A gunslinger named Clay Blaisedell, who has achieved considerable renown in Texas, is hired as town marshal to keep the peace. He is followed to Warlock by his close friend Tom Morgan, a gambler and saloon owner with a sour reputation, and Kate Dollar, a former prostitute bent on vengeance. Though Blaisedell at first manages to assert his authority with his stolid demeanor and expert gunmanship, Abe McQuown and his troublesome gang of cowboys seek to antagonize him.

One of McQuown's former associates, John "Bud" Gannon, hopes to repent for the horrors of his past by becoming a deputy sheriff in Warlock, while his younger brother Billy continues to ride with McQuown. Bud's decision unsettles both the gang and the town's citizens, and he is forced to confront suspicion about his loyalties from both sides while trying to maintain his official neutrality. When Blaisedell declares several of McQuown's company banned from Warlock, the outlaws disobey the posting and ride into town. Morgan saves Blaisedell from an ambush in the ensuing shootout, and three of the outlaws, including Billy Gannon, are killed. Much of the town expects Bud to retaliate against Blaisedell out of respect for his brother, but the deputy remains impartial. Anticipating the ferocity of rumor that will inevitably surround accounts of the gunfight and wanting to avoid the distrust and resentment of the town, Blaisedell turns himself in for trial in neighboring Bright's City on the charge of murder.

Meanwhile, employees of the local silver mines go on strike, demanding better pay and a new boss. Doctor Wagner, the town physician, is the miners' staunchest advocate, but implores them to organize a union and negotiate peacefully rather than resort to mob violence and sabotage. At the same time, the Citizens' Committee tries to avert open conflict by formally requesting Warlock's incorporation as the seat of a new county, which would permit them to hire their own full-time sheriff. They are discouraged by lengthy delays and the general reluctance of officials in Bright's City to hear their pleas, including the commander of the resident army detachment, General Peach, a decorated veteran of the Apache Wars whose senility borders on complete insanity. As tensions mount and rumors swirl, the concepts of morality and justice in the legal no-man's-land become ever more ambiguous.

Blaisedell is soon acquitted of murder but resigns his position as town marshal and begins dealing faro at Morgan's saloon. Kate Dollar takes an interest in Bud Gannon, seeking to use him to enact her retribution upon Blaisedell and Morgan for orchestrating the murder of her fiancé back in Texas.

Some time later, Gannon commits to his role as the town's deputy, while McQuown becomes more and more paranoid that Blaisedell plans to have him killed. McQuown's associate Curley Burne returns to town and accidentally kills a deputy named Carl Schroeder in a scuffle, though it is widely believed that the act was murder. In response, Blaisedell takes up his role as Marshal once more, killing Burne when he refuses to leave town. Much debate ensues throughout Warlock as to Blaisedell's authority to mete out justice.

From afar, McQuown plots to ride into Warlock with numerous cowboys and cause chaos. Gannon rides out to tell McQuown to stay out of Warlock, but McQuown refuses and stabs Gannon through the hand. As Gannon rides away, he hears gunfire and chaos at McQuown's camp. A day later, McQuown's men arrive in Warlock with a casket, claiming Gannon murdered McQuown before leaving. McQuown's father allows the matter to be put before a judge named Holloway, who clears Gannon of suspicion. Unbeknownst to them, McQuown's true killer is Morgan.

Warlock descends into chaos as General Peach arrives with the United States Cavalry to arrest striking miners. Blaisedell finds he cannot bring himself to defy the military in defense of Warlock's citizens, allowing Peach to beat him viciously. That night, Morgan, whom the town has begun to turn against, provokes Blaisedell into killing him to try and save his friend's reputation. This act seems to break Blaisedell, leading him to burn down Morgan's gambling hall. Under threat of arrest by Gannon the next morning, he throws down his guns and leaves Warlock forever.

== Reception ==
Hall's most famous novel, Warlock was a finalist for the 1958 Pulitzer Prize and has since been hailed as a classic of American West literature. Michelle Latiolais, a professor of English at the University of California, Irvine, described Warlock as belonging to the "pantheon of western masterpieces" alongside Cormac McCarthy's Blood Meridian and John Williams's Butcher's Crossing.

Thomas Pynchon and Richard Fariña were fans of the novel when they were students at Cornell University. In an introduction to Fariña's Been Down So Long It Looks Like Up To Me, Pynchon writes, "We set about getting others to read it too, and for a while we had a micro-cult going. Soon a number of us were talking in Warlock dialogue, a kind of thoughtful, stylized Victorian-Wild West diction." Pynchon praised it for restoring "to the myth of Tombstone its full, mortal, blooded humanity" and for showing "that what is called society, with its law and order, is as frail, as precarious, as flesh and can be snuffed out and assimilated into the desert as easily as a corpse can. It is the deep sensitivity to abysses that makes Warlock one of our best American novels." Robert Stone was another fan, and wrote the introduction to the New York Review Books Classics edition. Cormac McCarthy put it on a list of novels that inspired Blood Meridian.
