= Butcher's Crossing =

1960 western novel by John Williams

- First edition cover
- Author: John Williams
- Language: English
- Genre: Western fiction
- Publisher: Macmillan
- Publication date: 1960
- Publication place: United States
- Media type: Print
- Preceded by: Nothing but the Night
- Followed by: Stoner

Butcher's Crossing is a western novel by John Williams, originally published in 1960. The story follows William Andrews, a young Harvard student who leaves his life behind to explore the American West. The book begins and ends in the fictional frontier town of Butcher's Crossing, Kansas, in the early 1870s, where Andrews joins a buffalo-hunting expedition. He and the people he meets along the way must confront and survive the brutal realities of nature in their attempts to get buffalo hides to sell. Along the way, Andrews contemplates his purpose in life with respect to nature, specifically through the influence of Ralph Waldo Emerson.

== Background ==
Butcher's Crossing is the second novel by John Williams, preceded by Nothing but the Night. It is considered by many to be among the first pioneers of a more "realistic" breed of western novel, along with a few other notable works including Cormac McCarthy's Blood Meridian and Oakley Hall's Warlock. Reflecting on the state of the western genre at the time of writing Butcher's Crossing, Williams wrote: "The subject of the West has undergone a process of mindless stereotyping". Williams' response to this stereotyping came in the form of Butcher's Crossing, in which the harshness of life on the Western frontier is emphasized. The novel features a protagonist, Will Andrews, who is deeply influenced by the idea of human–nature harmony found in Emersonian philosophy.

== Characters ==
- Will Andrews is the main character. Will is 23 years old, a minister's son, and a third-year Harvard student. Inspired by the writings of Ralph Waldo Emerson and a pull to the wild, Andrews quits college to "find himself in the great West."
- Miller: Miller is an experienced hunter and mountain man and a zealous guide of the wild whom Andrews meets in Butcher's Crossing and who convinces Andrews to go on a buffalo-hunting expedition with him. He prides himself on his trade.
- Charley Hoge: Charley is a one-handed veteran of frontier life, Miller's chief hunting companion, and an alcoholic. He accompanies Andrews and Miller on their hunt. He always carries his Bible on him and often brings up controversial religious topics that cause debate in the group.
- Fred Schneider: Schneider is a hide-skinner who accompanies Andrews, Miller, and Charley on the buffalo hunt. He is independent-minded and often the voice of dissent when the group faces a serious decision.
- Francine: a "whore-with-a-heart-of-gold" with whom Andrews finds companionship.
- J.D. McDonald: McDonald knew Andrews' father years ago; he is a buffalo-hide trader and a financier of hunting expeditions living in Butcher's Crossing.

== Plot ==
William Andrews, a Harvard student in the early 1870s, is not happy with the mundanities of everyday life. After becoming inspired by the poetry and philosophy of Ralph Waldo Emerson, he decides to leave his home in Boston and spend some time in the wilderness. While he is there, he hopes to discover who he really is.

Andrews travels across the country and finds his way to Butcher's Crossing, a tiny frontier town on the Kansas plains which is supported mostly by the business of local hunters and cattle ranchers, and which eagerly awaits the economic prosperity promised by the construction of a railroad through the town. Andrews seeks out J.D. McDonald, an old acquaintance of his father's, and finds him running a lucrative business in the trade of buffalo hides on the edge of town. McDonald offers Will a job doing paperwork for him, but Will turns him down, explaining that he's looking for a different kind of experience in the West; McDonald chastises him for his youthful idealism and naivety, but points him to a local hunter named Miller. Miller is a seasoned mountain man and expert buffalo hunter and talks Andrews into joining him on a hunting trip. Miller claims to have stumbled upon a remote mountain vale in Colorado years ago, where a rare buffalo herd lives that few people have ever seen and which therefore promises a big payout. Andrews agrees to finance the trip, if only because he is looking for adventure. Miller leaves behind Andrews and Charley Hoge, Miller's one-armed wagon driver, as he takes Andrews' money to Ellsworth to buy supplies. Hoge is a quiet and pious Christian and a fierce alcoholic who proves a challenge in conversation since he seems almost single-mindedly focused on his Bible and his whiskey; he likes to say Bible verses aloud, but Andrews believes that he knows all that he needs to about God. While Andrews waits for Miller to return, he sits in his hotel room and contemplates his life and the natural world around him. He meets a prostitute named Francine who is attracted to him, but Andrews is unnerved by his perceptions of her profession and refuses to sleep with her.

Miller eventually returns with a hired skinner named Fred Schneider, who will make the fourth member of the group, and the expedition quickly departs Butcher's Crossing to reach the mountains before winter. Relying solely on Miller's memory of the trail and knowledge of the landscape, the group cuts overland, off the blazed trail, as Miller insists on his ability to find water, to the annoyance of Schneider, who had argued for following the river. The expedition almost fails after several days without water, but on the third day, they find a stream. The group finally arrives in the foothills of the Rocky Mountains and Miller leads them to a scarcely used trail that takes them over a pass and into the hidden valley he had promised. They immediately see that the pristine valley is filled with an enormous herd of buffalo, numbering in the thousands. They set up a base camp and quickly begin the hunt. Miller carefully plans a systematic extermination that will prevent the herd from breaking up into smaller herds or escaping the valley; he serves as the primary rifler while Andrews and Schneider work at skinning the hides from the fallen corpses and Charley Hoge picks up the hides in the wagon. Andrews is at first appalled and sickened by the mass slaughter, by the reduction of the noble buffalo to skinless and fly-ridden hunks of meat, but as the days pass he is inured to the sight and smell of death. He also becomes more proficient as an outdoorsman and skinner. Though the valley floor is soon littered with the corpses of the beasts and the group collects many more hides than they can carry with them back to Butcher's Crossing, Miller becomes obsessed with killing every single buffalo, and he often kills as many as a hundred a day. Reveling in the slaughter, the men lose track of time.

Miller insists that the group remain in the valley until the entire herd is exterminated, but while blocking the escape of several small herds trying to leave the valley, a massive blizzard buries the valley in snow. Without time to build a more suitable shelter, the men nearly freeze to death and are forced to fashion crude sleeping bags out of raw buffalo hides. After several days of incessant snowfall, the expedition realizes that they are stranded until the snow melts and the pass becomes usable again–which means they will be waiting until the spring, very likely a duration of six to eight months. Throughout the winter, each man retreats into himself: Charley ceases to do his job, Schneider talks only to himself, and Miller hunts and disappears into the forest for entire days. Eventually, the winter recedes and the group manage to recapture the oxen and horses which they had allowed to go wild over the winter, and load up half the hides on the wagon, to return for the rest later in the year. The men manage to force the rickety load back over the pass and return to the plains, but soon come to a river swollen with the spring snowmelt. As Schneider and Charley Hoge cautiously lead the team across, a large log floats downriver, knocking Schneider's horse off its feet and spilling the precariously balanced wagon into the river. Schneider is killed when his flailing horse kicks him in the head and he drowns, and all of the hides are lost to the fast-moving waters.

Devastated, Andrews, Miller, and Charley Hoge return to Butcher's Crossing, but find the town mostly deserted: the hotels and saloons are unused, entire buildings have disappeared, and the few faces occupying them are all different. McDonald, who had offered to buy their furs upon their return, no longer runs his business and the men later find him sleeping in an abandoned building. He tells them that his business was ruined when the market for buffalo hides fell through while they were gone, and that all of their work has been worthless. The railroad ended up being constructed fifty miles to the north of town, and Butcher's Crossing is dying. McDonald criticizes Andrews for not listening to him, but again offers him the chance to work with him back in Boston. Andrews again refuses. Miller spirals into depression, eventually burning McDonald's stockpiled buffalo hides and riding into the night, followed by Charley Hoge. Andrews begins a brief relationship with Francine before leaving her most of his money and riding away from town.

== Themes ==
Several of Butcher's Crossing's themes revolve around the plot in William Andrews' quest to find himself in the vast expanses of the unsettled West. Many reviewers of the book have considered the theme of nature to be prevalent in the novel. Ideas regarding Ralph Waldo Emerson's takes on nature, especially that of transcendentalism and the Transparent Eyeball, centralize Andrews' experience in the wilderness. The theme of nature is challenged by the theme of societal expansion, and the novel uses comparisons between the purity of nature and the development of society to create this binary. The theme of nature and the natural world even leads to additional themes that include man vs. nature, more specifically, human drive, motivation, and endurance, as William discovers how powerful nature is and must use all of his strength to survive it. Additionally, Butcher's Crossing explores the theme of self-realization, and the components that play a role in understanding one's self, which includes maturity, a loss of innocence, and the exploration of one's spiritual standing. According to reviewer Derek Harmening, Butcher's Crossing includes themes such as "imperialism, manifest destiny, perils of the free market, the enduring contempt of Native Americans (and anything else that existed on American soil before Europeans did, really), and—perhaps most importantly—man’s eternal judgment."

== Style ==
Butcher's Crossing is considered a classic romantic American western, but one written with complete seriousness. Williams's take on the classic western includes not only common western themes but a reflection of America itself, and the deconstruction of the American Dream, as well as incorporating ideas of destiny and Emerson's concept of being one with nature. John Williams' way of writing is straightforward but gives a gritty look into the behavior of man and nature, and explores the madness that can overcome them when they merge with one another.

== Reception ==
The reception of Butcher's Crossing, though somewhat mixed, is predominantly positive. Author and Pulitzer Prize nominee Oakley Hall called Butcher's Crossing "the finest western ever written." Adam Foulds, a writer for The Spectator magazine, agreed: "The novel culminates beautifully in action and stingingly in thought." A writer for The Guardian, Nicholas Lezard, found himself especially intrigued by Williams' ability to focus on events that drive the story. He writes:

"Williams, in reducing the elements of his story to nothing more than close attention to events, has produced something timeless and great. And in its pitiless depiction of men reduced to the most basic and extreme of situations--thirst, cold, heat, exhaustion, isolation, not to mention the undesirability of each other's company--this book very nicely fits into the contemporary vogue for survival-manual entertainment."

Waggish calls Butcher's Crossing "the most flawed, the most peculiar, and the most exuberant of Williams' three mature novels." The article also comments on Williams' writing in Butcher's Crossing as compared to his two other novels, saying, "Williams' writing is a little too lush and artful in Butcher's Crossing, lacking the architectural precision of the later two novels. He is still a wonderful writer, but one is more conscious of him making an effort." Archie Bland, a writer for Independent magazine agrees with this, saying that parts of Butcher's Crossing, specifically the ending, do not quite hold up to his later novel Stoner.

=== Additional reviews ===
- Express Review: calls Butcher's Crossing "a masterpiece"

== Film adaptation ==
A feature film adaptation of the novel, directed by Gabe Polsky and starring Nicolas Cage as Miller and Fred Hechinger as Andrews, premiered at the 2022 Toronto International Film Festival, and was released in the United States by Saban Films on October 20, 2023.
