= Michelle Latiolais =

American author and academic (born 1956)

- Born: 1956 (age 69–70); Denver, Colorado, U.S.

Academic background
- Education: University of California, Irvine (MFA); University of Denver (MA)
- Influences: John Edward Williams

Academic work
- Institutions: University of California, Irvine

Michelle Latiolais (born 1956) is an American author and academic known for the novels She, A Proper Knowledge, and Even Now, which received the Gold Medal for Fiction from the Commonwealth Club of California. She is a professor of English at the University of California, Irvine, where she co-directs the Programs in Writing.

== Background ==
Latiolais was born in Denver, Colorado, in 1956. She received a Master in Fine Arts in fiction and poetry from the University of California, Irvine and a Master of Arts from the University of Denver, where she was taught by novelist John Edward Williams. She later wrote the introduction to the New York Review Books Classic edition of Williams' novel Butcher's Crossing.

She lives in Los Angeles.

== Bibliography ==
- Even Now (1990)
- A Proper Knowledge (2008)
- Widow (2011)
- She (2016)
