= Clarksville, Texas =

- City
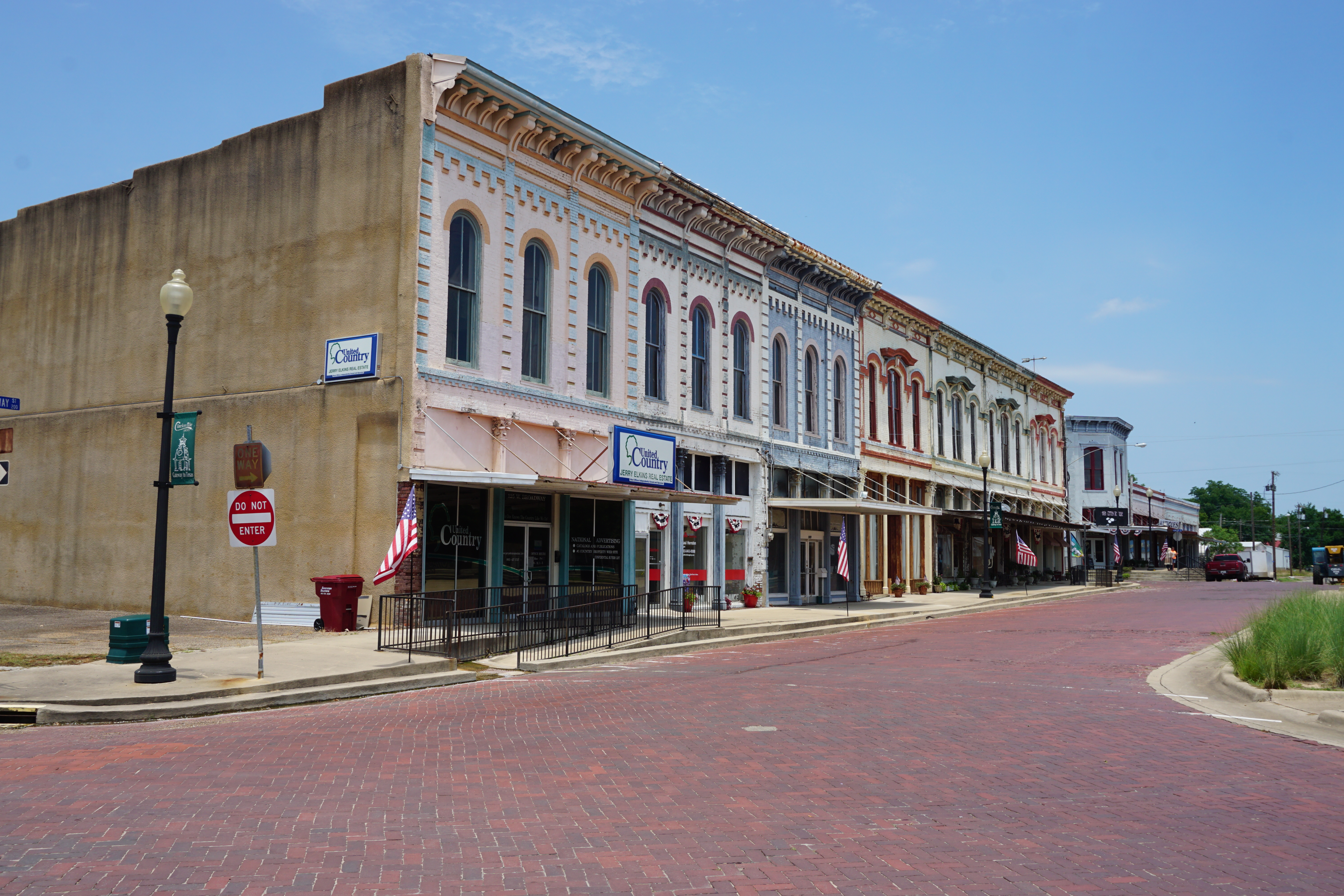
- Broadway Street in Clarksville

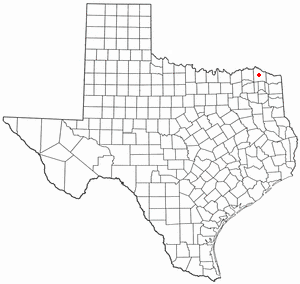
- Location of Clarksville, Texas

- Coordinates: 33°37′12″N 95°03′20″W
- Country: United States
- State: Texas
- County: Red River

Area
  - Total: 3.06 sq mi (7.93 km^{2})
  - Land: 3.06 sq mi (7.93 km^{2})
  - Water: 0 sq mi (0.00 km^{2})
- Elevation: 436 ft (133 m)

Population (2020)
  - Total: 2,857
  - Density: 1,003.6/sq mi (387.48/km^{2})
- Time zone: UTC-6 (Central (CST))
  - Summer (DST): UTC-5 (CDT)
- ZIP code: 75426
- Area codes: 430, 903
- FIPS code: 48-15160
- GNIS feature ID: 2409470
- Website: clarksvilletx.com

Clarksville is a city in and the county seat of Red River County, Texas, United States, in the northernmost part of the Piney Woods region of East Texas. As of the 2020 census, the city's population was 2,857.

== History ==
Clarksville was established by James Clark, who moved to the area in 1833 and laid out a town site. When Red River County was organized in 1835, Clarksville was chosen as the county seat, beating out the community of La Grange (later named Madras). Isaac Smathers built one of the first houses, which was later owned by Charles DeMorse. (Note: DeMorse began publication of the Clarksville Northern Standard in 1842.) The town was incorporated by an act of the Texas Congress in 1837, and within a few years, it became an educational and agricultural center.

In 1841, John W.P. McKenzie, a Methodist minister, retired from serving as a missionary and moved to a former plantation about 3 miles (4.8 km) south-southwest of Clarksville. Naming his new home Itinerant's Retreat, he soon began offering classes for boys who lived in the surrounding area. During that same year, 16 boys enrolled in classes in his home. With more demand than he could accommodate in his home, he had a log cabin built on the plantation to serve as a more conventional school. As the enrollment grew, he added three large wooden buildings to serve as dormitories and opened the school to girls and boarding students. (Note: Two of the new buildings were for boys and one was for girls.) By 1854, McKenzie College had 300 students and 9 faculty members participating in a 10-month school year.

Before the American Civil War began, Rev. McKenzie's school was the largest institution of higher education in Texas during the 1850s and trained almost all of the new Methodist ministers in the state. Although the school was always considered a Methodist institution, it actually continued to be owned by McKenzie. He tried to turn it over to the local Methodist Conference in 1855 and 1860, but each time, the conference declined to accept certain unspecified conditions, so the official transfer never occurred.

By the fall of 1861, most of the male students had already enlisted in the Confederate Army. In 1863, the school had only 33 students. The average number rose to 74 during the years 1864–1867. Unable to obtain sufficient financing to continue, Rev. McKenzie closed the school permanently on June 25, 1868.

In 1844, Clarksville Female Academy opened, after moving from Pine Creek, where it was originally founded in 1840. A Clarksville post office opened in 1846, and by 1838, semiweekly mail service was available between Clarksville and Natchitoches, Louisiana.

A frame courthouse was built in 1840 and replaced with a brick structure on the main square in 1850. A brick jail was built nearby in 1852. The First Presbyterian Church was organized in Shiloh, Gregg County, Texas in 1838, but relocated to Clarksville in 1844. The Texas State Historical Society says this is "...among the oldest continually operating Protestant churches in the state."

The Texas State Historical Society also reports that Clarksville was the most important commercial center in this part of Texas from the late 1830s until the Civil War. Once the Red River proved navigable by steamboats, goods could be shipped directly from New Orleans to Rowland's Landing, 15 miles (24 km) north of Clarksville, then hauled overland by wagon. By the time the war broke out, the city had a population around 900.

Economic recovery from the Civil War was stimulated when the Texas and Pacific Railway reached Clarksville in 1872, bringing new settlers and new businesses. The 1870 census showed a population of 613. (Note: Down nearly 32% since the war started) By 1885, the population had grown to about 1,200. The city could then boast of a new limestone courthouse, five white and two black churches, a Catholic convent, three schools, two banks, two flour mills, and a weekly newspaper, the Clarksville Times.

In 1914, the city had 3,000 residents and had added a waterworks, two newspapers, an ice plant, and an electric power plant. After that, outside events such as two world wars, the Great Depression, and increased competition from other cities (e.g., Dallas, Paris, Bonham, and Texarkana) had begun to slow Clarksville's growth. As shown by the census table, the population in 2000 was very near to that in 1920.

On November 4, 2022, a tornado outbreak occurred in Texas and Oklahoma, which produced a violent EF4 tornado near Clarksville.

Historical population
Census	Pop.	Note	%±
1870	613		—
1890	1,588		—
1900	2,069		30.3%
1910	2,065		−0.2%
1920	3,386		64.0%
1930	2,952		−12.8%
1940	4,095		38.7%
1950	4,353		6.3%
1960	3,851		−11.5%
1970	3,346		−13.1%
1980	4,917		47.0%
1990	4,311		−12.3%
2000	3,883		−9.9%
2010	3,285		−15.4%
2020	2,857		−13.0%
U.S. Decennial Census

== Geography ==
Located 58 miles (93 km) northwest of Texarkana near the center of the county, it is at the junctions of U.S. Highway 82, State Highway 37, and Farm to Market roads 114, 412, 909, 910, and 1159.

According to the United States Census Bureau, the city has a total area of 3.0 square miles (7.8 km^{2}), all land.

== Demographics ==
=== 2020 census ===
As of the 2020 census, Clarksville had a population of 2,857 people and 854 families residing in the city. The median age was 45.0; 21.7% of the residents were under 18 and 22.6% were 65 or older. The female/male ratio was 1:0.902 overall and 1:0.874 for those 18 and over.

Of the 1,225 households in Clarksville, 25.2% had children under 18 living in them, 28.4% were married-couple households, 23.0% were households with a male householder and no spouse or partner present, and 42.0% were households with a female householder and no spouse or partner present. About 39.0% of all households were made up of individuals, and 18.5% had someone living alone who was 65 age or older.

The city had 1,497 housing units, of which 18.2% were vacant. Among occupied housing units, 53.0% were owner-occupied and 47.0% were renter-occupied. The homeowner vacancy rate was 2.2% and the rental vacancy rate was 10.0%.

None of the residents lived in urban areas, while 100.0% lived in rural areas.

Racial composition as of the 2020 census
Race	Percentage	Number
White	40.1%	1,147
Black or African American	46.0%	1,313
American Indian and Alaska Native	0.8%	22
Asian	0.8%	23
Some other race	6.9%	198
Two or more races	5.4%	154
Hispanic or Latino (of any race)	10.5%	299

=== 2000 census ===
As of the 2000 census, 3,883 people, 1,530 households, and 1,006 families were living in the city. The population density was 1,299.2 people per square mile (501.6 people/km^{2}). The 1,787 housing units had an average density of 597.9 per square mile (230.9/km^{2}). The racial makeup of the city was 53.39% White, 42.18% African American, 0.21% Native American, 0.26% Asian, 3.01% from other races, and 0.95% from two or more races. Hispanics or Latinos of any race were 7.29% of the population.

Of the 1,530 households, 31.4% had children under 18 living with them, 42.3% were married couples living together, 19.1% had a female householder with no husband present, and 34.2% were not families. About 31.5% of all households were made up of individuals, and 16.8% had someone living alone who was 65 or older. The average household size was 2.44 and the average family size was 3.04.

In the city, the age distribution was 26.8% under 18, 8.6% from 18 to 24, 25.4% from 25 to 44, 18.9% from 45 to 64, and 20.3% who were 65 or older. The median age was 37 years. For every 100 females, there were 85.4 males. For every 100 females 18 and over, there were 78.7 males.

The median income in the city for a household was $23,655 and for a family was $31,729. Males had a median income of $21,635 versus $16,189 for females. The per capita income for the city was $13,487. About 17.6% of families and 23.7% of the population were below the poverty line, including 39.2% of those under 18 and 15.1% of those 65 or over.

== Education ==
The area is served by the Clarksville Independent School District.

== Infrastructure ==
=== Transportation ===
==== Highways ====
- U.S. Route 82
- Texas State Highway 37
- Farm to Market 909
- Farm to Market 910
- Farm to Market 1159

==== Air ====
Clarksville/Red River County Airport (ICAO: KLBR, FAA LID: LBR), also known as J. D. Trissell Field, is a public-use airport located 3 nautical miles (6 km) southwest of the central business district of Clarksville. It is owned by Clarksville and Red River County. In its October 2024 update to the National Plan of Integrated Airport Systems, the Federal Aviation Administration categorized it as a general aviation facility, its basic classification for minor airports without scheduled airline service, and reported that 18 aircraft were based at the airport. (Note: The NPIAS does not include a detailed breakdown of based aircraft by type.) The facility covers an area of 78 acres (32 ha) and has one runway, designated 18/36 with an asphalt surface measuring 3,000 by 50 feet (914 x 15 m).

==== Trails ====
Clarksville is located on the Northeast Texas Trail (NETT), a 130 mi (210 km) hike-and-bike trail from Farmersville, Texas, to New Boston, Texas, which follows a disused railroad right-of-way railbanked by the Union Pacific Railroad and Chaparral Railroad in the 1990s.

== Notable landmarks ==
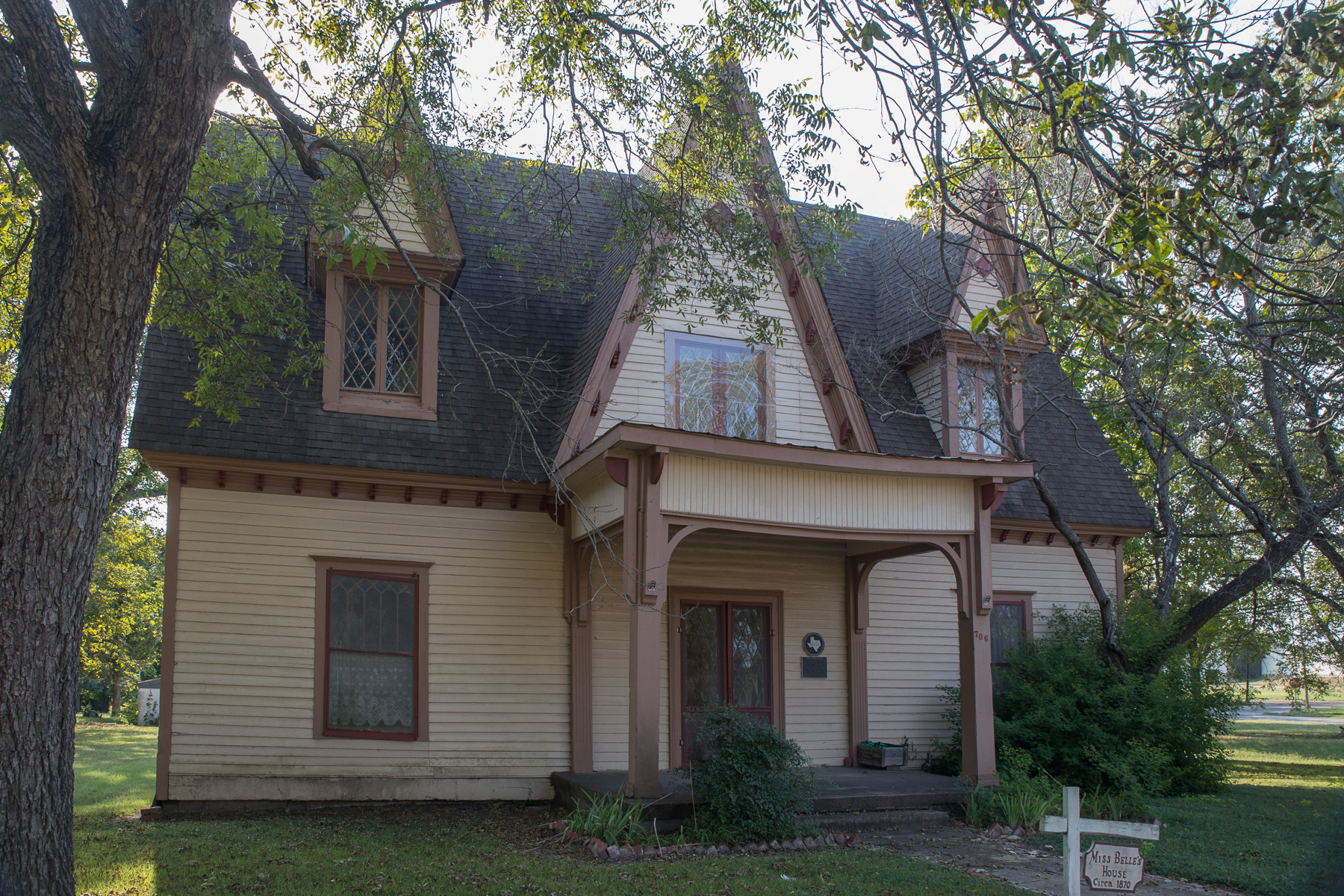
Andrew Thompson House

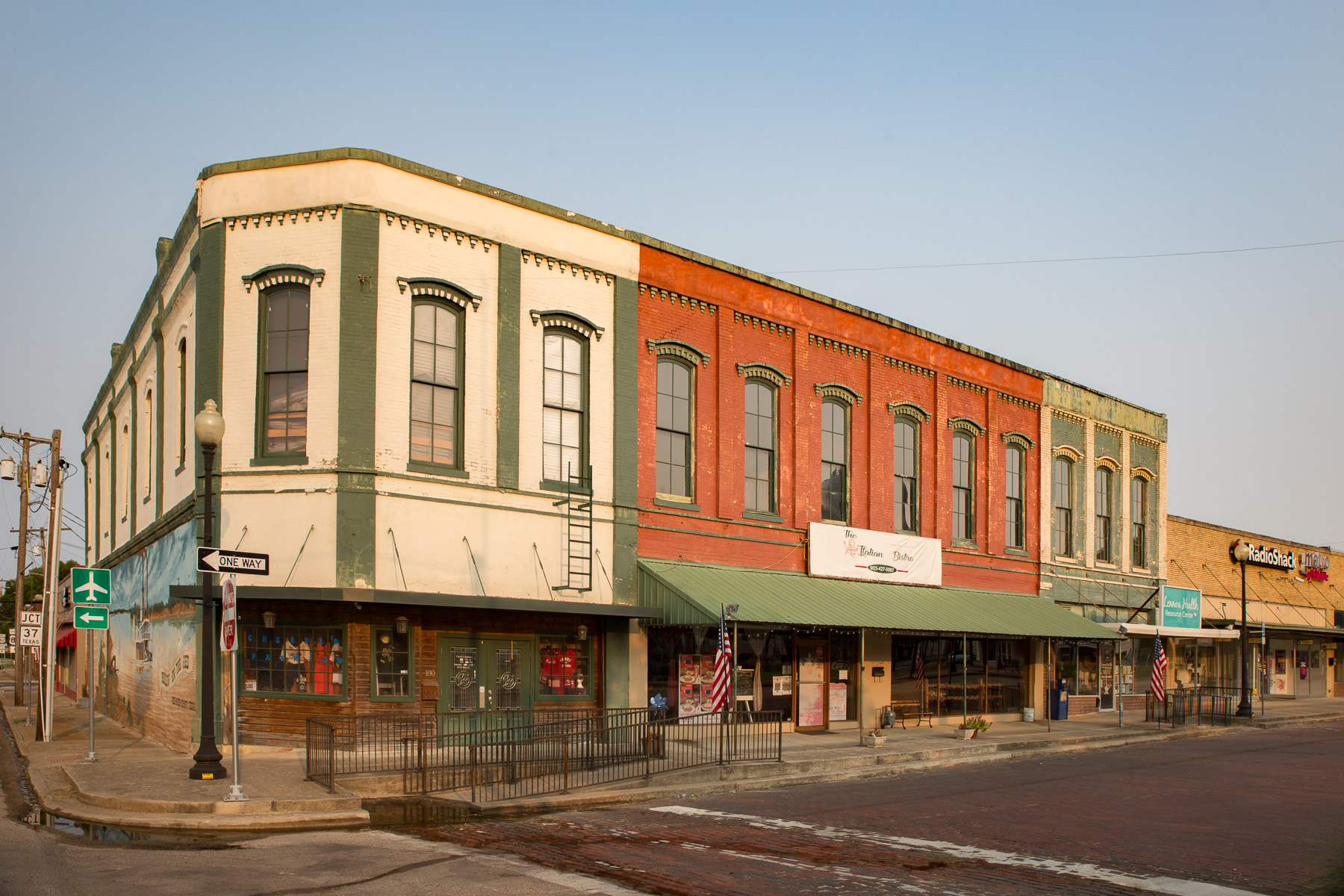
Buildings in Clarksville town square

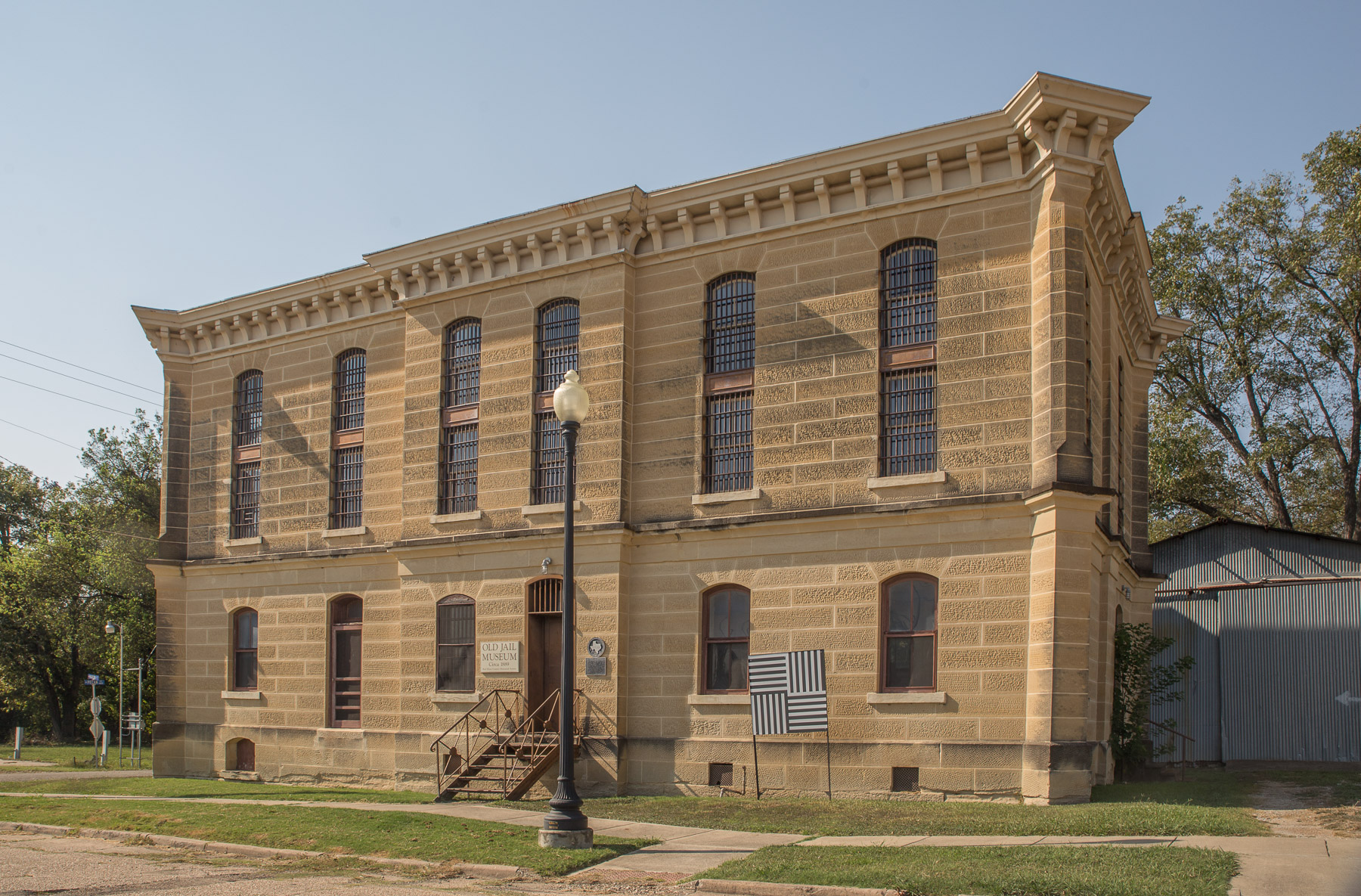
Old Red River County Jail

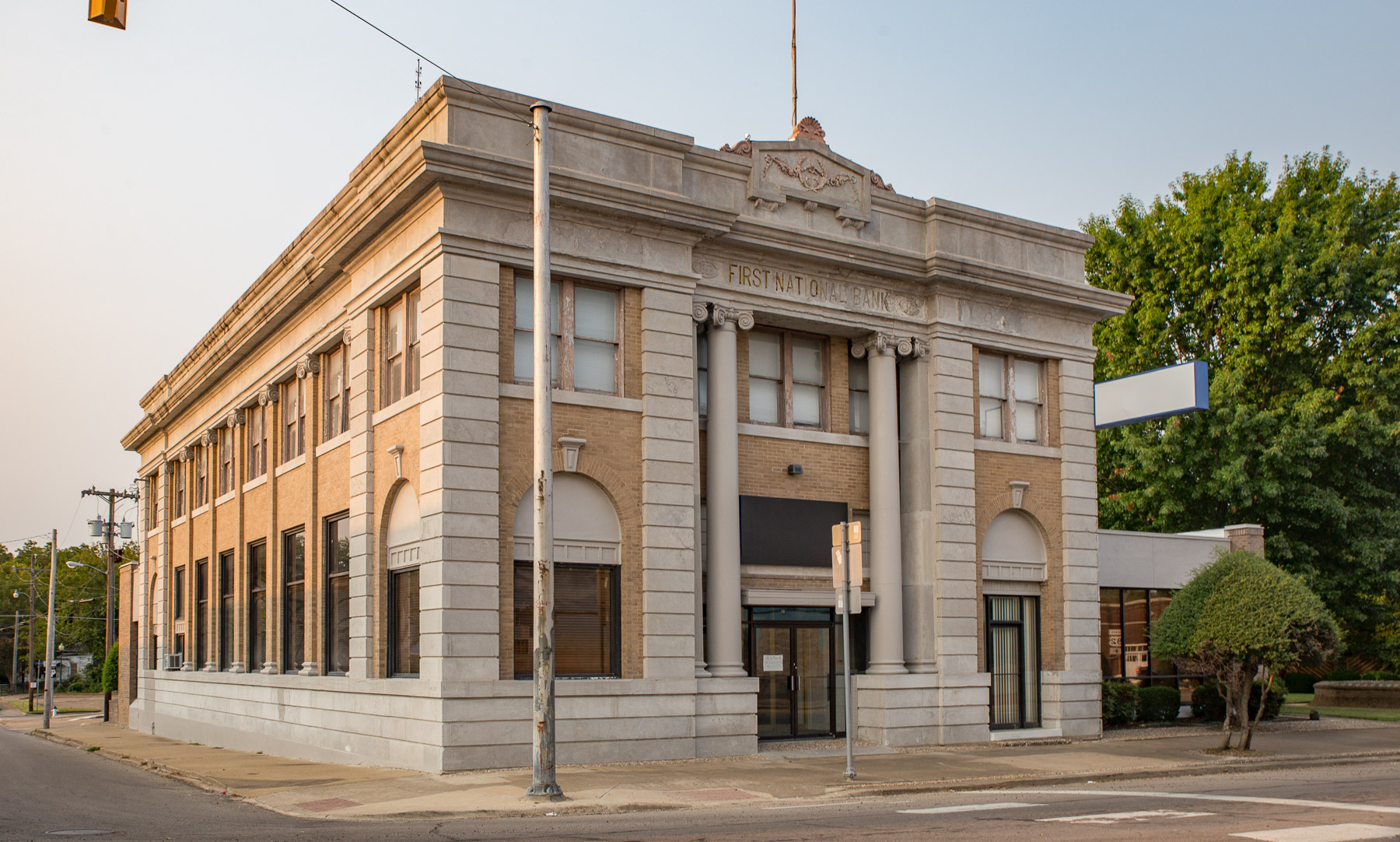
First National Bank building

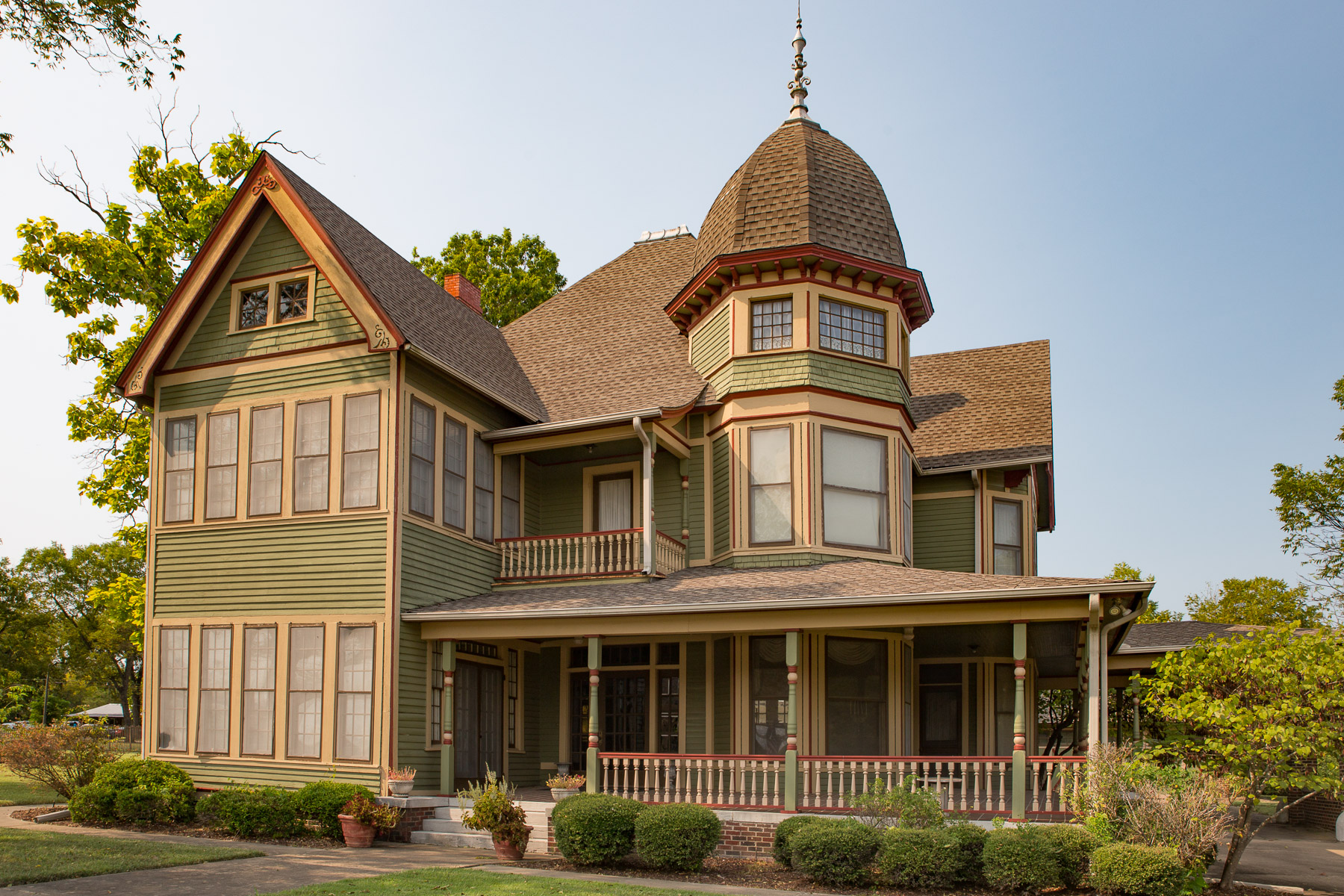
Lennox House

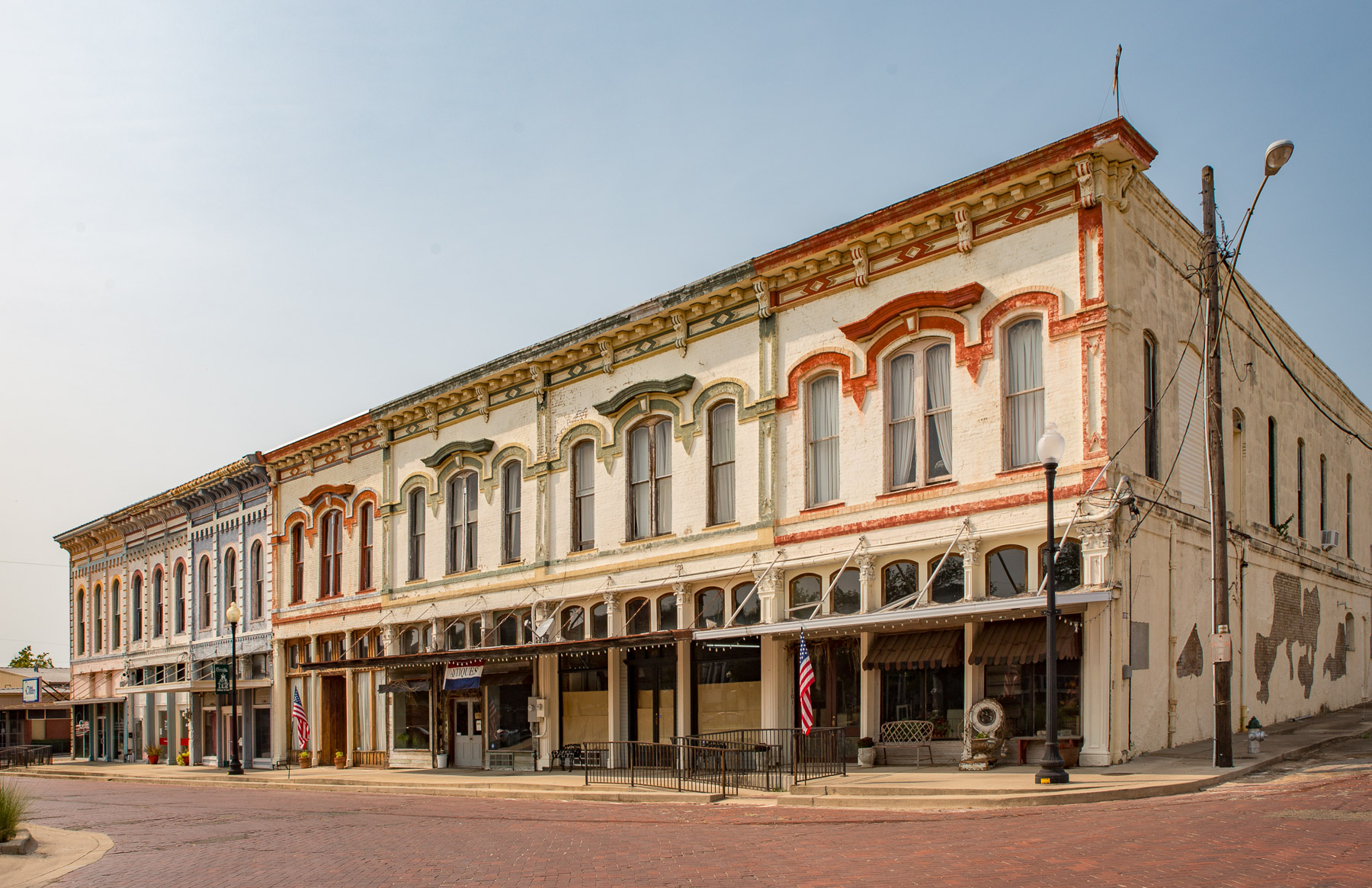
Buildings in Clarksville town square

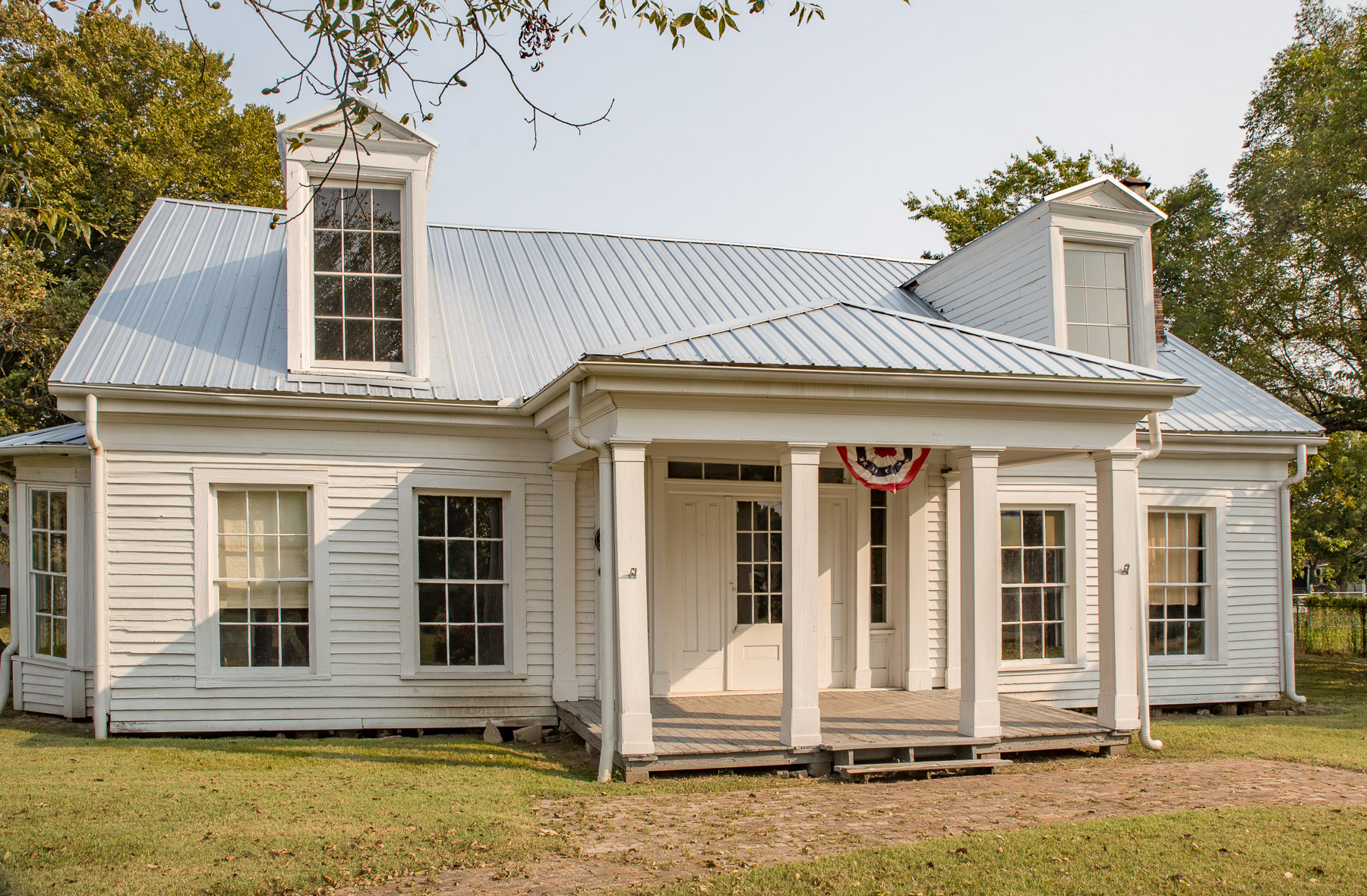
Smathers-Demorse House

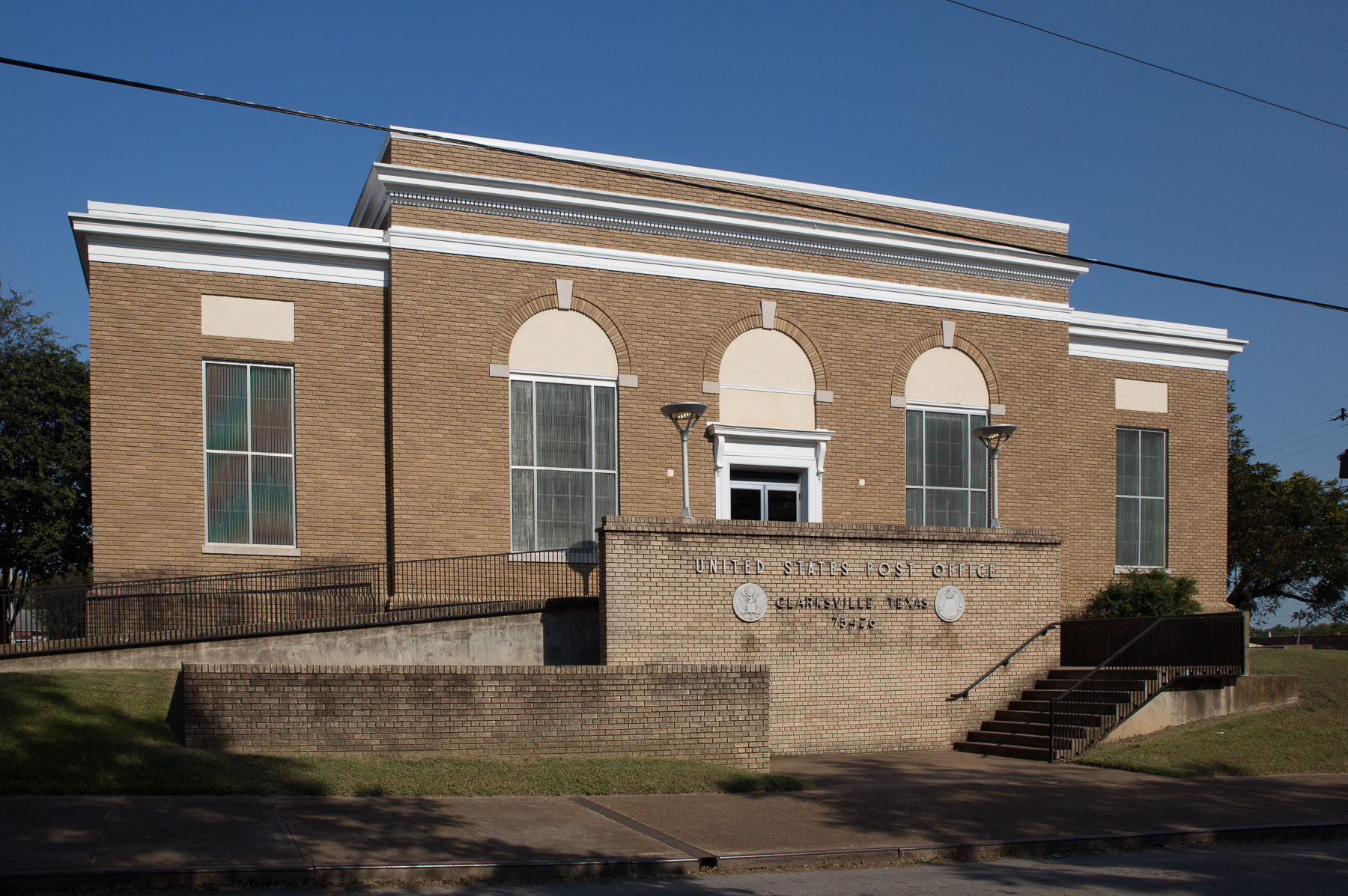
United States Post Office

== Notable people ==
- John B. Denton was a preacher who lived here and after whom Denton County and the City of Denton are named.
- Stacey Dillard formerly played defensive lineman in the National Football League.
- Euell Gibbons was an author of cookbooks and foraging guides, proponent of natural diets, and television personality popular in the 1960s and 1970s.
- William Humphrey was the author of National Book Award nominee Home from the Hill, which was made into a movie shot on location in and around Clarksville in the late 1950s.
- Tommie Smith, set the world and Olympic records with a time of 19.83 seconds and became the 200-meter Olympic champion at the 1968 Summer Olympics, which were held in Mexico
- J. D. Tippit, a Dallas police officer, was shot and killed by Lee Harvey Oswald about 45 minutes after Oswald assassinated President John F. Kennedy
- Gary VanDeaver, is a Republican member of the Texas House of Representatives from District 1 and the former superintendent of the New Boston Independent School District in New Boston, Texas. He was reared in Clarksville and graduated in 1977 from Clarksville High School
- John Williams, is the author of Stoner and National Book Award co-winner Augustus

== Climate ==
The climate in this area is characterized by hot, humid summers and generally mild to cool winters. According to the Köppen climate classification system, Clarksville has a humid subtropical climate, Cfa on climate maps.

== See also ==
- Brevelle Lake
- Sulphur River
