= Self-insertion =

Literary device where the author writes themself into their fictional story

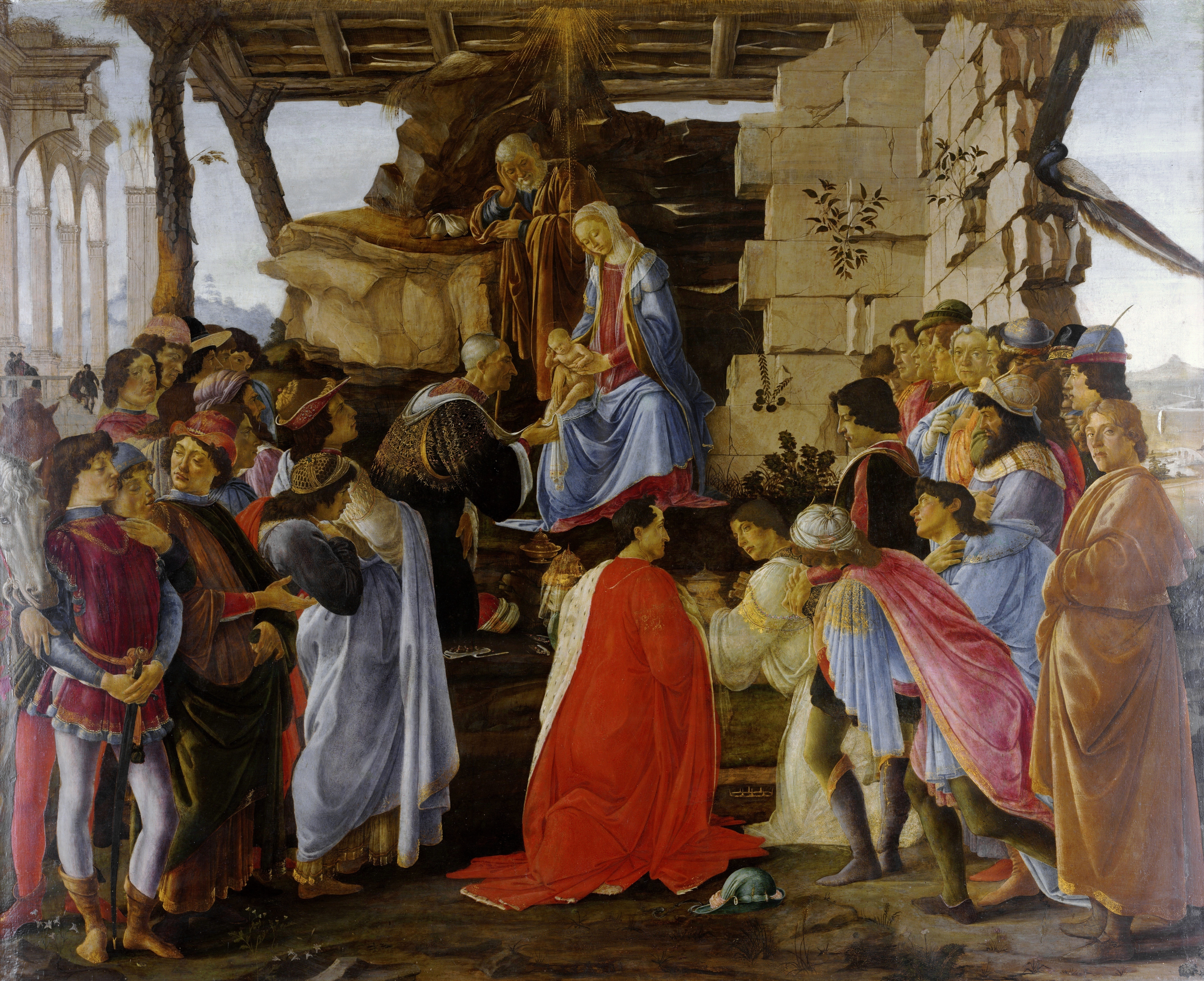
Sandro Botticelli's painting of the Adoration of the Magi has an inserted self-portrait at the far right: the position in the corner and the gaze out to the viewer are very typical of such self-portraits.

Self-insertion is a literary device in which the author writes themselves into the story under the guise of, or from the perspective of, a fictional character (see author surrogate). The character, overtly or otherwise, behaves like, has the personality of, and may even be described as physically resembling the author or reader of the work.

In visual art, the equivalent of self-insertion is the inserted self-portrait, where the artist includes a self-portrait in a painting of a narrative subject. This has been a common artistic device since at least the European Renaissance.

Among professional writers, the intentional, deliberate use of first-person and third-person self-insertion techniques are commonly considered to be an unoriginal action on the author's part, and represents a paucity of creative thought in their writing.

== Literary forms ==
Similar literary devices include the author doubling as the first-person narrator, or writing an author surrogate in the third-person, or adding in a character who is partially based on the author, whether the author included it intentionally or not. Many characters have been described as unintentional self-insertions, implying that their author is unconsciously using them as an author surrogate.

Self-insertion can also be employed in a second-person narrative, utilizing the imagination of the reader and their suspension of disbelief. The reader, referred to in the second person, is depicted as interacting with another character, with the intent to encourage the reader's immersion and psychological projection of themselves into the story, imagining that they, themselves, are performing the written story. While examples in published fiction of second-person self-insertion are rare, the use of such is common in fan fiction, in which the reader is paired with a fictional character, often in an intimate setting.

== Examples ==
- Money by Martin Amis
- The Razor's Edge by Somerset Maugham
- Slaughterhouse-Five by Kurt Vonnegut
- Breakfast of Champions by Kurt Vonnegut
- The French Lieutenant's Woman by John Fowles
- Stan Lee is depicted as himself in different Marvel comic books and movies
- Clive Cussler, author of Dirk Pitt novels, has inserted himself as a deus ex machina character in several of his books
- In Gargantua and Pantagruel by François Rabelais, Rabelais takes over the narration of the story and personally describes the enlarged tongue of one of the protagonists as if he was physically in the story
- William Blake depicts himself in Milton: A Poem in Two Books
- The Divine Comedy by Dante Alighieri features the poet Dante himself as a character, visiting Hell through Heaven, where he meets people he does not like being punished, and his friends and famous historical heroes having eternal rest
- In Don Quixote, by Miguel de Cervantes, the novel La Galatea by Cervantes himself is mentioned among the books in Don Quixote's library; then, one of the characters adds "that Cervantes has been for many years a great friend of mine"
- In the Rush Revere series of books, authored by Rush Limbaugh, Limbaugh uses himself as the narrator, who is exploring various American historical settings and concepts and explaining them to readers
- I Am the Messenger by Markus Zusak
- Andrew Hussie used himself to recap story beats of his webcomic, Homestuck
- JPod by Douglas Coupland is said to employ the author as a character
- A character in The Dark Tower VI: Song of Susannah, by Stephen King, is thought to be directly based on King himself
- Handbook for Mortals by Lani Sarem
- A Series of Unfortunate Events by Lemony Snicket
- The Map and the Territory by Michel Houellebecq
- John Barth in the Dunyazadiad segment of John Barth's novel Chimera.
- Louis, the caretaker in Wayside School, is based on author Louis Sachar
- Rudyard Kipling writes himself a cameo in The Man Who Would Be King

== See also ==
- Cameo appearance – Brief appearance in performing art
- Self-parody – Parody of oneself
- Self-portrait – Portrait of an artist made by that artist
- Self-reference – Sentence, idea or formula that refers to itself
- Author surrogate – Fictional character type
