= Clarksville High School (Clarksville, Texas) =

Coordinates: 33.6093°N 95.0576°W

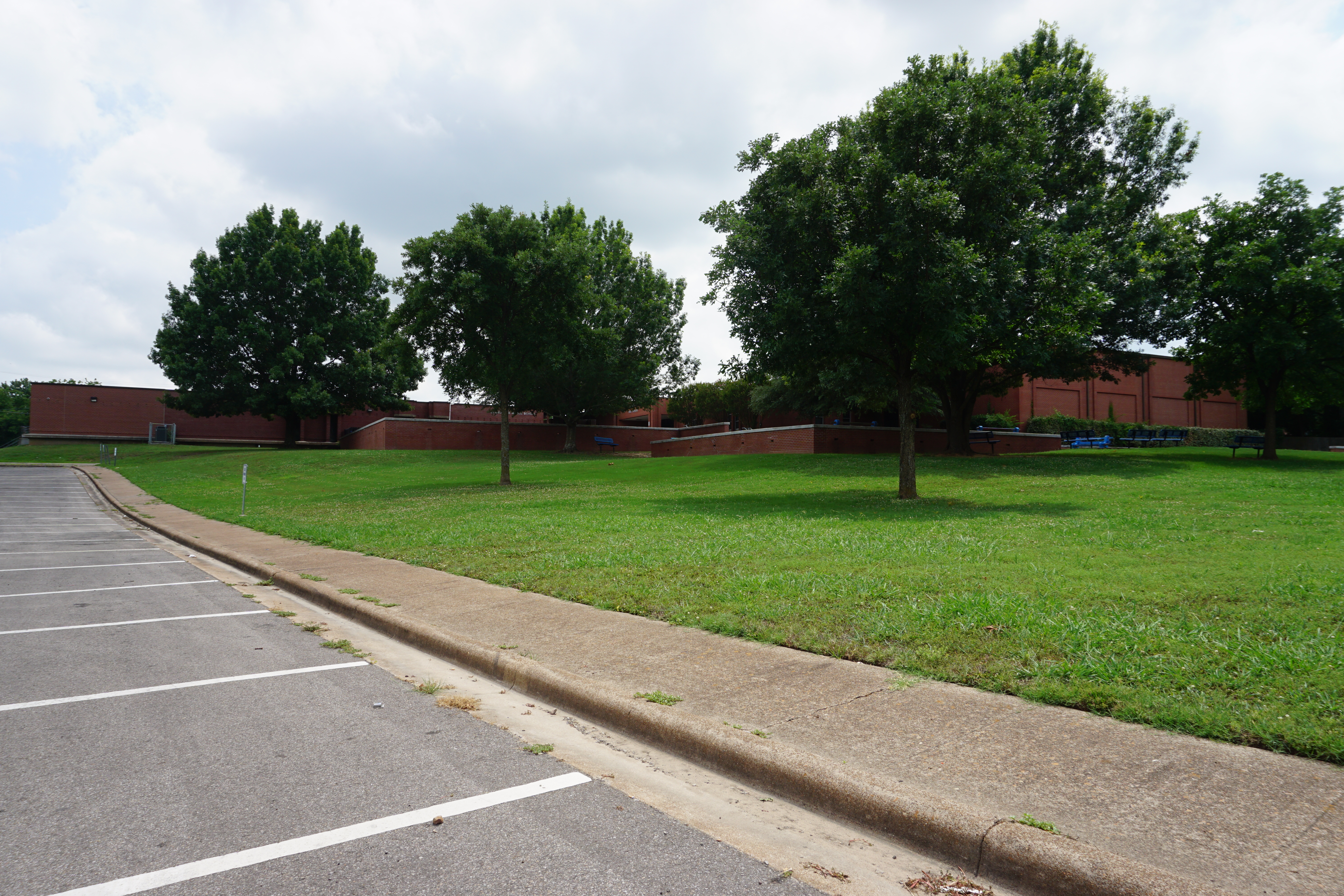
- Clarksville High School (right), alongside Clarksville Middle School

Location
- 201 S Donoho St; Clarksville, Texas 75426-1016; United States

Information
- School type: Public high school
- Motto: Be All YOU Can Be At CISD
- School district: Clarksville Independent School District
- Principal: Quincy English
- Teaching staff: 27.36 (FTE)
- Grades: 6-12
- Enrollment: 266 (2023–2024)
- Student to teacher ratio: 9.72
- Colors: Royal Blue & White
- Athletics conference: UIL Class 2A
- Mascot: Tiger
- Website: Clarksville High School

Clarksville High School is a public high school located in Clarksville, Texas, United States. It is part of the Clarksville Independent School District located in central Red River County and classified as a 2A school by the University Interscholastic League (UIL). In 2013, the school was rated "Met Standard" by the Texas Education Agency.

== Accountability rating ==
In past years, the campus had fallen victim to lower and lower test scores on the state-mandated TAKS Test. The District was determined to turn things around. After much hard work from educators and students, the Clarksville High School went from being an unacceptable campus to a "Recognized Campus" in 2009-2010.

== Activities ==
The Clarksville Tigers compete in the following activities:

Cross Country, Volleyball, Football, Basketball, Powerlifting, Track.

=== State titles ===
- Boys Basketball -
  - 1995(3A), 1998(3A), 2012(1A/D1)
- Marching Band -
  - 2017(2A)

==== State finalists ====
- Boys Basketball -
  - 1989(3A), 1991(3A)

== Notable alumni ==
- Gary VanDeaver (Class of 1976), former superintendent of the New Boston Independent School District and incoming 2015 Republican member of the Texas House of Representatives from Bowie, Franklin, Lamar, and Red River counties.
