= Clarksville Independent School District =

School district in Texas, United States

Clarksville Independent School District is a rural public school district in Red River County, Texas, United States, and serves all students in the town of Clarksville and small portions of nearby communities. About 690 students were enrolled for the fall 2011 semester.

In 2009, the school district was rated "academically acceptable" by the Texas Education Agency. In 2010, the high school and the district received a rating of "recognized" by the Texas Education Agency.

== Schools ==
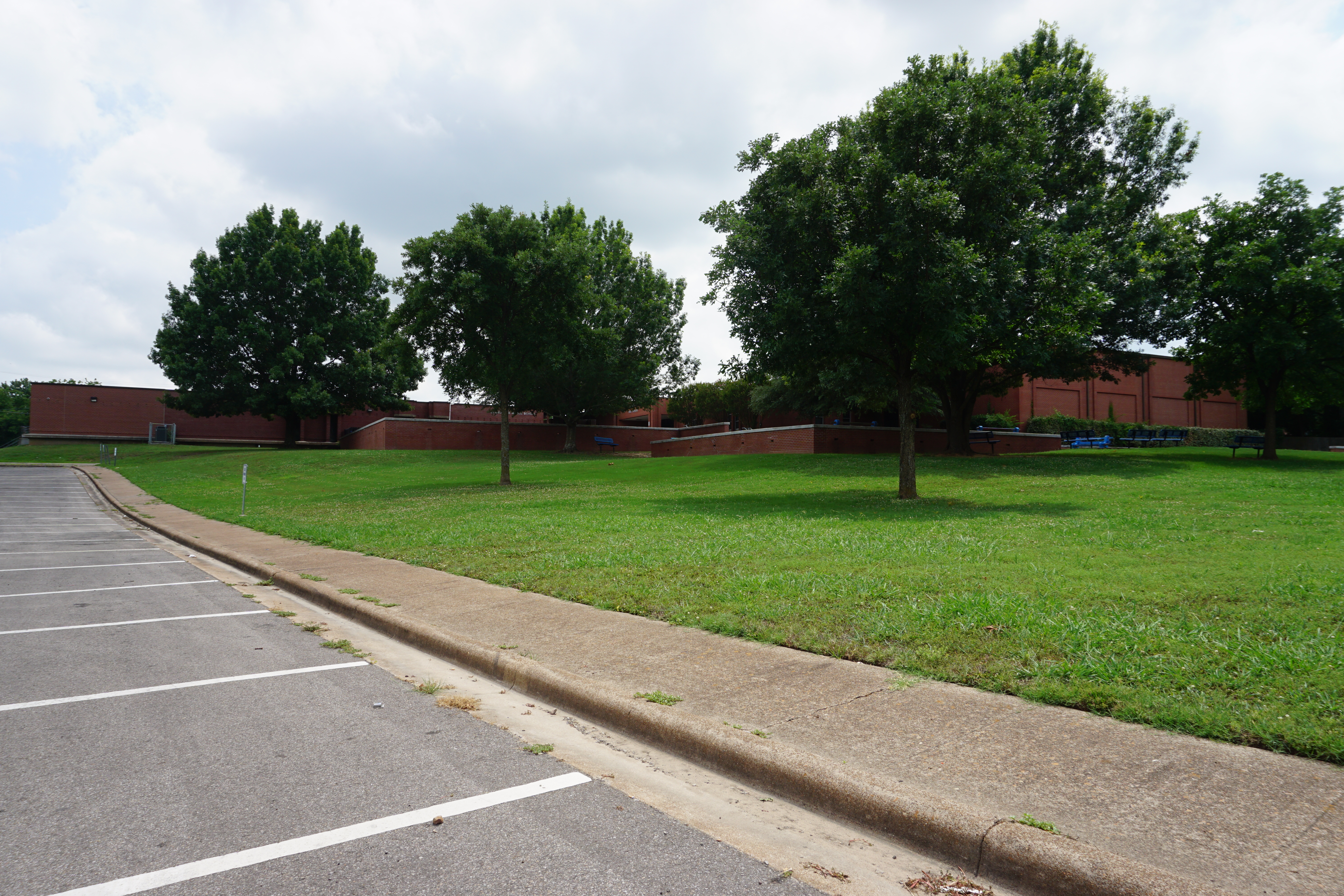
Clarksville Middle School (left) and Clarksville High School

Clarksville ISD operates three campuses, including Clarksville High School (grades 6-12), Cheatham Elementary School (kindergarten-grade 5), and the Vocational School/DAEP.

== 2026 Administration ==
Dr. Traci Robinson serves as superintendent of schools.
