= Warlock (1959 film) =

1959 film directed by Edward Dmytryk

- Theatrical poster
- Directed by: Edward Dmytryk
- Screenplay by: Robert Alan Aurthur
- Based on: Warlock by Oakley Hall
- Produced by: Edward Dmytryk
- Starring: Richard Widmark; Henry Fonda; Anthony Quinn; Dorothy Malone; Dolores Michaels
- Cinematography: Joseph MacDonald
- Edited by: Jack W. Holmes
- Music by: Leigh Harline
- Color process: Color by DeLuxe
- Production company: 20th Century Fox
- Distributed by: 20th Century Fox
- Release date: April 15, 1959
- Running time: 121 minutes
- Country: United States
- Language: English
- Budget: $2.4 million
- Box office: $1.7 million (est. US/ Canada rentals)

Warlock is a 1959 American Western film produced and directed by Edward Dmytryk starring Richard Widmark, Henry Fonda, Anthony Quinn and Dorothy Malone. The picture is an adaptation of the novel Warlock by American author Oakley Hall. The film is both set and filmed in Utah.

Fonda portrays Clay Blaisedell, a freelance marshal in the fictional town of Warlock with implacable methods of dealing with troublemakers, while Widmark portrays Johnny Gannon, a former outlaw who eventually becomes the town's deputy sheriff. A subplot centers on Blaisedell's club-footed assistant, Tom Morgan, played by Quinn, who has sublimated his relationships and ambition into a warped devotion to Blaisedell, the only person Morgan thinks does not look down on him for his disability.

As in the earlier film Wichita (1955), the conflict of the law with the outlaw runs parallel to the resentment of the town's own leadership.

Warlock was released on home video in various formats, including VHS and DVD; the most recent DVD version was issued in 2005. In 2019 Twilight Time issued a limited edition of the film on Blu-ray disc. The release, limited to 3,000 copies, features a new high-definition transfer of the film, and includes the original trailer and an isolated film score.

== Plot ==
Warlock is a small Utah mining town of the early 1880s. Cowboys working for Abe McQuown often come into town, killing on a whim, and beating, humiliating and running out of town any deputy sheriff who tries to stand up to them. The Citizens' Committee decides to hire Clay Blaisedell, a renowned gunfighter, as town marshal in spite of the misgivings of some, such as old Judge Holloway. The town is not incorporated and does not have authority to have its own marshal.

Blaisedell arrives with his devoted clubfoot friend, Tom Morgan, an expert gunman as well. Morgan has a reputation as a heavy-drinking gambler, but Blaisedell insists that he is part of the package. Morgan becomes the manager of the town's saloon.

Their first encounter with McQuown's men is without bloodshed. The cowboys are intimidated by Blaisedell, and one, Johnny Gannon, stays behind, because he has become sick of their murderous ways.

Morgan learns that his old flame, Lily Dollar, is coming to town on the stagecoach, accompanied by Bob Nicholson, brother of Big Ben Nicholson, who was recently killed by Blaisedell. Lily had left Morgan for Big Ben and knows that Morgan pushed Ben into challenging Blaisedell, who killed him. She wants Blaisedell dead to punish Morgan.

Morgan sets out to meet the stagecoach, but sees from a distance it being robbed by some of McQuown's men. He takes advantage of the situation to kill Bob Nicholson unseen. Lily arrives in town and sees Morgan there. She correctly guesses that he pulled the trigger.

The robbers are arrested without incident by Blaisedell and a posse. Before taking them to Bright City for trial, the sheriff, who disapproves of Blaisedell, accepts Gannon's offer to become Warlock's new resident deputy.

The robbers, one of whom is Gannon's younger brother Billy, are cleared by a jury intimidated by McQuown. The cowboys, led by Billy, immediately confront Blaisedell and Morgan in the street. Deputy Gannon asks them to leave and tells Billy, "I ain't backin' him, because you're my brother, and I ain't backin' you, because you're wrong." A cowboy tries to shoot Blaisedell in the back, but is spotted by Morgan and shot. Blaisedell kills two others, including Billy, after giving him a chance to back down. McQuown's smooth-talking man Curley posts wanted notices for Blaisedell, declaring the cowboys "regulators" in mockery of his quasi-legal status. Gannon vows to stop any regulators who come into town, and McQuown angrily stabs him in his gun hand.

Townspeople begin resenting Blaisedell and Morgan, exactly as Blaisedell had predicted. However, he has started a relationship with Jessie Marlow and decides to marry and settle down, much to the surprise of Morgan, who wants to move on.

Despite his injured hand, Gannon faces the cowboys alone after Morgan pulls a gun on Blaisedell, who had volunteered to back the deputy. With help from the citizens and from Curley, who promised him "a fair fight", Gannon unexpectedly kills McQuown and breaks up the regulators for good. Morgan cannot tolerate the idea that Gannon is now more of a hero than Blaisedell, and he resents Lily's attraction to the deputy, too. In the course of an argument, Blaisedell learns the truth about the deaths of the Nicholson brothers and turns his back on Morgan.

That evening, in a drunken state, Morgan calls Gannon out, intending to kill him. Blaisedell locks Deputy Gannon in his own cell, insisting, "Tom Morgan's my responsibility." Initially content to seem cowed, Morgan is pleased Blaisedell is a hero again, but when townspeople jeer and mock Morgan as he walks away, he challenges Blaisedell to a showdown. Morgan shoots off Blaisedell's hat before being fatally wounded a split-second later. Morgan's dying words are, "I won, Clay, I won!"

A grief-stricken Blaisedell carries his friend's body into the saloon, which he burns down. Gannon tells Blaisedell that he will arrest him in the morning if he does not leave town. Blaisedell decides to leave. Jessie refuses to accompany him. The next day, Gannon and Blaisedell face one another. Blaisedell outdraws Gannon, but then throws his famous golden-handled revolvers into the sand, smiles at Gannon and rides off.

== Cast ==
- Richard Widmark as Johnny Gannon
- Henry Fonda as Clay Blaisedell
- Anthony Quinn as Tom Morgan
- Dorothy Malone as Lily Dollar
- Dolores Michaels as Jessie Marlow
- Wallace Ford as Judge Holloway
- Tom Drake as Abe McQuown
- Richard Arlen as Bacon
- DeForest Kelley as "Curley" Burne
- Regis Toomey as Skinner
- Vaughn Taylor as Henry Richardson
- Don Beddoe as Dr. Wagner
- Whit Bissell as Petrix
- Bartlett Robinson as Buck Slavin
- Frank Gorshin as Billy Gannon
- Don "Red" Barry as Calhoun
- Walter Coy as Deputy Thomson
- June Blair as Dance Hall Girl
- L. Q. Jones as Fen Jiggs (uncredited)
- Mickey Simpson as Fitzsimmons (uncredited)
- Robert Osterloh as Professor (uncredited)
- James Philbrook as Cade (uncredited)
- Joel Ashley as Murch (uncredited)
- Gary Lockwood as Gang Member (uncredited)
- Wally Campo as Barber (uncredited)

== Production ==
Released by Twentieth Century Fox and shot in DeLuxe Color and CinemaScope, the film was adapted from Hall's novel for the screen by Robert Alan Aurthur. Parts of the film were shot at Utah locations, including Dead Horse Point State Park, Arches National Park, Kings Bottom, Professor Valley, Sand Flats, and White's Ranch in Moab (which was also a set for a number of other Westerns from the same era).

== Reception ==
In The New York Times, Bosley Crowther wrote:

Hand it to Mr. Aurthur and to Mr. Dmytryk, who also produced. They have put the whole picture together in a straight, precise layout of plots and accumulating action that hold interest up to the big scenes. Then when the shooting commences and climax follows climax—bang, bang, bang!—and strong men fight with their emotions, it is good, solid, gripping Western fare.

Mr. Fonda, as usual, is excellent—melancholy, laconic and assured—and Mr. Widmark is properly nervous but full of sincerity and spunk. Mr. Quinn lays it on a little heavy in a slightly pathetic role, but he adds his measure of drama to the final rock-bottom goings-on. As a couple of complicating females, Dolores Michaels and Dorothy Malone provide the beauty and vexation that are essential to deep Western films. And a whole mob of performers do capital jobs in lesser roles—Tom Drake, Wallace Ford, Richard Arlen, DeForest Kelley and many more. Warlock is colorful and noisy. It should drag those Western fans out of their homes.

Later critics have referenced the homoerotic nature of the relationship between Quinn and Fonda; the film's entry in The Aurum Film Encyclopedia describing it as "perhaps the most open depiction of homosexual love in the classic Western". (Note: Anthony Quinn’s obituary in The Daily Telegraph called Morgan, “a crippled homosexual, somewhat nebulously in love with Henry Fonda”.)
