= Stoner (novel) =

1965 novel by John Williams

- First edition
- Author: John Williams
- Cover artist: Ellen Raskin
- Language: English
- Genre: Campus novel
- Set in: Columbia, Missouri
- Publisher: The Viking Press
- Publication date: April 23, 1965
- Publication place: United States
- Media type: Print (hardcover)
- Pages: 278
- OCLC: 647139
- Dewey Decimal: 813/.54
- LC Class: PZ3.W6744 St PS3545.I5286

Stoner is a 1965 novel by the American writer John Williams. Published on April 23, 1965 by Viking Press, the novel received little attention on first release, but saw a surge of popularity and critical praise since its republication in the 2000s. It has been championed by authors such as Julian Barnes, Ian McEwan, Bret Easton Ellis, and John McGahern.

Stoner has been categorized as an academic novel, or campus novel. Stoner follows the life of the eponymous William Stoner, his career and workplace politics, marriage to his wife Edith, affair with his colleague Katherine, and his love and pursuit of literature.

== Plot ==
William Stoner is born on a small farm in 1891. One day his father suggests he should attend the University of Missouri to study agriculture. Stoner agrees, but following an encounter with Shakespeare's Sonnet 73 in Archer Sloane's English course, falls in love with literature. Without telling his parents, Stoner quits the agriculture program and studies the humanities. He completes his MA in English and begins teaching. In graduate school, he befriends fellow students Gordon Finch and Dave Masters. World War I begins, and Finch and Masters enlist, but despite Finch urging him to join the war, Stoner remains in school after a talk with Sloane. Masters is killed in France, while Finch sees action and becomes an officer. At a faculty party, Stoner meets and becomes infatuated with a young woman named Edith. He proposes marriage to her and she cancels a trip to Europe so they can marry.

Hostility develops between them. Edith is uninterested in intimacy and repulsed by sex. But after three years of marriage, Edith suddenly informs Stoner that she wants a baby, becomes passionately sexual for a brief period, but after their daughter Grace is born, she remains bedridden for nearly a year. Stoner largely cares for their child alone. He grows close to her and she spends most of her time with him in his study. Stoner gradually realizes that Edith is waging a campaign to separate him from his daughter emotionally. For the most part, Stoner accepts Edith's mistreatment. He begins to teach with more enthusiasm, but still, year in and year out, his marriage with Edith remains perpetually unsatisfactory. Grace becomes an unhappy, secretive child who smiles and laughs often but is emotionally hollow.

At the university, Finch becomes the acting dean. Stoner feels compelled by his conscience to fail a student named Charles Walker, a close protégé of a colleague, Professor Hollis Lomax. The student is clearly dishonest and cannot fulfill the requirements of Stoner's course but, despite this, the decision to expel or retain Walker is put on hold as the disciplinary committee cannot come to a unanimous decision. After his promotion to head of the department, Lomax takes every opportunity to exact revenge upon Stoner throughout the rest of his career, such as giving Stoner uninteresting and grueling teaching schedules.

Soon after, a collaboration between Stoner and a younger instructor in the department, Katherine Driscoll, develops into a romantic love affair. Ironically, after the affair begins, Stoner's relationships with Edith and Grace also improve. Edith finds out about the affair, but does not seem to mind. When Lomax learns about it, however, he extends his revenge on Stoner by destroying their relationship by pressuring Katherine with exposure of her supposed indecency. Stoner and Driscoll decide it best to end their relationship, as fighting for their romance would necessarily derail the academic work for which they both feel a deep calling. Katherine quietly slips out of town, never to be seen by him again.

Stoner, older now and hard of hearing, has become a legendary figure in the English department despite Lomax's opposition. He begins to spend more time at home, ignoring Edith's displeasure at his presence. Grace enters adulthood and enrolls at the University of Missouri, but returns the following year to announce that she is pregnant. She marries the father of her child—but he enlists in the army and dies on the Pacific Front of WWII before the baby is born. Grace moves to St. Louis with the baby to live with her deceased husband's parents. She visits Stoner and Edith occasionally, and Stoner realizes that Grace has developed a drinking problem. Around this time, Stoner discovers that Katherine has published a book, and after obtaining a copy, discovers it is dedicated to him.

Stoner learns that he has cancer of the intestine and reverses his earlier resolve to postpone retirement. Grace comes to visit Stoner from St. Louis. Deeply unhappy and addicted to alcohol, Grace halfheartedly tries to reconcile with Stoner, and he sees that his daughter, like her mother, will never be happy. When Grace leaves, Stoner feels as though the young child that he loved died long ago. Stoner's health declines and he contemplates life through a haze of painkillers. Between repetitions of the thought "What did you expect?" Stoner thinks back over his life. He thinks about where he failed, and wonders if he could have been more loving to Edith, if he could have been stronger, or if he could have helped her more. Finally, he believes that he is wrong to think of himself as a failure. During an afternoon when he is alone, he sees various young students passing by on their way to class outside his window. He dies, dropping his copy of the only book he published when he was a young professor.

== Characters ==
The novel focuses on William Stoner and the central figures in his life. Those who become his enemies are used as tools against him who separate Stoner from his loves. New Yorker contributor Tim Kreider describes their depictions as "evil marked with deformity."

- William Stoner: The novel's main character is a farm boy turned English professor. He uses his love of literature to deal with his unfulfilling personal life.
- Edith Bostwick Stoner: Stoner's wife, a neurotic woman, is from a strict and sheltered upbringing. Stoner falls in love upon first meeting her, but soon realizes that she is bitter and has been so long before they were married.
- Grace Stoner: Stoner and Edith's only child. Throughout the course of the novel, Edith exerts considerable control over the minutiae of Grace's life, often as a pseudo-punishment for Stoner.
- Gordon Finch: Stoner's colleague and only real ally and friend. He has known Stoner since their graduate school days and becomes the dean of the college of Arts and Sciences. His affable and outgoing demeanor contrasts with that of Stoner. He achieves the rank of captain during World War I and introduces Stoner to Edith at the university's reception honoring returning veterans.
- David Masters: Stoner and Finch's friend from graduate school. He is killed in action during World War I, but he retains a presence in Stoner's mind throughout the rest of his life.
- Archer Sloane: Stoner's teacher and mentor during his time at the university as a student. He inspires Stoner to leave agriculture behind and begin studying English literature. He is old and ailing by the time Stoner is hired at the university.
- Hollis Lomax: Sloane's replacement at the university who eventually sees Stoner as his enemy. Stoner and Lomax do not see eye-to-eye in their work life and do not speak to each other following Walker's disciplinary action.
- Charles Walker: Lomax's crippled mentee, he is an arrogant and duplicitous young man who uses rhetorical flourish to mask his scholarly ineptitude.
- Katherine Driscoll: A younger graduate student at the university. She has an affair with Stoner. University politics and circumstance prevent them from continuing the relationship.

== Themes ==
In the NYRB Classics edition's introduction, John McGahern says Stoner is a "novel about work." This includes not only traditional work, such as Stoner's life on the farm and his career as a professor, but also the work one puts into life and relationships.

One of the central themes in the novel is the manifestation of passion. Stoner's passions manifest themselves into failures, as proven by the bleak end of his life. Stoner has two primary passions: knowledge and love. According to Morris Dickstein, "he fails at both." Love is also a widely recognized theme in Stoner. The novel's representation of love moves beyond romance; it highlights the bliss and suffering that can be qualities of love. Both Stoner and Lomax discovered a love of literature early in their lives, and it is this love that ultimately endures throughout Stoner's life. Another of the novel's central themes is the social reawakening, which is closely linked to the sexual reawakening, of the protagonist. After a disagreement with Walker, a prospective graduate student, and his thesis adviser, Lomax, Stoner seeks fulfillment in his affair with Katherine Driscoll.

Edwin Frank, the editor at NYRB Classics responsible for the 2005 reissue of the novel, suggests that Stoner contains many existential elements. "I don't think it's a mistake to hear Camus behind it," Frank suggests, "this story of a lone man against the world choosing his life, such as it is. I sometimes say the book[']s a bit like an Edward Hopper painting, wooden houses casting stark shadows on blank green lawns."

== Style ==
John McGahern's Introduction to Stoner and Adam Foulds of The Independent praise Williams' prose for its cold, factual plainness. Foulds claims that Stoner has a "flawless narrative rhythm [that] flows like a river." Williams' prose has also been applauded for its clarity, by both McGahern and Charlotte Heathcote of The Daily Express. In an interview with the BBC, author Ian McEwan calls Williams' prose "authoritative". Sarah Hampson of The Globe and Mail writes that Williams' "description of petty academic politics reads like the work of someone taking surreptitious notes at dreary faculty meetings." Her review also found Stoner "quietly beautiful and moving" and "precisely constructed." Another review found that "Williams's gift for emotional precision" ... "elevates one man's story ... into something universal."

== Background ==
John Williams's life was similar to that of his character in Stoner. He was an English professor at the University of Denver until he retired in 1985. Like Stoner, he experienced coworker frustrations in the academic world and was devoted to this work, making his novel a reflection of parts of his own life, though in the preface to the novel Williams states that it is entirely "a work of fiction" and bears no resemblance to any people or events he experienced in his time at the University of Missouri.

The life of academic poet J. V. Cunningham also seems to have partially inspired the novel.

== Reception ==
In 1963 Williams's own publisher questioned Stoner's potential to gain popularity and become a bestseller. On its 1965 publication there were a handful of glowing reviews such as The New Yorker's of June 12, 1965, which praised Williams for creating a character who is dedicated to his work but cheated by the world. Those who gave positive feedback pointed to the truthful voice with which Williams wrote about life's conditions, and they often compared Stoner to his other work, Augustus, in characters and plot direction. Irving Howe and C. P. Snow also praised the novel. Sales of fewer than 2,000 copies did not reflect these positive commentaries: it was out of print a year later.

It was then reissued as a mass-market paperback in 1972 by Pocket Books, reissued again in 1998 by the University of Arkansas Press and then in 2003 in paperback by Vintage and 2006 by New York Review Books Classics. After French novelist Anna Gavalda translated Stoner in 2011 and in 2013, sales to distributors tripled. It was not until several years later during Stoner's republication that the book became better known. After being republished and translated into several languages, the novel "sold hundreds of thousands of copies in 21 countries".

Williams's novel has been praised for both its narrative and stylistic aspects. In a 2007 review of the recently reissued work, scholar and book critic Morris Dickstein acclaims the writing technique as remarkable and says the novel "takes your breath away". Bryan Appleyard's review quotes critic D. G. Myers as saying that the novel was a good book for beginners in the world of "serious literature". Another critic, author Alex Preston, writes that the novel describes "a small life ... in a small, precise way: the dead hand of realism." In 2010, critic Mel Livatino noted that, in "nearly fifty years of reading fiction, I have never encountered a more powerful novel—and not a syllable of it sentimental." Steve Almond reviewed Stoner in The New York Times Magazine in 2014. Almond claims Stoner focuses on the "capacity to face the truth of who we are in private moments" and questions whether any of us is truly able to say we are able to do that. Almond states, "I devoured it in one sitting. I had never encountered a work so ruthless in its devotion to human truths and so tender in its execution." Sarah Hampson of The Globe and Mail sees Stoner as an "antidote" to a 21st-century culture of entitlement. She says that the novel came back to public attention at a time when people felt entitled to personal fulfillment, at the cost of their own morality, and Stoner shows that there can be value even in a life that seems failed. In 2013, it was named Waterstones Book of the Year and The New Yorker called it "the greatest American novel you've never heard of." Writing in The Washington Post in 2015, literary critic Elaine Showalter was less enthusiastic, noting that she, "along with other female readers, [was] put off by Williams's misogyny" and found fault with Williams's portrayal of Stoner as "a blameless martyr, rather than a man with choices."

== Adaptations ==
In 2015, a film adaptation of the novel was reportedly in production by Blumhouse Productions, Cohen Media Group and Film4. Casey Affleck was set to star as Stoner. As of November 2025, the film had still not entered production.
