= Chimera (Barth novel) =

1972 novel by John Barth

- First edition dustcover
- Author: John Barth
- Language: English
- Genre: Fantasy
- Publisher: Random House
- Publication date: November 1, 1972
- Publication place: United States
- Media type: Print (hardcover and paperback), e-book
- Pages: 308
- ISBN: 978-0-394-48189-0
- OCLC: 411898
- LC Class: PZ4.B284 Ch PS3552.A75

Chimera is a 1972 fantasy novel written by American writer John Barth, composed of three loosely connected novellas. The novellas are Dunyazadiad, Perseid and Bellerophoniad, whose titles refer eponymously to the mythical characters Dunyazad, Perseus and Bellerophon (slayer of the mythical Chimera). The book is an example of postmodernism, which can be seen in its metafictional content and its incorporation of stylistic elements that go beyond the traditional novel genre. It shared the U.S. National Book Award for Fiction with Augustus by John Edward Williams.

== Plots ==
=== Dunyazadiad ===
The Dunyazadiad is a retelling of the framing story of Scheherazade, the famed storyteller of the One Thousand and One Nights. The story is told from the point of view of Scheherazade's younger sister Dunyazade. Its characterization as metafiction can be understood as a result of the use of several literary devices, most notably the introduction of the author as a character and his interaction with Scheherazade and Dunyazade. The author appears from the future and expresses his admiration for Scheherazade and the 1001 Nights as a work of fiction, of which Barth's Scheherazade has no knowledge. Realizing that he has appeared to Scheherazade on the eve of her first encounter with the monarch Shahryar, and seeing her without a solution to her predicament, the author himself suggests the stratagem of using a chain of interrupted stories to forestall her execution, and offers to tell her a new story every day with which to regale the king the following evening. Taking the author for a genie, Scheherazade agrees.

=== Perseid ===
The second novella entitled Perseid follows the middle aged Greek hero Perseus in his struggle to obtain immortality. Told from Perseus' point of view, the first part of the story revolves around the retelling of Perseus' life history, while the following part details his rise to, and eventual immortalization as a constellation of stars.

=== Bellerophoniad ===
The final novella, Bellerophoniad, chronicles the story of Bellerophon, yet another ancient Greek hero. While somewhat rooted in the myth as told by the Greek and Roman poets, Barth's version of the story is not a direct retelling, but instead a re-imagining. Much like the Perseid, the Bellerophoniad surrounds a middle aged mythic hero who struggles with coming to terms with his past accomplishments and a desire to secure his future glory. It is, for the most part, told from the point of view of Bellerophon, with various interjections by unknown narrators, one of which is presumed to be the author Barth. Of the three novellas, it is by far the longest and—more so than in Dunyazadiad and Perseid—makes numerous references to the other novellas, further connecting common themes and events between the three.

== Central characters ==
Dunyazadiad

Scheherazade: Also referred to as "Sherry," she is the key storyteller from One Thousand and One Nights and much of this novella's plot revolves around her and her power of crafting stories. She is nevertheless not the principal narrator of the Dunyazadiad.

Dunyazad: Also referred to as "Doony," Dunyazad is the sister of Scheherazade and being held captive by the King. Doony narrates the first and longest of the three chapters in the novella.

Shahryar and Shah Zaman: The King and his brother. Both men were cuckolded by their wives, so together they devise a revenge plan whereby they each deflower and then kill a new woman from their kingdom each night, initializing the conflict of the story.

The Genie: Actually a writer - likely a representation of Barth - who magically transports through time and space from 20th century America to Sherry and Doony's room. Scheherazade is his favorite author/narrator and he falls intellectually in love with her. With the help of the Genie, Sherry and Doony devise the plan to tell the King stories every night to forestall sex and execution. This plan involves the Genie reading a section of One Thousand and One Nights every day and then reporting back to Sherry, complicating notions of authorship.

Perseid

Perseus: The hero of Greek mythology who beheaded the Gorgon Medusa. He narrates his own life story to Calyxa with the aid of elaborate temple murals, paying particular attention to his life after most of his great deeds are over. In the novella, he suffers through a midlife crisis and struggles to understand his relevance now that he is no longer a heroic young man. He repeatedly struggles with impotence through his story.

Andromeda: Perseus's wife who's grown dissatisfied with marriage and Perseus's obsession with his past triumphs.

Calyxa: A nymph and priestess charged with the task of caring for certain gods' and heroes' temples, including Perseus's. A very devoted individual, Calyxa appears obsessed with Perseus's stories and craves his sexual attention, despite his impotence.

Medusa: Beheading Medusa had been Perseus's major heroic accomplishment, but now the figure troubles Perseus because of his lost glory and issues of guilt.

Bellerophoniad

Bellerophon: The Greek mythic hero who first tamed Pegasus and slayed the Chimera, becoming the King of Lycia. Also called "Bell," he's Perseus's younger cousin and he constantly compares himself self-consciously to the older hero.

The Narrator: Somewhat a version of Bellerophon, he was "transformed by the seer Polyeidus into a version of Bellerophon's life" in order to tell this story (138). He constantly questions his own adequacy for the task, and his narrative doubts perpetually intrude in the story.

Philonoe: Bellerophon's wife. She loves Bellerophon and is comfortable in her life, but she sees every delight in life as a "net loss" (148)

Melanippe: An Amazonian woman that Bellerophon has as a "lover and alleged chronicler" in the second half of his life (146). Intrudes on narration periodically.

Polyeidus: He tutors Bellerophon and his twin, Deliades, when they were children, and he is the marsh seer who turns Bellerophon into the narrator of the "Bellerophoniad." Polyeidus has trouble controlling his magical abilities and prophesying. Intrudes on narration periodically.

== Style and structure ==
Chimera is written in three loosely related sections, or novellas, similar to the way the mythical Chimera is a hybrid creature composed of three animals (typically some combination of a lion, a goat, and a snake).

There are a number of Q&A sessions and diagrams, all occurring in Bellerophoniad: a classification of human actions (175), a genealogical chart of demigods (182), a geometric "schema" for the course of dramatic action (251), and a cyclic depiction of the heroic journey (261).
