= Nothing but the Night (novel) =

1948 novel by the American writer John Williams

- Author: John Williams
- Language: English
- Genre: Psychological fiction
- Publisher: Swallow Press
- Publication date: 1948
- Publication place: United States
- Media type: Print (paperback)
- Pages: 127
- OCLC: 3225902
- Dewey Decimal: 813/.54
- LC Class: PS3545.I5286 N68 2019

Nothing but the Night is a 1948 novel written by American writer John Williams, which was originally published by Swallow Press and later reissued by New York Review Books Classics. Nothing but the Night was his debut. The novel follows Arthur Maxley, a psychologically disturbed loner and college dropout, as he attempts to make amends with his estranged father.

== Plot ==
The novel is set in an unspecified city, likely somewhere in the United States, and summarizes the events of a single day. It opens with a dream had by the novel's protagonist, Arthur Maxley, in which he feels weightless and unalive. Maxley lives alone in his apartment and survives off an allowance from his parents. After acclimating himself to his surroundings, he discovers that he is at a party and, furthermore, in the company of his friend Max Evart. What follows is a set of surreal encounters and hallucinations had by Maxley for the remainder of the story, who perceives eyes in a fried egg he has for breakfast and the face of his mother in a night club performer. He seemingly has trouble with daily functioning, and can't bring himself to perform basic tasks in spite of his own best interests. Maxley spends much of the novel drinking, and it becomes increasingly evident that he is suffering from symptoms of post-traumatic stress due in part to unspecified childhood trauma.

== Background ==
Nothing but the Night was made during a particularly tumultuous period in Williams' life: it was partially written during his enlistment in the United States military, in a tent outside of Calcutta, India, and only soon after being relieved from duty during World War II. Despite being injured in a plane crash over the Himalayas, Williams wasn't able to return to the United States until the end of the war and only pursued the novel out of boredom; however, American biographer Charles J. Shields has questioned the veracity of Williams' claims, citing inconsistencies between his account and flight logs. While composing the rest of the work, Williams' first marriage was failing and his mother fell into poor health. He briefly moved to California, where he acquainted himself with American professor Alan Swallow, who published the novel and hired Williams as an associate editor. Williams later distanced himself from the project.
