= Augustus (Williams novel) =

1972 novel by John Edward Williams

- First edition
- Author: John Williams
- Language: English
- Publisher: Viking Press
- Publication date: 1972
- Publication place: United States
- Media type: Print
- Pages: 305
- ISBN: 0-670-14112-7
- OCLC: 513805
- Dewey Decimal: 813/.5/4
- LC Class: PZ3.W6744 Au PS3545.I5286

Augustus is an epistolary, historical fiction by John Williams published by Viking Press in 1972. It tells the story of Augustus, emperor of Rome, from his youth through old age. The book is divided into two parts, the beginning chronicling his rise to power, the latter describing his rule thereafter, and the familial problems faced choosing a successor. Williams and Augustus shared the 1973 U.S. National Book Award for Fiction with John Barth and Chimera, the first time the award was split, and the only one of Williams's four novels to receive significant acclaim within his lifetime.

After falling out of print the novel was re-issued in 2014 by NYRB Classics as part of their revival of Williams’s work.

== Plot ==
Told through various letters and fragments, Augustus begins when Gaius Octavius Thurinus is 17 and is called away from his mother by his great-uncle, Julius Caesar, who reveals he intends to groom the boy to be his successor. Gaius Octavius spends a few years with three young men around his own age, Gaius Cilnius Maecenas, Marcus Vipsanius Agrippa, and Quintus Salvidienus Rufus. When he is 19, Gaius Octavius receives a letter from his mother informing him that Caesar has been murdered and urging him to renounce the will which will name him as Caesar's adopted son. Ignoring her counsel, the four young men make a pact to protect Gaius Octavius and avenge Caesar. They go to Rome unarmed and are thus assumed not to be a threat by Caesar's assassins. The friends are particularly suspicious of Mark Antony, a friend of Caesar's whom they view as disloyal.

In order to gain the backing of the Senate to legitimize him as a Caesar, Octavius (now using the name Caesar) corrals an army to protect Decimus Carfulenus and attack Antony's army. After Octavius Caesar is successful, the senate reneges on their promise. Octavius Caesar then arranges a secret meeting with Antony in order to consolidate their power, joining with Marcus Aemilius Lepidus to anoint themselves "Triumvirs". During the negotiations, Octavius Caesar learns that Quintus Salvidienus Rufus, who he left in charge of his armies, betrayed him to Antony. Octavius Caesar strips him of his powers and Quintus commits suicide out of shame.

After the assassinations of the Triumvirs senatorial enemies, Rome is brought to an uneasy peace though Octavius Caesar and Antony continue to regard each other with deep suspicion. To confirm their uneasy alliance Antony marries Octavius Caesar's sister, Octavia the Younger; however his interests lie in Egypt with Cleopatra and in the unsuccessful attempts to conquer new territory. As tensions increase, Antony seeks to engage Octavius Caesar in civil war, however he loses the Battle of Actium and commits suicide shortly thereafter. Octavius Caesar has both Caesarion (Caesar's son with Cleopatra) and Marcus Antonius Antyllus (Mark Antony's son and official heir), both only 17, assassinated. At the age of 33, Octavius Caesar has now consolidated power. He is given the title Augustus.

Now comfortably in power, Octavius Caesar spends most of his time defending the borders of his empire. He enjoys a happy marriage with his third wife, Livia, and leaves her in charge of rearing his only biological daughter, Julia. Unlike other women of her era, Octavius Caesar insists on giving his daughter an education closer to that of a male child. When Julia is only 14, Octavius Caesar becomes severely ill. Fearing death, and desperate to protect the line of succession he marries Julia to her cousin, and his niece to Marcus Vipsanius Agrippa. Octavius Caesar manages to survive the sickness but it in turn kills Julia's husband. Once again seeking to protect his plans of succession he has his niece divorce Agrippa and the now widowed Julia marry him. The political maneuverings put Octavius Caesar at odds with his sister, Octavia, and his wife, Livia, who had hoped that Julia would marry her son from her first marriage, Tiberius. As their marriage breaks down, Octavius takes his friend Maecenas's wife as a mistress.

In the meantime, Julia bears her husband a son and heir. At the age of 21 she begins to realize the great power she has as the daughter of an emperor and mother of a presumed emperor. She joins her father and husband on a tour of their territories but is called back by her father in shame when it becomes known that she has been named a goddess and engaged in strange sexual rituals on the island of Lesbos. In her late 30s, Julia begins an affair with her cousin's husband, Iullus Antonius, the son of Mark Antony. Her husband and father tolerate the affair, however it is discovered by Octavius Caesar that Iullus, along with several of Julia's former lovers, had been plotting to kill him and her husband Tiberius, and that Tiberius is well aware of the plot and plans to publicize it in order to seize power. To protect Julia, Octavius Caesar himself decides to have Julia prosecuted under adultery laws which leads to her exile to the island of Pandateria. Despite disliking Tiberius, he confirms him as his heir and finally adopts him.

In a long letter to his old friend Nicolaus of Damascus, Octavius reflects on his life and his failures, surprised that despite working to bring peace to the people of Rome, they seem to long for violence and instability.

50 years later, Octavius' final physician Philippus reflects on what little he knew of the man and hopes that the newly named emperor Nero will once again bring stability to Rome.

== Major themes ==
The major theme Augustus addresses is the ability of circumstances to change the personality and behavior of a person. The conditions that surrounded Augustus's rise to power plagued Ancient Rome with violence and contention, which led to Augustus working hard to implement a time of peace and cooperation in Rome, commonly referred to as the Pax Romana or the Pax Augusta. Other themes Williams writes on in his novel include coming of age and the difference between restraint and resignation.

== Background ==
Augustus is the last work Williams published before his death in 1994. Though Augustus garnered little public recognition while Williams was alive, the critical reception of the work was generally positive. It is unique as it is his first novel to take place outside of the United States.

== Critical reception ==
Augustus was received positively from critics across the country. Augustus garnered so much critical respect that it won the National Book Award in 1973. Williams and Augustus shared the 1973 U.S. National Book Award for Fiction with John Barth and Chimera, the first time the award was split. Critics such as Harold Augenbraum discuss the split award in their work, saying that this was the first time the fiction award was split and also discussing that the 1973 National Book Awards allowed many categories to split the awards.

Both the Los Angeles Review of Books and the New York Review of Books offered positive criticism, particularly about the fusion of biography and fiction. Reviewer Daniel Mendelsohn of the New York Review of Books wrote that "the life of the first emperor is an ideal vehicle for a historical novel: Augustus is a figure about whom we know at once a great deal and very little, and hence invites both description and invention".

Critics overwhelmingly praised the narrative of Augustus while critiquing the lack of speaking time Williams gives the title character. Overall, most critics praised Williams for forgoing his own personal voice to relay characters that are historical with personalities Williams imagines for himself and his audience.
