= John Edward Williams =

American writer (1922–1994)

John Williams
- Born: August 29, 1922; Clarksville, Texas, US
- Died: March 3, 1994 (aged 71); Fayetteville, Arkansas
- Occupations: Author; editor; professor
- Writing career
- Genre: Novel
- Notable works: Butcher's Crossing (1960); Stoner (1965); Augustus (1972)
- Notable awards: National Book Award; 1973 Augustus

John Edward Williams (August 29, 1922 – March 3, 1994) was an American author, editor and professor. He was best known for his novels Butcher's Crossing (1960), Stoner (1965), and Augustus (1972), which won a U.S. National Book Award.

== Life ==
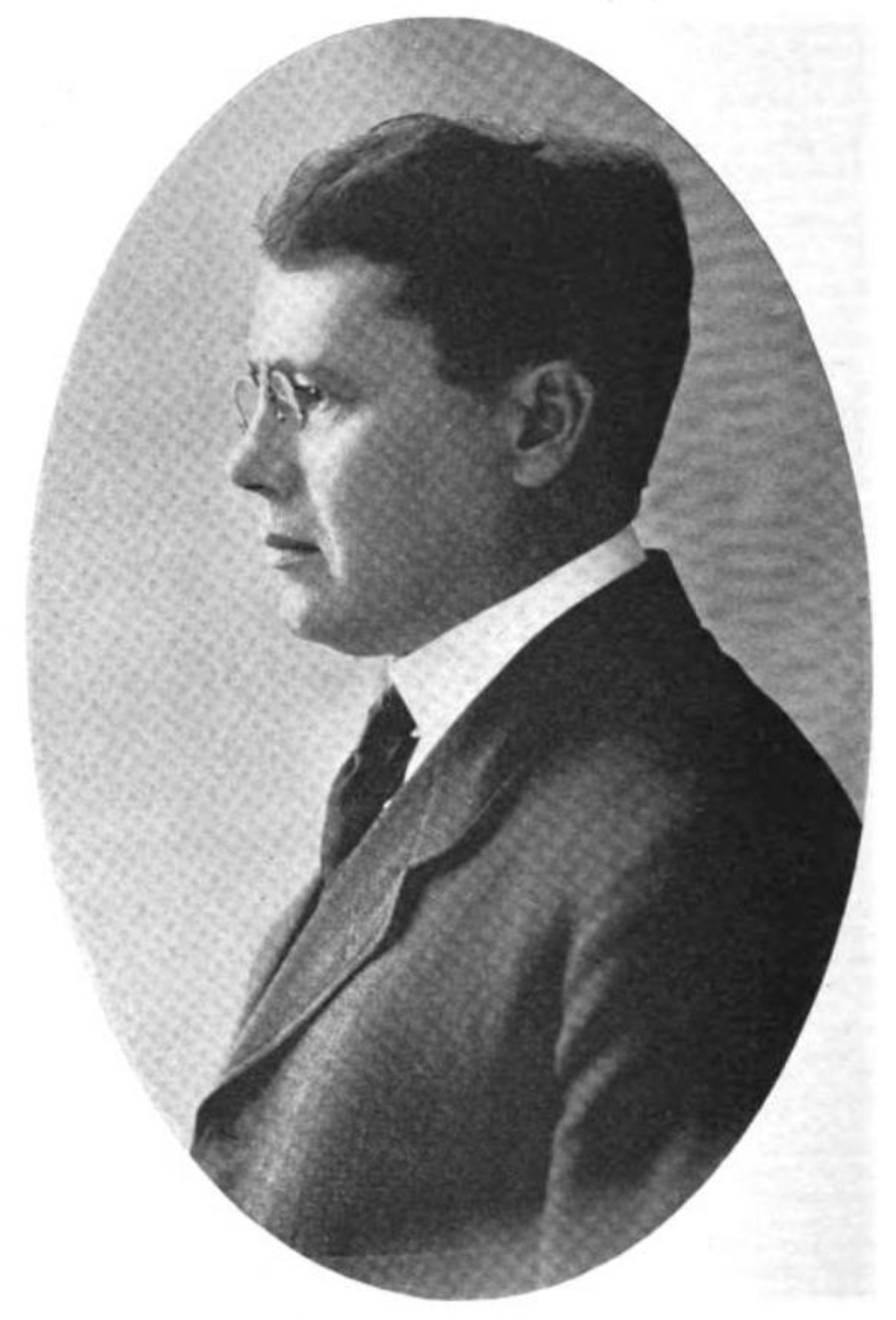
Williams in the 1940s

Williams was born in Clarksville, Texas. Shortly thereafter, his family moved to Wichita Falls, Texas, in pursuit of the Texas oil boom. His grandparents were farmers; his father, J.E. Jewell, worked in a feed store. Jewell disappeared in mysterious circumstances when Williams was two years old, and his mother remarried to George Williams, a local shift worker in Wichita Falls. John Williams attended a local junior college for a year but dropped out after failing freshman English, and then worked in media before joining the war effort in early 1942 by enlisting in the United States Army Air Force. He spent two and a half years as a sergeant in India, China, and Burma. During his enlistment in Calcutta, he wrote pages of a novel, which later became Nothing But the Night, published in 1948 by Swallow Press and later reissued by New York Review Books Classics.

At the end of the war, Williams moved to Denver, Colorado, and enrolled in the University of Denver, receiving Bachelor of Arts (1949) and Master of Arts (1950) degrees. During his time at the University of Denver, his first two books were published, Nothing But the Night (1948), a novel depicting the terror and waywardness resulting from an early traumatic experience, and The Broken Landscape (1949), a collection of poetry. Upon completing his MA, Williams enrolled at the University of Missouri, where he taught and worked on his Ph.D. in English literature, which he obtained in 1954. In the fall of 1955, Williams returned to the University of Denver as an assistant professor, becoming director of the creative writing program. His second novel, Butcher's Crossing (Macmillan, 1960) depicts frontier life in 1870s Kansas.

In 1963, Williams edited and wrote the introduction for the anthology English Renaissance Poetry: A Collection of Shorter Poems from Skelton to Jonson (Doubleday). The publication elicited a backlash from poet and literary critic Yvor Winters who claimed that Williams's anthology overlapped with his canon and the introduction imitated his arguments. The publishers agreed to include an acknowledgement to Winters in the publication.

Williams's second collection of poems, The Necessary Lie (1965), was issued by Verb Publications. He was the founding editor of the University of Denver Quarterly (later Denver Quarterly), which was first issued in 1965. He remained as editor until 1970.

His third novel, Stoner, detailing the tragic life of a University of Missouri English assistant professor, was published by Viking Press in 1965. It was reissued in 2005 by NYRB Classics to widespread critical acclaim. It was subsequently translated and published throughout Europe and, beginning in 2011, became a bestseller in France, the Netherlands, Italy, Israel, and the UK.

His fourth novel, Augustus (Viking, 1972), a rendering of the violent times of Augustus Caesar in Rome, also remains in print. In the year of its release, it shared the National Book Award for Fiction with Chimera by John Barth, the first time that the award was split.

Williams retired from the University of Denver in 1985 and died of respiratory failure in 1994 at home in Fayetteville, Arkansas. He was surrounded by his wife and descendants. A fifth novel, The Sleep of Reason, was unfinished at the time of his death, but two lengthy excerpts were published in Ploughshares and the Denver Quarterly in 1981 and 1986, respectively.

Williams loved the study of literature. In a 1986 interview, he was asked, "And literature is written to be entertaining?" to which he replied, "Absolutely. My God, to read something without joy is stupid."

== Reception and legacy ==
The critic Morris Dickstein has noted that while Butcher's Crossing, Stoner, and Augustus are each "strikingly different in subject," they all "show a similar narrative arc: a young man's initiation, vicious male rivalries, subtler tensions between men and women, fathers and daughters, and finally a bleak sense of disappointment, even futility." Dickstein called Stoner "something rarer than a great novel—it is a perfect novel, so well told and beautifully written, so deeply moving, it takes your breath away."

In 2018, a biography of Williams written by Charles J. Shields titled The Man Who Wrote the Perfect Novel: John Williams, Stoner, and the Writing Life was published by the University of Texas Press.

In a wide-ranging interview with The Paris Review in 2019, Williams's widow, Nancy Gardner, discussed his war service, working methods and alcoholism.

== Translations ==
Stoner has been translated into many languages, including Arabic, Chinese, Croatian, Danish, Dutch, French, German, Greek, Hebrew, Hungarian, Italian, Korean, Persian, Portuguese, Serbian, Spanish, Swedish, and Vietnamese. The acclaimed novelist Anna Gavalda translated Williams's novel into French, which has contributed to its enthusiastic reception by the French literary establishment.

== Works ==
Novels

- Nothing but the Night (1948)
- Butcher's Crossing (1960)
- Stoner (1965)
- Augustus (1972) —shared the National Book Award

Poetry

- The Broken Landscape: Poems (1949)
- The Necessary Lie (1965)

Edited anthology

- English Renaissance Poetry: A Collection of Shorter Poems from Skelton to Jonson (1963)
