= Fumitake Kishida =

Member of the House of Representatives for Hiroshima's 1st district
- In office 1979 – 4 August 1992
- Preceded by: Yukio Hagiwara
- Succeeded by: Fumio Kishida

Personal details
- Born: 19 August 1926 Hiroshima, Japan
- Died: 2 August 1994 (aged 67) Tokyo, Japan
- Party: Liberal Democratic
- Other political affiliations: Kōchikai LDP faction
- Spouse: Sumiko Iguchi (m. 1956)
- Children: Fumio Kishida, Takeo Kishida, Junko, Noriko
- Education: University of Tokyo (LLB)

Fumitake Kishida (Japanese: 岸田 文武, Hepburn: Kishida Fumitake; 19 August 1926 – 4 August 1992) was a Japanese politician. A member of the Liberal Democratic Party, he served as member of the House of Representatives (5 terms). He was also a recipient of the Grand Cordon of the Order of the Rising Sun.

His father was Masaki Kishida, a former member of the House of Representatives of the Liberal Democratic Party and Director-General of the Securities Bureau of the Ministry of Finance. His younger brother was Shunsuke Kishida, Chairman and Advisor of Hiroshima Bank. His wife, Sumiko Iguchi, was the second daughter of Ryoji Iguchi, former president of Nitto Flour Mills. His eldest son was Fumio Kishida, a member of the House of Representatives, the 27th President of the Liberal Democratic Party, and the 100th and 101st Prime Minister of Japan. He belonged to the Kōchikai faction.

== Career ==
=== Early life ===
Kishida was born in Hiroshima.

After graduating from Tokyo High School (now the University of Tokyo Secondary School) in 1945, he entered Tokyo Imperial University. However, as the war was drawing to a close, he was unable to study immediately after being accepted. He was mobilised for daily labour, and in July 1945, nearing the end of the war, he was mobilised as a student and enlisted in a division in Asahikawa. One month later, the atomic bomb was dropped on his hometown of Hiroshima, damaging his home and killing many of his acquaintances. While still a student, he passed the Higher Civil Service Examination. He graduated from the University of Tokyo Faculty of Law, Department of Political Science in 1948.

=== Bureaucratic career ===
He joined the Ministry of Commerce and Industry (now the Ministry of Economy, Trade and Industry) in 1949. [1] He was assigned to the Textiles Bureau. He served as Director of the Accounting Division of the Minister's Secretariat of the Ministry of International Trade and Industry and Director of the Public Utilities Department of the Agency for Natural Resources and Energy. He served as Director-General of the Trade Bureau in 1974 and Commissioner-General of the Small and Medium Enterprise Agency in 1976, before he left in 1978.

=== Political career ===
Kishida was first elected to the House of Representatives at the 1979 Japanese general election and was subsequently elected 5 times. As an MP, he served as a member or chair of the Local Administration Committee, Agriculture, Forestry and Fisheries Committee, Science and Technology Committee, Commerce and Industry Committee, Education Committee, and Special Committee on Price Issues, among others, under the motto of "trustworthy politics." In March 1990, he became Chairman of the Cabinet Committee. During his tenure, he served as the parliamentary deputy minister for internal affairs and communications in the second Nakasone Cabinet and parliamentary deputy minister for education in the third Nakasone Cabinet. During this time, he particularly worked to promote education reform. At the 40th International Conference on Education held in Geneva in December 1986, he delivered a speech as Japan's chief delegate, introducing Japan's efforts in education reform and emphasizing the importance of international cooperation in education.

Within the Liberal Democratic Party, he served as Director of the Urban Affairs Bureau, Vice Chairman of the Resources and Energy Measures Research Committee, Vice Chairman of the Small and Medium Enterprise Research Committee, Deputy Director of the Research Bureau, and Vice Chairman of the Administrative and Financial Research Committee. From December 1988, he served as Director of the Accounting Bureau, assisting the Secretary-General.

Kishida died in a hospital in Tokyo on 4 August 1992, midway through his fifth term at the age of 65 years old. On 7 August he was posthumously awarded the rank of Shoshii (Senior Fourth Rank), the Order of the Rising Sun, Second Class, and the Grand Cordon of the Order of the Rising Sun, Gold and Silver Star. A memorial speech was delivered by Tadayoshi Morii at the plenary session of the House of Representatives on 10 November 1992.

His eldest son, Fumio Kishida, was elected in the following 1993 Japanese general election for the same seat Kishida had represented since 1979.

Assembly seats
Preceded by Suita Kai	(Japan) Chairman of the House of Representatives Cabinet Committee; 1990 – 1991	Succeeded by Riichiro Chikaoka
Government offices
Preceded by Taichi Saito	(Japan) Commissioner of the Small and Medium Enterprise Agency; 1976 – 1978	Succeeded by Sakon Tomosaburo
Preceded by 濃野滋	(Japan) Director-General of the Trade Bureau of the Ministry of International Trade and Industry; 1974 – 1976	Succeeded by 森山信吾
Preceded by Office created	(Japan) Director of the Public Utilities Department, Agency for Natural Resources and Energy; 1973 – 1974	Succeeded by Yusaku Onaga
