= New Form of Capitalism =

Economic policy of Fumio Kishida

New Form of Capitalism 新しい資本主義
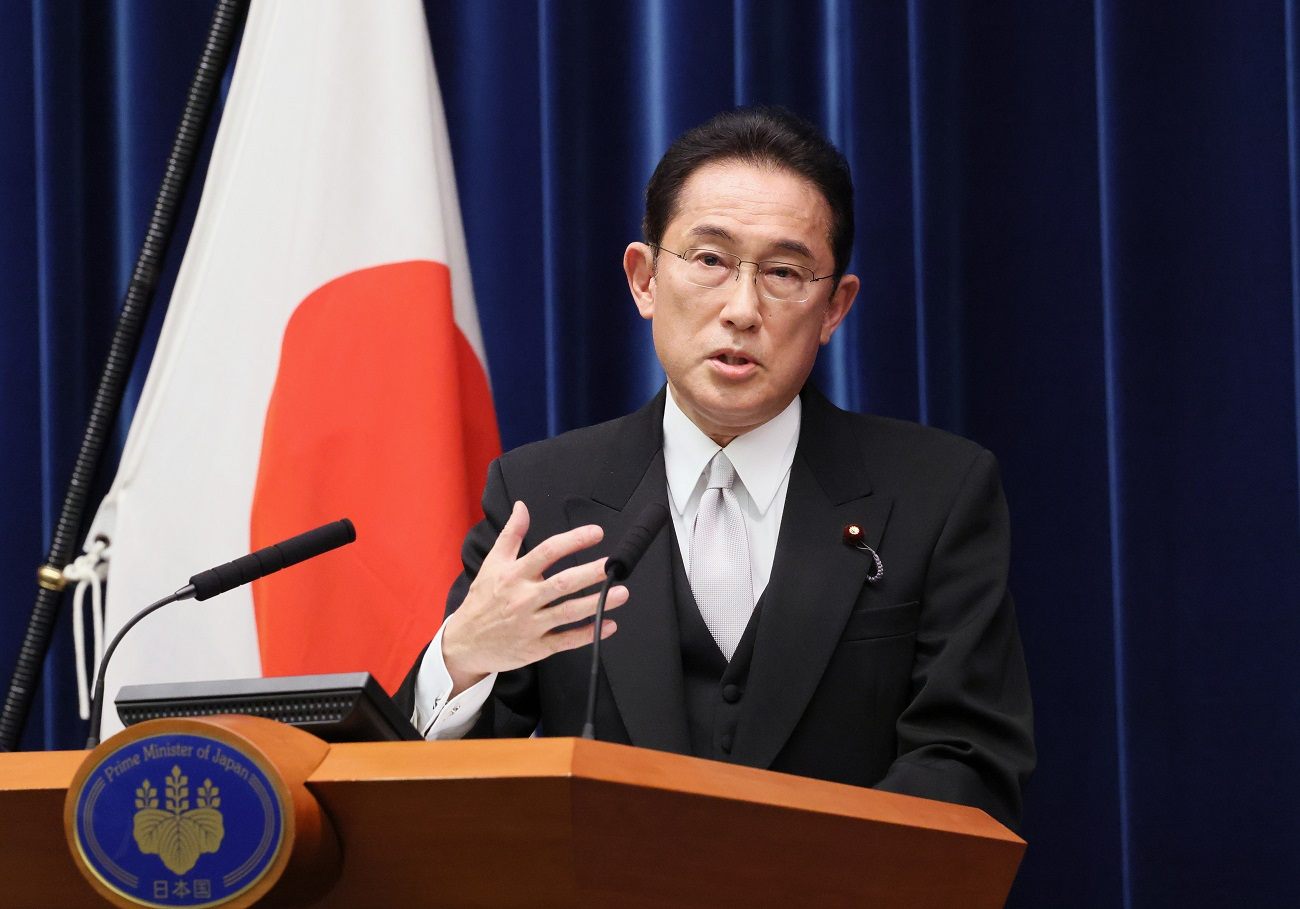
- Duration: 2021–2025
- Location: Japan
- Type: Economic policies
- Organized by: Advocate: Prime Minister of Japan Fumio Kishida

New Form of Capitalism (Japanese: 新しい資本主義, Hepburn: Atarashii Shihonshugi) is an economic policy of Fumio Kishida, the 101st Prime Minister of Japan. It aims to break away from the neoliberal economy of the post-Koizumi Cabinet, and to create a 'virtuous circle of growth and distribution' and to 'pioneer a new post-COVID-19 society'.

== Summary ==
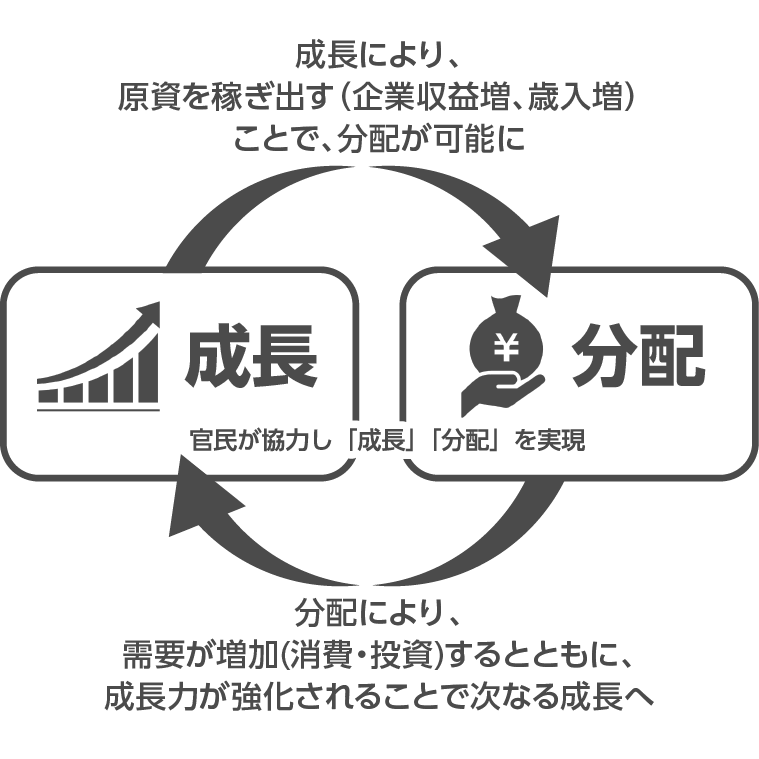
Diagram of the 'Virtuous circle of growth and distribution'

Kishida, who at the time was a candidate in Japan's 2021 Liberal Democratic Party leadership election, first announced the idea of a New Form of Capitalism as 'aiming to build a new capitalism'. The details of the policy are described in Kishida's book "Kishida's Vision: From Division to Cooperation" (岸田ビジョン 分断から協調へ). The book was published on 11 September 2020 to coincide with Kishida's run for the 2020 Liberal Democratic Party presidential election. The book includes the following four growth strategies:

1. Innovation through science and technology
2. Revitalisation of local regions through the "Digital Garden City Nation" Initiative
3. Realisation of carbon neutrality, and establishment of economic security.

The three main distribution strategies are:

1. Strengthening distribution for working people
2. Expanding the middle class and addressing Japan's declining birth rate from a different perspective
3. Increasing the income of essential workers

Kishida, with himself as advocate, has not elaborated on these meanings and some in the ruling and opposition parties have said they do not fully understand the strategies. However, in an online summit meeting with US President Joe Biden, after Kishida spoke passionately about a New Form of Capitalism, President Biden agreed, stating: "Excellent, exactly what I am trying to do". Masakazu Tokura, Chairman of the Japan Business Federation (commonly referred to as Keidanren), also expressed his approval, stating that New Form of Capitalism is in line with Keidanren's vision of "sustainable capitalism".

On 15 October 2021, the headquarters for the Realisation of a New Form of Capitalism was established. However, domestic and global events occurring in 2022, such as the resurgence of COVID-19 infections, Russia's invasion of Ukraine, and the rapid rise in prices and depreciation of the yen triggered by the global economic fluctuations that these events caused, forced Japan's government to prioritise addressing the urgent and important global and domestic situation. In response, Prime Minister Fumio Kishida expressed his view that the top priority for realising a New Form of Capitalism is finding a solution for economic difficulties such as inflation and a weak yen, as well as 'structural wage increases' that allow for a continuous pump up of the virtuous circle of growth and distribution.

== Developments ==
=== First edition ===
On 7 June 2022, the Japanese Cabinet approved the "Grand Design and Action Plan for a New Form of Capitalism".

=== 2023 Revision ===
On 6 June 2023, the Japanese government compiled the Grand Design and Action Plan for a New Form of New Capitalism 2023 Revised Version. The four pillars of the implementation plan are:

1. Investment in people, structural wage increases and the 'Three-Pronged Labour Market Reform Guidelines' - such as reskilling support etc.
2. Investment in GX (decarbonised society) and DX (digital transformation), etc. - Position semiconductors, rechargeable batteries, bio-manufacturing and data centres as strategic areas. Other areas include strengthening research and development into generative artificial intelligence.
3. Facilitating the entry and exit of enterprises into the market and promoting the five-year plan for start-up developments
4. Building economic and social systems that solve social problems.

among others. Other provisions include the 'Asset Income Doubling Plan and Forming of a Thick Middle Class'. The revised draft was approved by the Cabinet on 16 June after the content was amended following consultations with the ruling parties.

== Organisation ==
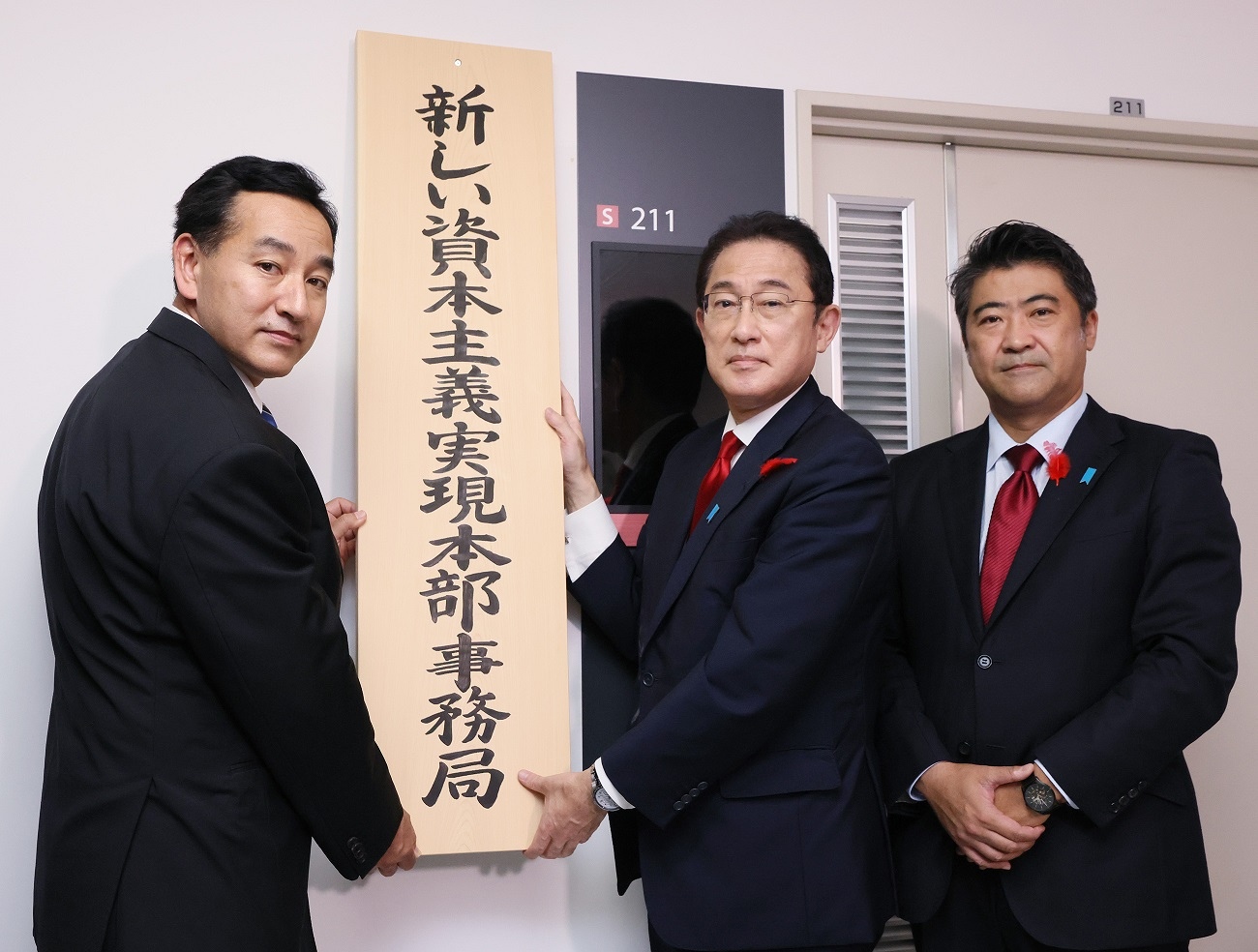
Prime Minister Fumio Kishida (centre), Minister in Charge Daishiro Yamagiwa (left) and Deputy Chief Cabinet Secretary Seiji Kihara (right) hang the secretariat's signboard on 15 October 2021, when the Headquarters for the Realisation of New Capitalism was established.

On 15 October 2021, the First Kishida Cabinet approved the Cabinet decision to establish the Headquarters for the Realisation of a New Form of Capitalism, headed by the Prime Minister. The deputy head is the New Form of Capitalism Cabinet minister and the Chief Cabinet Secretary. Members of the headquarters are all other Cabinet Ministers. The Cabinet has stipulated that: "the general affairs of the Headquarters shall be handled by the Cabinet Secretariat with the help of the Cabinet Office."

A Council for the Realisation of a New Form of Capitalism was also established as a subordinate body on this day. 15 people from the private sector were appointed as expert members: Yuri Okina, Kentaro Kawabe, Kengo Sakurada, Takuko Sawada, Ken Shibusawa, Takako Suwa, Masakazu Tokura, Kazuhiko Toyama, Mirai Hirano, Yutaka Matsuo, Akio Mimura, Yumiko Murakami, Haruka Mera, Noriyuki Yanagawa, Tomoko Yoshino. The total number of members was later increased to 16 with Akio Mimura leaving and Ken Kobayashi and Rebecca Henderson joining. Kengo Sakurada was also replaced by Takeshi Niinami, who has remained on the panel until present.

== George Hara's Public Interest Capitalism ==
The theoretical framework for a New Form of Capitalism comes from George Hara, Prime Minister Kishida's economic policy advisor, and his idea of Public Interest Capitalism. Hara explains the concept in his book "'Public Interest' Capitalism: The End of Anglo-American Capitalism". Ignoring the definition set out in the Companies Act, which states that a company belongs to its shareholders, Hara independently advocates that the company should be transformed into one that pursues the interests of society as a whole, in other words: the public interest.

The Public Interest Capitalism Promotion Council (PICC), a general incorporated association established in 2014 with the aim of promoting public interest capitalism, is reportedly closely associated with the RINRI Institute of Ethics and the Tsuzuki Education Group.

== List of New Form of Capitalism Cabinet Ministers ==
#	Name	Cabinet	Time in office
Cabinet Ministers (responsible for planning and coordinating affairs under the jurisdiction of the various administrative departments in order to comprehensively promote measures to build a new capitalism based on the virtuous circle of growth and distribution
1	Daishiro Yamagiwa	First Kishida Cabinet	October 4, 2021 - November 4, 2021
2	Daishiro Yamagiwa	Second Kishida Cabinet	November 4, 2021 - August 10, 2022 August 10, 2022 - October 24, 2022
2	Daishiro Yamagiwa	Second Kishida Cabinet (First Reshuffle)	August 10, 2022 - October 24, 2022
3	Shigeyuki Gotō	Second Kishida Cabinet (First Reshuffle)	October 25, 2022 - September 13, 2023
4	Yoshitaka Shindō	Second Kishida Cabinet (Second Reshuffle)	September 13, 2023 - October 1, 2024

== See also ==
- Abenomics
- Hometown tax
