= Statue of Peace in Berlin =

Monument for "comfort women" in Berlin

Coordinates: 52.532858°N 13.339372°E

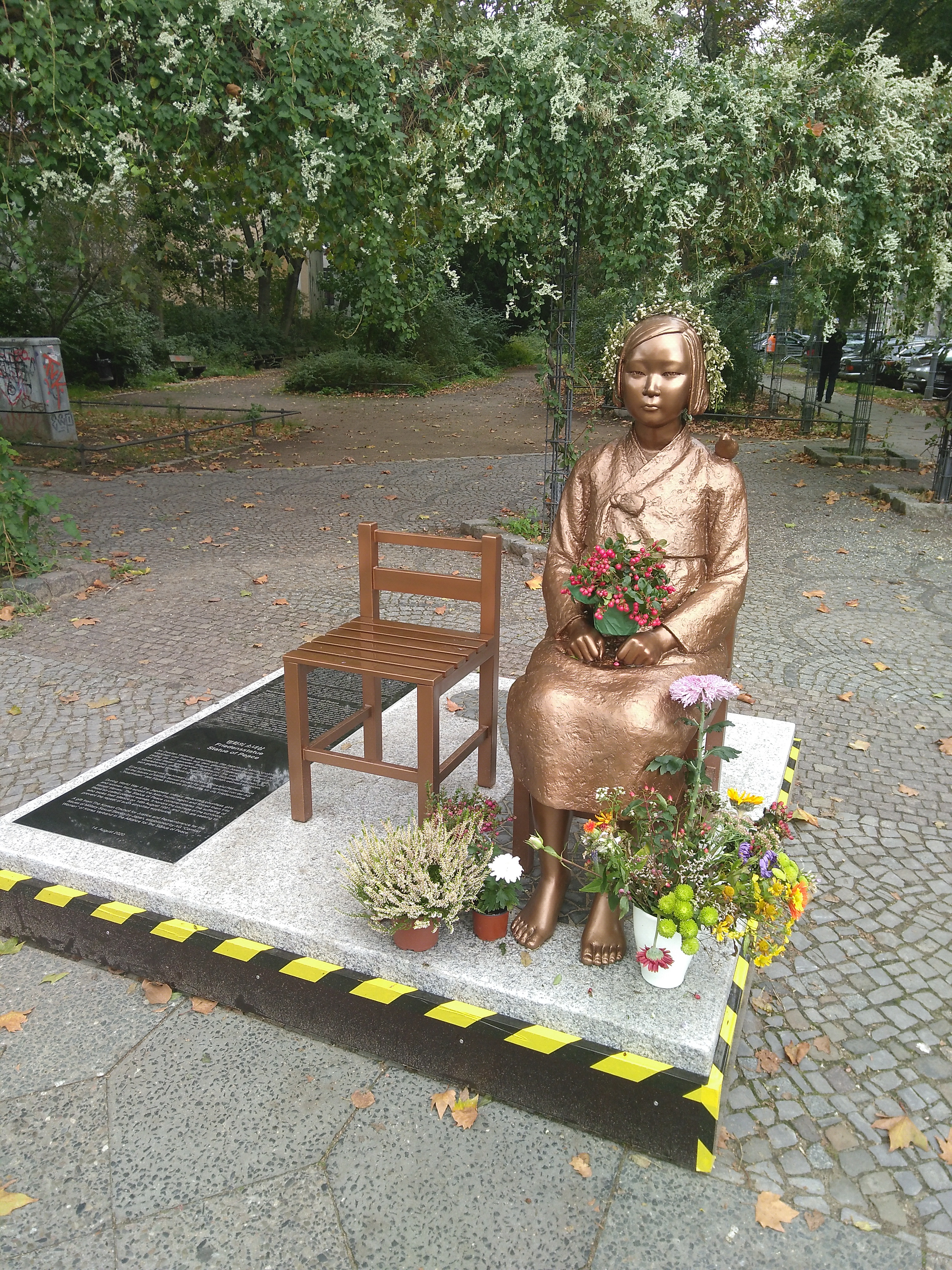
Peace statue of comfort women in Berlin-Moabit

The Peace Statue was a monument located in Union Square in the Moabit district of Mitte, Berlin for the "comfort women" (girls and women who were forced into prostitution in Japanese military brothels during World War II). It also serves as a general symbol against sexual violence against girls and women. The monument was initiated by the "Action Group Comfort Women" of the Korea Verband and was unveiled on September 28, 2020. The statue has sparked a discourse on commemorative cultures among local, state, and diplomatic levels. It was removed on October 17, 2025, pending a proposed relocation to Unionstrasse 8.

The bronze statue was designed by the South Korean artist couple Kim Eun-sung (b. 1965) and Kim Seo-kyung. It is the first statue of its kind to be installed in a public space in Germany.

== Design ==
The centerpiece of the sculpture is the bronze figure of a young girl in traditional Korean attire (Hanbok). The clothing and age are meant to reflect the victims' situation at the time of their abduction. Among a studied group of slightly over 800 “comfort women,” 85 percent were over 20 years old.

== Political controversies ==
The monument was approved by the Mitte District Office. On September 29, 2020, Japanese Cabinet Secretary and government spokesman Katsunobu Kato announced that they would seek to have the statue removed. Japanese Foreign Minister Toshimitsu Motegi reportedly contacted German Foreign Minister Heiko Maas according to the nationalist daily Sankei Shinbun. There had already been similar interventions by the Japanese government in Freiburg and San Francisco.

On October 8, 2020, the Mitte District Office revoked the statue's permit, citing concerns that the statue promoted hatred and was not in line with values of reconciliation. The district mayor of Berlin-Mitte, Stephan von Dassel, also stated that the statue addressed a politically and historically sensitive conflict between two nations, which was not suitable for resolution in Germany. The Korea Verband was ordered to remove the statue by October 14, 2020. In response to an urgent application by the Korea Verband, the Berlin Administrative Court temporarily halted the removal order. On the same day, 300 people demonstrated in Berlin for the statue's preservation. Alliance 90/The Greens Berlin-Mitte, to which Stephan von Dassel belongs, issued a statement supporting the statue's retention.

In December 2020, the district assembly of Berlin-Mitte voted in favor of permanently retaining the Peace Statue. The Korea Verband applied for an extended installation of the statue in the summer of 2021, which was initially approved by the district office for another year. In November 2022, district mayor Stefanie Remlinger announced in a subcommittee meeting of the district assembly that the installation of the Peace Statue in Berlin would be extended for another two years. On April 16, 2025, the permit was extended again until September 28, 2025 by the Berlin Administrative Court. On October 6, 2025, the Berlin Administrative Court rejected any further extensions and the Mitte District Office subsequently ordered its removal. The removal order was upheld by the Higher Administrative Court of Berlin-Brandenburg against an appeal from the Korea Verband, on October 9, 2025, although the additional €3,000 fine was struck down. It was removed on October 17, 2025 by the Mitte District Office via a contractor, and is being stored until a proposed relocation to Unionstrasse 8, one hundred metres away from its previous location.

== International censorship ==
The artist duo Kim Seo-kyung and Kim Eun-sung have faced censorship in Japan, most recently in 2019 when an art exhibition in Nagoya featuring a similar statue was abruptly closed.

== Other comfort women monuments ==
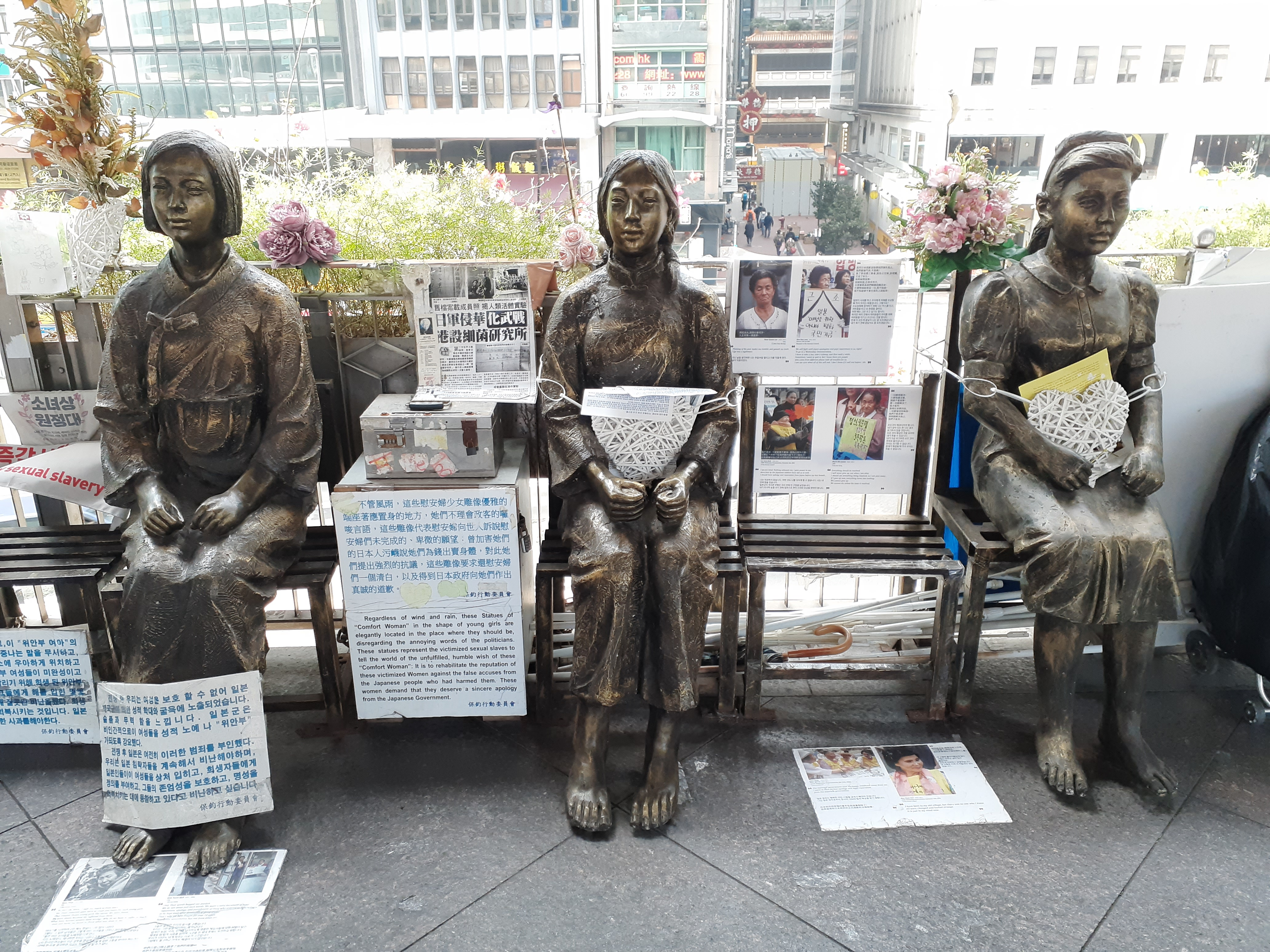
Peace Statue in Hong Kong

The first Peace Statue was erected in 2011 in front of the Japanese Embassy in Seoul. Similar monuments can be found worldwide, including in the US, Canada, Australia, Hong Kong, the Philippines, and Germany. The first monument dedicated to "comfort women" has stood in Tateyama (Chiba), Japan, since 1986.

An initial initiative in Germany failed in 2017 in Freiburg due to Japanese diplomatic resistance. The sculpture was subsequently installed in the Nepal-Himalaya Park in Wiesent near Regensburg. Another monument is located on the grounds of the Korean Evangelical Church in Frankfurt. Since July 8, 2022, another Peace Statue has been located in the campus garden of the University of Kassel.
