= Janssen (surname) =

- Language: Dutch

Origin
- Meaning: "son of Jan"

Janssen (Dutch pronunciation: [ˈjɑn.sə(n)]) is a Dutch patronymic surname cognate to the English surname Johnson. It is the 7th most common name in the Netherlands and the most common (over 131,000 people), when combined with the spelling variant Jansen. Notable people with the surname include:

- Abraham Janssen (c. 1699–1765), British baronet politician, son of Theodore Janssen
- Abraham Janssen (chessplayer) (1720–1795), British chess player
- Albert-Édouard Janssen (1883–1966), Belgian monetary theorist and Minister of State
- Anne Janssen (born 1982), German politician
- Anton Janssen (born 1963), Dutch footballer
- Arnold Janssen (1837–1909), German-Dutch Roman Catholic priest, missionary and saint
- Ben Janssen, Dutch heavy metal guitarist
- Benno Janssen (1874–1964), American architect
- Benny Janssen (born c. 1960), Dutch sidecarcross rider
- Brian Janssen (born 1962), Australian boxer
- Bryan Janssen (born 1995), Dutch football goalkeeper
- Cam Janssen (born 1984), American ice hockey player
- Camille Janssen (1837–1926), Belgian Governor-General of the (Congo 1886–1892)
- Casey Janssen (born 1981), American baseball player for the Washington Nationals
- Charles-Emmanuel Janssen (1907–1986), Belgian businessman and politician, son of Emmanuel Janssen
- Charlie Janssen (born 1971), American politician
- Constant Janssen (1895–1970), Belgian physician and founder of the predecessor of Janssen Pharmaceutica
- David Janssen (1931–1980), American actor
- Deike Janssen (born 1996), German politician
- Dennis Janssen (born 1992), Dutch footballer
- Diego Janssen (born 1981), Uruguayan guitarist and composer
- Dirk Janssen (1881–1986), Dutch gymnast
- Dominique Janssen (born 1995), Dutch football defender
- Edward H. Janssen (1815–1877), German-born American politician; Treasurer of Wisconsin (1852–1856)
- Eilene Janssen (born 1938), American film and television actress
- Emmanuel Janssen (1879–1955), Belgian businessman who founded the Union Chimique Belge chemical company
- Ewert Janssen (died c. 1692), Danish architect
- Famke Janssen (born 1964), Dutch actress, director, screenwriter and fashion model
- Frances Janssen (1926–2008), American baseball pitcher
- Geneviève Janssen-Pevtschin (1915–2011), Belgian lawyer and first female magistrate in Belgium
- Georges Janssen (1892–1941), Belgian lawyer, civil servant and governor of the National Bank of Belgium 1938–41
- Gerard Janssen (born 1946), Dutch-born jeweller, watchmaker and politician in British Columbia
- Gheerart Janssen (fl. 1612–1623), sculptor working in Jacobean England, son of Gheerart Janssen the elder
- Gheerart Janssen the elder (died 1611), Dutch sculptor who operated a monument workshop in Elizabethan and Jacobean England
- Guus Janssen (born 1951), Dutch pianist and composer of contemporary music
- Henk Janssen (1890–1969), Dutch tug of war competitor
- Henry J. Janssen (1876–19??), American (Wisconsin) politician
- Herbert Janssen (1892–1965), German operatic baritone
- Horst Janssen (1929–1995), German draftsman, printmaker, poster artist and illustrator
  - Horst-Janssen-Museum
- Huub Janssen (1937–2008), Dutch jazz drummer
- Inge Janssen (born 1989), Dutch rower
- Ivo Janssen (born 1963), Dutch classical pianist
- Jan Janssen (born 1940), Dutch road bicycle racer, Tour de France winner 1968
- Jan Janssen (gymnast) (1885–1953), Dutch Olympic gymnast
- Jan Janssen (ice hockey) (born 1952), American-Dutch ice hockey player
- Jann-Peter Janssen (1945–2022), German politician
- Jarno Janssen (born 2000), Dutch footballer
- Jean-Paul Janssen (1940–1986), French cameraman and documentary film maker
- Jeannette Janssen, Dutch-Canadian mathematician
- Johannes Janssen (1829–1891), German historian and priest
- John Janssen (1835–1913), German-born American Roman Catholic bishop in Illinois
- Jonathan Janssen (born 1995), New Zealand basketball player
- Jules Janssen (1824–1907), French astronomer (see Pierre Jansen)
- Julia Janssen (1900–1982), German stage and film actress
- Justin Janssen (born 2006), Danish footballer
- Karl Janssen (1855–1927), German Baroque revival sculptor
- Kaylene Janssen (born 1968), Australian football midfielder
- Maarten Janssen (born 1962), Dutch economist
- Madison Janssen (born 1994), Australian cyclist
- Marco Janssen (born 1969), Dutch econometrist
- Mark Janssen (born 1992), Dutch football striker
- Martine Janssen (born 1977), Dutch breaststroke swimmer
- Miguel Janssen (born 1970), Dutch-Aruban sprinter
- Nelson Janßen (born 1990), German politician
- Olaf Janßen (born 1966), German football midfielder and manager
- Patrick Janssen (born 1987), Canadian curler
- Paul Janssen (1926–2003), Belgian physician and founder of Janssen Pharmaceutica
  - Dr. Paul Janssen Award for Biomedical Research
- Paula Janssen (born 1996), Brazilian drummer for Quimere
- Peter Janssen (1844–1908), German historical painter
- Pierre Janssen (also Jules Janssen; 1824–1907), French astronomer, Named after him:
  - Janssen (lunar crater) and Janssen (Martian crater)
  - Janssen Medal (French Academy of Sciences), an astrophysics award
  - Janssen Peak, Antarctic mountain
  - Janssen revolver, camera that originated chronophotography
- Ray Janssen (1937–2022), American (Nebraska) politician
- René Janssen (born 1959), Dutch nanotechnologist
- Richard Janssen (born 1961), Dutch blues rock musician, leader of the band Fatal Flowers
- Rik Janssen (born 1957), Dutch Socialist Party politician
- Roel Janssen (born 1990), Dutch football defender
- Roger Janssen (born 1977), Belgian darts player
- Ronald Janssen (born 1971), Belgian serial killer
- Ruud Janssen (born 1959), Dutch Fluxus and mail artist
- Ruud Jansen (chess player) (born 1971), Dutch chess player
- Simon Janssen (born 2000), Dutch footballer
- Sjoerd Janssen (born 1984), Dutch electronic dance musician, half of Showtek
- Sjef Janssen (born 1950), Dutch equestrian and dressage coach
- Sjefke Janssen (1919–2014), Dutch road bicycle racer
- Stephen Janssen, 4th Baronet (died 1777), English Member of Parliament and Lord Mayor of London
- Stephen Vost Janssen (1879–1945), Australian violin and viola player
- Ted Janssen (1936–2017), Dutch physicist
- Theo Janssen (born 1981), Dutch football midfielder
- Theodore Janssen (c. 1658–1748), French-born English baronet and financier
- Tim Janssen (born 1986), Dutch football striker
- Tiny Janssen (born 1960s), Dutch sidecar cross rider
- Travis Janssen, American college baseball coach
- Vincent Janssen (born 1994), Dutch football striker
- Walter Janssen (1887–1976), German film actor
- Werner Janssen (1899–1990), American conductor, composer and film score composer
- Werner Janssen (philosopher) (born 1944), Dutch/German philosopher, Germanist, author and poet
- Willem Janssen (footballer, born 1880) (1880–1976), Dutch footballer
- Willem Janssen (footballer, born 1986), Dutch footballer
- Willy Janssen (born 1960), Dutch footballer
- Wouter Janssen (born 1982), Dutch electronic dance musician, half of Showtek
- Zacharias Janssen (1585–before 1632), Dutch spectacle-maker, co-inventor of the telescope and the compound microscope
