= Mitte 7 =

State electoral district of Germany

- Electoral district for the Berlin House of Representatives
- Mitte 7 in 2026
- District: Mitte
- Electorate: 29,285 (2026)

Current electoral district
- Party: The Left
- Member: Deike Janssen

Mitte 7 is an electoral constituency (German: Wahlkreis) represented in the House of Representatives of Berlin. It elects one member via first-past-the-post voting.

== Geography ==
The constituency comprises the areas of Humboldthain and Nettelbeckplatz within the borough of Mitte.

There were 29,285 eligible voters in 2026.

== Members ==
Election	Member	Party	%
2016	Maja Lasić	SPD	31.5
2021	Laura Neugebauer	Green	28.1
2023	Laura Neugebauer	Green	30.1
2026	Deike Janssen	Left	43.4

== Election results ==
=== 2026 election ===
State election (2026): Mitte 7
Notes:	Blue background denotes the winner of the electorate vote. Pink background denotes a candidate elected from their party list. Yellow background denotes an electorate win by a list member, or other incumbent. A ✓ or ✗ denotes status of any incumbent, win or lose respectively.						
Party	Candidate	Votes	%	±%	Party votes	%	±%
Left	Deike Janssen	8,235	43.4	▲25.9	8,416	44.1	▲26.5
Greens	Tarek Massalme	3,420	18.0	▼12.1	2,958	15.5	▼13.0
SPD	Maja Lasić	2,370	12.5	▼5.9	2,080	10.9	▼5.5
CDU	Daniela Fritz	1,707	9.0	▼10.3	1,756	9.2	▼8.6
AfD	Volker Seefeldt	1,664	8.8	▲3.4	1,667	8.7	▲3.1
BSW	Martin Hantke	872	4.6		1,019	5.3	
Volt	Martin Hergert	413	2.2		373	2.0	▲0.7
FDP	Franz Teresiak	288	1.5	▼1.6	294	1.5	▼2.0
Tierschutzpartei					286	1.5	▼0.7
PARTEI					132	0.7	▼1.1
PdF					43	0.2	
ÖDP					25	0.1	Steady
DKP					25	0.1	▼0.1
SGP					16	0.1	Steady
du.					15	0.1	▼0.2
Informal votes		371			235		
Total valid votes		18,969			19,105		
Turnout		19,340	66.0	▲15.2			
Left gain from Greens	Majority	4,815	25.4				

=== 2023 repeat election ===
Changes denoted below for the 2023 election are compared to the 2016 election, as the 2021 election was declared invalid.

State election (2023): Mitte 7
Notes:	Blue background denotes the winner of the electorate vote. Pink background denotes a candidate elected from their party list. Yellow background denotes an electorate win by a list member, or other incumbent. A ✓ or ✗ denotes status of any incumbent, win or lose respectively.						
Party	Candidate	Votes	%	±%	Party votes	%	±%
Greens	Laura Neugebauer	4,289	30.1	▲9.9	4,047	28.5	▲7.8
CDU	Daniela Fritz	2,753	19.3	▲7.3	2,526	17.8	▲5.7
SPD	✗ Maja Lasić	2,623	18.4	▼13.0	2,333	16.4	▼7.8
Left	Tobias Schulze	2,492	17.5	▲0.5	2,500	17.6	▼0.1
AfD	Herbert Michael Wehlus	768	5.4	▼5.0	799	5.6	▼4.3
FDP	Marie-Florence Mahwera	448	3.1	▼1.0	497	3.5	▼0.9
Tierschutzpartei	Josepha Martha Aust	376	2.6		318	2.2	▲0.7
PARTEI	Frank Siegel	330	2.3		261	1.8	▼2.0
Team Todenhöfer					197	1.4	
Volt					172	1.2	
dieBasis	Markus Binapfl	132	0.9		91	0.6	
Pirates					77	0.5	▼2.0
Klimaliste					61	0.4	
du.					45	0.3	
Gray Panthers					42	0.3	▼0.5
The Grays					41	0.3	
Bergpartei, die ÜberPartei					38	0.3	
DKP					35	0.2	Steady
Verjüngungsforschung					27	0.2	▼0.1
Mieterpartei					26	0.2	
Humanists					26	0.2	
FW					15	0.1	
ÖDP	Roland Schnell	20	0.1		14	0.1	
ÖDP					14	0.1	
SGP					14	0.1	▼0.3
Bildet Berlin!					12	0.1	
NPD					4	0.0	▼0.3
LKR					3	0.0	▼0.3
The Pinks/Alliance 21					2	0.0	
BüSo					1	0.0	▼0.1
Informal votes		135			119		
Total valid votes		14,231			14,224		
Turnout		14,373	50.8	▼5.1			
Greens gain from SPD	Majority	1,536	10.8				

=== 2021 election (annulled) ===
The election in 2021 was annulled and rerun in 2023.

State election (2021): Mitte 7
Notes:	Blue background denotes the winner of the electorate vote. Pink background denotes a candidate elected from their party list. Yellow background denotes an electorate win by a list member, or other incumbent. A ✓ or ✗ denotes status of any incumbent, win or lose respectively.						
Party	Candidate	Votes	%	±%	Party votes	%	±%
Greens	Laura Neugebauer	5,179	28.1	▲7.8	4,638	25.0	▲4.4
SPD	✗ Maja Lasić	4,389	23.8	▼7.7	3,686	19.9	▼4.3
Left	Tobias Schulze	3,444	18.7	▲1.7	3,453	18.6	▲1.0
CDU	Daniela Fritz	2,053	11.1	▼0.9	1,849	10.0	▼2.1
FDP	Marie-Florence Mahwera	964	5.2	▲1.1	978	5.3	▲0.9
AfD	Herbert Michael Wehlus	936	5.1	▼5.4	927	5.0	▼4.9
Team Todenhöfer					725	3.9	
PARTEI	Frank Siegel	557	3.0		446	2.4	▼1.4
Tierschutzpartei	Josepha Martha Aust	534	2.9		329	1.8	▲0.2
Volt					291	1.6	
dieBasis	Markus Binapfl	351	1.9		257	1.4	
Klimaliste					171	0.9	
FW					111	0.6	
Pirates					108	0.6	▼2.0
Humanists					87	0.5	
The Grays					80	0.4	
APT					66	0.4	
du.					62	0.3	
Gray Panthers					54	0.3	▼0.5
DKP					42	0.2	▼0.1
Bergpartei, die ÜberPartei					39	0.2	
Mieterpartei					38	0.2	
Verjüngungsforschung					36	0.2	▼0.1
ÖDP	Roland Schnell	52	0.3		27	0.1	
Bildet Berlin!					10	0.1	
SGP					10	0.1	▼0.3
NPD					7	0.0	▼0.3
The Pinks/Alliance 21					5	0.0	
BüSo					4	0.0	▼0.1
LKR					4	0.0	0.3
Informal votes		283			213		
Total valid votes		18,459			18,540		
Turnout		18,806	66.8	▲10.9			
Greens gain from SPD	Majority	790	4.3				

== See also ==
- Politics of Berlin
- House of Representatives of Berlin
