= Crettaz =

Crettaz is a surname. Notable people with the surname include:

- Bernard Crettaz (1938–2022), Swiss sociologist and ethnologist
- Gonzalo Crettaz (born 2000), Argentine footballer
- Véronique Crettaz (1954–2011), French murder victim
