= Étienne Dedroog =

Belgian serial killer

- Born: 1971 (age 54–55); Maasmechelen, Limburg, Belgium
- Other names: "The Lodgers' Killer" "B&B Murderer"
- Convictions: Murder, Car theft, Fuel fraud
- Penalty: Life imprisonment (Belgium); 25 years imprisonment (France)

Details
- Victims: 3–4
- Span of crimes: October – November 2011
- Country: France, Belgium; Spain (suspected)
- States: Drôme, Luxembourg; Andalusia (suspected)
- Date apprehended: 2 December 2011
- Imprisoned at: Lantin Prison

Étienne Dedroog (born 1971), known as The Lodgers' Killer, is a Belgian criminal and serial killer, responsible for killing a woman in France and the double murder of a Flemish couple. He is also suspected of another murder in Spain. Dedroog was sentenced to life imprisonment for the double murder, 25 years for the France murder and is currently being investigated for the Spain killing.

== Biography ==
Not much is known about Dedroog's early life, but it was known that he was very attached to his mother. When she died in 2007, at the same time he was getting a divorce, Dedroog experienced a mental breakdown the following year. According to reports from psychiatrists and psychologists, he has a "psychopathic personality", referring to his morbid egocentrism and tendency to manipulate others.

=== Murders ===
==== Véronique Crettaz ====
Before settling in Crettaz's rural B&B home in Bouchet, Dedroog committed fuel fraud, as well as scamming tens of hotels and B&Bs in Châteauneuf-du-Pape, Carpentras, Vedène and Caderousse. On 11 October 2011 he killed the 57-year-old by cutting her external carotid artery, before stealing her credit cards and escaping in her car towards Spain.

==== Tomas Martínez López ====
On the early morning of 16 November, 76-year-old Tomas Martínez López had decided to go fishing near the Cabo de Gata-Níjar Natural Park in Andalusia. After mentioning his intentions at a bar where he had breakfast, he travelled to a location called Cala Raja, only to be later found dead on a gravel road with his car missing. Initially believed to be an accidental fall that had caused the death, it was later revealed that López had been killed by a violent blow to the head with a rock, which had fractured his skull. His missing car was found on 10 December in La Jonquera, with DNA traces from the steering wheel matching those of Étienne Dedroog.

At the time of the murder, Dedroog was in Almería, working as a seasonal orange grower. Authorities later learned that between 17 and 25 November the suspected killer was spotted first in Valencia and then Huesca before returning to Belgium. While examining the deceased's home, they also found a bill issued in Dedroog's name from a hotel in Benidorm, disposed of in the waste bucket.

==== Martin and Mia Blankaerts ====
After arriving in Grandvoir, Neufchâteau, Dedroog was directed towards lodging at the house of Martin and Mia Blankaerts (71 and 69 years old, respectively). Deciding that he wanted to steal their car, but was afraid that they would notice him, Dedroog subsequently strangled the couple. He then stole their car and a computer, before eventually abandoning the car in Bruges.

== Surrender and trials ==
On 1 December, Dedroog sent a message to his niece on Facebook, stating that he "does not recognize [himself] anymore", that "he did not deserve to be called a brother" and that "he had done more serious things than Ronald Janssen". The day after, he surrendered himself to the police in Leuven.

He immediately confessed to killing the Blankaerts, and on 7 November 2014 he was sentenced to life imprisonment by the Assizes in Arlon. However, he vehemently denied killing Crettaz, despite admitting that he had indeed stayed in her lodge on the date of death. Despite the best efforts of his defence team, Dedroog was sentenced to a further 25 years imprisonment by the French assize court.

Since 2015, after a complete investigation, the Spanish police have officially suspected Dedroog as the killer of López, and the lawyer has requested, on behalf of the victim's family, an extradition so he could face trial.

== See also ==
- List of serial killers by country
