= Westerlee, South Holland =

Westerlee
- Hamlet
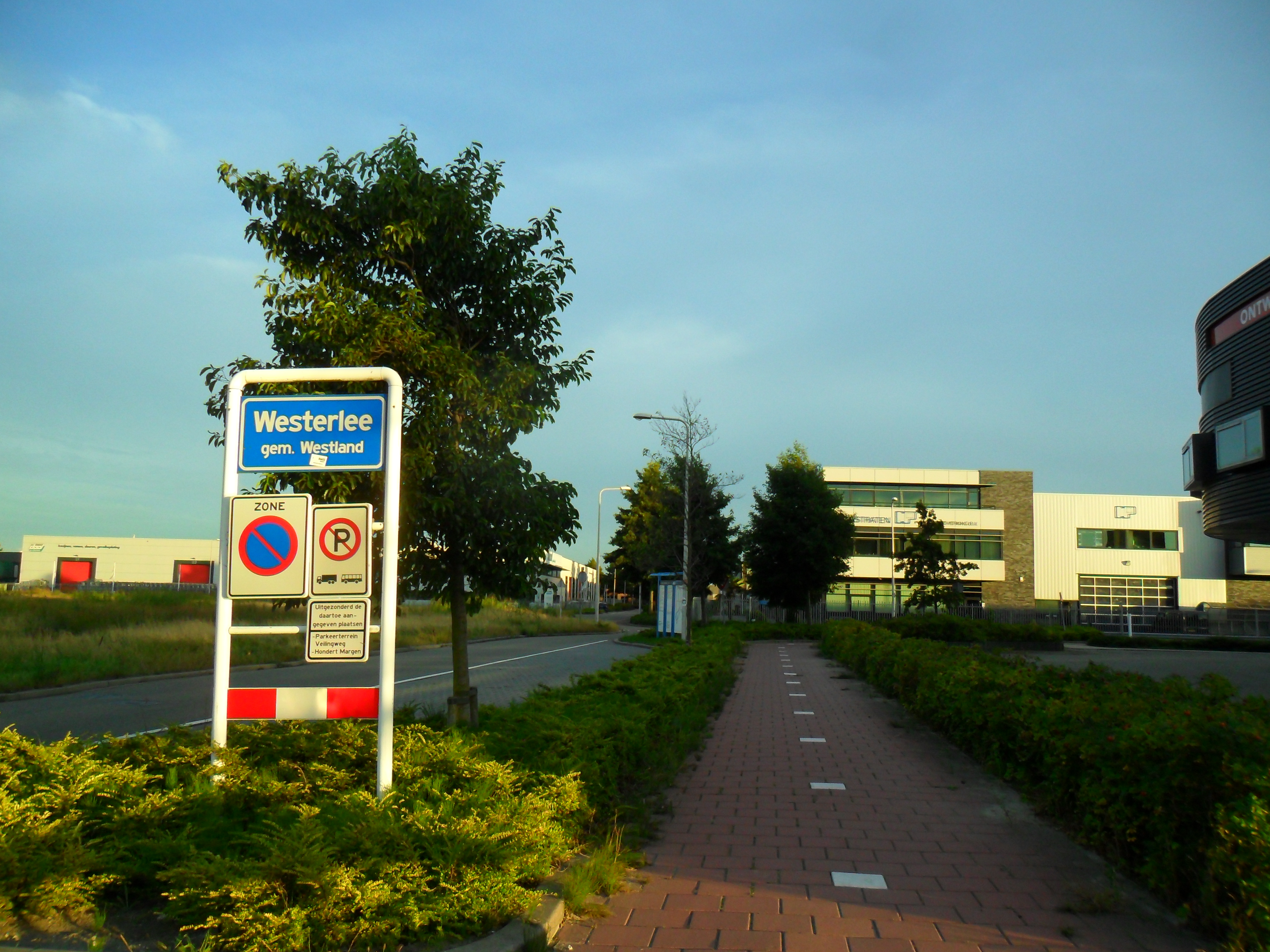
- Westerlee

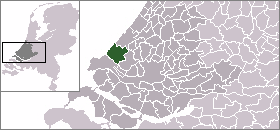

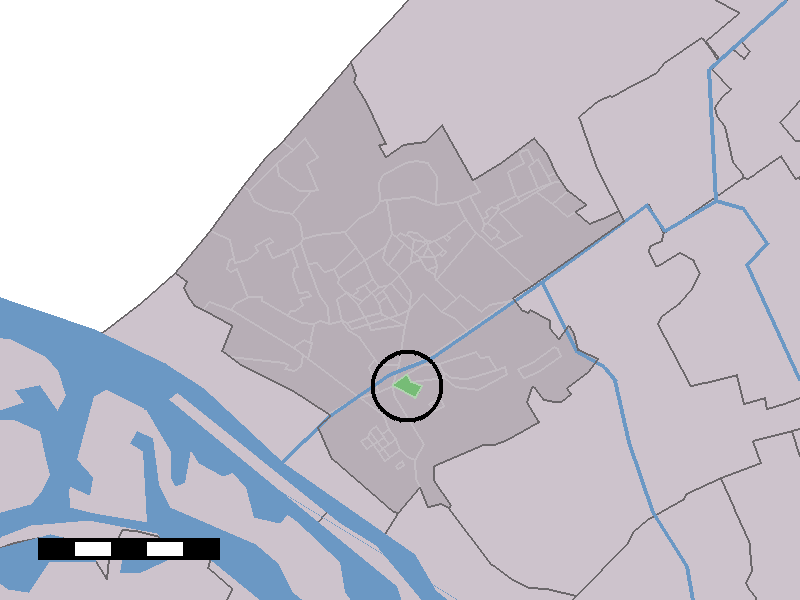
- Westerlee in the municipality of Westland.
- Coordinates: 51°58′23″N 4°13′16″E
- Country: Netherlands
- Province: South Holland
- Municipality: Westland

Area
  - Total: 0.26 km^{2} (0.10 sq mi)

Population (2008)
  - Total: 80
  - Density: 310/km^{2} (800/sq mi)
- Time zone: UTC+1 (CET)
  - Summer (DST): UTC+2 (CEST)

Westerlee is a hamlet in the Dutch province of South Holland. It is a part of the municipality of Westland, and lies about 5 km north of Maassluis.

The statistical area "Westerlee", which also can include the surrounding countryside, has a population of around 70.

Locatie van Westerlee binnen de gemeente Westland
