= Joachim Zeller =

Polish-born German politician (1952–2023)

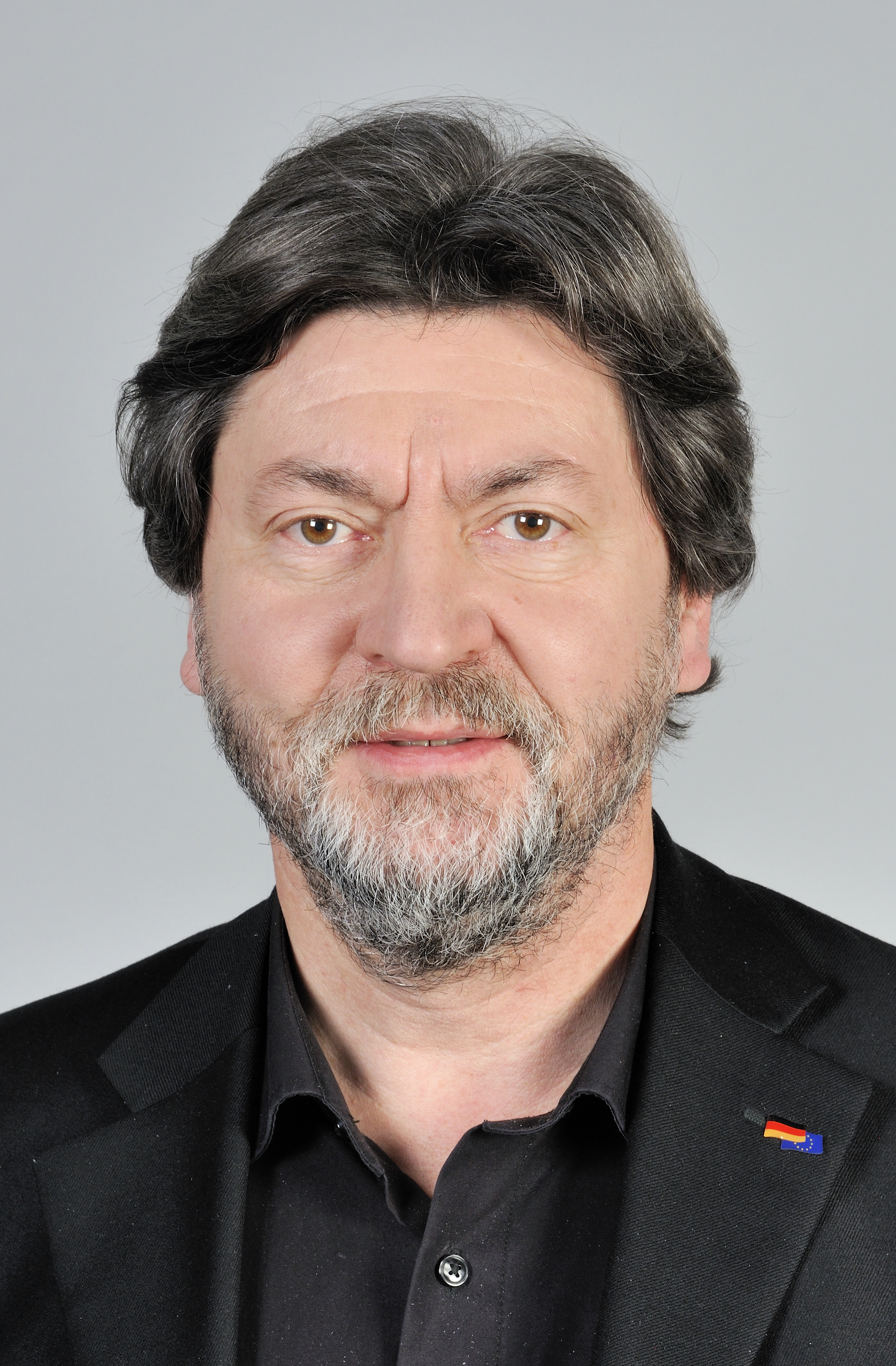

Member of the European Parliament
- In office 1 July 2009 – 2019
- Constituency: Germany

Personal details
- Born: 1 July 1952 Opole, Poland
- Died: March 2023 (aged 70) Poland
- Party: German: Christian Democratic Union; EU: European People's Party
- Education: Humboldt University of Berlin
- Website: www.joachimzeller.de

Joachim Zeller (1 July 1952 – March 2023) was a Polish-born German politician who served as Member of the European Parliament (MEP) from 2009 until 2019. He was a member of the Christian Democratic Union, part of the European People's Party.

== Early life and career ==
Born in Opole, Upper Silesia, Zeller attended the Humboldt University of Berlin. From 1977 to 1992, he was employed at the university library as a research associate. From 1996 to 2006, he served as mayor of the Berlin borough of Mitte.

== Member of the European Parliament, 2009–2019 ==
Zeller first became a Member of the European Parliament in the 2009 European elections. In his first term between 2009 and 2014, he served on the Committee on Regional Development. From 2014, he was a member of the Committee on Budgetary Control.

From 2009, Zeller served as a member of the parliament’s delegation to the EU-Russia Parliamentary Cooperation Committee. In 2014, he also joined the delegation to the ACP–EU Joint Parliamentary Assembly.

Zeller regularly monitored elections on behalf of the European Parliament. He was a member of the parliament’s 15-member monitoring mission for Ukrainian parliamentary elections in 2012, led by Pawel Kowal. He also took part in the following monitoring mission during the Ukrainian parliamentary elections in 2014, this time led by Andrej Plenković. He later represented the European Parliament in the OSCE/ODIHR international observation mission for the 2019 Moldovan parliamentary election.

In April 2018, Zeller announced that he would not stand in the 2019 European elections but instead resign from active politics by the end of the parliamentary term.

== Controversy ==
During the Azerbaijani presidential elections in 2013, Zeller participated in the official election observation mission by the European Parliament, led by Pino Arlacchi; the resulting report on the election was subsequently criticized as markedly kinder than the verdict of the Organization for Security and Co-operation in Europe, which found significant problems with every stage of the campaign, including intimidation of candidates and voters, the stuffing of ballot boxes, and intimidation of journalists.

In April 2012, Zeller was one of 28 EP politicians who voted against a move to restrict the export of information technology to autocratic regimes.

== Death ==
Zeller died in March 2023, at the age of 70.
