= Deike Janssen =

German politician (born 1996)

Member of the Berlin House of Representatives
- Assuming office 29 October 2026
- Succeeding: Laura Neugebauer
- Constituency: Mitte 7

Personal details
- Born: 1996 (age 29–30)
- Party: Die Linke (since 2021)

Deike Janssen (born 1996) is a German politician who was elected member of the Berlin House of Representatives in 2026. She has been a board member of Die Linke in Mitte since 2024.
