= Stephan von Dassel =

German politician

Stephan von Dassel (born 1967) is a German politician for the Alliance 90/The Greens and since 2016 'Bezirksbürgermeister' (district mayor) of the Berlin borough of Mitte. He is not part of the historical noble family von Dassel.

== Life and politics ==
Von Dassel was born in 1967 in the West German city of Münster and studied politics at the Free University of Berlin. Von Dassel entered the Greens in the 80's and became Bezirksbürgermeister of Berlin-Mitte in 2016. He was reelected in September 2021.
