= Geneviève Janssen-Pevtschin =

Belgian lawyer (1915–2011)

Geneviève Janssen-Pevtschin (24 February 1915 – 11 November 2001), also known Ginette Pevtschin, was a Belgian lawyer and the first woman magistrate in Belgium. She also was a distinguished member of the Belgian Resistance during World War II.

== Biography ==
Born in Brussels on 24 February 1915 to Belgian Jewish parents of Russian descent, Geneviève Pevtschin studied law and graduated from the Free University of Brussels in 1937. She was barrister at the Brussels Court of Appeal from 1937 to 1948. When war broke out, she was barred from practicing law, when the German Military Administration passed an anti-Jew decree on 28 October 1940 banning Jews from government and public service positions and from the legal profession. She decided to join the underground Belgian resistance group "Zéro". Within the group, Pevtschin helped transmitting messages to London, providing false identity papers and establishing contacts with other Resistance networks. Pevtchin was also instrumental in organizing the logistics for the publication of La Libre Belgique, one of the most notable underground newspapers published in German-occupied Belgium.

In the aftermath of the assassination of the collaborator Paul Collin, leading journalist and editor-in-chief of the Rexist collaborationist newspapers "Le Nouveau Journal" and "Cassandre", Pevtschin was arrested by the Gestapo on 21 May 1943. She was sentenced to six years of hard labor for her activities in La Libre Belgique and for her role in the Collin assassination. She survived torture, imprisonment and forced-labour in Nazi Germany. For her service during the war, she was made Officer of Order of the Crown with palms, awarded Military Cross and promoted to the rank of captain ARA (Intelligence and Action Agent).

After the war, she became the first Belgian woman magistrate when she was appointed judge to the tribunal of first instance in Brussels in 1948. She married Marcel Janssen in 1949. In 1954 she became the first Belgian member of the European Commission on Human Rights where she served until 1960. She was instrumental in the establishment of a permanent European Court for Human Rights in 1998.
