= Paula Janssen =

- Born: Paula Janssen Moura; January 19, 1996 (age 30); São Paulo, SP
- Genres: Alternative metal
- Occupation: Musician
- Instrument: Drums
- Years active: 2013–present

Paula Janssen Moura (born January 19, 1996) is best known for being the drummer for the alternative rock band Quimere.

== Biography ==
Paula is a Brazilian drummer, previously known for her membership of the band Los Compas, where she performed with bands like Kiara Rocks, Gloria and Forfun. Audiences for those performances were large, including four-thousand-six-hundred people in São Paulo.

When Los Compas disbanded, Paula was invited by her colleague Vitor Assan to join the alternative project Quimere, where she has been working since 2017.
