= Tim Janssen =

Dutch footballer

Personal information
- Full name: Tim Wilhelmus Janssen
- Date of birth: 6 March 1986 (age 40)
- Place of birth: Eindhoven, Netherlands
- Height: 2.10 m (6 ft 11 in)
- Position: Striker

Team information
- Current team: RKSV Nuenen

Youth career
- PSV

Senior career*
Years	Team	Apps	(Gls)
2004–2006	PSV	0	(0)
2005	→ Zwolle (loan)	11	(7)
2006	→ Eindhoven (loan)	16	(6)
2006–2007	RKC Waalwijk	30	(10)
2008–2009	NEC	35	(6)
2009–2011	Esbjerg fB	61	(23)
2011–2014	Midtjylland	51	(10)
2015	De Graafschap	6	(1)
2015–2016	Fortuna Sittard	5	(0)
2016	Oklahoma City Energy	3	(0)
2017–	RKSV Nuenen		

International career
2004–2005	Netherlands U19	6	(3)
2007	Netherlands U21	5	(1)
Medal record
Men's football
Representing Netherlands
UEFA European Under-21 Championship
Winner	2007 Netherlands
- * Club domestic league appearances and goals as of 3 October 2016

Tim Wilhelmus Janssen (born 6 March 1986 in Eindhoven) is a Dutch footballer who currently plays as a striker for RKSV Nuenen.

== Career ==
He made his debut in the professional football squad of FC Zwolle in the 2004–05 season. He also played for FC Eindhoven before joining RKC Waalwijk.

In 2007 Janssen was called up by Jong Oranje coach Foppe de Haan to be part of his squad for the 2007 UEFA European Under-21 Football Championship where they qualified for the 2008 Summer Olympics. He scored his first and only goal for Jong Oranje to ensure that they won their final warm-up match against Poland before the competition. At the 2007 UEFA European Under-21 Championship, Janssen came on as a substitute and scored both penalties he took during the series (1–1, 13–12 after 32 penalty kicks) in the semi-finals against England. The Dutch went on to retain their 2006 title by beating Serbia 4–1 in the final.

In 2017, Janssen played for RKSV Nuenen.

== Personal life ==
His father Willy Janssen was also a professional footballer.

== Honours ==
- UEFA U-21 Championship 2007
