= Bryan Janssen =

Dutch footballer (born 1995)

Personal information
- Date of birth: 9 January 1995 (age 31)
- Place of birth: Hook of Holland, Netherlands
- Height: 1.97 m (6 ft 6 in)
- Position: Goalkeeper

Team information
- Current team: Westlandia

Youth career
- –2006: Westlandia
- 2006–2016: Sparta Rotterdam

Senior career*
| Years | Team | Apps | (Gls) |
| 2016–2018 | Jong Sparta | 15 | (0) |
| 2018–2020 | Dordrecht | 53 | (0) |
| 2020–2022 | ASWH | 44 | (0) |
| 2022–2024 | Kozakken Boys | 55 | (0) |
| 2024– | Westlandia | | |
- * Club domestic league appearances and goals as of 20:51, 22 November 2024 (UTC)

Bryan Janssen (born 9 January 1995) is a Dutch footballer who plays as a goalkeeper for Vierde Divisie club Westlandia.

== Career ==
From March 2018 to January 2020, he played professionally for Dordrecht.

From January 2020 to June 2022, Janssen played for ASWH. He signed with Kozakken Boys, starting summer 2022, after initially agreeing to continue with ASWH.
