= Willy Janssen =

Dutch footballer

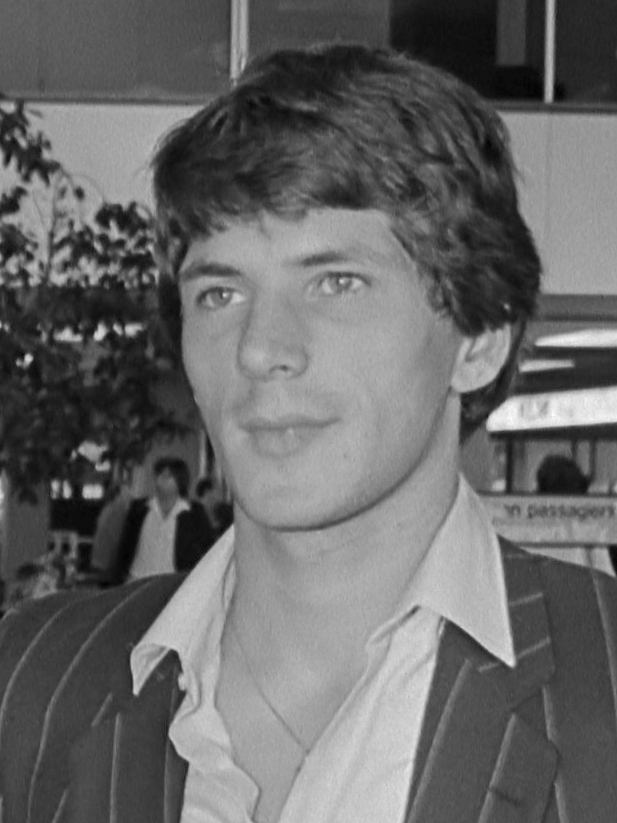
- Janssen in 1981.

Personal information
- Date of birth: 19 February 1960 (age 66)
- Place of birth: Sittard, Netherlands
- Position: Defender

Senior career*
Years	Team	Apps	(Gls)
1976–1981	PSV	40	(3)
1981–1984	NAC Breda	42	(6)
Total		82	(9)

International career
1981	Netherlands	1	(0)
- * Club domestic league appearances and goals

Willy Janssen (born 19 February 1960) is a Dutch former professional footballer who played as a defender.

== Career ==
Born in Sittard, Janssen played for PSV and NAC Breda. Janssen suffered from injuries during his career.

He made 1 appearance for the Netherlands national team in 1981. That game was a friendly match against Switzerland on 1 September 1981 which also saw the international debuts of Ruud Gullit, Frank Rijkaard and Wim Kieft.

== Later and personal life ==
Janssen later worked as a software developer. His son Tim Janssen was also a professional footballer.
