= Mitte =

- Borough of Berlin
- Flag Coat of arms

- Location of Mitte in Berlin
- Interactive map of Mitte
- Location within Germany Location within Berlin
- Coordinates: 52°31′N 13°22′E
- Country: Germany
- State: Berlin
- City: Berlin
- Subdivisions: 6 localities

Government
  - Mayor: Stefanie Remlinger (Greens)

Area
  - Total: 39.47 km^{2} (15.24 sq mi)

Population (2024-12-31)
  - Total: 364,530
  - Density: 9,236/km^{2} (23,920/sq mi)
- Time zone: UTC+01:00 (CET)
  - Summer (DST): UTC+02:00 (CEST)
- Vehicle registration: B
- Website: Official homepage

Mitte (German: [ˈmɪtə]) is the first and most central borough of Berlin. The borough consists of six sub-entities: Mitte proper, Gesundbrunnen, Hansaviertel, Moabit, Tiergarten and Wedding.

It is one of the two boroughs (the other being Friedrichshain-Kreuzberg) which were formerly divided between East Berlin and West Berlin. Mitte encompasses Berlin's historic core and includes some of the most important tourist sites of Berlin like the Reichstag and Berlin Hauptbahnhof, Checkpoint Charlie, Museum Island, the TV tower, Brandenburg Gate, Unter den Linden, Potsdamer Platz and Alexanderplatz. The latter six of which were in former East Berlin.

== Geography ==
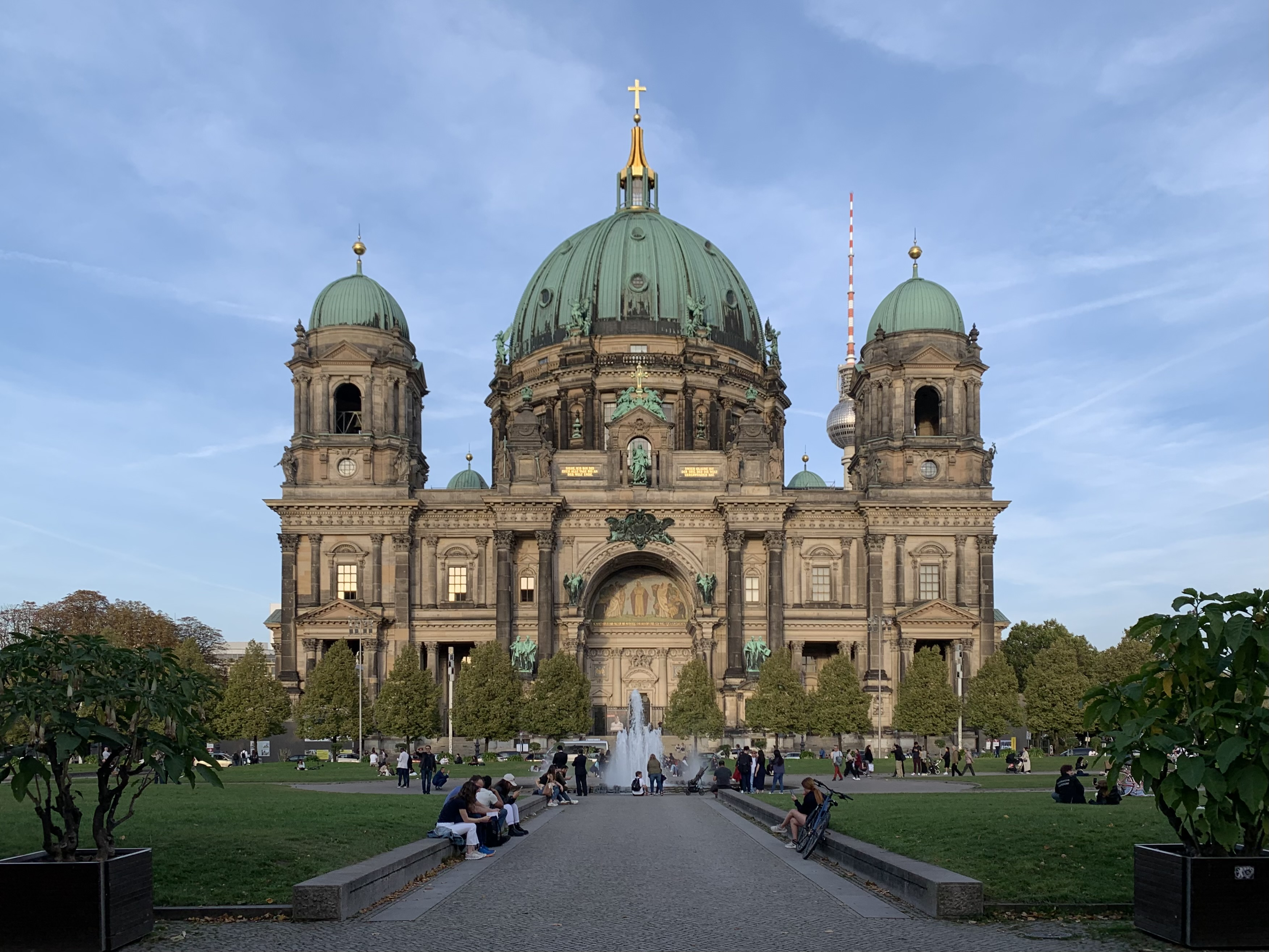
Berlin Cathedral and Television Tower

Mitte (German for "middle", "centre") is located in the central part of Berlin along the Spree River. It borders on Charlottenburg-Wilmersdorf in the west, Reinickendorf in the north, Pankow in the east, Friedrichshain-Kreuzberg in the southeast, and Tempelhof-Schöneberg in the southwest.

In the middle of the Spree lies Museum Island (Museumsinsel) with its museums, Berlin Cathedral (Berliner Dom) and Berlin Palace (Berliner Schloss). A central square in Mitte is Alexanderplatz with the prominent Fernsehturm (TV tower), Germany's highest building, and the large railway station with connections to many subway (U-Bahn), tramway (Berlin trambahn), city trains (S-Bahn) and buses.

There are some important streets which connect Mitte with the other boroughs, e.g. the boulevard Unter den Linden which connects Berlin Palace with Brandenburg Gate and runs further as Straße des 17. Juni to the Victory Column and the centre of former West Berlin in Charlottenburg, or Karl-Marx-Allee from Alexanderplatz to Friedrichshain and the eastern suburbs.

== History ==
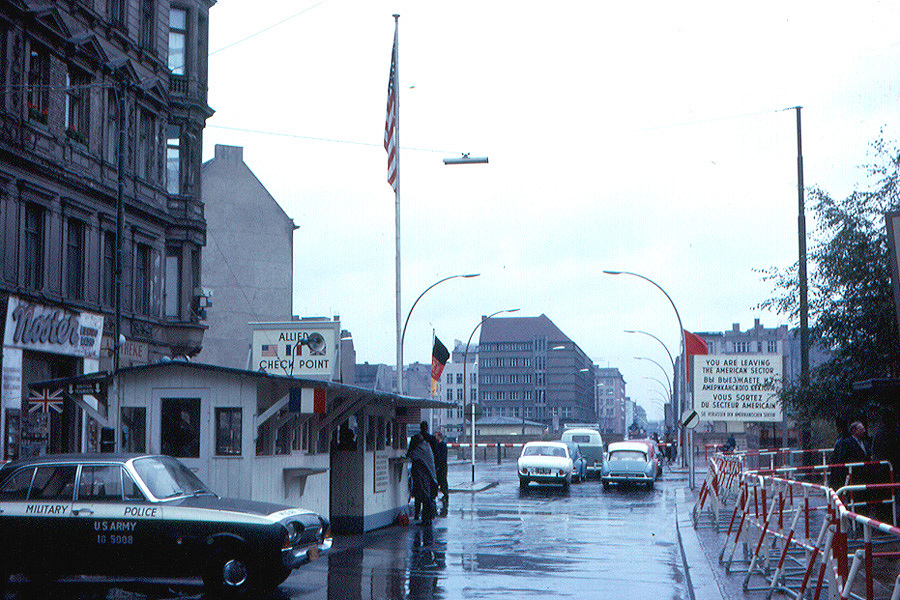
Checkpoint Charlie,1963

The former Mitte district had been established by the 1920 Greater Berlin Act and comprised large parts of the historic city around Alt-Berlin and Cölln. Brandenburg Gate was the western exit at the Berlin city boundary until 1861.

Between 1961 and 1990, the area's East Berlin portion was surrounded by the Berlin Wall on the north, south and west. There were some border control points, the most notable of which was Checkpoint Charlie between Kreuzberg and Mitte, which was operated by the United States Army and was open to foreigners and diplomats.

Two other checkpoints were at Heinrich-Heine-Straße/Prinzenstraße east of Checkpoint Charlie, open to citizens of West Germany and West Berlin and on Invalidenstraße in the north on the border with the West Berlin Tiergarten district (the present-day Moabit locality).

== Regierungsviertel (Government District) ==
The government district is located in the locality of Tiergarten around the Reichstag Building. Most institutions of the German government have their seat at the Regierungsviertel

- Bundestag, the German parliament in the old Reichstag Building
- Bellevue Palace, seat of the Federal President
- German Chancellery
- Offices of the Abgeordneten, members of the parliament, in the Paul-Löbe-Haus and the Marie-Elisabeth-Lüders-Haus
- Federal Ministry of the Interior
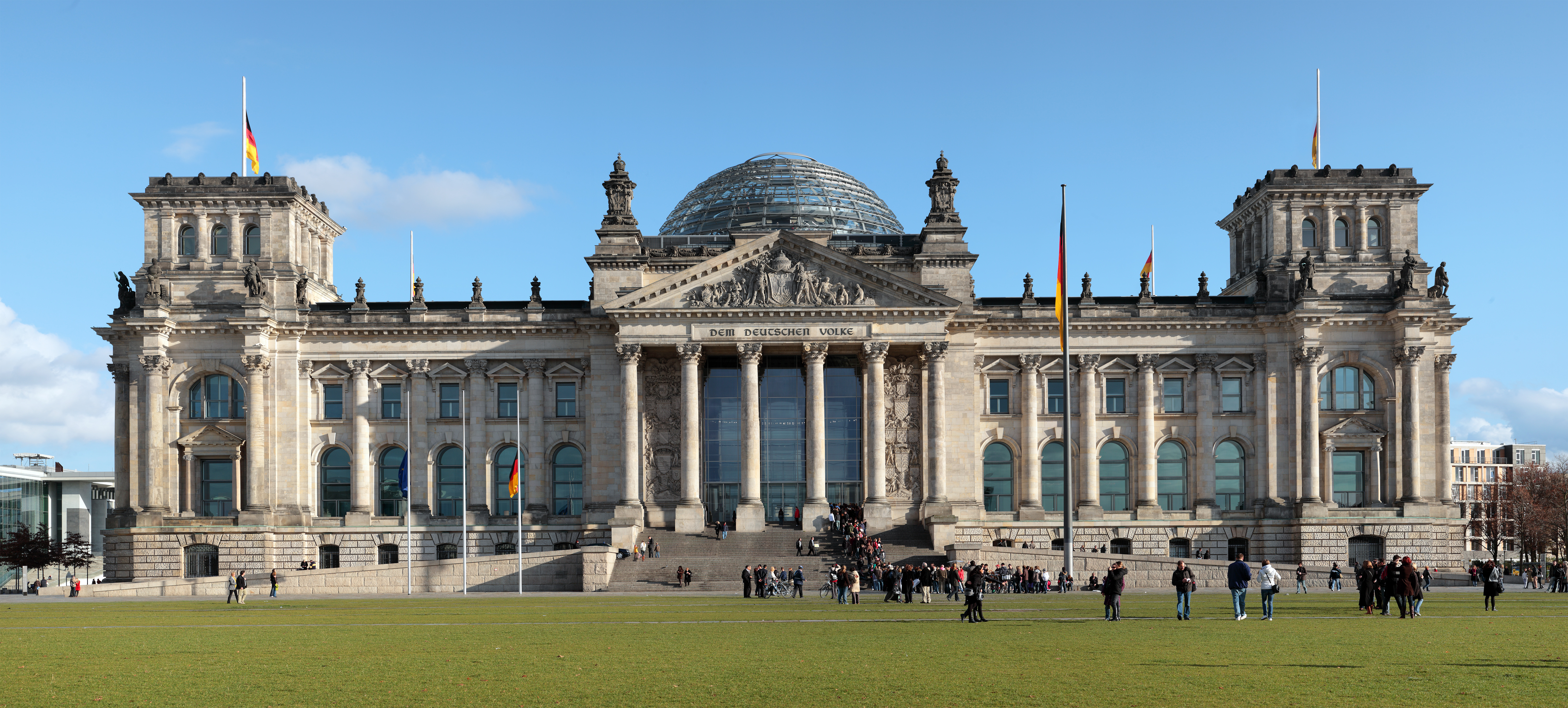
Reichstag Building

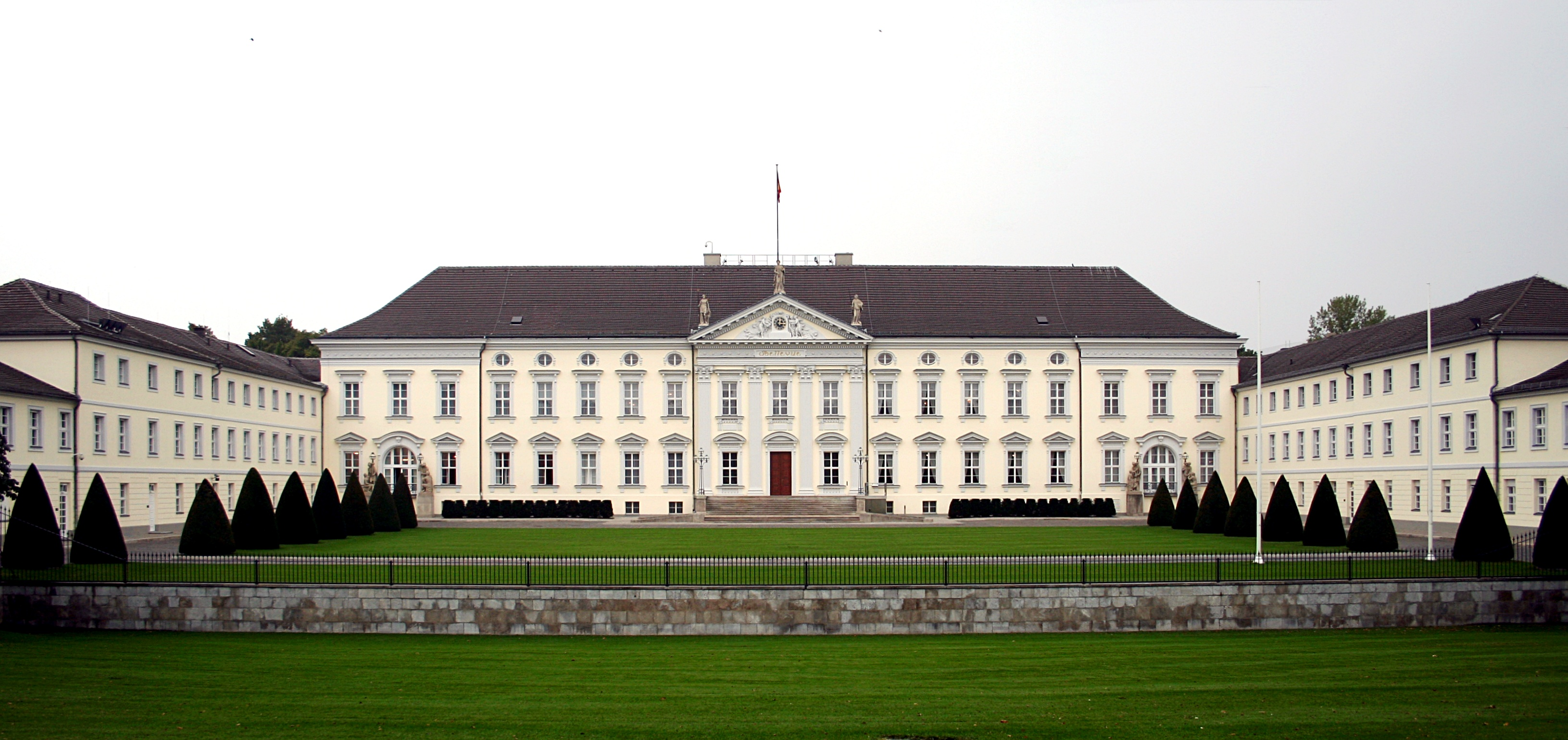
Bellevue Palace

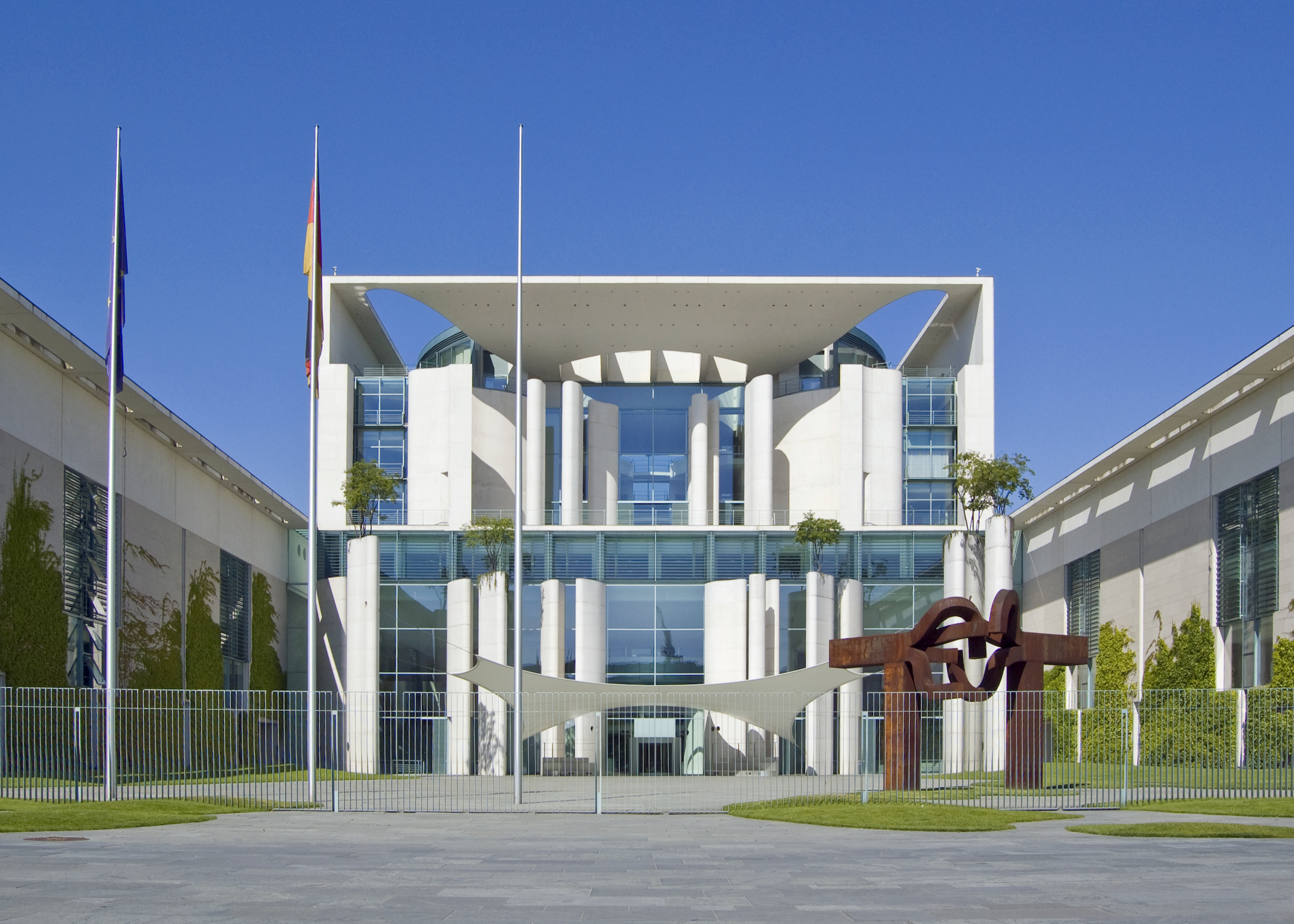
German Chancellery

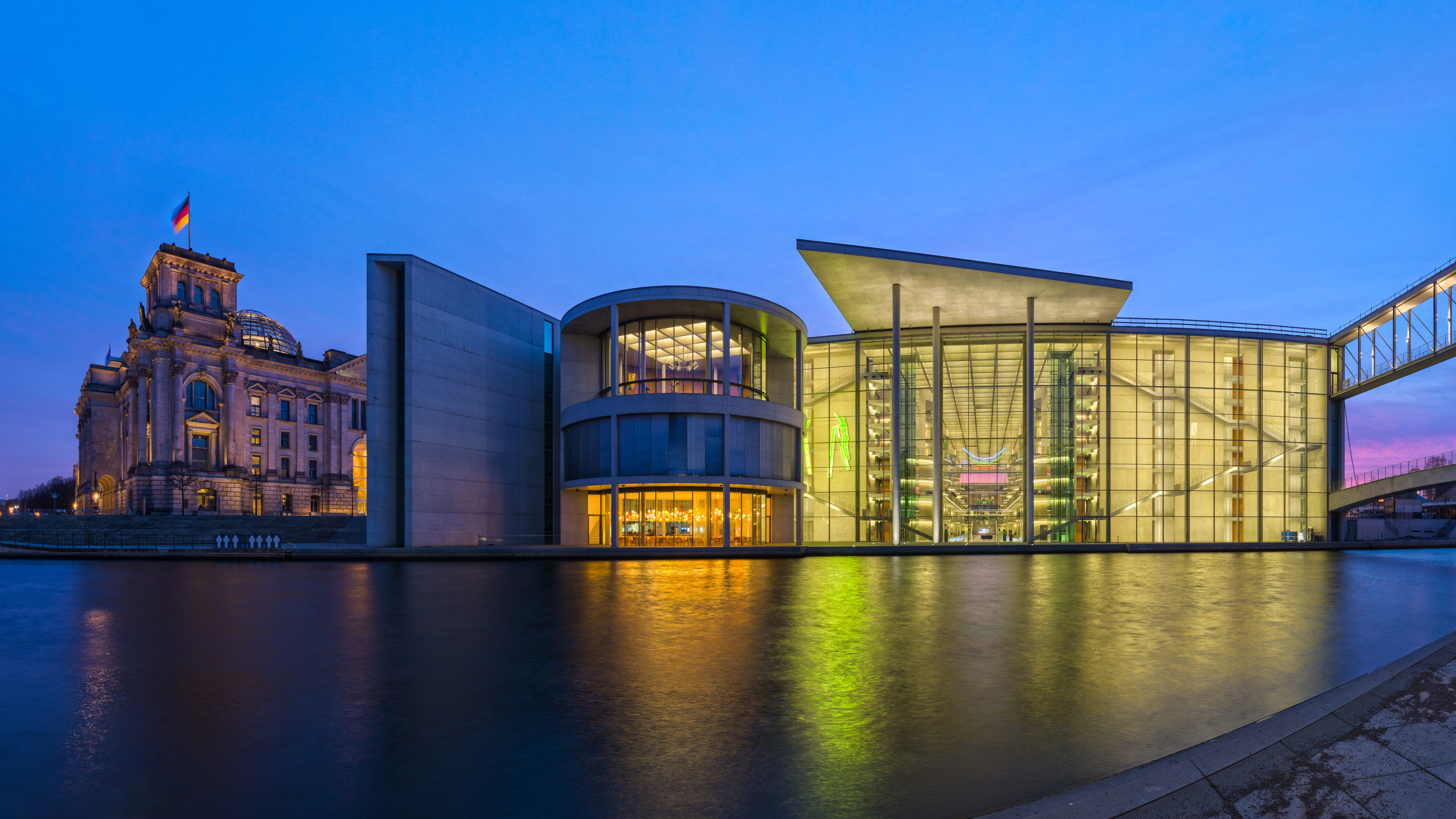
Paul-Löbe-Haus

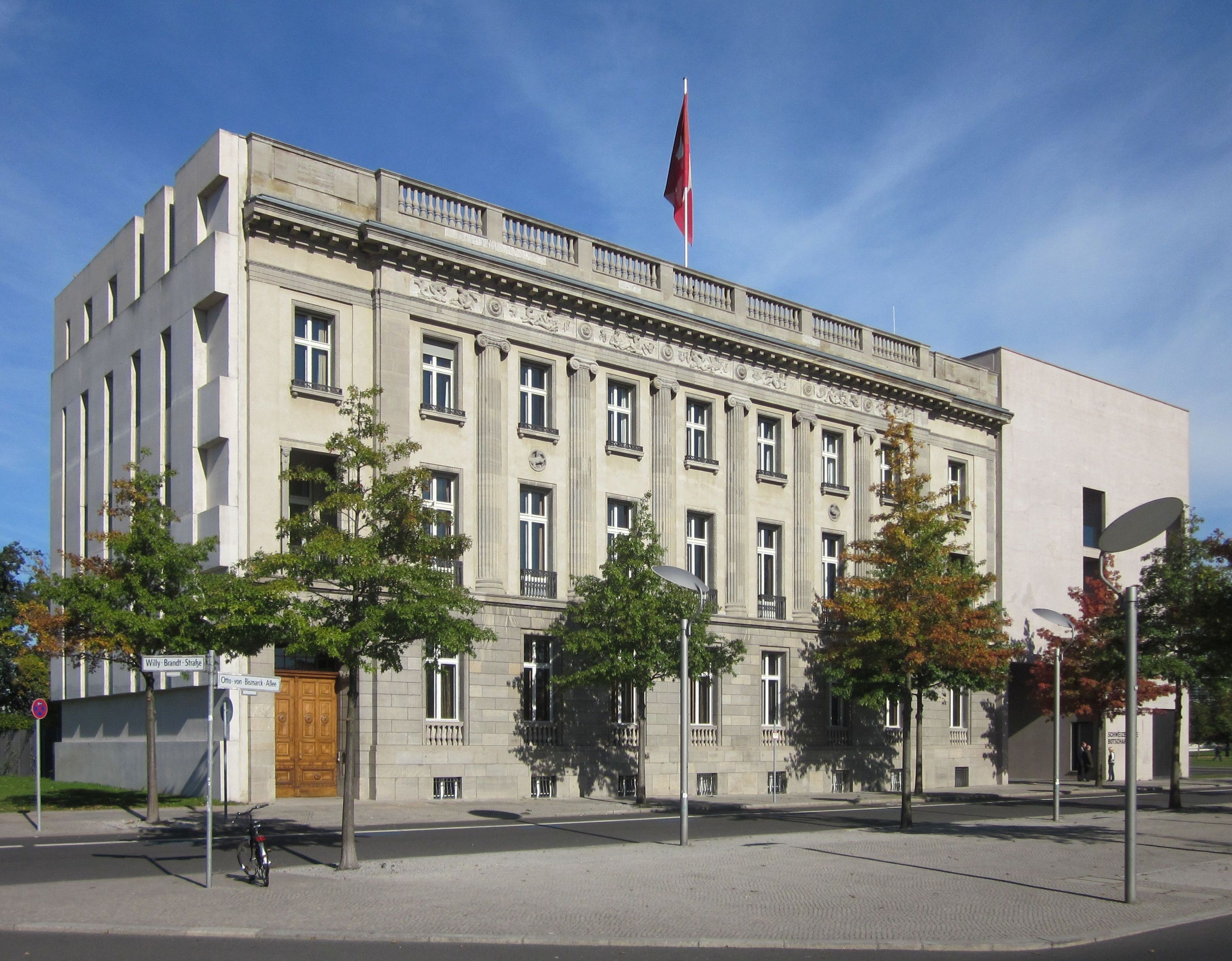
Swiss Embassy

== Historische Mitte (Historic center) ==
The historic center is located in the locality of Mitte proper around the Berlin Palace.

- Berlin Palace / Humboldt Forum
- Berlin Cathedral
- Museum Island
- Nikolaiviertel
- Gendarmenmarkt
- Unter den Linden
- Brandenburg Gate
- Fotografiska Berlin
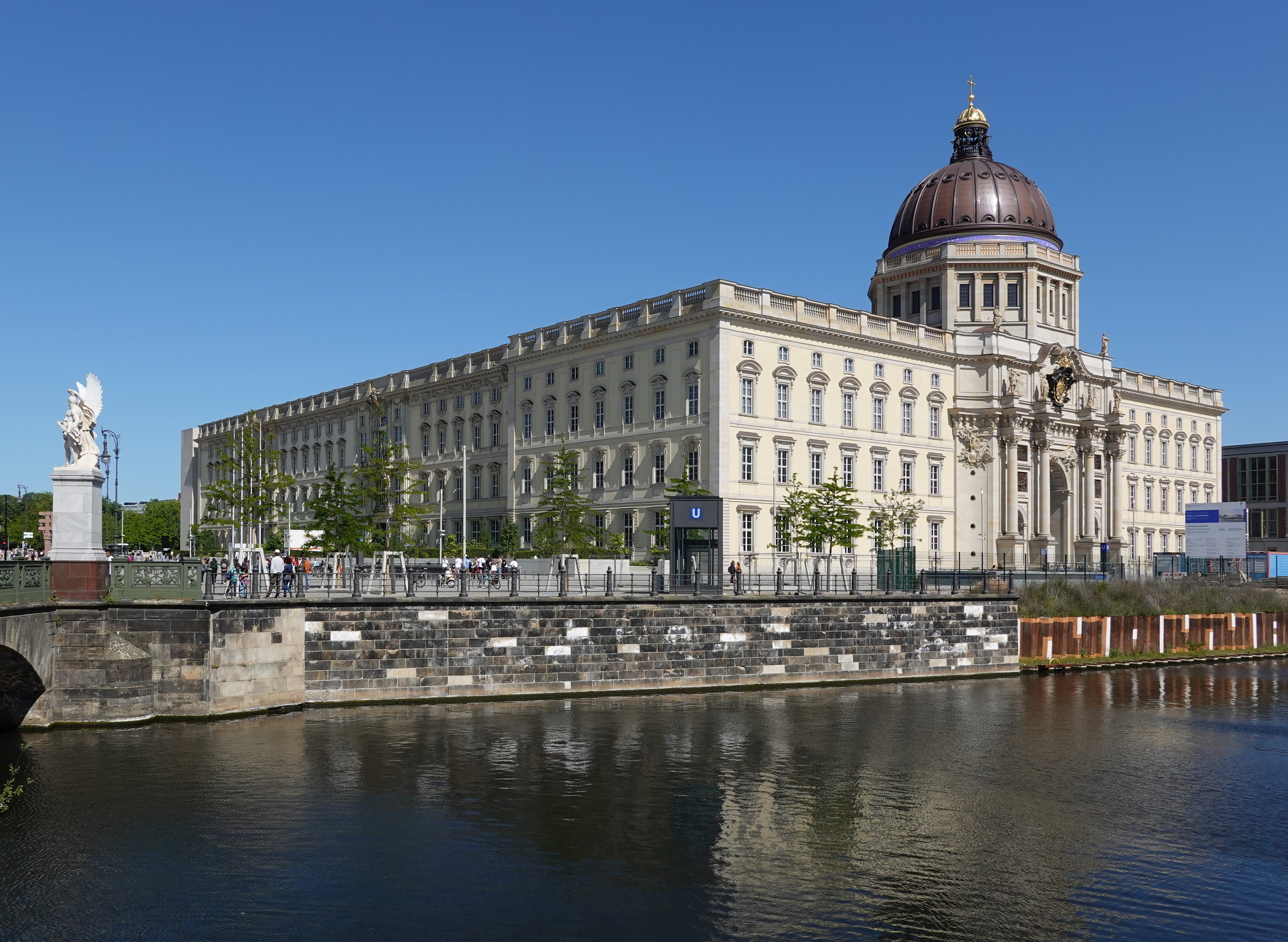
Berlin Palace / Humboldt Forum

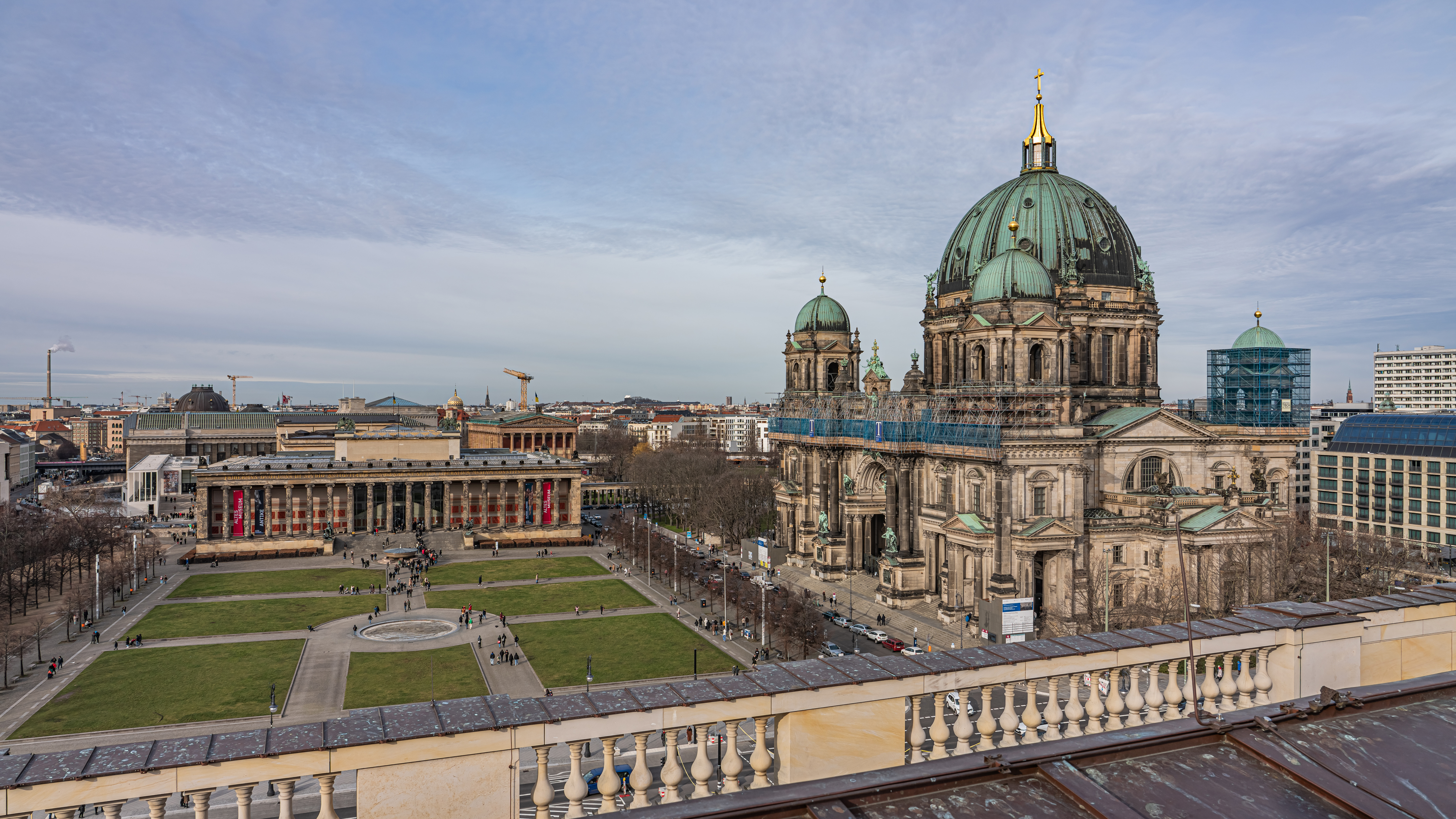
Altes Museum and Berlin Cathedral on Museum Island

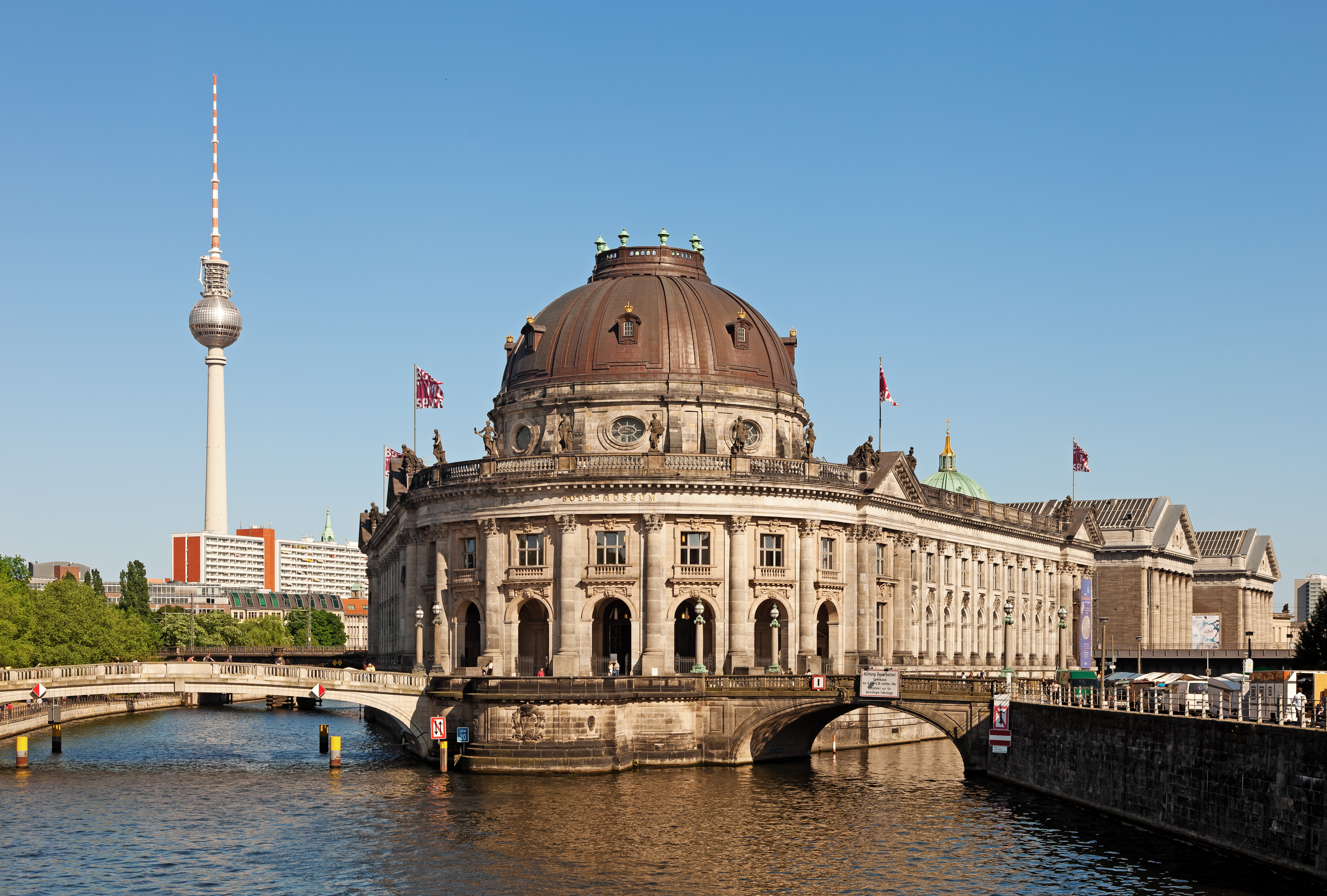
Bode Museum on Museum Island

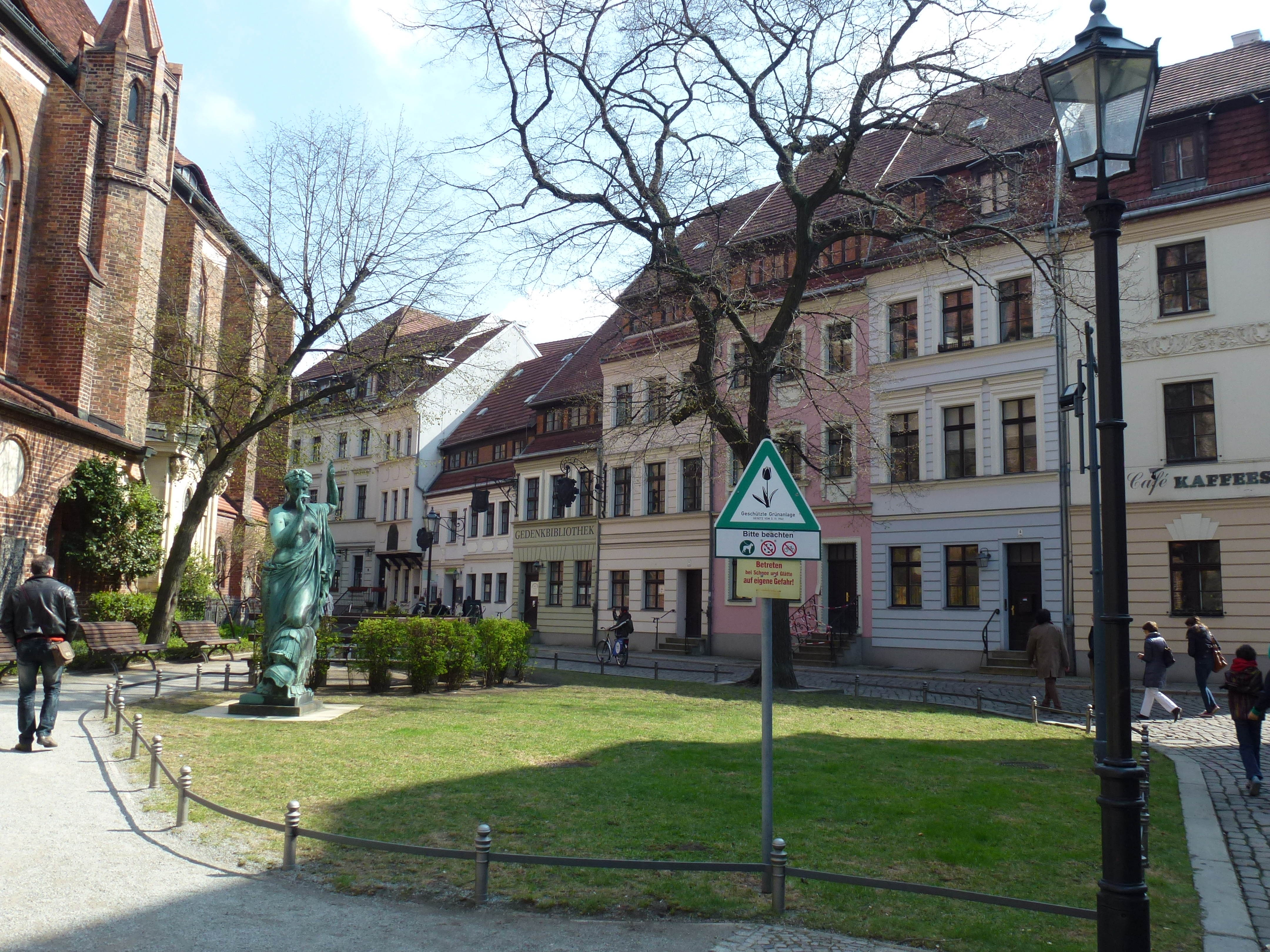
Nikolaiviertel

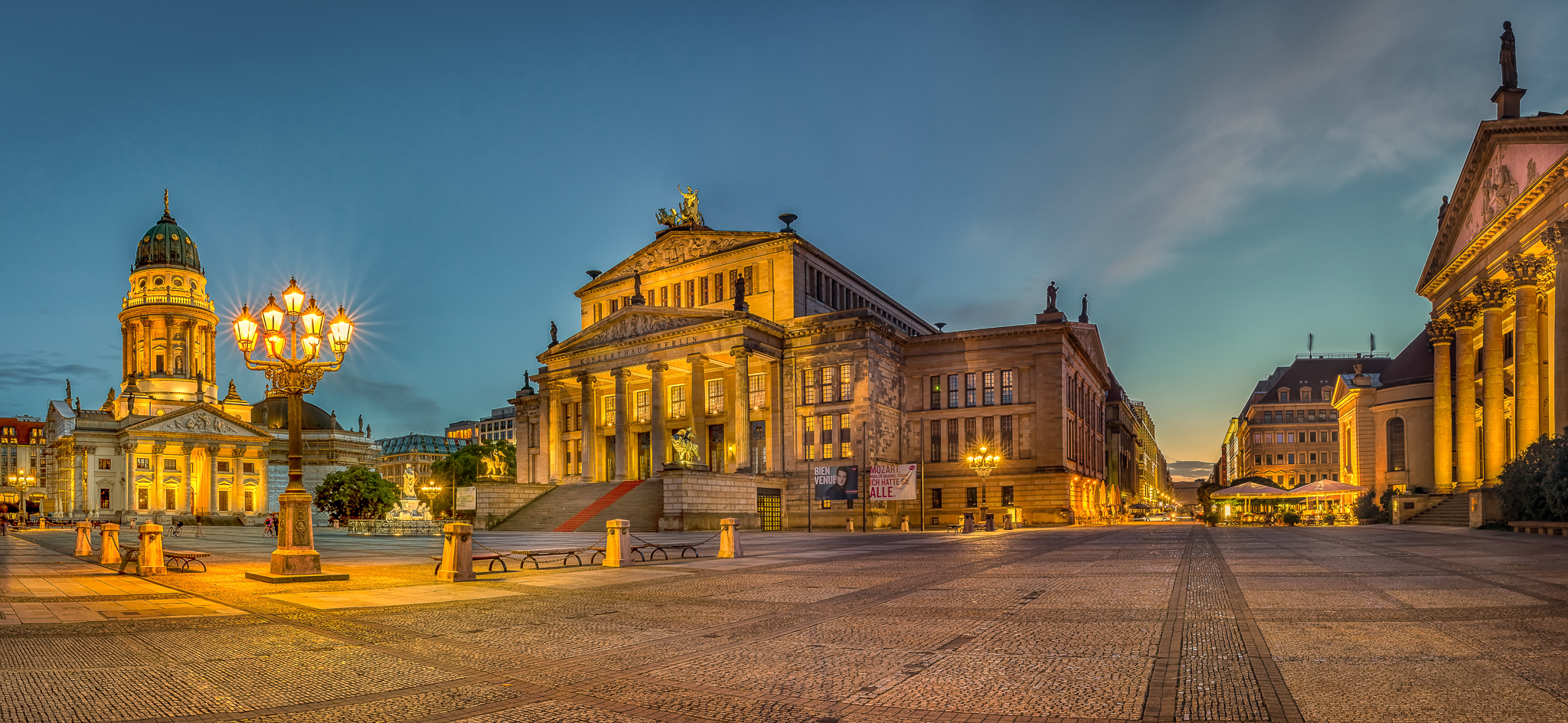
Gendarmenmarkt

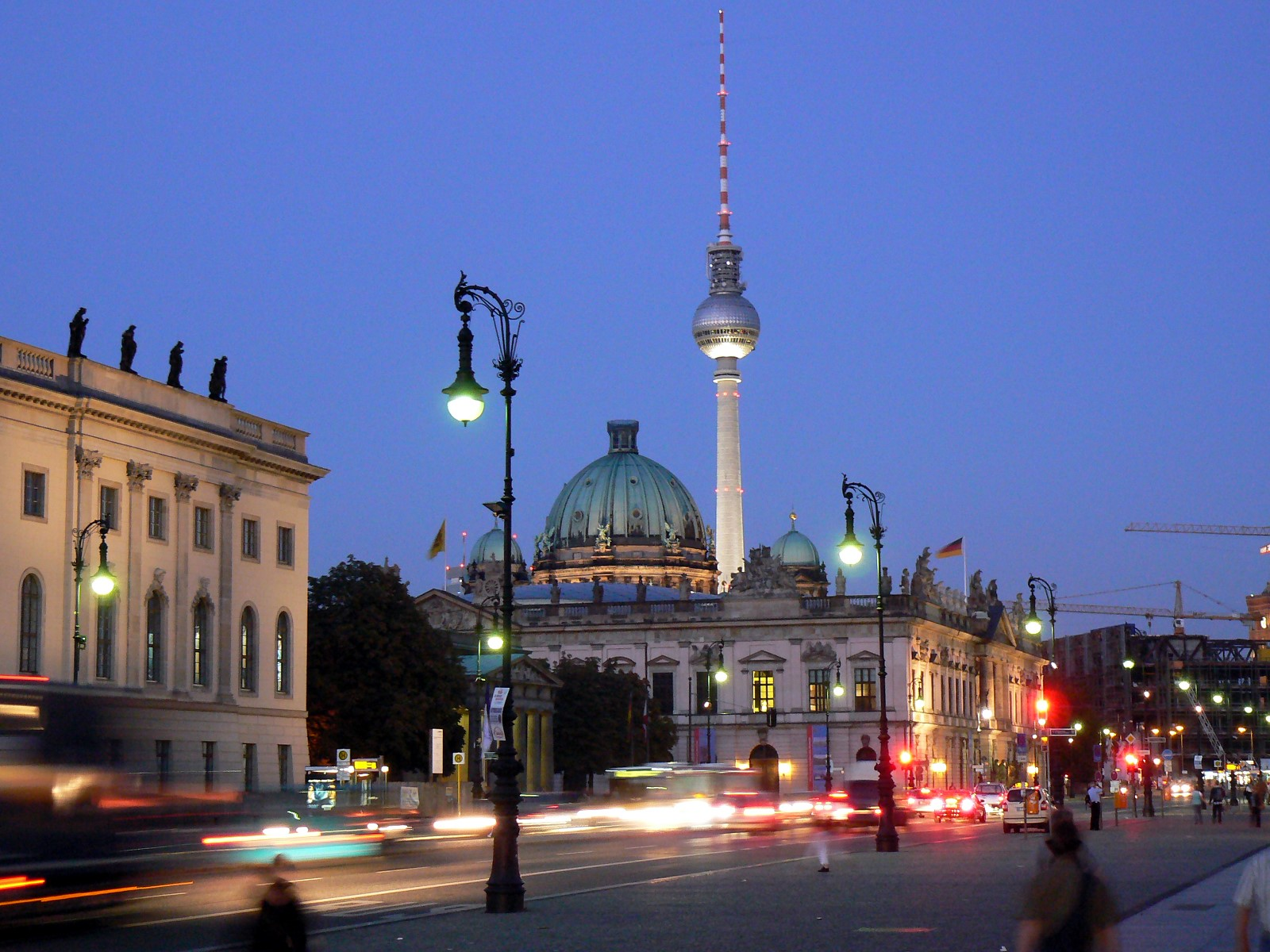
Unter den Linden

Brandenburg Gate

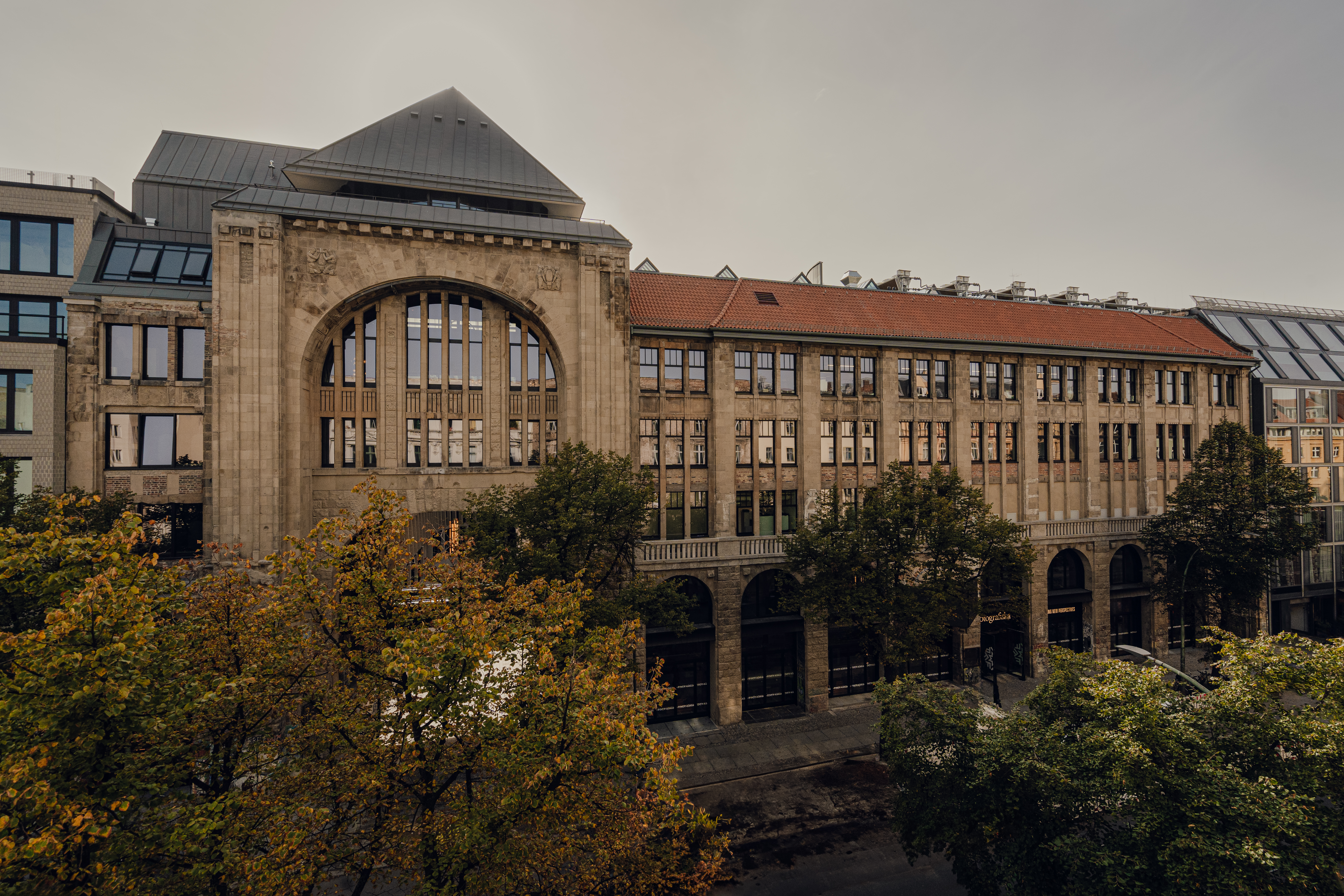
Fotografiska Berlin

== Botschaftsviertel (Embassy Quarter) ==
Many embassies and the Federal Ministry of Defence in the historic embassy quarter in the south of the Tiergarten Park.

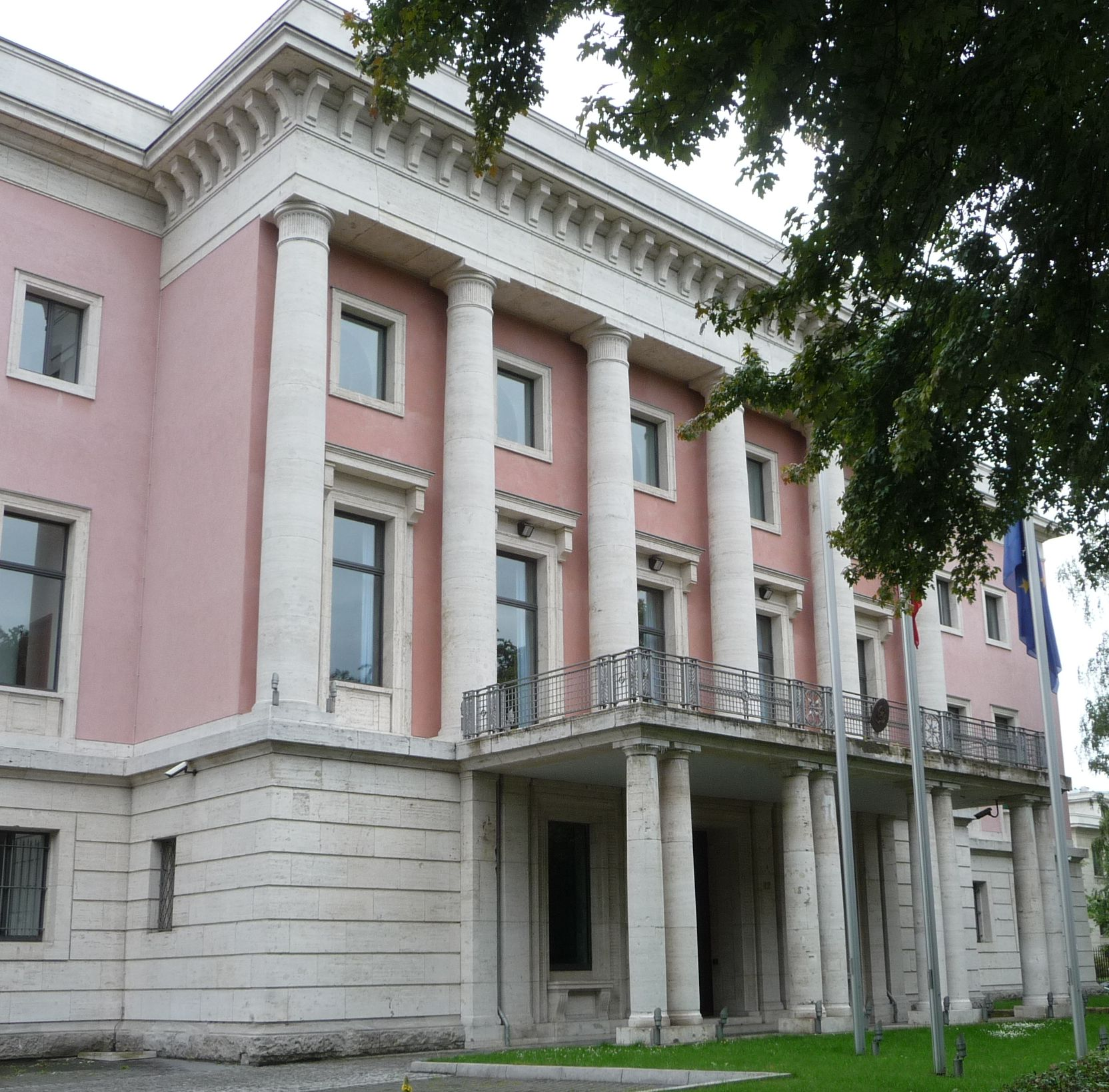
Italian Embassy

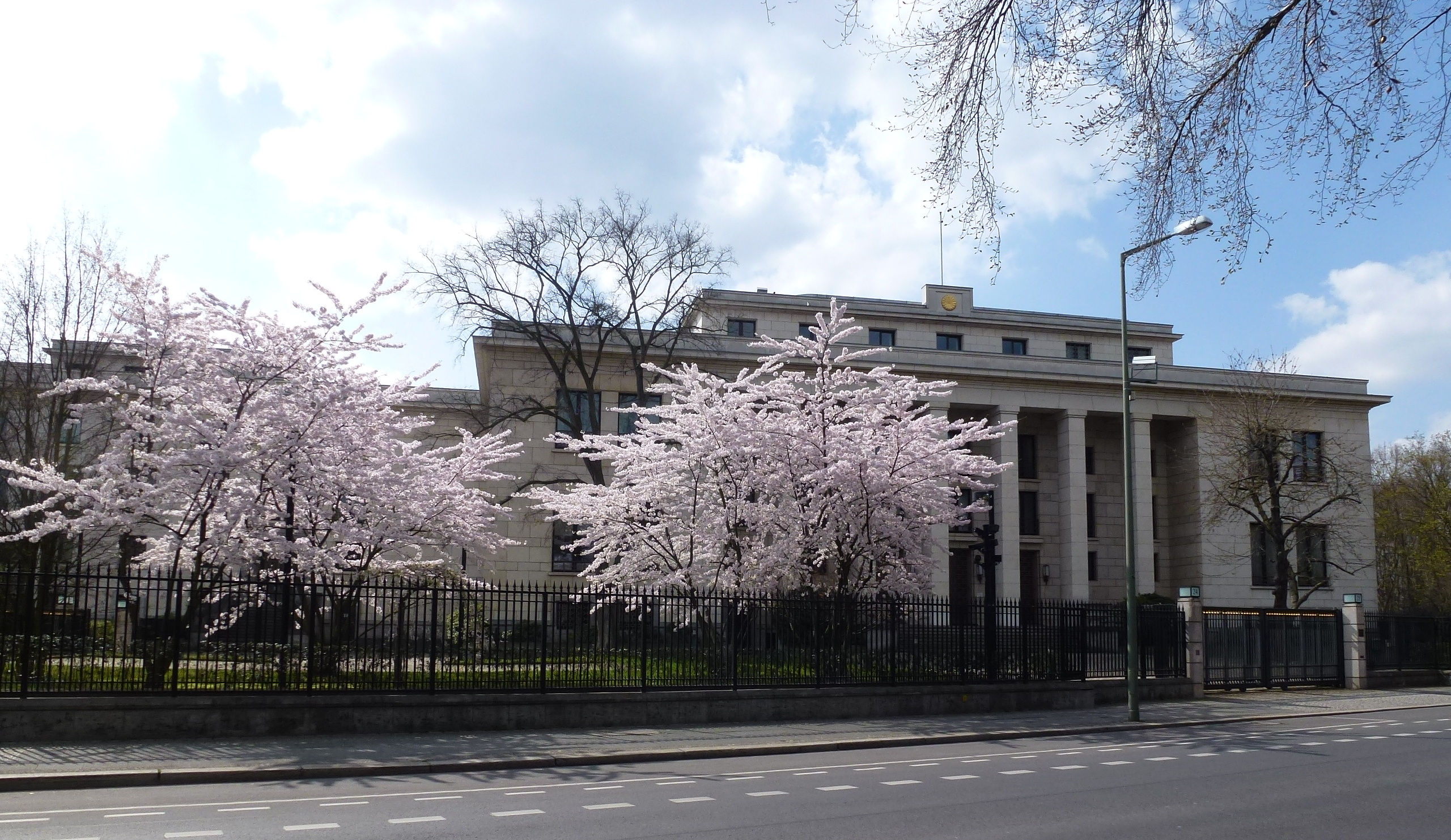
Japanese Embassy

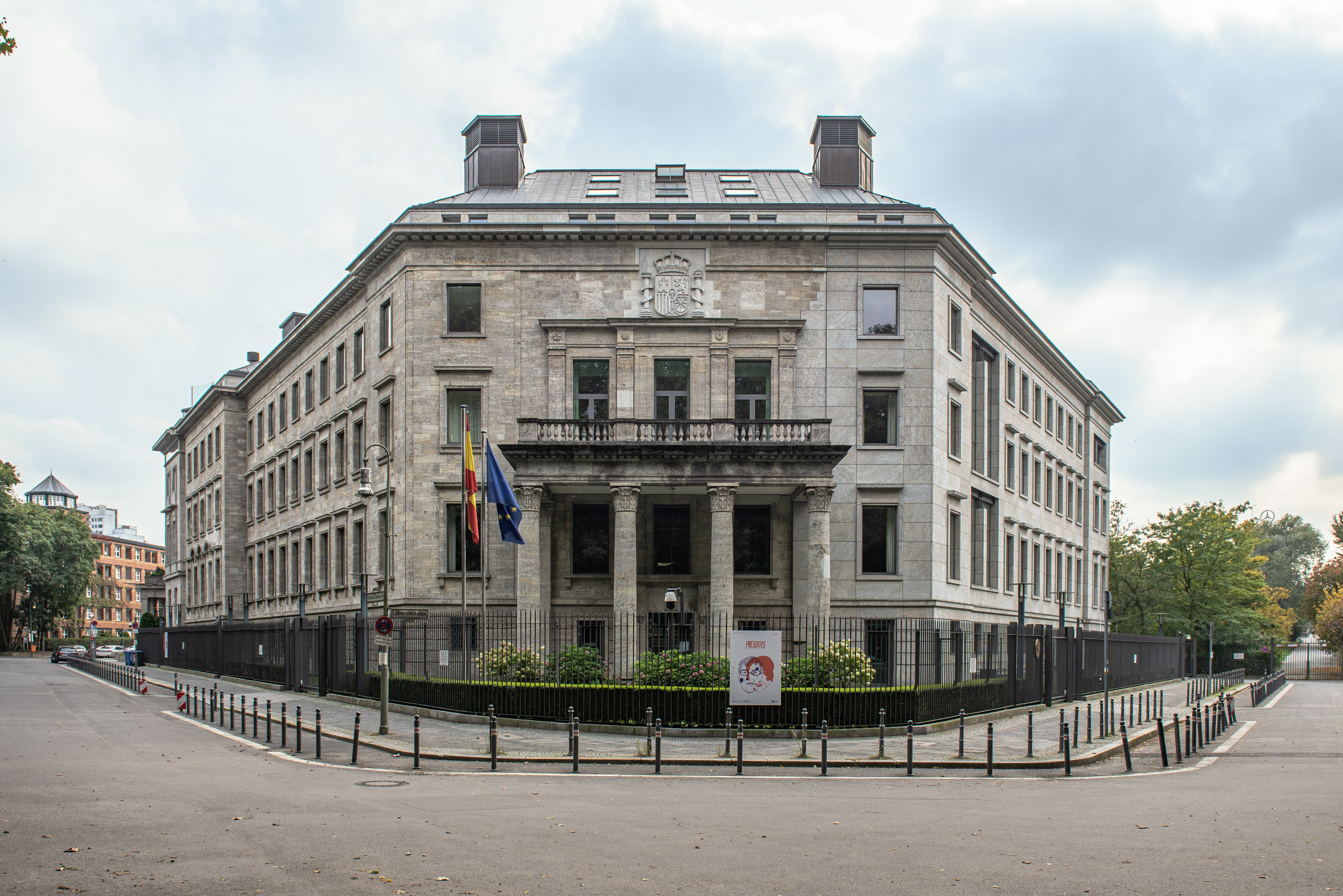
Spanish Embassy

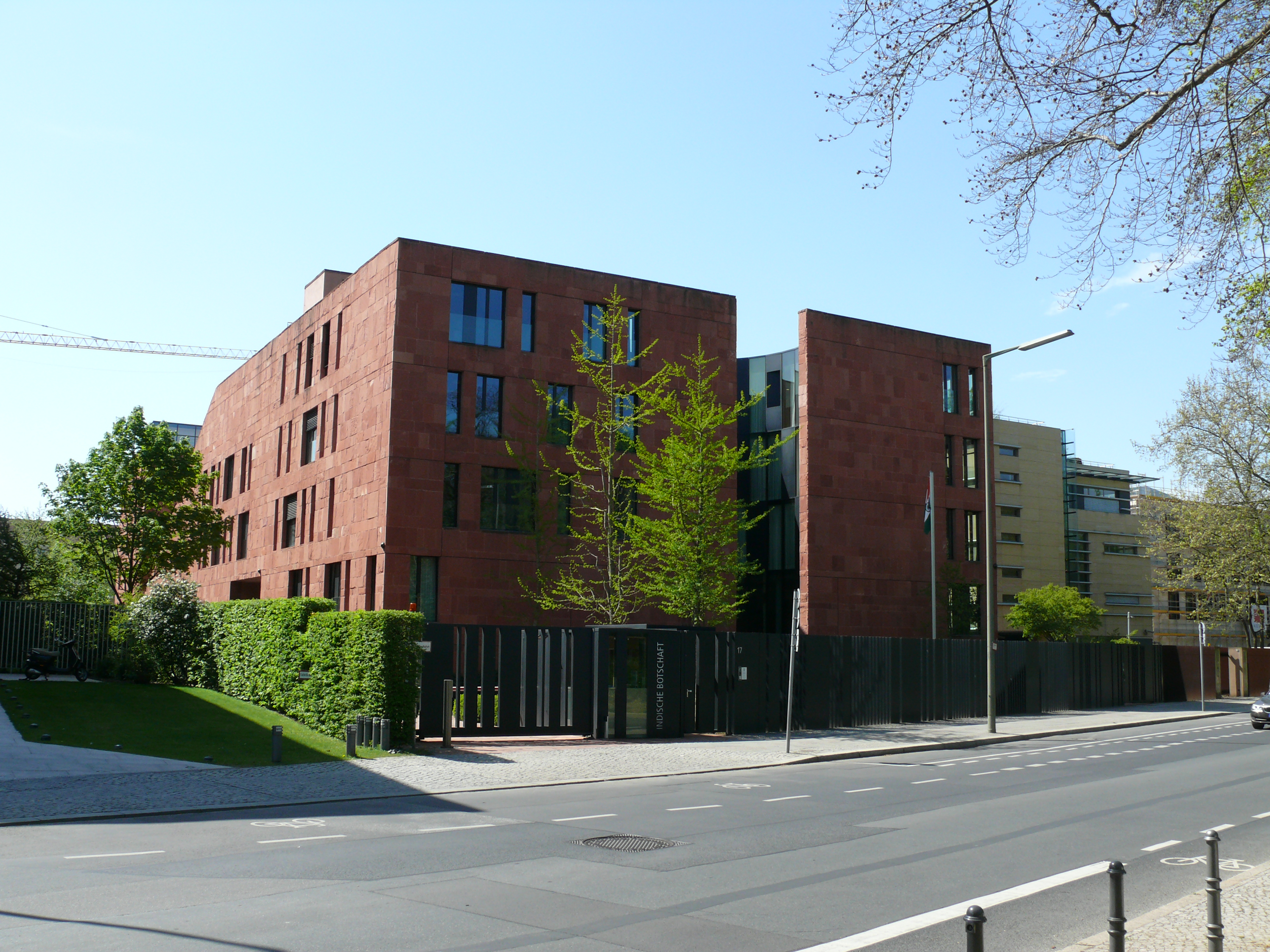
Indian Embassy

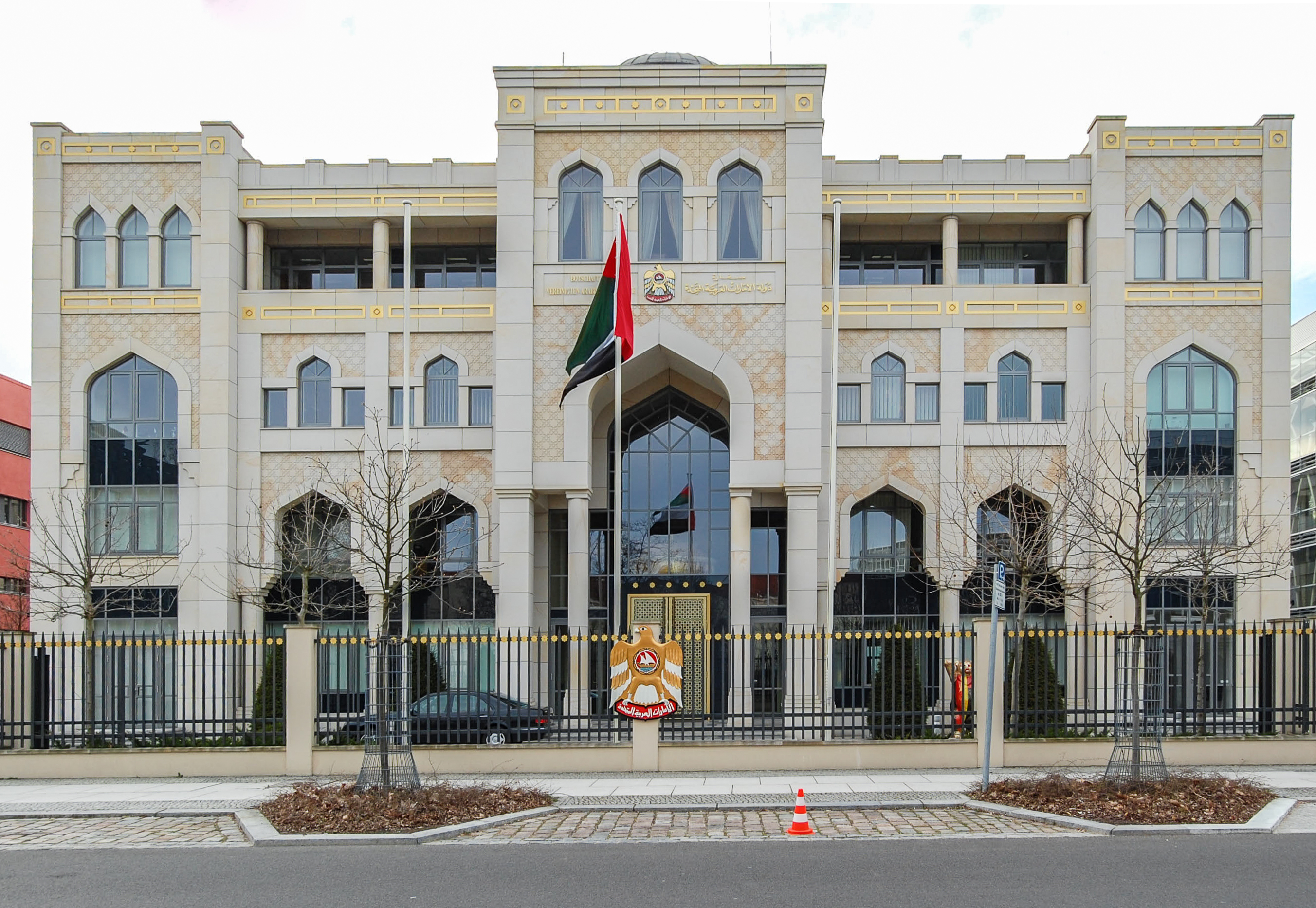
Embassy of the United Arab Emirates

== Tiergarten Park ==
Großer Tiergarten is the name of the biggest urban park in Mitte, located in the same-named locality. Tiergarten Park was established as a hunting ground in the 16th century by the Prussian kings. Today it is enclosed by densely built-up areas by Hansaviertel and Moabit in the north, the Government District in the east and the City West and the Embassy Quarter in the southwest.

Many cultural monuments and memorials are located in the Tiergarten Park, like the Siegessäule, the Soviet War Memorial and a historic rose garden. The Memorial to the Murdered Jews of Europe, the biggest victim group of the Nazi dictatorship, is located on the east side of the park, near the Brandenburg Gate and near the place where Hitler's New Reich Chancellery once was.

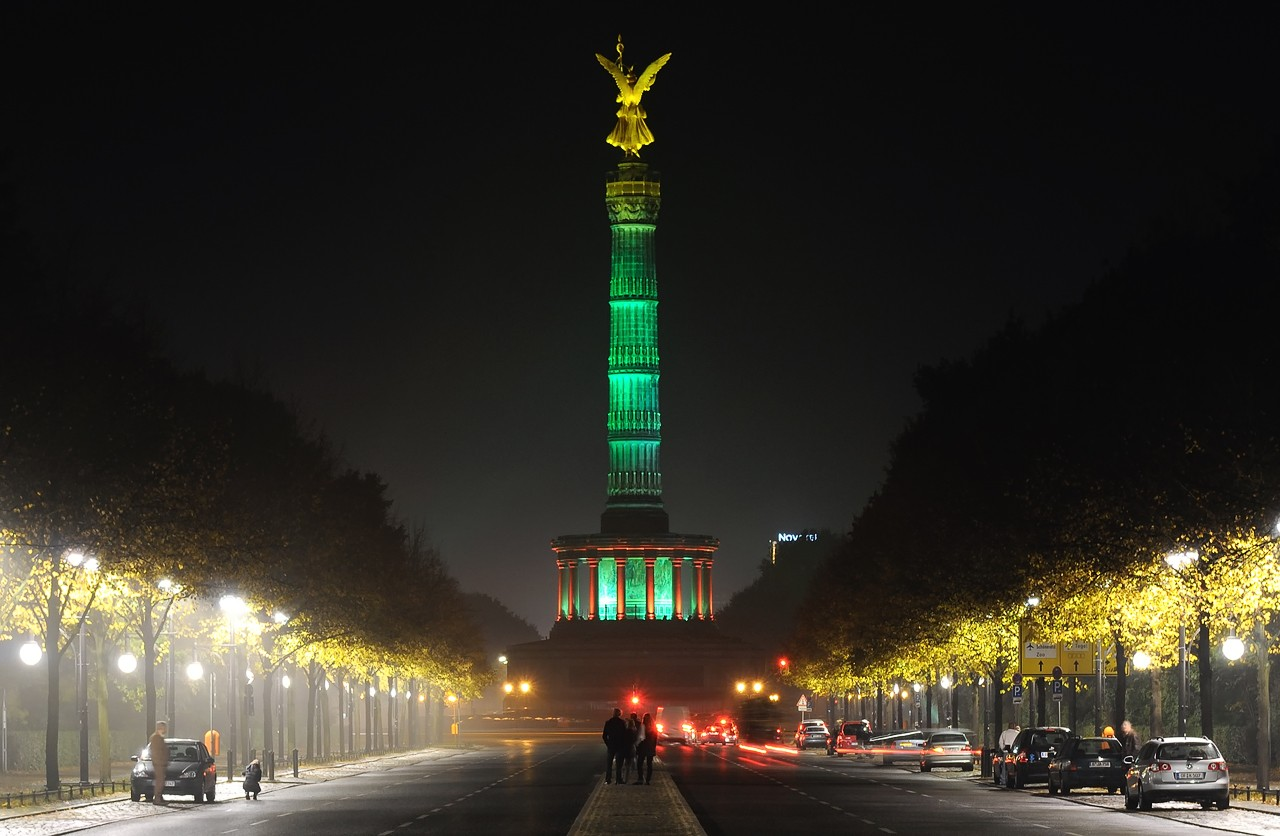
Siegessäule

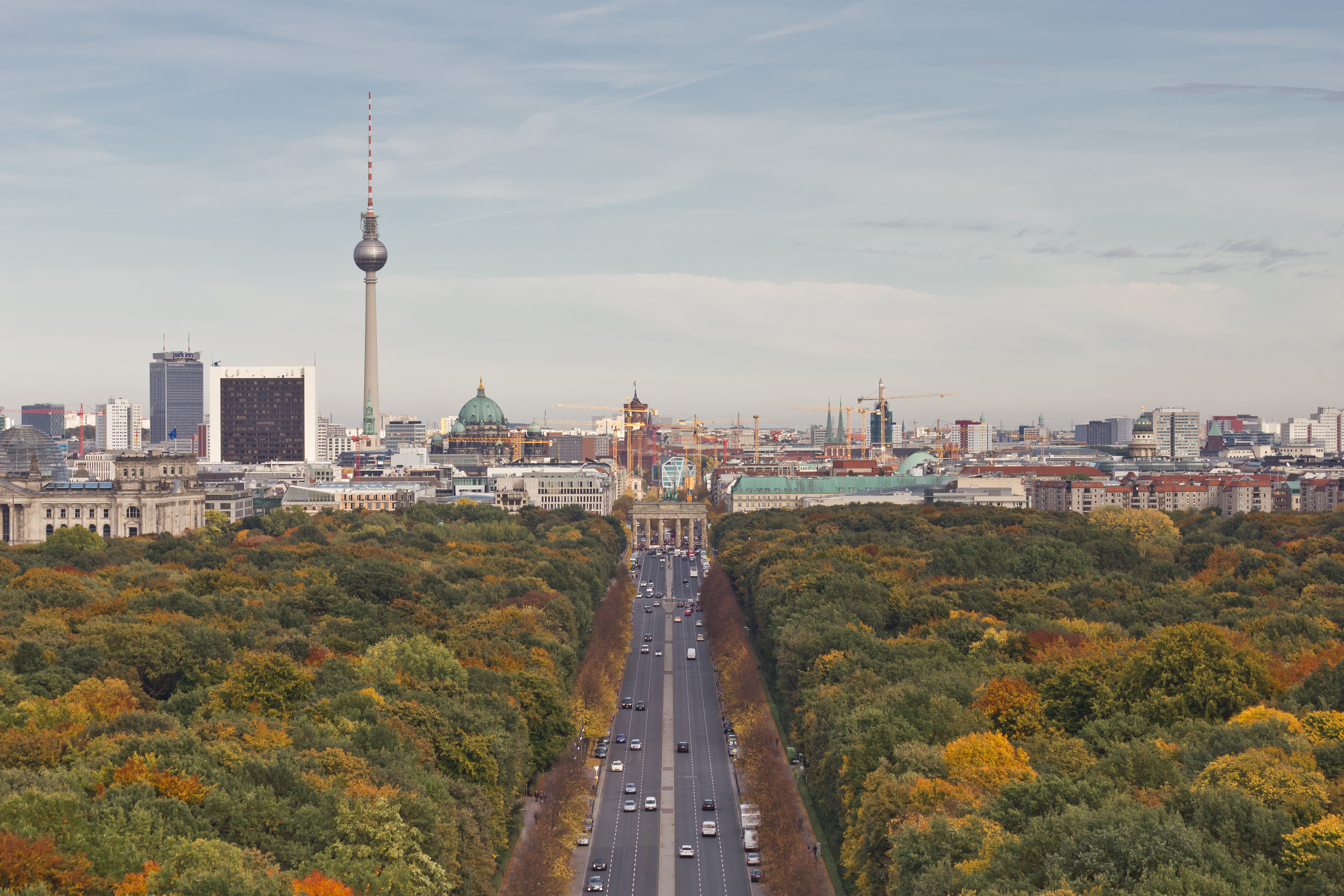
View from the Siegessäule to Brandenburg Gate

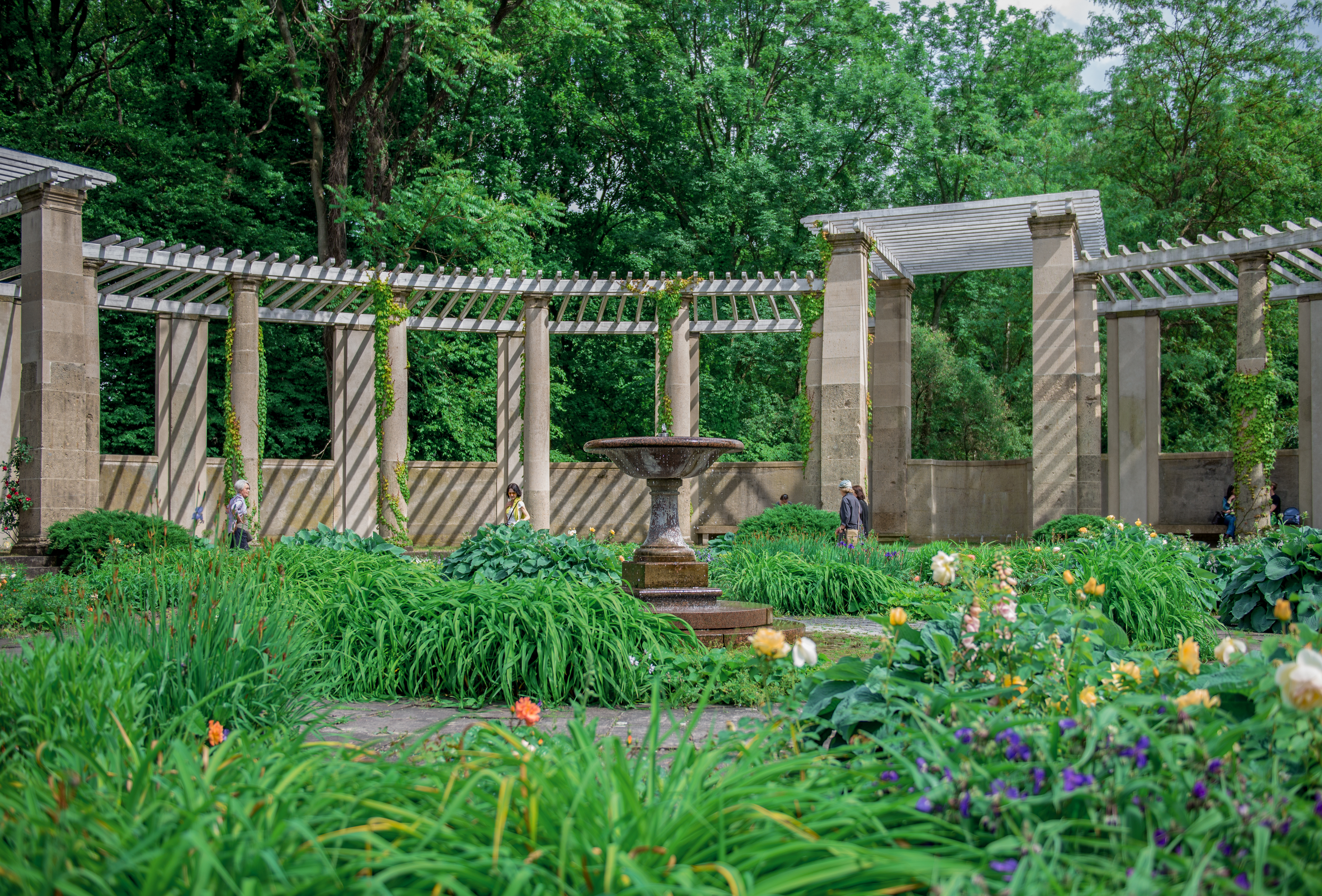
Rose Garden

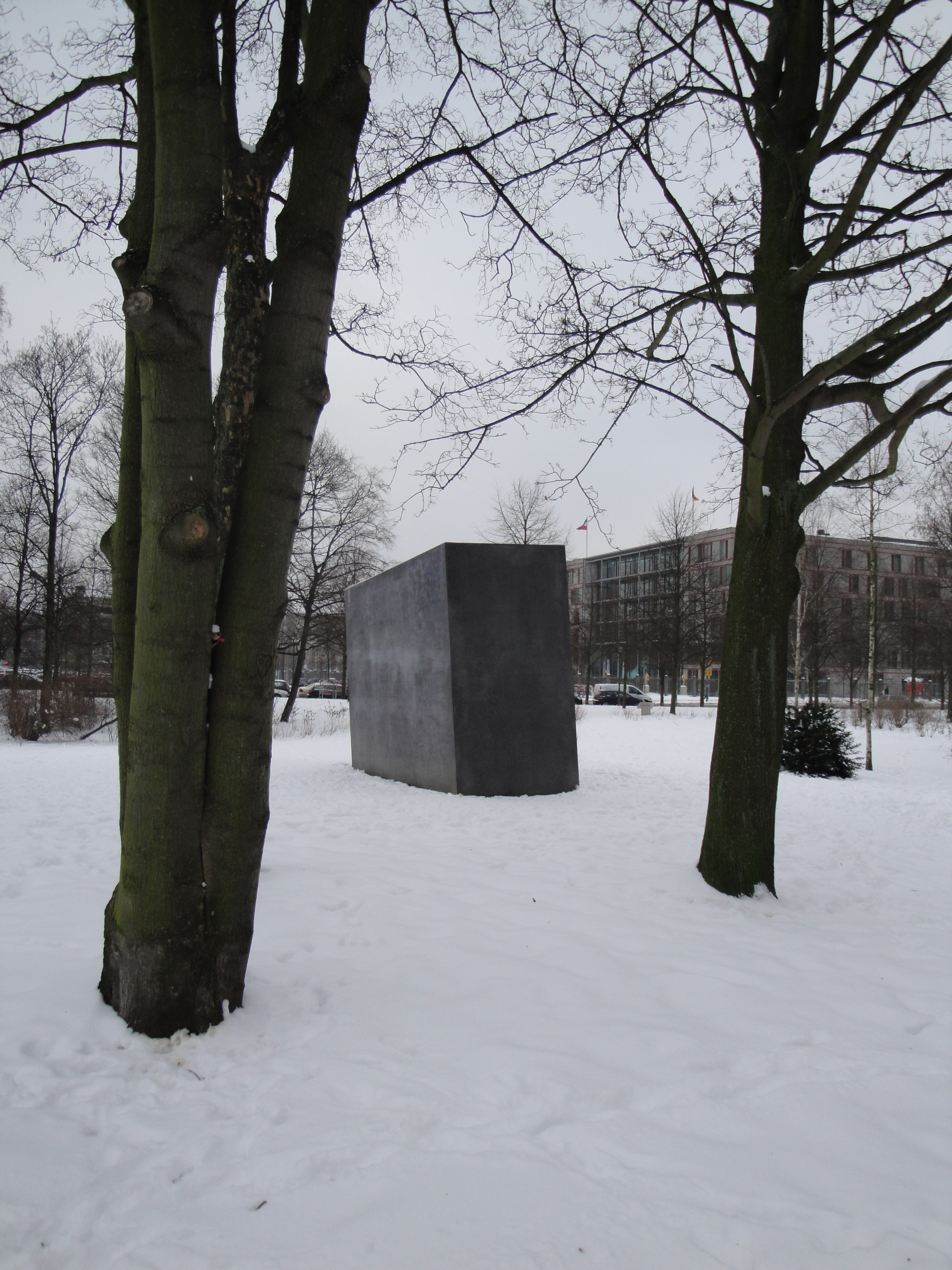
Memorial to Homosexuals Persecuted Under Nazism

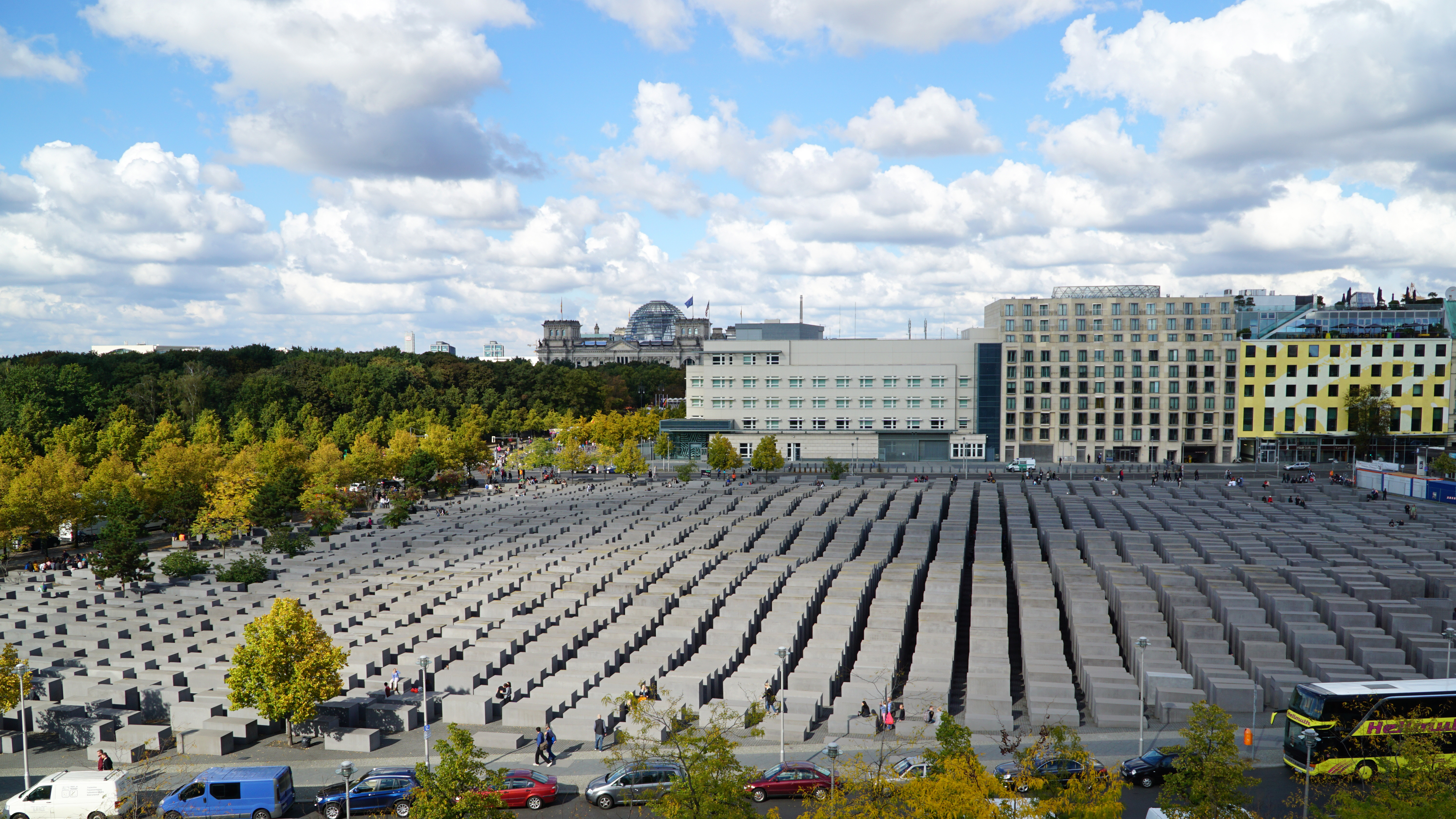
Memorial to the Murdered Jews of Europe

== Kulturforum ==
The Kulturforum was built in the 1950s and 1960s at the edge of West Berlin, after most of the once unified city's cultural assets had been lost behind the Berlin Wall. The Kulturforum is characterized by its innovative modernist architecture; several buildings are distinguished by the organic designs of Hans Scharoun, and the Neue Nationalgalerie was designed by Mies van der Rohe, albeit originally as a private house.

Among the cultural institutions housed in and around the Kulturforum are:

- Neue Nationalgalerie
- Gemäldegalerie
- Museum of Decorative Arts
- Musical Instrument Museum
- Kupferstichkabinett (Print room)
- Art Library
- Berliner Philharmonie
- Chamber Music Hall
- Berlin State Library
- Ibero-American Institute
- Wissenschaftszentrum
- St. Matthäus-Kirche

== In arts and literature ==
- Berlin Alexanderplatz, a 1929 novel by Alfred Döblin
- Mitte 1, a 2013 novel by Albrecht Behmel
- Berlin-Mitte, Norman Ohler
- Unter diesem Einfluss, Henning Kober

== Subdivision ==
Subdivisions of Mitte

The present-day borough of Mitte consists of six localities:

- Mitte

(the former Mitte borough)

- Moabit
- Hansaviertel
- Tiergarten

(the former Tiergarten borough)

- Wedding
- Gesundbrunnen

(the former Wedding borough)

== Demographics ==
As of 2010, the borough had a population of 322,919, of whom 144.000 (44.5%) had a migration background. In the former West Berlin areas of Wedding, Gesundbrunnen and Moabit, foreigners and Germans of foreign origin compose nearly 70% of the population, while in Mitte proper the share of migrants is relatively low. The immigrant community is quite diverse, however, Turks, Africans, Eastern Europeans and East Asians form the largest groups.

Percentage of people with migration background
Germans without migration background/non-migrants	55.5 % (184.000)
Germans with migration background, or Foreigners/Ausländer	44.5 % (144.000)
Muslim/Middle Eastern origin (Turkey, Arab League, Iran etc.)	18.0% (60.000)
non-German European origin (UK, Netherlands, United States, Russia, Poland, Spain, France etc.)	10.7% (35.400)
Others (East Asians, Vietnamese, Afro-Germans, Sub-Saharan Africans etc.)	14.5% (48.000)

== Politics ==
=== Borough assembly ===
The governing body of Mitte is the borough assembly (Bezirksverordnetenversammlung). It has responsibility for passing laws and electing the borough administration, including the mayor. The most recent borough assembly election was held on 26 September 2021, and led to a coalition between the Greens and the social democrats.

Coalitions and mayors in the borough assembly of Mitte
Legislative period	Borough Mayor	Coalition (Zählgemeinschaft)	Borough assembly seats of the coalition
2023-2026	To be confirmed	To be confirmed	To be confirmed
2021-2023	Stefanie Remlinger (Greens, 2022-2023) Stephan von Dassel (Greens, 2021-2022)	Greens and SPD	30/55
2016-2021	Stephan von Dassel	Greens and SPD	28/55
2011-2016	Christian Hanke (SPD)	SPD and CDU	28/55
2006-2011	Christian Hanke (SPD)	-	-
2001-2006	Joachim Zeller (CDU)	CDU, PDS, Greens	32/55

The 2021 results were as follows:

Party	Lead candidate	Votes	%	+/-	Seats	+/-
Alliance 90/The Greens (Grüne)	Laura Neugebauer	44,653	28.5	▲4.6	18	▲4
Social Democratic Party (SPD)	Ephraim Gothe	28,997	18.5	▼5.3	12	▼2
The Left (LINKE)	Christoph Keller	26,256	16.8	▼1.1	10	±0
Christian Democratic Union (CDU)	Carsten Spallek	20,088	12.8	▼0.7	8	▲1
Free Democratic Party (FDP)	Bastian Roet	10,419	6.7	▲0.6	4	▲1
Alternative for Germany (AfD)	Sabine Schüler	7,565	4.8	▼5.1	3	▼2
Volt Germany		3,668	2.3	New	0	New
Tierschutzpartei		3,410	2.2	New	0	New
Die PARTEI		3,358	2.1	New	0	New
dieBasis		2,193	1.4	New	0	New
Klimaliste		1,927	1.2	New	0	New
The Greys		1,112	0.7	New	0	New
Pirate Party Germany		919	0.6	▼2.9	0	▼2
Free Voters		903	0.6	New	0	New
The Humanists		602	0.4	New	0	New
Ecological Democratic Party		287	0.2	New	0	New
The Eligible		99	0.1	New	0	New
Valid votes		156,456	99.1			
Invalid votes		1,384	0.9			
Total		157,840	100.0		55	±0
Electorate/voter turnout		247,338	63.8	▲10.0		
Source: Elections Berlin

=== Borough government ===
The borough mayor (Bezirksbürgermeister) is elected by the borough assembly, and positions in the borough administration (Bezirksamt) are apportioned based on party strength. Stefanie Remlinger of the Greens was elected mayor on 20 October 2022. Since the 2021 municipal elections, the composition of the borough administration is as follows:

Councillor	Party	Portfolio
Stefanie Remlinger	GRÜNE	Borough Mayor; Staff and Finance
Ephraim Gothe	SPD	Deputy Mayor; Urban Development and Logistics
Stefanie Remlinger	GRÜNE	Education, Sport and Culture
Carsten Spallek	CDU	Social Affairs and Civil Service
Almut Neumann	GRÜNE	Order, Environment, Streets and Green Spaces
Christoph Keller	LINKE	Youth and Health
Source: Berlin.de

== Twin towns – sister cities ==
Mitte is twinned with:

- Beyoğlu (Istanbul), Turkey (2008)
- Bottrop, Germany (1983)
- Central AO (Moscow), Russia (2006)
- Chaoyang (Beijing), China (2004)
- Chiyoda (Tokyo), Japan (1994)
- Drøbak, Norway (1990)
- Higashiōsaka, Japan (1959)
- Holon, Israel (1970)
- Kassel, Germany (1979)
- Petrogradsky (Saint Petersburg), Russia (1994)
- Schwalm-Eder-Kreis, Germany (1992)
- Shinjuku (Tokyo), Japan (1994)
- Tourcoing, France (1995)
- Tsuwano, Shimane, Japan (1995)

== Gallery ==
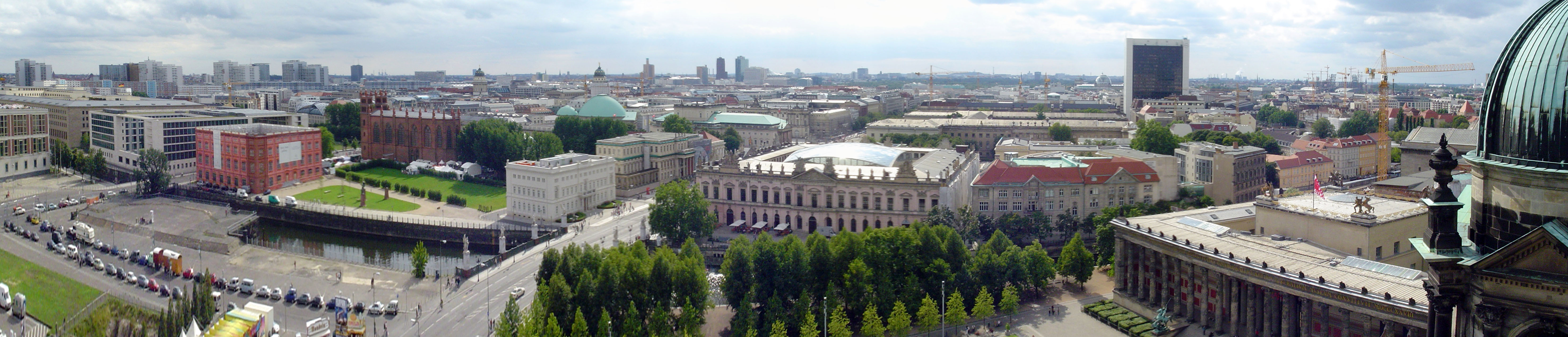
View over Mitte from Berlin Cathedral

== See also ==
- Berlin-Mitte (electoral district)
