= Martine Janssen =

Dutch swimmer

Personal information
- Full name: Martine Stephanie Janssen
- Born: 16 June 1977 (age 49) Dieren, Gelderland, Netherlands

Sport
- Sport: Swimming

Martine Stephanie Janssen (born 16 June 1977 in Dieren, Gelderland) is a former breaststroke swimmer from the Netherlands, who competed for her native country at the 1992 Summer Olympics in Barcelona, Spain. There she was eliminated in the heats of the 100m and 200m Breaststroke.
