= Ronald Janssen =

Belgian serial killer and rapist

- Born: Ronald Alain Janssen; February 6, 1971 (age 55); Boorsem, Limburg Province, Belgium
- Other name: "Le Prof"
- Conviction: Murder Kidnapping Rape
- Penalty: Life imprisonment

Details
- Victims: 3+
- Span of crimes: 2007–2010
- Country: Belgium
- Date apprehended: January 4, 2010

Ronald Alain Janssen (born February 6, 1971) is a Belgian serial killer who was sentenced to life imprisonment on October 21, 2011, for the murder of three people.

== Biography ==
Ronald Alain Janssen was born on February 6, 1971, in Boorsem, the third child in a family of four. His father was a miner and his mother was a housekeeper. From early childhood Janssen was teased at school for his lisp. His father was depressed and severe at the "tyrannical limit". At home, Janssen was terrorized by his father. This fear caused him to have insomnia, which he kept throughout his life. He allegedly tried to murder his diabetic father by injecting him with a liquid instead of insulin. His mother Hilda had a strong relationship with her son, which dated from the time that his father was brutal with the family. When Hilda decided to divorce, all four children chose to continue living with their mother. https://www.hbvl.be/binnenland/portret-van-een-moordenaar/30660174.html

He studied at Hasselt and Leuven. In 1993, he graduated as an industrial engineer with distinction. That year he also met his future wife Natalie.

In 1996, the couple moved to Genk, where Natalie found a job. After being active as a technical and production manager in a company in Genk, he turned to teaching in 1998. At Maaseik, he taught mechanics and computer science until 2000.

In the middle of 2000, he moved with his wife and daughters to Loksbergen. Janssen then became a professor at Herk-De-Stad where he taught computer science, economics, technology and applied mechanics.

His wife left him in 2006, leaving Janssen to live alone. While in Loksbergen, neighbours would sometimes find him walking alone at night while everyone was sleeping.

== The criminal case ==
=== Annick Van Uytsel (18) ===
Annick Van Uytsel, an 18-year-old Diest resident, was returning to her home alone while riding a bike on April 27 to 28, 2007. Threatening her with a knife, Janssen kidnapped her and took her to his home, where he killed Van Uytsel with a hammer, then held her head under water to make sure she did not survive. 70 police officers, 200 volunteers and a helicopter began searching for the woman. A telephone terminal was activated by Annick's GSM, and her mother called her while she was still at Janssen's, which allowed the police to work in a specific sector where 4000 men between 35 and 40 years were interviewed, but the killer still managed to slip through the cracks. Annick's body was found on May 3, 2007, in Lummen in the Albert Canal, weighted down with 14.5 kilos of stones. Her bike, partially repainted by Janssen to confuse the police, was found months later in Leuven.

=== Shana Appeltans (18) and Kevin Paulus (22) ===
On the night of Saturday, January 2, 2010, Janssen met his neighbour Shana Appeltans and her boyfriend Kevin Paulus, who were returning from a night out at a coffee shop in the area. He fetched a weapon and a flammable product, then rang the couple's doorbell. Under the threat of a gun, Janssen forced them to board their Opel Corsa. While Paulus was driving, Janssen sat next to him and Appeltans was in the back. He told Paulus to stop near a path, where he shot both of them several times. Back home, he burned his blood-covered clothes in the stove and scattered the ashes in a ditch, then threw his weapon in the Demer. At 2:43, firefighters were called for a car on fire. The autopsy on the couple's bodies proved that they were murdered. Arrested by the police two days later on Tuesday, January 4, 2010, Janssen confessed to the crime the same evening. He also admitted to raping Appeltans, but later recanted that statement.

=== Rapes ===
Ronald Janssen admitted to committing three rapes while studying in Leuven, but did not provide any evidence and said he no longer remembered the names or dates.

He admitted to a total of 5 rapes, but he is suspected of 20. The acts were committed between 2001 and 2010, with Janssen threatening his victims with a knife.

== Trial ==
Ronald Janssen's trial began on Tuesday, September 20, 2011, in Limbourg. The trial was chaired by Michel Jordens, assisted by Herline Wilmots and Niels Bollen. The prosecutor was Patrick Boyen. Janssen was defended by Zvonimir Miskovic, while Jef Vermassen represented Van Uytsel's parents. In his indictment, Advocate General Patrick Boyer asked for the maximum sentence by saying: "I will make sure that you stay in prison until your last breath. You are a psychopath, a rapist, torturer and serial killer."

One month after the start of the trial, the court jury found Ronald Janssen guilty on charges without mitigating circumstances, that is of three murders, kidnapping and rape with torture.

On Friday, October 21, 2011, he was sentenced to life imprisonment.

During his second trial, which began on Monday, September 10, 2012, in the Limburg Criminal Court in Hasselt, he was convicted of a dozen rapes with violence, sexual assault with a weapon, several attempted murders and acts of torture and barbarities. But given his life imprisonment sentence on October 21, 2011, the second verdict did not give Janssen any additional prison time.

== Documentaries ==
- Devoir d'enquête, second report: Ronald Janssen, a Flemish Dutroux?, broadcast on October 26, 2011, on the front page of La Une (RTBF).

== See also ==
- List of serial killers by country
