= List of anti-nuclear advocates in Germany =

This is a list of notable individuals who have publicly expressed reservations about nuclear power, nuclear weapons, and/or nuclear waste disposal in Germany. Many of these people have received the Nuclear-Free Future Award.

- Karl Bechert
- Hermann Behmel
- Hildegard Breiner
- Rolf Disch
- Hans-Peter Dürr
- Hans-Josef Fell
- Erich Fromm
- Siegwart Horst Günther
- Robert Jungk
- Irene Meichsner
- Rainer Moormann
- Claudia Roth
- Rüdiger Sagel
- Hermann Scheer
- Jens Scheer
- Gerhard Schröder
- Inge Schmitz-Feuerhake
- Michael Sladek
- Ursula Sladek
- Klaus Traube
- Roland Vogt
- Armin Weiss

== See also ==
- Anti-WAAhnsinns Festival
- Black bloc
- Brokdorf
- Bund für Umwelt und Naturschutz Deutschland
- Free Republic of Wendland
- Nuclear power phase-out
- Nuclear reprocessing plant Wackersdorf
- Renewable energy commercialization
- Renewable energy in Germany
- List of Nuclear-Free Future Award recipients
- List of books about nuclear issues
- List of Chernobyl-related articles
- List of nuclear whistleblowers
- Lists of nuclear disasters and radioactive incidents
