= Mitte 2 =

2014 novel by Albrecht Behmel

- Author: Albrecht Behmel
- Cover artist: Karsten Sturm
- Language: German
- Series: Mitte
- Subject: Mitte, Boheme, Berlin Characters Jenny Epstein, Wibke Schmidt, Tante Schacki Locations Berlin, Mumbai
- Genre: Comedy
- Published: 2014, 110th / Satzweiss
- Publication place: Germany
- Media type: E-Book; Print (hardcover and paperback)
- Pages: 320
- Preceded by: Mitte 1
- Followed by: Mitte 3

Mitte 2 Is the third episode of a comedic series of novels by German writer Albrecht Behmel. The eponymous “Mitte” (“downtown”) is the first and most central borough of the German capital known for its lively art scene, clubs and bars.

== Plot Introduction ==
Jenny Epstein has attracted a stalker, Fridjof, who is madly in love with her. She asks bumbling writer Albrecht for help. They swap their cell phones and thereby trigger a series of catastrophes and accidents during which Albrecht manages to attract a stalker for himself. He meets Mikki's stepmother, a wealthy jazz musician. She decides to help him finance a musical production but under the condition that Mikki marries and returns to his former job as a lawyer. What she doesn't know is that Mikki's current love-interest is her arch-rival, Margaud, another jazz-singer.

== Autobiographical Issues ==
The author claimed that no real-life persons were depicted in the novel, including the protagonist and narrator, also called ‘’Albrecht’’ who has no surname in the series, even though obvious parallels exist. Like the protagonist, the author was a resident of Berlin Mitte (1995-2012). Most of the locations, galleries, malls, shops and bars however are made up.

== Series and Production ==
The series includes four novels, all called “Mitte” plus a prequel titled “Homo Sapiens Berliner Art”, first published by Schenk, Passau, purchased an re-published by Satzweiss of Saarland in 2013. As a homage to the Hitchhiker’s Guide to the Galaxy, the Mitte-series of novels is labelled "a trilogy in five parts". Behmel started the series in 2006.

== See also ==
- Berlin Marathon
- Stalking
- Musical
- Alcoholism
- Rite of passage
- Modal realism

== Bibliography ==
- Berlin - Mitte, Schmiedecke, R. (2004).
- Street Scenes: Brecht, Benjamin and Berlin, Whybrow, N. (2004).
