= Markus Löw =

German footballer and manager

Personal information
- Date of birth: 4 April 1961 (age 65)
- Place of birth: Schönau, West Germany
- Positions: Midfielder; defender

Youth career
- FC Schönau 08

Senior career*
Years	Team	Apps	(Gls)
1980–1982	SC Freiburg	37	(4)
1982–1983	FV Biberach	26	(2)
1983–1985	FC Rastatt 04	62	(11)
1985–1988	SV Sandhausen	77	(1)
1989	VfL Neckarau	11	(1)
1989–1990	FV 09 Weinheim	17	(0)
1990–1993	TuS Lörrach-Stetten	min. 25	(1)
- * Club domestic league appearances and goals

Markus Löw (born 4 April 1961) is a former footballer who played as a midfielder or defender. He is the brother of Joachim Löw.
