= Mitte 1 =

Novel by Albrecht Behmel

- Author: Albrecht Behmel
- Cover artist: Karsten Sturm
- Language: German
- Series: Mitte
- Subject: Mitte, Boheme, Berlin Characters Jenny Epstein, Wibke Schmidt, Tante Schacki Locations Berlin, London
- Genre: Comedy
- Published: 2013, 110th / Satzweiss
- Publication place: Germany
- Media type: E-Book; Print (hardcover and paperback)
- Pages: 300
- Preceded by: Homo Sapiens Berliner Art
- Followed by: Mitte 2

Mitte 1 Is the second episode of a comedy series of novels by German writer Albrecht Behmel. The eponymous “Mitte” (“downtown”) is the first and most central borough of Germany’s capital Berlin. The series depicts the author as an extreme fictionalized version of himself as a struggling artist during the 1990s in post-reunification Berlin, when the once divided cold-war city became the nation’s capital almost over night resulting in a now-legendary social and artistic (but not financial) boom.

The novel is about today’s boheme in Berlin, artists, writers and proto-hipsters, the pre-Facebook emerging internet-culture of urban youth and dating; solitude and the dynamics of art as a commercial commodity.

== Plot Introduction ==
After struggling painter Albrecht gets introduced to Sow Luise of Kreuzberg, a pig, his career finally takes off - even though his snobbish and conservative family and his two competing girl-friends strongly disapprove of this professional choice of subject since they suspect it conveys a message. When Jenny Epstein, his secret love and room-mate, establishes a Country-and-Western band with bi-polar Timo, Albrecht has to choose between two artistic careers. He starts listening to his inner voice, as suggested by the apparently omniscient Wibke Schmidt, which brings him in all kinds of trouble. Especially during a musical context that his friend Mikki, now a self-proclaimed agent of the band, is determined to win the contest by all means. All plans fall apart when bi-polar Timo tries to commit suicide and Jenny Epstein gets pregnant but refuses to reveal the father.

== Notable Characters and Topics ==
- Albrecht, narrator and protagonist
- Jenny Epstein, the main antagonist and love-interest
- Wibke Schmidt, secondary antagonist
- Tante Schacki an irritable aunt and real-estate shark
- Mikki , a failed Lawyer and womanizer
- Susie , a highly competent waitress capable of teleportation

== Setting and Literary Style ==
The story is related in the first person singular by Albrecht, an unreliable narrator, a somewhat confused but charming young artist. Not unlike P.G. Wodehouse’s Bertie Wooster he has a talent to get himself into trouble and misunderstandings that he tries to explain away for his audience. The novel displays a variety of slang words and street-jargon alongside German upper-class parlance and hipster-lingo. It sheds a satirical light on the city’s creative arts sector which comprises music, film, advertising, architecture, art, design, fashion, performing arts, publishing, software, Decidedly a comedic novel, Mitte also relates the tragic side of a struggling artist’s existence. Each character was given a specific grammatical or geo-phonetical profile which the German language allows without leaving the relatively tolerant scope of modern High-German. In toto, Mitte is a postmodern mix of genres: an autobiography, a comedy, a work of fiction, an urban phantasy and a love-story.

== Major themes ==
The series covers a variety of recurring topics, like breaking up and making up, Berlin’s nightlife, alcohol and drugs, literature and the arts, horses and country and western music; bad cooking and psychological manipulation. On another level the novel is about growing up and finding a place in life, follies of today’s German society as well as esoteric superstitions and financial malpractice by the creative classes. This perspective comes to life via the protagonist-narrator’s thoughts about the next big thing in the arts and absurd, yet possible, new projects.

== Autobiographical Issues ==
The author claimed that no real-life persons were depicted in the novel, including the protagonist and narrator, also called ‘’Albrecht’’ who has no surname in the series, even though obvious parallels exist.

Like the protagonist, the author was a resident of Berlin Mitte in the 1990s and early 2010s. Most of the locations, galleries, malls, shops and bars however are made up.

== Series and Production ==
The series includes four novels, all called “Mitte” plus a prequel titled “Homo Sapiens Berliner Art”, first published by Schenk, Passau, purchased an re-published by Satzweiss of Saarland in 2013. As a homage to the Hitchhiker’s Guide to the Galaxy, the Mitte-series of novels is labelled "a trilogy in five parts". Behmel started the series in 2006.

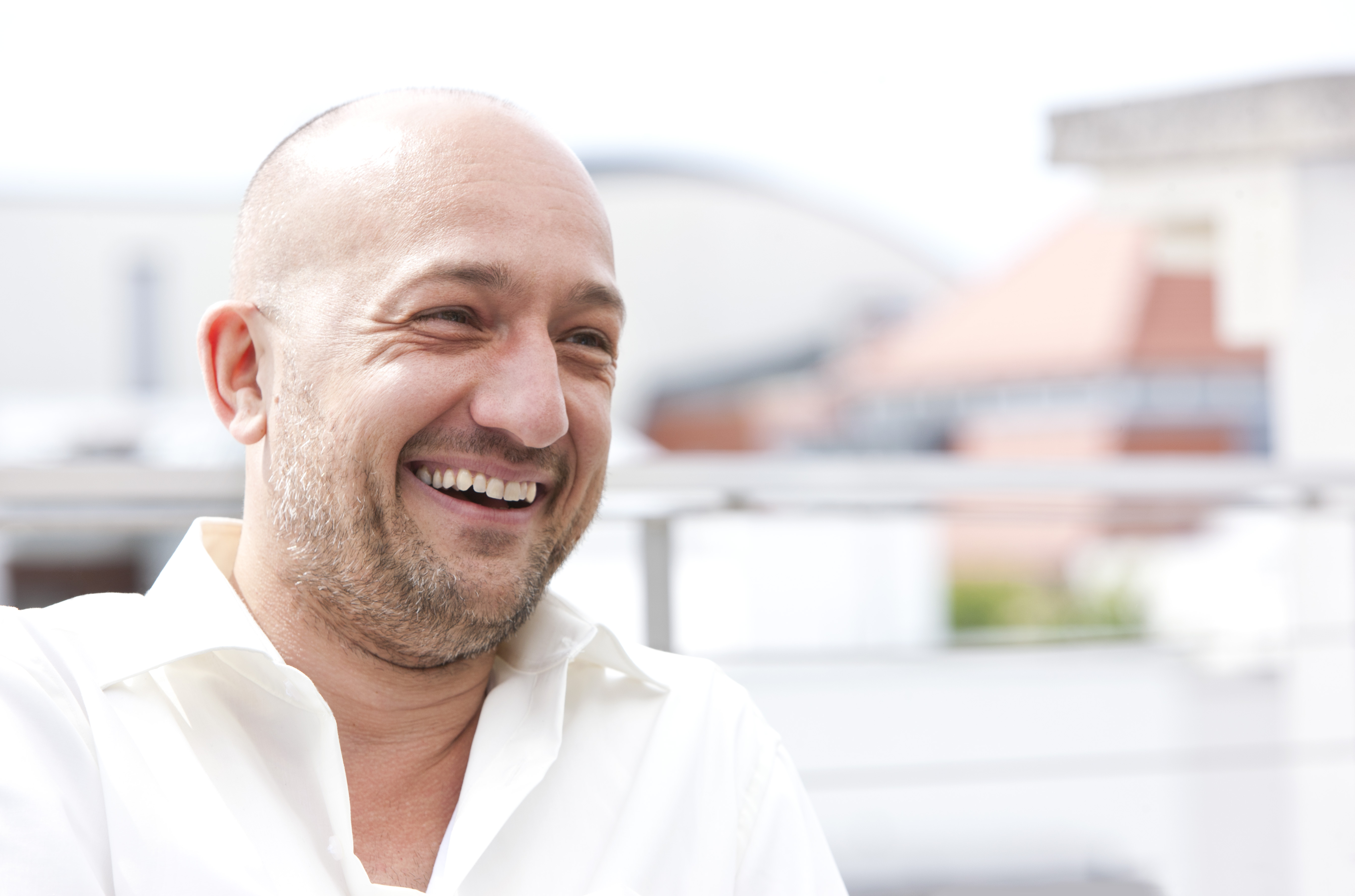
Albrecht Behmel in 2012

== See also ==
- Antihero
- L'Ingénu
- Rite of passage
- Modal realism
- Holden Caulfield
- Bertie Wooster

== Bibliography ==
- Tannert, Pielow, Berlin Art Scene, 2013, ISBN 978-3938100998
