= Das Nibelungenlied: Ein Heldenepos in 39 Abenteuern =

2001 novel by Albrecht Behmel

Das Nibelungenlied
- First edition
- Author: Albrecht Behmel
- Cover artist: Codex Manesse
- Language: German
- Subject: Characters Siegfried, Gunther, Griemhild, Hagen, Etzel Locations Worms, Rhine, Danube, Passau, Regensburg, Xanten
- Genre: Epic fantasy
- Published: 2001, ibidem
- Publication place: Germany
- Media type: E-Book; Print (hardcover and paperback)
- Pages: 395
- ISBN: 3898211452

Das Nibelungenlied (German: The Song of the Nibelungs) is a novel by German writer Albrecht Behmel about the medieval epic of the same name. The story follows the Middle High German original.

== Style ==
Behmel tried to convey the aspect of oral history into the form of a modern novel using a mix of slang, archaisms, poetic and factual language. The result is a matter of fact tone, sometimes humorous, sometimes drastic in its descriptions of violence for example during the battle at King Etzel's court. The gloomy atmosphere of the original poem was conserved all through the narration. Notably, the novel depicts clothes and weapons in rich detail but keeps the description of persons to a minimum.

== Plot summary ==
When Siegfried, a very rich barbarian prince from the north arrives at king Gunther's court he causes a dramatic shift in power. His vast treasure dwarfs and finally destroys the local economy. Therefore, the nobles plot to assassinate him. Siegfried, unaware of the plot helps king Gunther to find a wife, Brunhild of Iceland, and defeats the invading Saxons. The princess of the realm, Griemhild of Burdundy, has fallen in love with Siegfried and they marry. Hagen the murderer strikes and makes her a widow. She vows revenge. After ten years of mourning she marries again, king Etzel of Hungary. She invites her brothers and the nobles to her new home. When they arrive for the feast (against Hagen's advice) she has them all slaughtered.

== Notable characters ==
- Siegfried, a barbarian prince, dragon slayer and mythical hero. His world is one of magic and the rule of force which makes him a problematic guest and brother in law for the much more civilized nobles of Burgundy.
- Gunther, one of three brothers and king of Burgundy. Unlike Siegfried he does not own magical artifacts or weapons.
- Griemhild, Gunther's sister and princess of the realm, wife and widow of Siegfried; marries king Etzel of Hungary in her second marriage.
- Hagen, like Siegfried, Hagen is a mythical hero who is in touch with the magical world and its creatures. For him, Siegfried is a dangerous intruder and potential threat.
- Etzel, a rich king of the Huns and Griemhild's suitor after she became a widow. In the course of her vendetta against her own family his court is destroyed.
- Brunhild, a magical queen of the north who realizes too late that she had been tricked into marriage with Gunther by Siegfried which brings her into conflict with Griemhild.

== Title and major themes ==
The original poem was known as Nibelung's lament or the song of the Nibelungs. The novel retains the traditional title even though it is in prose. The same approach has been taken by George R. R. Martin with A Song of Ice and Fire. The original Nibelung was a mythical guardian of a treasure. After his death the various subsequent owners of the treasure called themselves Nibelungs. At its core the novel discusses revenge, assassination and assimilation. Various subplots feature magical creatures, feudal traditions, tourneys and early medieval warfare.

== Historical background ==
A historical nucleus of the saga lies in events of the Germanic Migration Period, in particular the defeat of the Burgundians by Flavius Aëtius with the aid of Hunnic mercenaries near Worms in ca. AD 436. Other possible influences are the feud between the 6th century Merovingian queens Brunhilda and Fredegunde, as well as the marriage of Attila with the Burgundian princess Ildikó in AD 453. In October 2006, USA Today listed Siegfried as #7 on their list of Imaginary Luminaries: the 101 most influential people who never lived.

== See also ==
- German mythology
- Nibelungs
- Alberich
- Nibelungensaga
- Kriemhild's revenge

== Bibliography ==
- Campbell, Ian R. "Hagen`s shield request - Das Nibelungenlied, 37th Aventiure". In: GR 71 (1996), S. 23-34.
- Dick, Ernst S. "The Nibelungenlied between epic and romance: the genre aspect in the process of reception". In: Von Otfrid von Weißenburg bis zum 15. Jahrhundert. Hrsg. v. Albrecht Classen. Göppingen 1991, S. 53-64. (=GAG; 539).
- Flood, John L. "The severed heads: on the deaths of Gunther and Hagen". In: German narrative literature of the twelfth and thirteenth centuries. Hrsg. v. Volker Honemann. Tübingen 1994, S.173-191.
