= Homo Sapiens Berliner Art =

2012 novel by Albrecht Behmel

- Author: Albrecht Behmel
- Cover artist: Frank Gerdes
- Language: German
- Series: Mitte
- Subject: Mitte, Boheme, Berlin Characters Jenny Epstein, Wibke Schmidt, Felizitas Locations Berlin, Rügen
- Genre: Comedy
- Published: 2012, Schenk’s Passau
- Publication place: Germany
- Media type: E-Book; Print (hardcover and paperback)
- Pages: 279
- ISBN: 978-3-939337-78-2
- Followed by: Mitte 1

Homo Sapiens Berliner Art is the first episode in a semi-autobiographic series of satirical novels by the German writer Albrecht Behmel.

== Plot Overview ==
Struggling artist Albrecht breaks up with his girl-friend and suddenly finds himself alone in a huge and empty apartment in downtown Berlin. A new roommate moves in, overweight Guru Chris, who specializes in self-help courses for stressed managers. He turns out to be broke so the two young men start to work on their finances - with catastrophic results. Inspired by a beautiful girl named Jana, Albrecht starts a series of oil paintings but Chris is allergic to paint. Albrecht, while dog sitting his sister's golden retriever Orest misses the birthday of his wealthy uncle George, an octogenarian. When Albrecht visits George to apologize, the uncle, having misplaced his hearing aids, misunderstands and keeps the dog as a gift. Albrecht tries to find another dog for either the uncle or his sister, but fails so he decides to flee the city. Meanwhile, more people move into the apartment, sexy Jenny Epstein who never had an uncle (so she adopts George) and young cousin Bernhard, an under-age kleptomaniac who thinks he is a womanizer. On the baltic island of Rügen Albrecht makes friends with posh Wibke Schmidt, who believes to be a telepath. They return to Berlin when Chris tells them that he has managed to organize a happening for Albrecht's paintings (during which the paintings are burned). Later uncle George dies. Jenny is devastated. The family suspects her to be a legacy huntress which adds to her grief. Upset by too much clan-diplomacy, Albrecht misses the funeral just like he missed the birthday and has to improvise once again.

== Notable Characters ==
- Albrecht, narrator and protagonist; a struggling artist of little talent, who claims he just has not yet found his medium so he experiments.
- Felizitas, his tartly sister, who believes, Albrecht never will find his medium
- Chris, an overweight self-help Guru who specializes in management training seminars
- Jenny Epstein, a hard drinking country singer and orphan
- Uncle George, a wealthy relative
- Orest, his dog
- Herta a down-to earth housekeeper
- Wibke Schmidt, a self-proclaimed telepath and therapist
- Mikki, a failed lawyer and lonely womanizer

== Title and major themes ==
“Homo Sapiens Berliner Art” is the name of a longdrink based on espresso. The Book is about arty folk in Germany's capital during the nineties, the internet bubble and years before the advent of the hipster even though similar phenomena did exist. The novel is satirical in that it exaggerates the shortcomings of the art business, the importance of family ties and failed expectations concerning financial income. It is also mocks Berlin's notorious night-life and party-scene. Most of the place names are fictional, except a bar named after photographer Helmut Newton and downtown streets like Friedrichstrasse.

== See also ==
- Antihero
- L'Ingénu
- Rite of passage
- Modal realism
- Ephraim Kishon
