= Nikolai von Koslowski =

German journalist

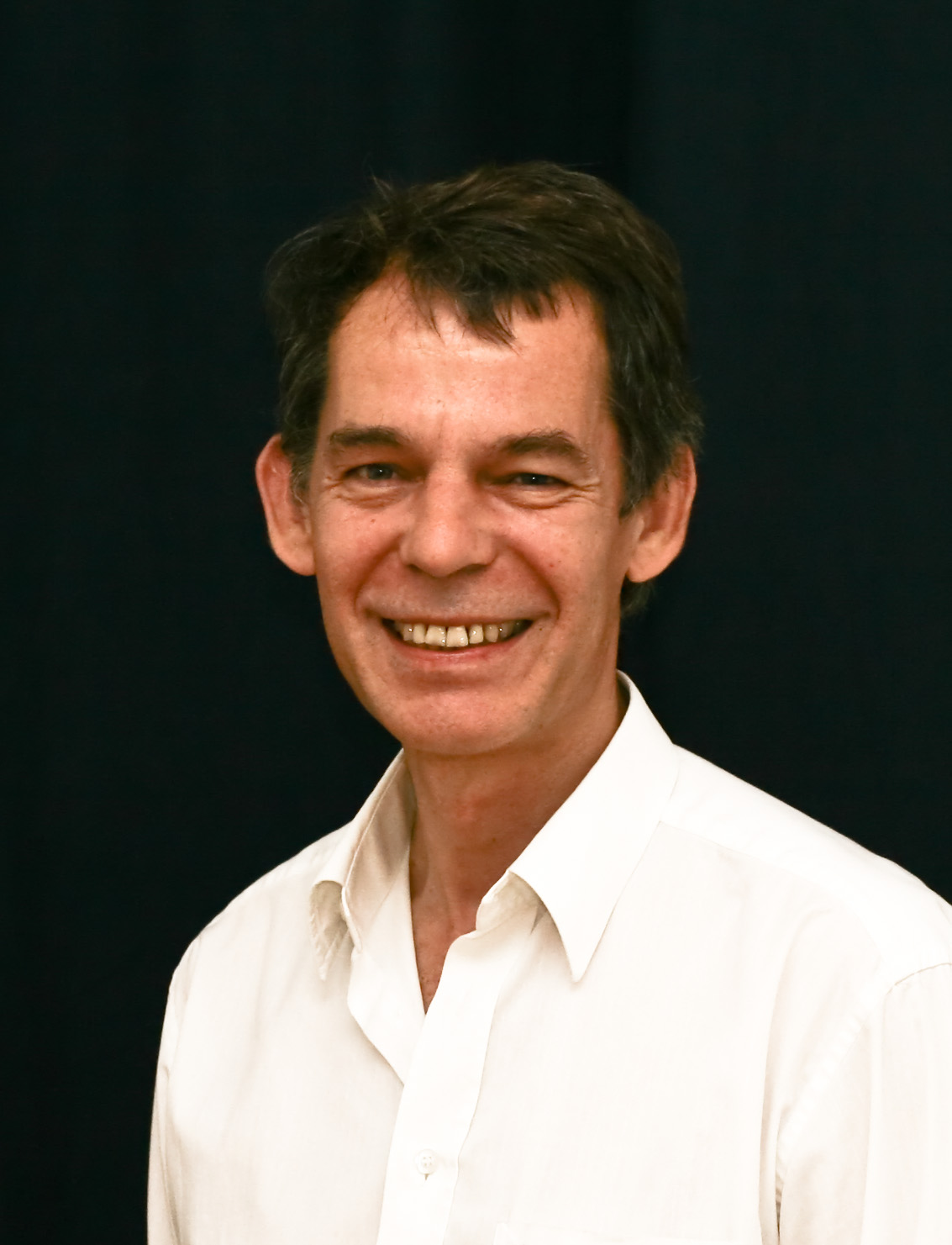
- Von Koslowski in 2007
- Born: 3 February 1958 (age 68); Esslingen, Baden-Württemberg, Germany
- Occupation: Journalist

Nikolai von Koslowski (born 3 February 1958 in Esslingen) is a German journalist and award-winning director of radio plays like Die Stammheim Bänder in 2009 and the prestigious Deutschen Hörbuchpreis.

== Life and work ==
He moved to Berlin in 1988 and worked for Sender Freies Berlin (SFB) with Peter Leonhard Braun. During his studies at LMU Munich he worked with Bayerischer Rundfunk and „Zündfunk“.

== Award-winning radio plays (selection) ==
- 2002: Nicht schuldig. Kriegsverbrecher aus dem ehemaligen Jugoslawien vor dem Internationalen Gerichtshof in Den Haag von Slavenka Drakulic, SFB/ORB. Geisendörfer-Preis
- 2003: Ist das Ihr Fahrrad, Mr. O'Brien? – Eine Hörspielcollage aus der Welt der Wissenschaft und des Suffs von Albrecht Behmel; Hörspiel des Monats September 2003, Hörspiel des Monats der Deutschen Akademie der Darstellenden Künste.
- 2005: Vergitterte Welt. Katrin L.: Die Geschichte einer Magersucht von Helga Dierichs, NDR. Geisendörfer-Preis
- 2007: Der konkrete Schrecken des Krieges. Die Bundeswehr und der Tod von Udo Zindel, MDR. Geisendörfer-Preis
- 2008: La Sehnsucht. Franzosen in Berlin von Clarisse Cossais, SWR. Deutsch-Französischer Journalistenpreis 2009
- 2009: Die Stammheim-Bänder von Maximilian Schönherr, WDR. Deutscher Hörbuchpreis
- 2009: Koma-Kicks. Erkundungen unter jungen Kampftrinkern von Tom Schimmeck. Preis Bremer Hörkino und Deutscher Sozialpreis
- 2010: Bonga Boys. Global Village Stories von Martina Schulte, WDR. Deutscher Radiopreis
