= Schönau im Schwarzwald =

- Town
- Coat of arms

- Location of Schönau im Schwarzwald within Lörrach district
- Interactive map of Schönau im Schwarzwald
- Location within Germany Location within Baden-Württemberg
- Coordinates: 47°47′12″N 07°53′39″E
- Country: Germany
- State: Baden-Württemberg
- Admin. region: Freiburg
- District: Lörrach
- Municipal assoc.: Schönau im Schwarzwald

Government
  - Mayor (2020–28): Peter Schelshorn

Area
  - Total: 14.72 km^{2} (5.68 sq mi)
- Elevation: 540 m (1,770 ft)

Population (2025-12-31)
  - Total: 2,452
  - Density: 166.6/km^{2} (431.4/sq mi)
- Time zone: UTC+01:00 (CET)
  - Summer (DST): UTC+02:00 (CEST)
- Postal codes: 79677
- Dialling codes: 07673
- Vehicle registration: LÖ
- Website: www.schoenau-im-schwarzwald.de

Schönau im Schwarzwald (German pronunciation: [ˈʃøːnaʊ ʔɪm ˈʃvaʁtsvalt], lit. 'Schönau in the Black Forest') is a town in the district of Lörrach in Baden-Württemberg, Germany. It is situated in the Black Forest, on the river Wiese, 35 kilometres (22 mi) northeast of Basel, Switzerland, and 23 kilometres (14 mi) south of Freiburg.

== Energy infrastructure ==
After the 1986 Chernobyl disaster, a small group led by Michael and Ursula Sladek founded the Parents for a Nuclear Free Future group, to research how they could limit the community's dependence on nuclear power. Their first approach was on saving energy and getting others to save energy. They reactivated small hydropower plants in the region. The couple developed the idea of a power system independent of nuclear power plants, generating electric power through distributed mini power plants from renewable sources. After ten years of campaigning and raising awareness, they founded the first German green power utility, the Elektrizitätswerke Schönau (EWS), in 1994. They took over providing power for the community in 1997. With a system that combined efficiency and power-saving strategies, it became possible to satisfy the power consumption of the community. Schönau was the first community in a Western country that became independent of the national power grid and could decide how its power would be produced.

== Mayors ==
- 1945–1946: Albert Gutmann
- 1946–1956: Karl Zimmermann
- 1957–1977: Ludwig Morath (FWV)
- 1977–1993: Richard Böhler (CDU)
- 1993–2012: Bernhard Seger (CDU)
- since 2012: Peter Schelshorn (CDU)

== Notable people from Schönau ==
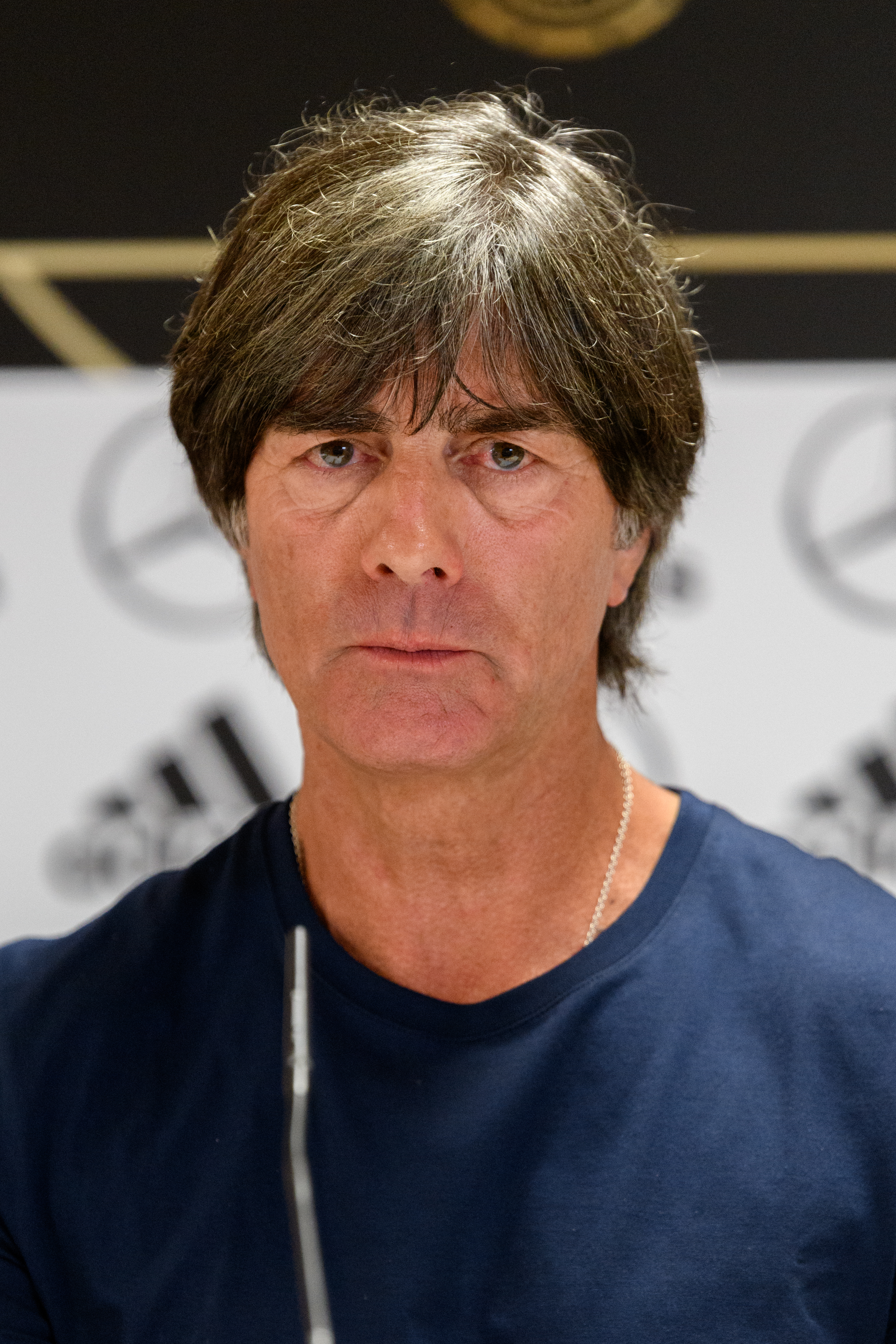
Jogi Löw, 2018

- Fridolin Dietsche (1861–1908), sculptor
- Karl Geiler (1878–1953), legal scientist and politician
- Albert Leo Schlageter (1894–1923), German Freikorps fighter
- Michael Sladek (1946–2024), ecologist

=== Sport ===
- Joachim (Jogi) Löw (born 1960), German footballer and coach of the national football team from 2006 to 2021
- Markus Löw (born 1961), former footballer, now a coach, brother of Jogi Löw

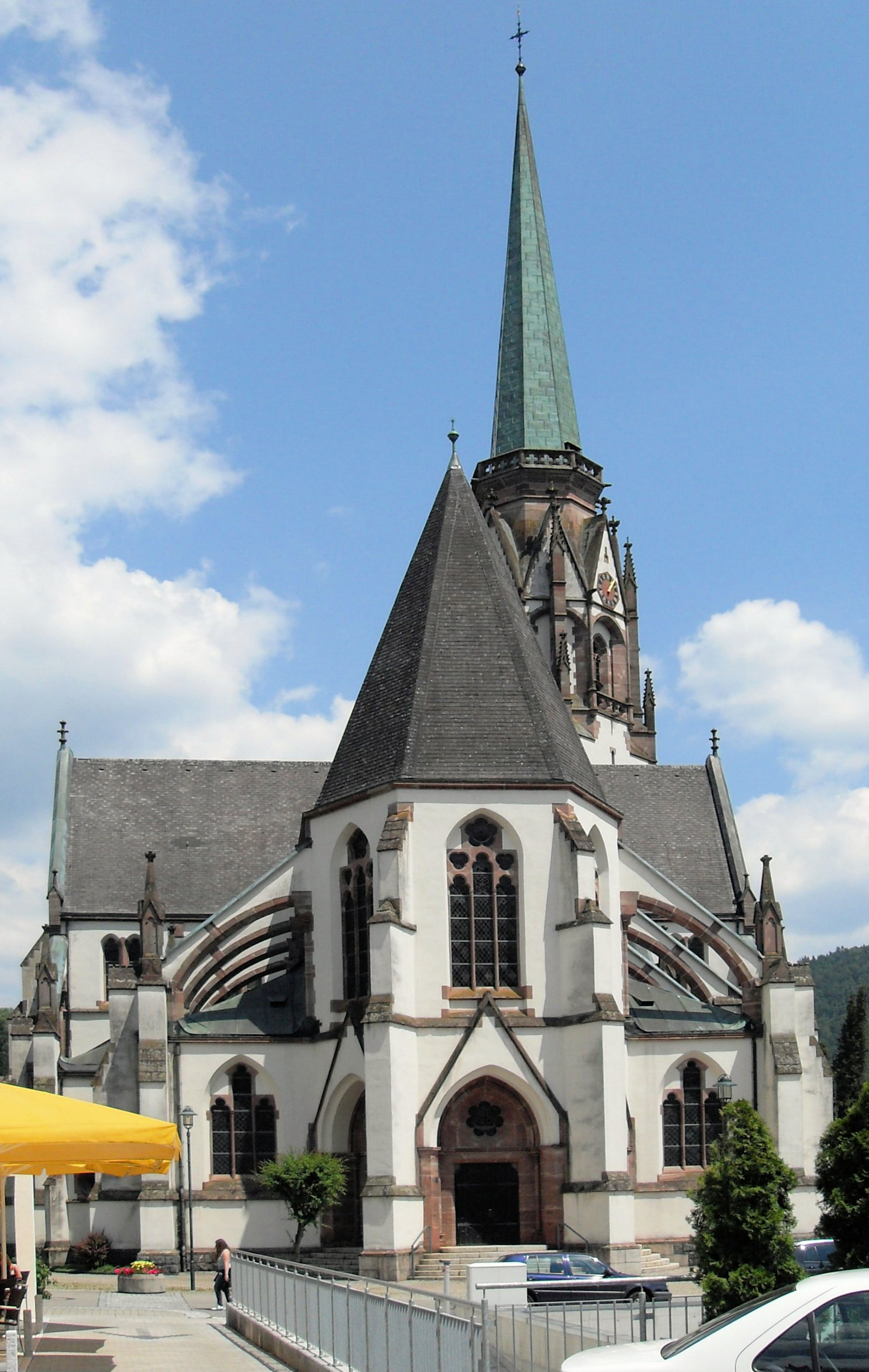
Church of Assumption of Mary

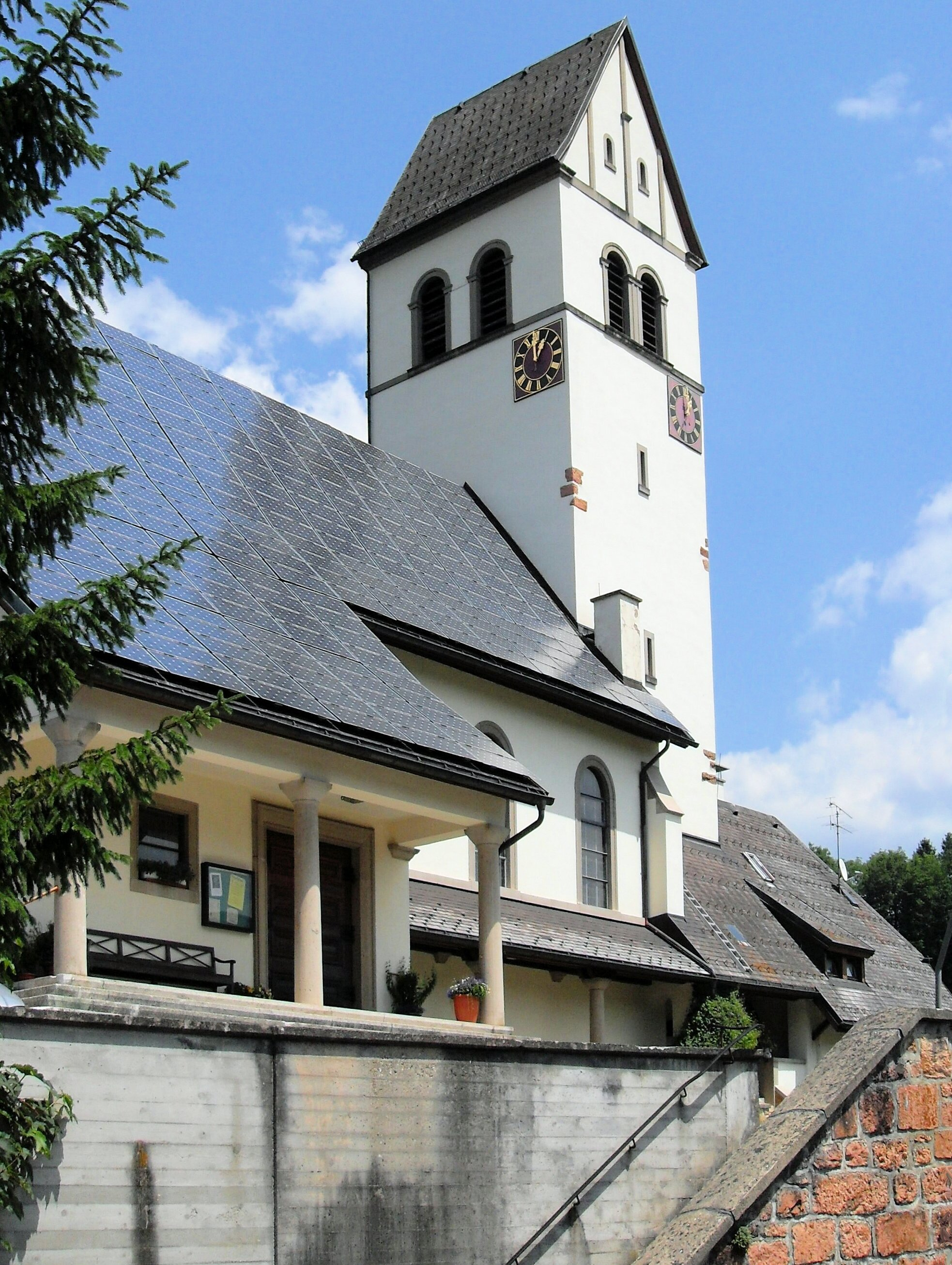
Protestant church
