= Albrecht Behmel =

German novelist, historian and playwright

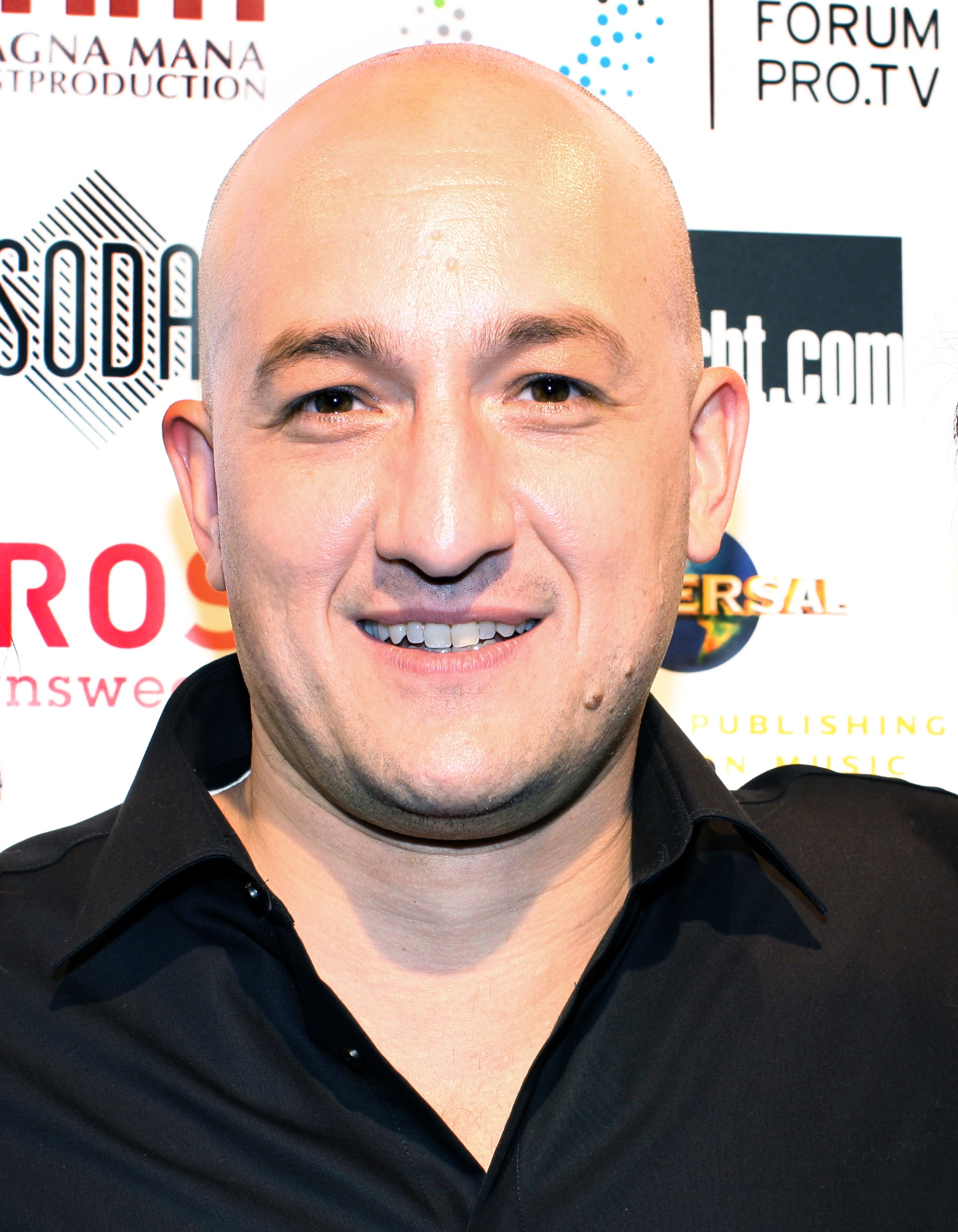
- Behmel in 2011 at Filmforum.
- Born: 24 March 1971; Baden-Württemberg, West Germany
- Education: University of Heidelberg
- Occupations: Novelist; screenwriter; essayist
- Writing career
- Pen name: Albrecht, Timothy Patterson
- Years active: 1999–present
- Genres: comedy, drama, fantasy, non-fiction

Albrecht Behmel (German: [German: ˈalbʁɛçt ˈbeːməl]; born 24 March 1971) is a German artist, novelist, historian, non-fiction writer and award-winning playwright.

== Surname and family history ==
Behmel is the son of the geologist Hermann Behmel and grandson of the architect Paul Behmel. The uncommon family name is a Germanicized form of the Czech given name Bogomil, and it was from Bohemia that their family emigrated to Saxony in the early 18th century. On his mother's side he is a descendant of Christoph Martin Wieland, a Swabian poet and writer of the Enlightenment.

== Life ==
After working as a bouncer and a puppeteer in Paris, France, in the early 1990s, Behmel moved to Heidelberg, Germany to complete his studies in humanities. Here he was a fellow student of Silvana Koch-Mehrin and Gerrit Jasper Schenk as well as at Humboldt University, Berlin, Germany. He has published works on ancient history, Greek naval warfare, and early German literature, such as the Nibelungenlied. Most notable, however, are a series of self-help e-books for fellow students, making him one of the pioneers of German electronic publishing. He used the pseudonym Timothy Patterson for two titles. He is noted to suffer from insomnia. He was a business consultant between 1995 and 2005. His published work includes novels, like Mitte 1, Homo Sapiens Berliner Art; radio plays, computer games, film scripts and stage plays as well as non-fiction. He has worked for a number of German and international TV stations, like ARTE and ARD. Behmel founded a network for film and media professionals, Filmforum, in 2008.

In 2013 he founded Samiel Award, an annual literary prize for antagonists of newly published German novels. The first Samiel Award went to Austrian writer Jan Kossdorff for a dark humor novel about human trafficking and advertising agencies. The award is supported by publisher Marc Hiller of Stuttgart. Winning writers receive 666 Euros, the number of the beast.

== The Magic of the Swarms ==
A series of paintings developed by Albrecht in 2013 and 2014, The Magic of the Swarms is about the fusion of shapes into more complex forms and about the interaction of colours. But it is also a geometrical game called Abstrahism: Intricate chaotic systems consist of simple overlapping elements. The colours help define the shape, but at the same time emphasise the intricacies of the interaction of each silhouette. The work is influenced by ecclesiastical lead lights and Buddhist mandalas.

Real-life silhouettes merge into something almost but not totally abstract – a swarm of forms that is more than the sum of its elements or parts. It is a way to perceive the world using techniques of geometry and cartography to depict motion and form. Expressive colours underline the aspects of contrast and combination. Three-dimensional bodies are reduced to two dimensions.

== Exhibitions ==
2026

- Ikonen, Rasselmania, Hildesheim
- Werkschau 2, Galerie Meinlschmidt, Kunsthalle Balingen
- JO21, Neues Wieder Sehen, Stuttgart

2025

- Werkschau 1, Galerie Meinlschmidt, Kunsthalle Balingen
- Topologie, Dahler Rosewood, München
- Works, Jule Plate Galerie List auf Sylt
- Superheroes Batman, Hulk and Thor”, LUMAS, Hannover & Stuttgart
- Genesis”, St. Rupert, Traunstein

2024

- ART 4 Ukraine, Berlin (Connected Hearts)
- Palais Wickenburg, Vienna
- Lentfest, AGAP, Archdiocese of Glasgow
- KSI, Siegburg

2023

- Kunsthalle Löffingen
- Art4Ukraine, St Wendel
- Art4Ukraine Düsseldorf
- Art4Ukraine Frankfurt/M

2022

- Preview ML Konzept, Freudenstadt
- United in Peace, Böblingen

2021

- Kreative Hug, Freudenstadt

2020

- Kunsthalle Altensteig
- Städtische Kunstsammlung Jena

2019

- Baiersbronn Conversations

2018

- Chateau Savant, Cannes, France
- Taste of Contemporary, Miami, USA
- Gesichter einer Stadt, photo exhibition, Freudenstadt
- Featured Artist at DMEXCO, Cologne

2017

- Dark Side of Marvelous, Beverly Hills, CA, USA, Solo Show
- Acts of Kindness Gala, Manila Philippines, Group Show
- Art Expo New York, Pier 94

2016

- Rathaus Backnang, 2016 (solo)
- Convensis Group, Stuttgart, 2016 (solo)
- Universitätsklinik Mannheim, 2016 (solo)
- Al Madad Foundation, London, 2016 (group)
- Landtag von Brandenburg, Potsdam, 2016 (group)
- Carrousel du Louvre, Paris, France, 2016

2015

- Touring Exhibition, Berlin, Riga, St. Petersburg, London, 2015
- Evelina Children's Hospital, London, 2015 (group)
- White Space Black Box Galerie, Neuchatel, 2015 (group)
- Amrey Heyne Galerie, Stuttgart, 2015 (group)

== Style and motifs ==
Two recurring motifs of most of his books are urban culture and the pitfalls of modern communication but also horsemanship and alcoholism or a mix thereof. Irish folk music, academic ceremonies and ancient mythology appear in some fiction works. Most dialogues feature a variety of German dialects and slangs. Some novels have been compared to the work of Israeli writer Ephraim Kishon.

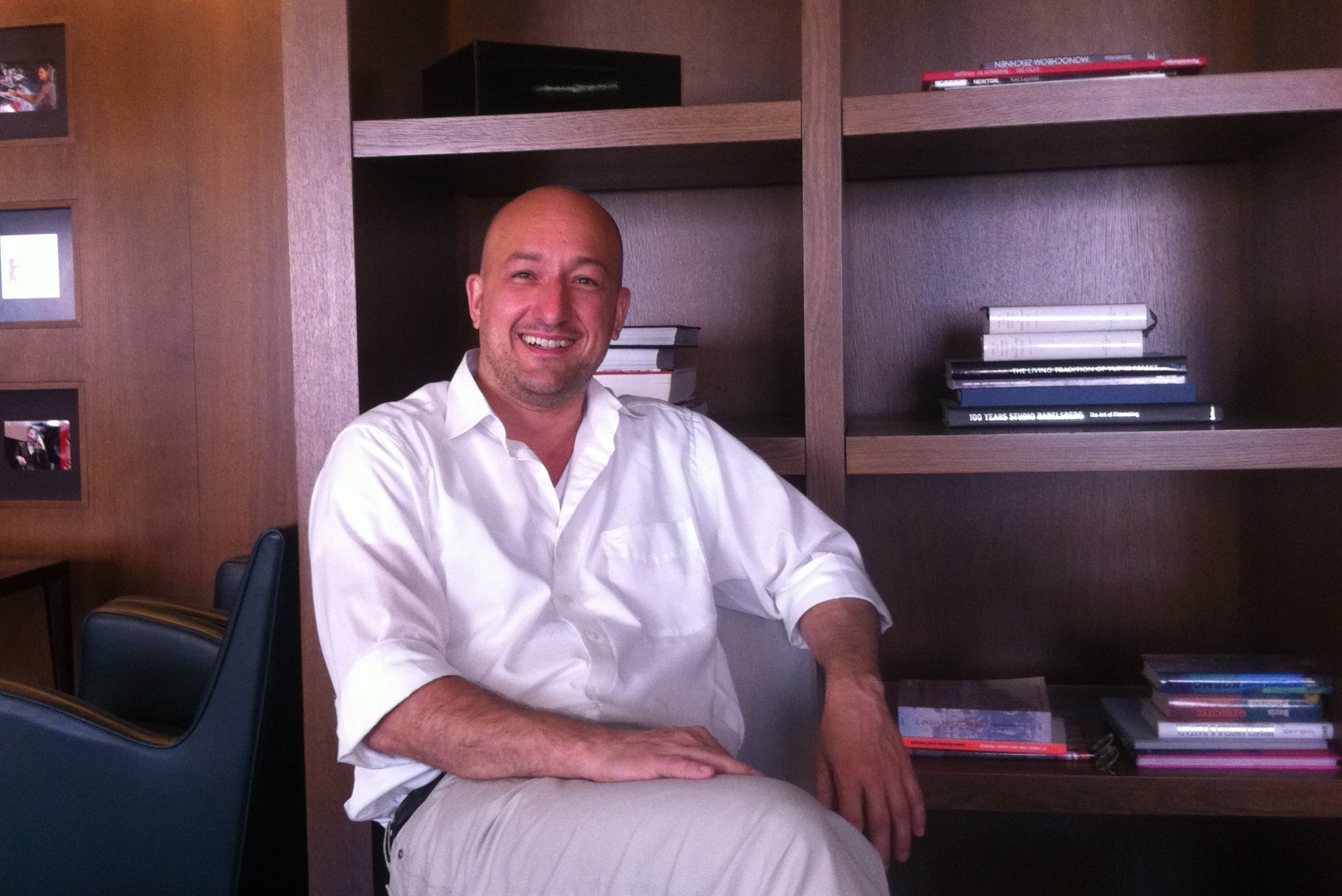
Albrecht Behmel, 2013

== Political views ==
The general standpoint professed in most of his non-fiction works can be described as libertarian, anti-establishment, christian and pro-science with a general distrust in worldly doctrines, political ideologies of whatever color. A recurring thought is that institutions like most governments, schools, and universities have not kept up with current social developments for decades, and in some cases, centuries, which contradicts their claim to leading positions within society.

== Awards ==
- Radio play, September 2003: Hörspiel des Monats for Ist das Ihr Fahrrad, Mr. O'Brien? Eine Hörspielcollage aus der Welt der Wissenschaft und des Suffs, directed by: Nikolai von Koslowski. About the life, the work and death of the Irish writer Flann O'Brien.

== Bibliography ==
=== Fiction ===
- The Threshold, Digital Publishers, Stuttgart, 2015
- The Stronghold (novel), Urbane Publications, London, 2015
- Mitte 2, 110th, Satzweiss, 2014
- Mitte 1, 110th, Satzweiss, 2013
- Doktor Faust und Mephisto, 110th, Satzweiss, 2013
- Homo Sapiens Berliner Art. Schenk, Passau 2010, ISBN 978-3-939337-78-2
- Das Nibelungenlied. Ein Heldenepos in 39 Abenteuern. Nacherzählung. Ibidem-Verlag, Stuttgart 2001, ISBN 3-89821-145-2
- Auf dem Rücken der Pferde liegt das Glück dieser Erde. Weltbild, Augsburg 2006, ISBN 3-8289-8118-6
- Von der Kunst, zwischen sich und dem Boden ein Pferd zu behalten. Berlin 2005, ISBN 3-89769-910-9

=== Non-fiction ===
- Lexikon der Filmschurken January 2020
- The Successful Kid – A Diary for Smart Young Minds, August 2015
- Die Mitteleuropadebatte in der Bundesrepublik Deutschland. Zwischen Friedensbewegung, kultureller Identität und deutscher Frage. Ibidem-Verlag, Hannover 2011, ISBN 978-3-8382-0201-3
- 1968 – Die Kinder der Diktatur. Der Mythos der Studentenbewegung im ideengeschichtlichen Kontext des „hysterischen Jahrhunderts“ 1870 bis 1968. Hannover 2011, ISBN 978-3-8382-0203-7
- Erfolgreich im Studium der Geisteswissenschaften. Francke, Tübingen 2005, ISBN 3-7720-3371-7
- Manuskripte druckreif formatieren. Ibidem-Verlag, Stuttgart 2001, ISBN 3-89821-137-1
- Was sind Gedankenexperimente? Kontrafaktische Annahmen in der Philosophie des Geistes – der Turingtest und das Chinesische Zimmer. Stuttgart 2001, ISBN 3-89821-109-6
- Themistokles, Sieger von Salamis und Herr von Magnesia. Die Anfänge der athenischen Klassik zwischen Marathon und Salamis. Stuttgart 2000, ISBN 3-932602-72-2

=== Radio plays ===
- Ist das Ihr Fahrrad, Mr. O'Brien? Eine Hörspielcollage aus der Welt der Wissenschaft und des Suffs. SR 2003

=== Computer games and films ===
- Out of the Present
- Fortress Under Siege
