= Joachim Löw =

German football manager (born 1960)

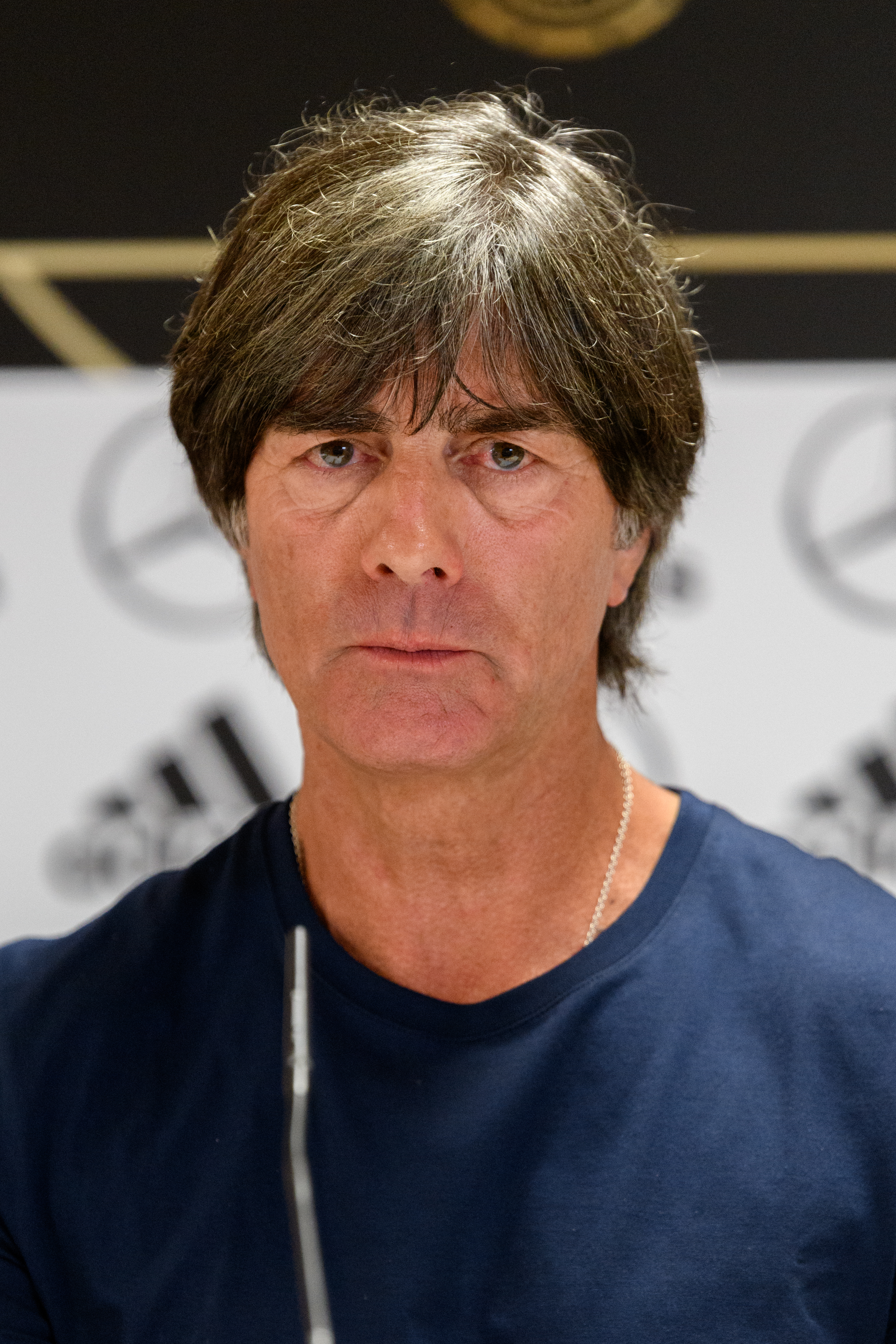
- Löw as Germany manager in 2018

Personal information
- Full name: Joachim Löw
- Date of birth: 3 February 1960 (age 66)
- Place of birth: Schönau im Schwarzwald, West Germany
- Height: 1.82 m (6 ft 0 in)
- Position: Attacking midfielder

Youth career
- TuS Schönau 1896
- FC Schönau
- Eintracht Freiburg

Senior career*
Years	Team	Apps	(Gls)
1978–1980	SC Freiburg	71	(18)
1980–1981	VfB Stuttgart	4	(0)
1981–1982	→ Eintracht Frankfurt (loan)	24	(5)
1982–1984	SC Freiburg	65	(25)
1984–1985	Karlsruher SC	24	(2)
1985–1989	SC Freiburg	116	(38)
1989–1992	FC Schaffhausen	96	(23)
1992–1994	FC Winterthur	57	(12)
1994–1995	FC Frauenfeld		

International career
1979–1980	West Germany U21	4	(0)

Managerial career
- 1992–1994: FC Winterthur (youth)
- 1994–1995: FC Frauenfeld
- 1995–1996: VfB Stuttgart (assistant)
- 1996: VfB Stuttgart (interim)
- 1996–1998: VfB Stuttgart
- 1998–1999: Fenerbahçe
- 1999–2000: Karlsruher SC
- 2000–2001: Adanaspor
- 2001–2002: Tirol Innsbruck
- 2003–2004: Austria Wien
- 2004–2006: Germany (assistant)
- 2006–2021: Germany
Medal record
Men's football
Representing Germany (as manager)
FIFA World Cup
Winner	2014
Bronze medal – third place	2010
UEFA European Championship
Runner-up	2008
Bronze medal – third place	2012
Bronze medal – third place	2016
FIFA Confederations Cup
Winner	2017
- * Club domestic league appearances and goals

Joachim Löw (German pronunciation: [ˈjoːaxɪm ˈløːf]; born 3 February 1960) is a German football coach and former player. He was the manager of the Germany national team from 2006 until 2021. During his tenure as manager, he led Germany to victory at the 2014 FIFA World Cup in Brazil and the 2017 FIFA Confederations Cup in Russia. In March 2021, Löw announced that he would resign from his position after the delayed Euro 2020. Of all head coaches of the Germany national football team, Löw has managed (198) and won the most matches (124).

== Early life ==
Joachim Löw was born on 3 February 1960 in Schönau im Schwarzwald, Baden-Württemberg, West Germany.

== Playing career ==
In 1978, Löw started his playing career with 2. Bundesliga club SC Freiburg. He returned to the club twice (1982, 1985) and held the club's overall goal scoring record until 2020, when Nils Petersen surpassed him. In 1980, Löw joined VfB Stuttgart in the Bundesliga, but he had difficulties establishing himself in the starting lineup and played only four matches.

In the 1981–82 season, Löw played for Eintracht Frankfurt (24 matches, five goals), but he returned to Freiburg the following year. In 1982–83, he scored eight goals in 34 matches, 1983–84 he scored 17 goals in 31 matches in the 2. Bundesliga. Afterwards, he returned to the Bundesliga with Karlsruher SC, but he only scored two goals in 24 matches. Later, he joined Freiburg again for four years, played 116 matches and scored 38 goals. Löw concluded his career in Switzerland, where he played for FC Schaffhausen (1989–1992) and FC Winterthur (1992–1994).

Löw played four times for the West Germany national under-21 team.

== Managerial career ==
=== 1992–2004: club management ===
==== Early career ====
Löw started his coaching career as a youth coach for FC Winterthur while he was still active as a player. In 1994–95, he served as player-coach of FC Frauenfeld.

In 1995–96, he became an assistant coach to VfB Stuttgart head coach Rolf Fringer. As Fringer had the opportunity to become coach of the Switzerland national team, Löw was promoted caretaker manager on 14 August 1996. He eventually became the permanent manager and was at the club until 21 May 1998. His first match as head coach was a 4–0 win against Schalke 04 on 17 August 1996. They finished the 1996–97 season in fourth place. The 1997–98 season started with a 3–0 against Karlsruher SC on 22 July 1997 in the semi–final of the DFB-Ligapokal. They went on to lose in the final against Bayern Munich on 26 July 1997. In the Bundesliga, Stuttgart finished in fourth place.

During the season, in the DFB-Pokal, Stuttgart reached the competition's semi-finals, defeating reserve teams of Borussia Mönchengladbach, Hertha BSC, SSV Ulm 1846 and KFC Uerdingen 05 en route. In the semi-final on 17 February 1998, however, Bayern Munich defeated Stuttgart 3–0. Stuttgart also got to the final of the UEFA Cup Winners' Cup. Stuttgart eliminated IP Vestmannaeyja, Beerschot, Slavia Prague and Lokomotiv Moscow. In the final on 13 May 1998, Stuttgart lost 1–0 to Chelsea. This proved to be his final match as he left the club seven days later. He finished with a record of 46 wins, 20 draws and 23 losses.

Löw joined Turkish club Fenerbahçe on 1 July 1998. His first match was a 0–0 draw against Dardanelspor. During the 1998–99 season, Fenerbahçe finished third in the Süper Lig and were eliminated in the first round of the UEFA Cup. They were serving a one-year ban in the Turkish Cup.

==== Return to Germany and back to Turkey ====
Löw became manager of Karlsruher SC on 25 October 1999. His first match was a 1–1 draw against Hannover 96 on 31 October 1999. He was manager until 19 April 2000, finishing with a record of one win, seven draws and ten losses. His final match was a 3–1 loss to Hannover on 16 April 2000, while his only win came in a 2–1 win against Fortuna Köln on 19 March 2000. He was sacked, with the club in last place (18th). Marco Pezzaiuoli replaced Löw for the remainder of the season and only had two wins in the remaining seven matches, finished the season in last place (18th), and were relegated.

Löw returned to Turkey as manager of Adanaspor from 20 December 2000 to 2 March 2001. He did not win any matches during this time. When he left Adanaspor, the club was in the relegation zone at 16th place.

==== Coaching in Austria ====
Löw became the manager of Austrian club Tirol Innsbruck on 10 October 2001 and led them to the 2001–02 Austrian Bundesliga title. He finished with a record of 11 wins, five draws and nine losses. The same year, the club had to declare bankruptcy and was liquidated. Löw was once again unemployed. He was with Austria Wien from 1 July 2003 to 24 March 2004. During the 2003–04 season, Wien were eliminated from the Champions League by Marseille in the third qualifying round and eliminated from the UEFA Cup by Borussia Dortmund in the first round. They won the 2003 Austrian Supercup against FC Kärnten. He left the club on 24 March 2004; Austria Wien were in first place at the time of his departure.

=== 2004–2006: Germany assistant manager ===
When Jürgen Klinsmann succeeded Rudi Völler as the head coach of the Germany national team following a disappointing UEFA Euro 2004, he brought Löw into the German setup as assistant manager. Klinsmann and Löw had met years earlier at a coaching school and both shared a philosophy focused on attacking football. Under their reign, Klinsmann and Löw's German team reached the semi-final stage at the 2005 FIFA Confederations Cup and 2006 FIFA World Cup.

Germany lost 3–2 to Brazil in the semi-final of the 2005 Confederations Cup, but subsequently defeated Mexico 4–3 in the third place encounter. Klinsmann and Löw's new attacking philosophy saw Germany score the most goals (15 in 5 matches) of any team in the tournament.

Germany opened the 2006 World Cup on 9 June in Munich with a 4–2 victory against Costa Rica. A last minute 1–0 win over Poland and a 3–0 win over Ecuador followed. Germany defeated Sweden in the round of 16 with two Lukas Podolski goals, followed by a grueling battle with Argentina. In the penalty shootout after finishing extra time at 1–1, the coaching staff gave Jens Lehmann a prepared list of possible Argentinian penalty takers and their preferred way to shoot, which was reported to have helped ensure Germany's victory. In the semi-final match with Italy, however, the hosts conceded two goals in the final two minutes of extra time. Germany, however, turned in a dominant performance against Portugal in the third place match, winning 3–1 with two Bastian Schweinsteiger goals.

Besides a focus on attacking football and youth development, Klinsmann's staff also introduced an alternative B-team: Team 2006, to experiment with new aspiring players suitable to play at the home World Cup. Also introduced were an enhanced fitness coaching staff, as well as Oliver Bierhoff as "Business Manager" – this job revolves around public relations, general management and everything not directly related to coaching – and a mental coach, Dr. Hans-Dieter Hermann, who has the job of preparing the German players for stressful situations in major tournaments.

=== 2006–2021: Germany manager ===
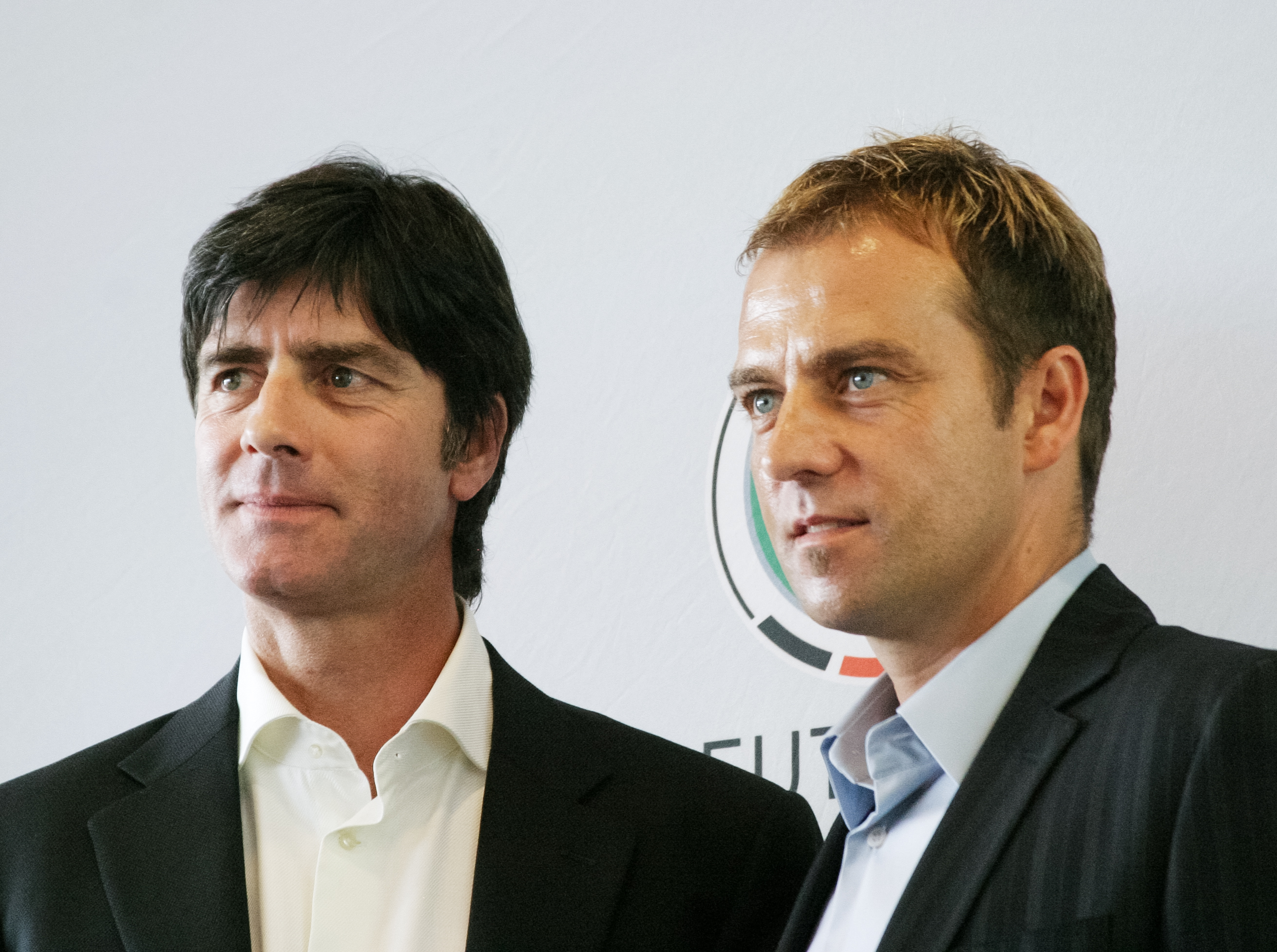
Löw and his assistant Hansi Flick in 2006

==== Euro 2008 ====
On 12 July 2006, following Klinsmann's decision not to renew his contract, Löw was named as the new manager of Germany. Löw obtained a contract for two years and announced that he wanted to continue in the philosophy developed with Klinsmann to play with an offensive style. Löw was particularly concerned with the amount of time his players hold on to the ball before passing. During his tenure, he reduced this time significantly, increasing the pace of the German game. He declared that his aim was to win Euro 2008. His first game in charge, a friendly against Sweden in Gelsenkirchen on 16 August 2006, was a 3–0 success in which Miroslav Klose scored twice and Bernd Schneider scored the other.

Löw had a successful start in qualifying for Euro 2008 with wins over the Republic of Ireland and San Marino. On 7 October 2006, Germany won 2–0 against Georgia in the Ostseestadion in Rostock, which was the fourth consecutive success for Löw and his team, the best start of a new head coach of the Germany national team ever. The team extended this record to five wins in the next match, the Euro 2008 qualifier against Slovakia in Bratislava on 11 October, with a 4–1 victory. The Slovaks' strike was the first goal conceded by Germany under Löw's reign.

The next match saw the end of Löw's perfect record, with the qualifying match on 15 November in Nicosia against Cyprus ending in a disappointing 1–1 draw. 2007 started with a 3–1 win against Switzerland on 7 February and a 2–1 win against the Czech Republic on 24 March. Löw's first loss as manager came in his eighth game on 28 March 2007, an experimental squad lost 0–1 against Denmark. He had given Robert Enke and Patrick Helmes their debuts. When qualification for Euro 2008 was ensured, Löw's record stood at 11 wins, 1 loss and 1 draw from 13 matches and a 41:6 goal difference. This includes the first win over England in London's new Wembley Stadium. Germany lost to the Czech Republic in qualifying on 17 October 2007. This was the second loss for Löw. Germany finished qualifying in second place. In the final match of 2007, Germany and Wales finished in a 0–0 draw.

Germany started 2008 with 3–0 win against Austria on 6 February and a 4–0 win against Switzerland on 26 March. Then Germany and Belarus finished in a 2–2 draw. Germany had a 2–0 lead at half–time. In their final match before Euro 2008, Germany defeated Serbia 2–1. At Euro 2008, Germany defeated Poland 2–0 in their first game, with two goals from Lukas Podolski. In their second game, Germany were beaten 2–1 by Croatia, while in their final group game, against Austria, Löw was sent to the stands by the referee Manuel Mejuto González – along with his Austrian counterpart Josef Hickersberger – for arguing with the fourth official. Following his dismissal, he was seen talking to Chancellor of Germany Angela Merkel about the incident. Nonetheless, Germany won the match 1–0 with a goal from Michael Ballack to progress to the quarter-finals as runners up because of their earlier loss to Croatia.

Löw changed the 4–4–2 system after the group stages to a 4–2–3–1 system, and left striker Mario Gómez out of the starting lineup. Though he was forced to watch from the sidelines, his team defeated Portugal 3–2. In the quarter-final, Löw was banned from giving any directions to his team even through telephone calls. Later Löw declared that he had put seven different scenarios with his assistant Hansi Flick in order to contain Portugal. Germany won 3–2 against Turkey in the semi-finals. Germany then lost 1–0 to Spain in the final on 29 June 2008.

==== 2010 World Cup ====
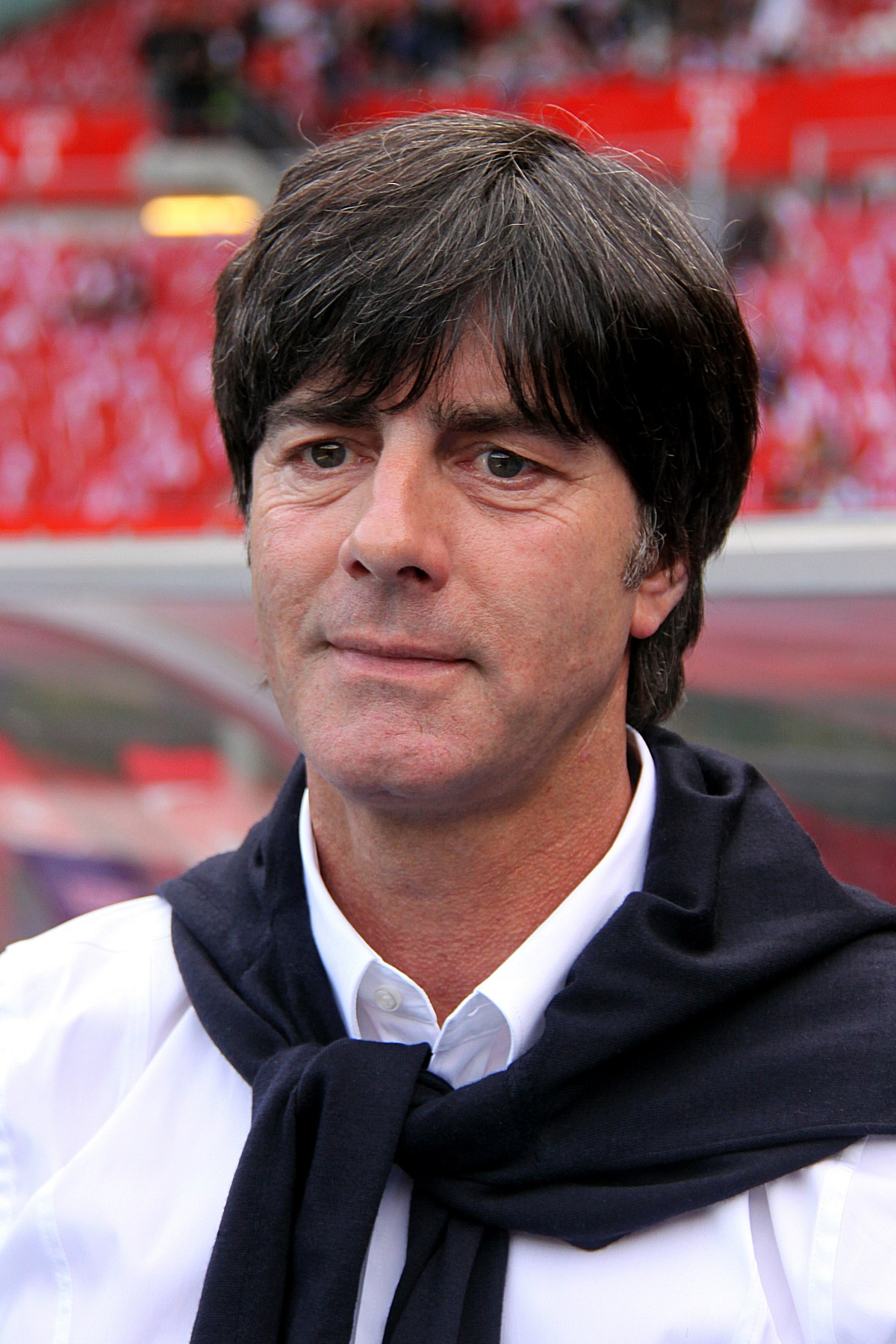
Löw in 2011

Further progress was evident in qualifying for South Africa as Germany booked their place at the 2010 World Cup undefeated. In their penultimate match on 10 October 2009, Germany secured first place in their qualifying group for the 2010 World Cup by beating second placed Russia in Moscow 1–0, sending Guus Hiddink's side into playoffs.

In the 2010 World Cup, Löw introduced new young players and fielded the second youngest team of the tournament, Germany's youngest since 1934. Germany topped Group D and met England in the first round of the knockout stage, beating them 4–1 before defeating Argentina 4–0 in the quarter-finals. Germany then lost the semi-final to Spain 1–0. On 10 July 2010, they went on to win the third place play-off against Uruguay by 3–2 to collect the bronze medals and third place at the 2010 World Cup.

==== Euro 2012 ====
Germany qualified for Euro 2012 and topped their group with ten wins out of ten matches. This includes a 4–0 win against Kazakhstan and a 6–2 win against Austria. During the qualification campaign, Löw signed a new contract that would keep him with Germany until 2014. Germany then proceeded to top their group in the tournament, the only team to win all three of their group matches as they defeated Portugal 1–0, the Netherlands 2–1, and Denmark 2–1. In the quarter-finals, Germany beat Greece 4–2, but were eliminated in the semi-finals following a 2–1 loss to Italy.

==== 2014 World Cup ====
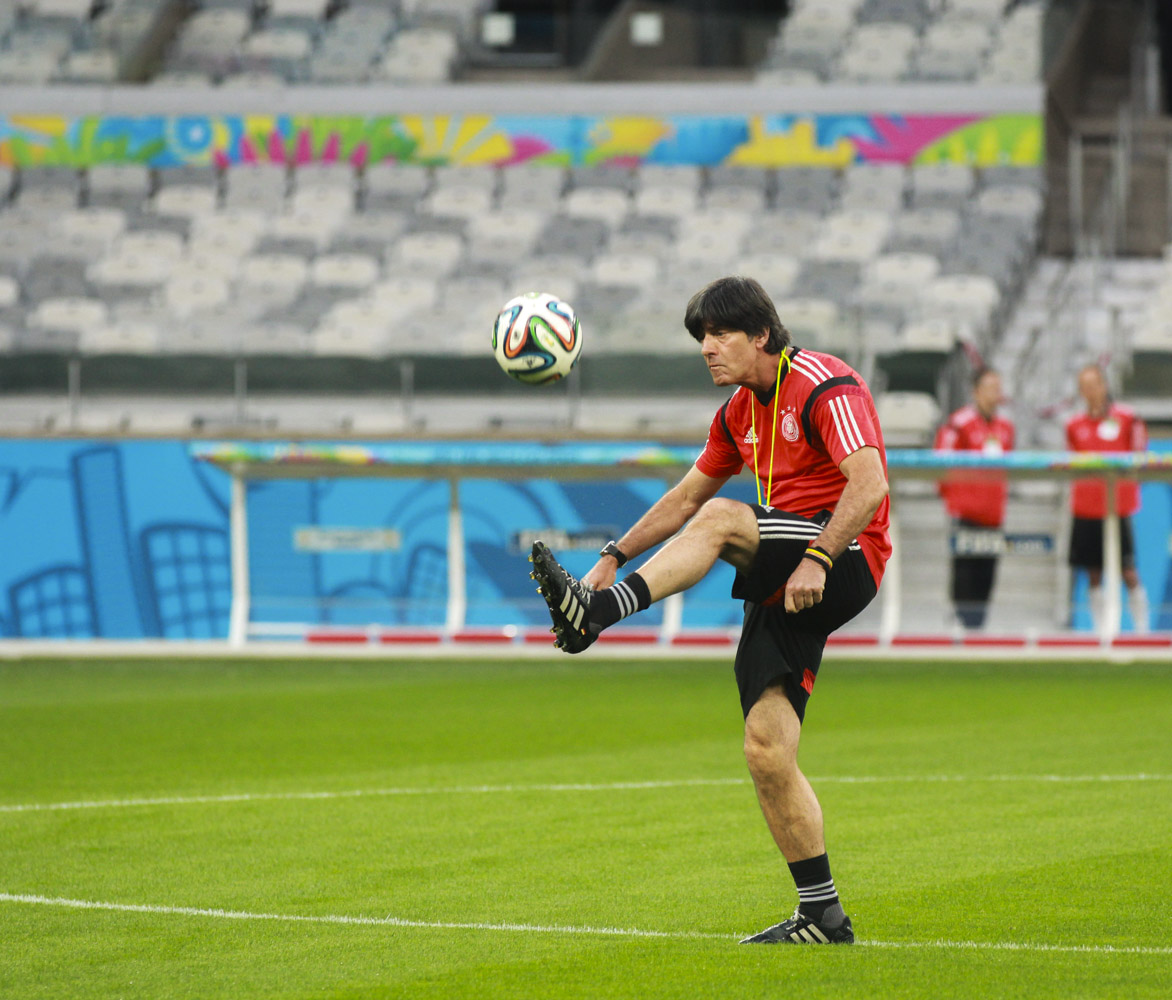
Löw at the 2014 FIFA World Cup

Germany started qualification with a 3–0 win against the Faroe Islands. Germany won their first match in 2013 2–1 against France. After qualifying they started their 2014 World Cup group stage with a 4–0 victory over Portugal. In the second game, against Ghana, Germany came from behind to draw the match 2–2, while in the third match, Germany beat the United States – led by former German coach Jürgen Klinsmann – 1–0, with the lone goal scored by Thomas Müller. In the second round match against Algeria, Löw's tactics were called into question after playing a high defensive line allowing Algeria to break through on numerous occasions. Nonetheless, Germany won 2–1 after extra time, thereby setting up a quarter-final clash with France. Germany edged France 1–0 with a goal from Borussia Dortmund centre-back Mats Hummels in the 12th minute.

In the semi-final, Germany defeated hosts Brazil 7–1 to reach the tournament's final; the result was Brazil's worst defeat in FIFA World Cup history. Löw led Germany to their fourth World Cup title win with a Mario Götze goal in the 112th minute to get Die Mannschaft the victory in extra time against Argentina in the final. The same year he won the FIFA World Coach Of The Year Award after receiving 36.23 % votes and finished ahead of Carlo Ancelotti who got 22.06 % votes.

==== Euro 2016 ====
Germany started Euro 2016 qualifying with a 2–1 win against Scotland. Then Germany lost to Poland, 2–0. Germany had 28 shots in the match and the result put them in fourth place. Germany tied the Republic of Ireland 1–1 on 14 October 2014; John O'Shea had scored the equalizer for Ireland in the fourth minute of stoppage time. In the following month, meanwhile, Germany defeated Gibraltar 4–0. On 13 March 2015, Löw signed a contract extension until 2018. On 29 March 2015, Germany defeated Georgia 2–0, Germany remained in second place. and on 10 June, in a friendly match, Germany lost 2–1 to the United States. This was the first victory for the U.S. in Germany. Germany defeated Gibraltar 7–0 on 13 June 2015 and Poland 3–1 on 4 September 2015. Three days later, Germany again defeated Scotland, but on 8 October 2015, Ireland would defeat Germany 1–0. Germany finished off qualifying with a 2–1 win against Georgia.

In the lead up to the final tournament, Germany faced France, England, Italy Slovakia, and Hungary. France defeated Germany 2–0 on 13 November 2015, England defeated Germany 3–2 on 26 March 2016 and three days later, Germany would defeat Italy 4–1, marking the first time since 1995 that Germany had defeated Italy. Slovakia defeated Germany 3–1 on 31 May 2016. In their final match before the start of the tournament, Germany defeated Hungary 2–0.

In the tournament proper, Germany were grouped into Group C alongside Ukraine, Poland and Northern Ireland. Germany defeated Ukraine (2–0) and Northern Ireland (1–0), while it tied Poland (0–0). Finishing level on seven points with Poland but with a superior goal differential, Germany qualified for the round of 16 as Group C winners. At this stage they would defeat Slovakia 3–0 on 26 June 2016, setting up a quarter-final match against Italy on 2 July. After the match finished in a 1–1 draw, Germany advanced to the semi-finals after winning the shootout, matching up with tournament hosts France. France would defeat Germany 2–0, inflicting its first loss on Germany in a major tournament for the first time since 1958. Despite losing, Löw thought that Germany were the "better team" in the match.

During this time, Löw was a part of a collaboration between the German Football Association and The LEGO Group, who in May 2016 released a Europe-exclusive collectible minifigure series, with Löw featured as the first of sixteen minifigures in the collection.

==== 2017 FIFA Confederations Cup ====
Germany started their 2017 FIFA Confederations Cup mission with a 3–2 victory over Australia in their first group stage match. In the next match, Germany ended with a 1–1 draw over Chile. Germany then won against Cameroon with a 3–1 victory in their last group stage match and sealed their place in the semi-final. This victory meant the 100th Victory for Germany under his coaching.

Germany faced Mexico in the semi-final and defeated them with a 4–1 victory to make it to the final for the first time in the tournament. On 2 July 2017, Löw led Germany to their FIFA Confederations Cup title win for the first time after a 1–0 victory against Chile in the final at the Krestovsky Stadium in Saint Petersburg.

==== 2018 World Cup ====
After Euro 2016, Löw opted to stay on as Germany manager. Germany were drawn into Group C alongside the Czech Republic, Northern Ireland, Norway, Azerbaijan and San Marino for 2018 World Cup qualifying. On 15 May 2018, he extended his contract with Germany until 2022.

Germany lost their first group match 0–1 against Mexico. Löw played a 4–2–3–1 formation but allowed right-back Joshua Kimmich to attack that flank, giving Mexico space on that side. Moreover, playing two defensive midfielders but having them to push forward in attack left the German backline vulnerable to the Mexican counter. Germany went on to defeat Sweden with a 2–1 victory. Germany were eliminated in the first round of the World Cup for the first time since 1938, and encountered its first ever group stage exit after losing 2–0 to South Korea. Of the previous 5 World Cup winners, Germany was the fourth defending champion to exit in the group stage of their title defense (the other instances being France in 2002, Italy in 2010, Spain in 2014).

==== UEFA Nations League and Euro 2020 ====
Löw decided to stay on as national team coach despite the group stage exit from the World Cup. The nation's losses in 2018 continued; Germany were set to be relegated from the top tier of the inaugural UEFA Nations League, but stayed in League A after UEFA elected to change the number of teams in each tier. Later on, Germany finished second in Group A4 in the 2020–21 UEFA Nations League following a 0–6 defeat to Spain in the final group match in November 2020. It was Germany's worst defeat since May 1931, when they lost 0–6 at home against Austria.

On 9 March 2021, Löw announced that he would step down from his role as Germany manager following Euro 2020. On 29 June 2021, England beat Germany in the round of 16 of Euro 2020, thus eliminating Germany from the tournament. This defeat also marked the end of Löw's tenure as Germany's coach. His tenure of nearly 15 years is the longest for an international coach in Europe. He was replaced by his former assistant manager, Hansi Flick.

== Personal life ==
Löw is Roman Catholic and was an altar boy in his early life.

He has been married to Daniela Löw since 1986; they have no children. The couple met in 1978 and dated for eight years before they got married.

Löw has lost his driver's licence twice, once in 2006 (for one month) and once in 2014 (for six months) because of excessive speed and using a mobile phone while driving.

Löw has been supporting SOS Humanity, a German non-governmental organization dedicated to the private rescue of refugees in distress at sea in the Mediterranean, since 2025. In December 2025, he launched a campaign to finance a new rescue ship.

== Managerial statistics ==
As of match played 29 June 2021

Team	From	To	Record								
Team	From	To	M	W	D	L	GF	GA	GD	Win %	Ref.
VfB Stuttgart	14 August 1996	21 May 1998	89	46	20	23	172	107	+65	51.69	
Fenerbahçe	1 July 1998	30 May 1999	38	24	6	8	88	34	+54	63.16	
Karlsruher SC	25 October 1999	19 April 2000	18	1	7	10	14	28	−14	5.56	
Adanaspor	20 December 2000	2 March 2001	6	0	2	4	9	14	−5	0.00	
Tirol Innsbruck	10 October 2001	18 June 2002	27	13	5	9	33	24	+9	48.15	
Austria Wien	1 July 2003	24 March 2004	32	16	8	8	45	24	+21	50.00	
Germany	12 July 2006	29 June 2021	198	124	40	34	467	200	+267	62.63	
Total			407	223	88	96	826	430	+396	54.79	—

== Honours ==
=== Managerial ===
VfB Stuttgart

- DFB-Pokal: 1996–97
- UEFA Cup Winners' Cup runner-up: 1997–98

Tirol Innsbruck

- Austrian Football Bundesliga: 2001–02

Austria Wien

- Austrian Supercup: 2003

Fenerbahçe

- Atatürk Cup: 1998

Germany

- FIFA World Cup: 2014; third place: 2010
- UEFA European Championship runner-up: 2008
- FIFA Confederations Cup: 2017

Individual

- Sport Bild German Sports Manager of the Year: 2010
- German Football Man of the Year: 2011, 2014
- German Football Manager of the Year: 2014
- FIFA World Coach of the Year: 2014
- World Soccer Awards Manager of the Year: 2014
- IFFHS World's Best National Coach: 2014, 2017
- L'Équipe Sports Manager of the Year: 2010
- FIFA World Cup Dream Team: 2014
- IFFHS World's Best Man National Coach of the Decade: 2011–2020

Orders

- Silbernes Lorbeerblatt: 2006, 2010, 2014
- Bundesverdienstkreuz am Bande: 2010

== See also ==
- National team managers with 100 or more matches
