= Ursula Sladek =

German environmentalist (born 1946)

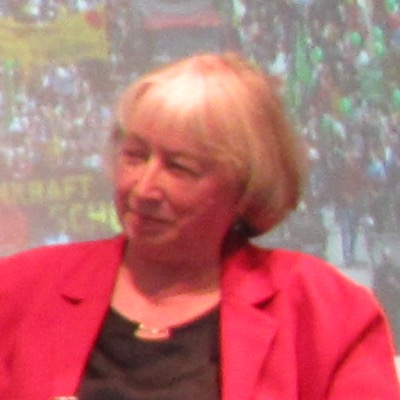
- Sladek in 2012
- Born: 1946 (age 79–80)
- Occupation: Environmentalist
- Known for: Schönau Power Supply Company
- Spouse: Michael Sladek (died 2024)
- Children: 5
- Awards: 2011 Goldman Environmental Prize; 2013 German Energy Prize; German Federal Cross of Merit; The Henry Ford European Conservation Award; European Solar Prize

Ursula Sladek (born 1946) is a German environmentalist. Following the 1986 Chernobyl disaster, she founded Schönau Electricity Works, which provides electricity from renewable sources.

== Background ==
Sladek was born in 1946. She was trained as a school teacher. At the time of the Chernobyl disaster, she was a homemaker and mother to five school-age children in Schönau. Following the disaster, she began studying the energy industry in Germany to search for ways to decrease dependence on nuclear power. Together with her husband, Michael Sladek, she formed a group called "Parents for a Nuclear Free Future" to promote energy efficiency in the Black Forest region of Germany and return control of energy production and distribution to the community. By 1991, this movement grew to a nationwide fundraising effort to enable Sladek's group to take ownership of the local power grid when the previous power company's lease to supply power to the Schönau region was up for renewal. The group raised DM6 million (about €3 million) and by 1997 had established the Schönau Power Supply, EWS Elektrizitätswerke Schönau eG, a Eingetragene Genossenschaft (registered cooperative society), as a community-operated energy provider committed to a sustainable energy future. She suggested to the mayor of Schönau that the Schönau Power Supply take over control of the local grid.

The Schönau Power Supply uses a decentralized approach to power generation and renewable energy sources, including solar, hydroelectric, wind power, and biomass. The company is operated as a cooperative; while the cooperative owners receive dividends, the majority of the profits are re-invested in renewable energy sources. Total revenues reached €67 million in 2009.

== Awards and recognition ==
Sladek has won a number of awards for her work in the fields of energy conservation and renewable energy production. These include the German Federal Cross of Merit, the Henry Ford European Conservation Award, the German Founder of the Year Award, the International Nuclear-Free Future Award, the German Energy Prize, the European Solar Prize, and in 2011 she won the Goldman Environmental Prize. In 2008, Sladek was elected to the Ashoka Fellowship.
