= Siegwart Horst Günther =

Professor Siegwart Horst Günther (24 February 1925 in Halle (Saale) – 16 January 2015) was a German physician and activist. He once worked with Albert Schweitzer in Africa. He was a prominent proponent of the claim that the use of depleted uranium in munitions causes cancers, birth defects and other pathologies. In 2007 the Nuclear-Free Future Award honored for the third time Prof. Günther for refusing to back down to pressure and for visiting Iraq to study the real-life consequences of depleted uranium use.

== See also ==
- Nuclear-Free Future Award
- Hartmut Gründler
- The Doctor, the Depleted Uranium, and the Dying Children—An award-winning documentary film produced for German television, streaming on YouTube
- An obituary of Günther from the International Coalition to Ban Uranium Weapons Archived by the Wayback Machine 19 March 2015.
