= Michael Sladek =

German environmentalist (1946–2024)

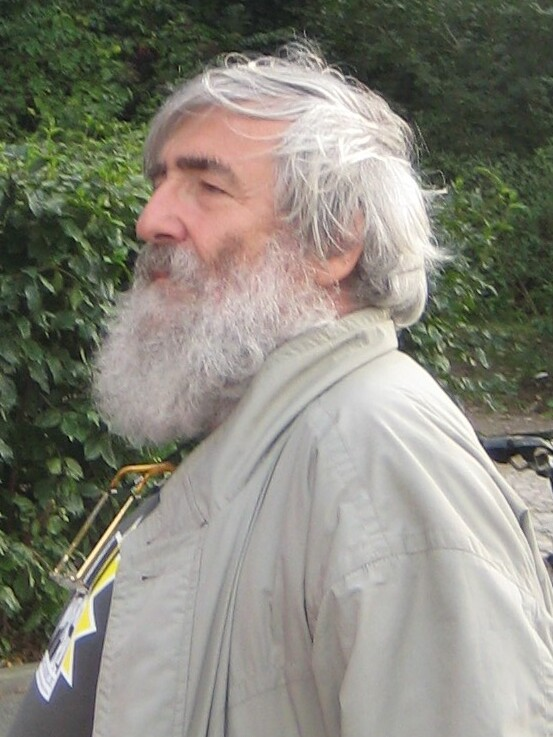
- Sladek in 2010
- Born: 1 October 1946; Murrhardt, Württemberg-Baden, Allied-occupied Germany
- Died: 24 September 2024 (aged 77); Schönau, Baden-Württemberg, Germany
- Occupations: Physician; Environmentalist
- Known for: Schönau Power Supply Company
- Spouse: Ursula Sladek
- Children: 5
- Awards: Nuclear-Free Future Award; German Federal Cross of Merit

Michael Sladek (1 October 1946 – 24 September 2024) was a German physician and environmentalist. After the Chernobyl disaster, he and his wife, Ursula Sladek, initiated a movement in their hometown Schönau im Schwarzwald to become independent of nuclear energy, achieving that goal in 1997.

== Life and career ==
Sladek was born in Murrhardt on 1 October 1946. He studied medicine at the University of Freiburg and became a physician in general medicine in Schönau in 1977. He and his wife Ursula, a former primary school teacher, had three children; two more children were born in Schönau.

After the 1986 Chernobyl disaster, the Sladeks and a small group of others founded the Parents for a Nuclear Free Future group, to research how they could limit the community's dependence on nuclear power. Their first approach was on saving energy and getting others to save energy. They reactivated small hydropower plants in the region. The couple developed the idea of a power system independent of nuclear power plants, generating electric power through distributed mini power plants from renewable sources. After ten years of campaigning and raising awareness, they founded the first German green power utility, the Elektrizitätswerke Schönau (EWS), in 1994. They took over providing power for the community in 1997. With a system that combined efficiency and power-saving strategies, it became possible to satisfy the power consumption of the community. Schönau was the first community in a Western country that became independent of the national power grid and could decide how its power would be produced. In 2015 he and his wife left the leadership of EWS, succeeded by two of their sons.

Sladek became famous as the Schönauer Stromrebell ("electricity rebel"). He was awarded the 1996 WWF Umweltpreis "Öko-Manager des Jahres" from the German magazine Capital. In 1999 he and his wife were awarded the Nuclear-Free Future Award. In January 2004, the Sladeks were awarded the highest order in Germany, the Federal Cross of Merit, for their involvement with the environment.

Following a severe illness, Sladek died on 24 September 2024, a week before his 78th birthday.

== Honours ==
- 1999: Nuclear-Free Future Award, together with his wife
- 2004: Federal Cross of Merit, together with his wife
- 2007: German Founder Award
- 2012: Order of Merit of the State of Baden-Württemberg, together with his wife
