= Hermann Behmel =

German geologist, paleontologist and ecological activist

Hermann Behmel (born 28 June 1939) is a German geologist, paleontologist and ecological activist.

== Education and professional life ==
Behmel, son of architect Paul Behmel of Zittau and grandson of photographer and entrepreneur Josef Behmel studied at the Universities of Stuttgart, Hohenheim, York and Tübingen and wrote a dissertation in 1969 about paleographic ecosystems in Spain. He worked as a long term consultant for NATO in Newcastle, England, and Torino, Italy, and was head of Department at Universität Stuttgart, Institute for Geology and Paleontology.

== Personal life ==
Behmel grew up in Horb and Freudenstadt in the Black Forest with four siblings. He moved to Stuttgart in 1970. He is married and has two sons, Martin and writer Albrecht Behmel. He was a prominent opponent of the Neckarwestheim Nuclear Power Plant frequently appearing on TV and in the papers

== Bibliography ==
- Tschernobyl liegt nebenan: Dokumente des Widerstands - Bedenken, Einwände, Argumente zum Atomkraftwerk Neckarwestheim von Hermann Behmel, Peter Grohmann, Ulrich Jochimsen und Alexander Riffler, 1988.
- Wüsten, Meere und Vulkane. Baden-Württemberg in Bildern aus der Erdgeschichte. Geologische Uhr und Landschaftsmodell von Christine Stier, Hermann Behmel und Uli Schollenberger, 1989.
- Landschaftsgeschichte - Landesplanung in: Wechselwirkungen- Jahrbuch 1990 der Universität Stuttgart, 1991.
- Stratigraphie und Fazies im präbetischen Jura von Albacete und Nord-Murcia : (Mit 15 Abb. u. 2 Tab. im Text u. auf 1 Beil), 1969.
- Reader's digest Atlas Deutschland (Beitr. Hermann Behmel (Geologie); edited by Joachim Zeller), 1998.
