= Mitte 3 =

State electoral district of Germany

- Electoral district for the Berlin House of Representatives
- Mitte 3 in 2026
- District: Mitte
- Electorate: 30,837 (2026)

Current electoral district
- Party: Green
- Member: Jian Omar

Mitte 3 is an electoral constituency (German: Wahlkreis) represented in the House of Representatives of Berlin. It elects one member via first-past-the-post voting.

== Geography ==
The constituency comprises the areas of Southern Moabit, Hansaviertel, and Greater Tiergarten within the borough of Mitte.

There were 29,937 eligible voters in 2023.

== Members ==
Election	Member	Party	%
2006	SPD	Jutta Koch-Unterseher	38.0
2011	SPD	Thomas Isenberg	30.7
2016	SPD	Thomas Isenberg	27.9
2021	Greens	Jian Omar	31.9
2023	Greens	Jian Omar	33.0
2026	Greens	Jian Omar	29.0

== Election results ==
=== 2026 election ===
State election (2026): Mitte 3
Notes:	Blue background denotes the winner of the electorate vote. Pink background denotes a candidate elected from their party list. Yellow background denotes an electorate win by a list member, or other incumbent. A ✓ or ✗ denotes status of any incumbent, win or lose respectively.						
Party	Candidate	Votes	%	±%	Party votes	%	±%
Greens	✓ Jian Omar	6,647	29.0	▼4.0	4,990	21.7	▼6.4
Left	Tobias Schulze	5,615	24.5	▲13.3	6,538	28.4	▲16.0
CDU	Sylvia Ganz	3,938	17.2	▼5.1	4,100	17.8	▼4.4
SPD	Lucy Merle Demers	2,997	13.1	▼5.6	2,978	12.9	▼5.5
AfD	Steffen Lent	1,726	7.5	▲2.9	1,768	7.7	▲3.0
BSW	Erdinç Kardaşlar	771	3.4		889	3.9	
FDP	Gabriele Cocozza	596	2.6	▼2.7	620	2.7	▼3.4
Volt	Ferdinand Tiffert	522	2.3		591	2.6	▲1.0
Tierschutzpartei					308	1.3	▼0.4
PARTEI					141	0.6	▼0.8
MERA25	Sophie Asmus	71	0.3				
PdF					49	0.2	
ÖDP					25	0.1	Steady
DKP					18	0.1	Steady
du.					12	0.1	▼0.1
SGP					7	0.0	Steady
Informal votes		312			161		
Total valid votes		22,883			23,034		
Turnout		23,195	75.2	▲11.9			
Greens hold	Majority	1,032	4.5	▼6.2			

=== 2023 repeat election ===
Changes denoted below for the 2023 election are compared to the 2016 election, as the 2021 election was declared invalid.

State election (2023): Mitte 3
Notes:	Blue background denotes the winner of the electorate vote. Pink background denotes a candidate elected from their party list. Yellow background denotes an electorate win by a list member, or other incumbent. A ✓ or ✗ denotes status of any incumbent, win or lose respectively.						
Party	Candidate	Votes	%	±%	Party votes	%	±%
Greens	✓ Jian Omar	6,207	33.0	▲6.8	5,281	28.1	▲3.7
CDU	Gabriele Cocozza	4,196	22.3	▲6.5	4,185	22.2	▲6.7
SPD	Thomas Isenberg	3,505	18.6	▼7.6	3,465	18.4	▼3.6
Left	Anne Helm	2,119	11.3	▲0.8	2,336	12.4	▼0.8
FDP	Tim Stuchtey	1,000	5.3	▼1.8	1,151	6.1	▼2.4
AfD	Carsten Riedel	879	4.7	▼4.1	875	4.6	▼4.3
Tierschutzpartei	Pia Pötschke	391	2.1		318	1.7	▲0.3
Volt					302	1.6	
PARTEI	Nils Waschner	348	1.9	▼0.1	262	1.4	▼0.6
Team Todenhöfer					94	0.5	
dieBasis	Norman Röwe	108	0.6		78	0.4	
Pirates					72	0.4	▼1.5
Klimaliste					59	0.3	
Mieterpartei					51	0.3	
Independent	Bernd Elmenthaler	41	0.2				
FW					41	0.2	
du.					37	0.2	
The Grays					31	0.2	
Humanists					30	0.2	
Gray Panthers					26	0.1	▼0.5
DKP					23	0.1	▼0.1
ÖDP					21	0.1	
Bergpartei, die ÜberPartei					20	0.1	
Bildet Berlin!					16	0.1	
Verjüngungsforschung					14	0.1	▼0.2
SGP					9	0.0	▼0.1
The Pinks/Alliance 21					8	0.0	
NPD					7	0.0	▼0.2
BüSo					4	0.0	Steady
LKR					4	0.0	▼0.3
Informal votes		127			116		
Total valid votes		18,794			18,820		
Turnout		18,952	63.3	▼3.9			
Greens gain from SPD	Majority	2,101	10.7				

=== 2021 election (annulled) ===
The election in 2021 was annulled and rerun in 2023.

State election (2021): Mitte 3
Notes:	Blue background denotes the winner of the electorate vote. Pink background denotes a candidate elected from their party list. Yellow background denotes an electorate win by a list member, or other incumbent. A ✓ or ✗ denotes status of any incumbent, win or lose respectively.						
Party	Candidate	Votes	%	±%	Party votes	%	±%
Greens	✓ Jian Omar	7,208	31.9	▲5.7	6,399	28.3	▲4.0
SPD	✗ Thomas Isenberg	4,977	22.0	▼4.2	4,528	20.0	▼2.0
CDU	Gabriele Cocozza	3,560	15.8	Steady	3,399	15.0	▼0.5
Left	Anne Helm	2,875	12.7	▲2.3	3,060	13.5	▲0.4
FDP	Tim Stuchtey	1,787	7.9	▲0.8	1,831	8.1	▼0.4
AfD	Carsten Riedel	865	3.8	▼5.0	876	3.9	▼5.1
Volt					444	2.0	
Tierschutzpartei	Pia Pötschke	461	2.0		284	1.3	▼0.1
PARTEI	Nils Waschner	450	2.0	Steady	366	1.6	▼0.4
Team Todenhöfer					365	1.6	
dieBasis	Norman Röwe	337	1.5		256	1.1	
Klimaliste					131	0.6	
FW					104	0.5	
Pirates					75	0.3	▼1.6
Humanists					65	0.3	
The Grays					65	0.3	
Gray Panthers					60	0.3	▼0.3
Independent	Bernd Elmenthaler	58	0.3				
Mieterpartei					48	0.2	
du.					47	0.2	
Verjüngungsforschung					37	0.2	▼0.1
APT					54	0.2	
ÖDP					29	0.1	
Bildet Berlin!					25	0.3	
Bergpartei, die ÜberPartei					20	0.1	
NPD					15	0.1	▼0.2
DKP					14	0.1	▼0.2
The Pinks/Alliance 21					9	0.0	
SGP					6	0.0	▼0.1
LKR					5	0.0	▼0.3
BüSo					3	0.0	Steady
Informal votes		281			197		
Total valid votes		22,578			22,620		
Turnout		22,892	77.1	▲9.9			
Greens gain from SPD	Majority	2,231	9.9				

== See also ==
- Politics of Berlin
- House of Representatives of Berlin
