= L'Ingénu =

1767 novella by Voltaire

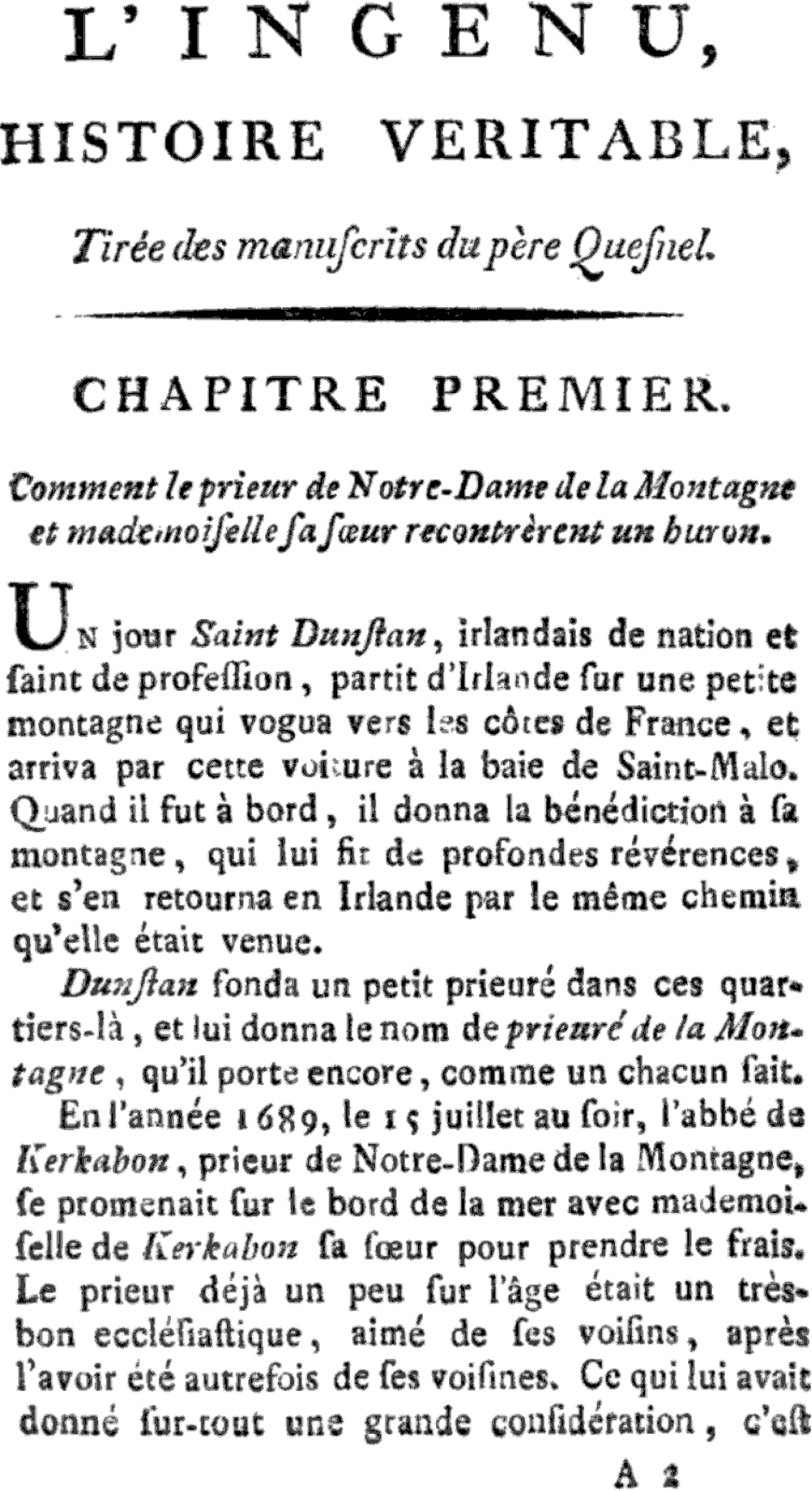
- Author: Voltaire
- Original title: L'Ingénu
- Language: French
- Genre: Novel conte philosophique
- Publication date: 1767
- Publication place: France
- Media type: Print

L'Ingénu (US: /ˌlɑːnʒəˈnuː/ LAHN-zhə-NOO, UK: /ˈlænʒeɪnjuː/ LAN-zhay-new, French: [lɛ̃ʒeny]), sometimes subtitled The Sincere Huron in English, is a satirical novella written by the French philosopher Voltaire, and published in 1767.

== Overview ==
The work tells the story of a Huron "child of nature" who, after having crossed the Atlantic to England, crosses into Brittany, France, in the 1690s. Upon arrival, a prior notices depictions of the "Child of Nature"'s brother and sister-in-law, whom the priory deduce to be the Huron child's parents; the priory assumes, thenceforth, that this must make him French. He then is christened with the name Hercules de Kerkabon (Hercule de Kerkabon).

Having grown up outside of European culture, the Huron sees the world in a more 'natural' way, causing him to interpret things directly. He is unaware of what is customary, leading to comic misinterpretations. After reading the Bible he feels he should be circumcised, and calls upon a surgeon to perform the operation, which is stopped through the intervention of his 'family'. After his first confession, he tries to force the priest to confess as well, since he interprets a biblical verse to mean confessions must be made mutually and not exempting the clergy. Not expecting to be baptized in a church, the Child of Nature is found waiting in a stream, as that is how baptisms are depicted in the Bible. The story satirises religious doctrine, government corruption, and the folly and injustices of French society, including its practices that conflict with actual scripture.

The story also criticizes the contemporary corruption in the French government. First, the Child of Nature, on his way to receive accolades for helping fight off a British amphibious assault, is wrongly imprisoned as a Jansenist after he shows sympathy to the plight of those fleeing religious persecution. He spends a great deal of time in prison, until his lover–after having been sent to a convent for four years–journeys to Versailles to find out his plight. To do so, she must make use of back channels, such as the wife of a confessor.

Ultimately, to secure her lover's release, the woman must succumb to the advances of a government minister. She seeks guidance from the confessor, but he says she must have misunderstood the minister's deal and that whatever he was intimating, it must be for the best since the minister is related to Louis XIV's confessor. The episode suggests not only the personal corruption in the French government, but also the corrupt interplay of secular and religious institutions. She eventually gives in for the sake of her lover, but dies of an illness shortly after they are reunited.

== Context ==
L'Ingénu is a mix of genres, sharing characteristics with the conte philosophique, the apologue and the novel.

Throughout L'Ingénu, Voltaire advocates deism, and lambastes religious intolerance, fanaticism, superstitions, sects and the Catholic clergy.
