= Irina Nakhova =

Russian painter

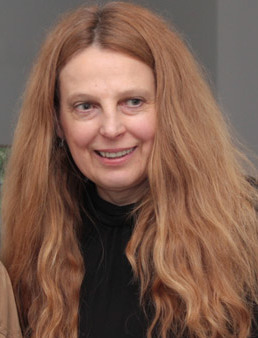
- Irina Nakhova in 2011
- Born: 1955 (age 70–71)
- Education: Graphic Design Department of the Moscow Polygraphic Institute
- Known for: Painting, Interactive Installation, Video, Audio, Mixed Media
- Movement: Moscow Conceptualists, Soviet Nonconformist Art, Feminist art
- Website: https://nakhova.com

Irina Isayevna Nakhova (Russian: Ирина Исаевна Нахова; born 1955 in Moscow) is an artist who has worked and lived between Moscow and the United States since 1989. Nakhova is a painter and installation artist. Her installations employ painting, sculpture, digital printing, video, and audio. In 2013, she won the prestigious Kandinsky Prize for her installation, Without A Title. In 2015, Nakhova became the first woman to have a solo exhibit in the Russian Pavilion at the Venice Biennial. She is represented by Nailya Alexander Gallery in New York City. Nakhova currently lives and works in New Jersey and Moscow.

== Career ==
Nakhova graduated from the Graphic Design Department of the Moscow Polygraphic Institute in 1978. She was a member of the Union of Artists of the USSR from 1986 to 1989 as an illustrator. Nakhova is considered one of the original members of the "school" of Moscow Conceptualism, which included friends and colleagues Andrei Monastyrskyi, Lev Rubinstein, Vladimir Sorokin, Viktor Pivovarov, Ilya Kabakov, Dmitrii Prigov, and others. Nakhova received international recognition as a young artist for Rooms (1983–1987), the first "total installation" in Russian art, located in her Moscow apartment.

In 1988, Nakhova was one of the youngest artists included in Sotheby's first auction in Moscow. The "groundbreaking" auction, titled "Avant-Garde and Soviet Art", realized more than $3,000,000 USD and marked a major step forward in the opening of Russian art to Western European and American markets. Nakhova's work caught the attention of American gallerist Phyllis Kind, who gave the artist three solo shows in New York in the early 1990s, Nakhova's first exhibitions in the United States.

In 2011, Nakhova was featured as a special guest of the Fourth Moscow Biennale of Contemporary Art at the Moscow Museum of Modern Art. As part of a large-scale retrospective of Nakhova's work, her seminal installation Room No. 2 (1983–1987) was reproduced. This installation was also recreated for Tate Modern, London in 2019 for the exhibit Performer and Participant.

In 2013, Nakhova was awarded the Kandinsky Prize in the category of Project of the Year, for her work Without A Title. Nakhova described Without A Title as "my reckoning with history as comprehended through the history of my family – my grandfather (who was executed), grandmother, mother, father, and my past self. This is my attempt to understand the inexplicable state of affairs that has reigned in my country for the last century, and to understand through private imagery how millions of people were erased from history and happily forgotten; how people have been blinded and their souls destroyed so that they can live without memory and history."

In 2015, Nakhova became the first woman to represent Russia in a solo pavilion at the Venice Biennale. The Green Pavilion was a complex of four different rooms that employed monumental sculpture, video, and painting, together with the building’s architecture and the viewer’s perspective. Nakhova states in the exhibit’s catalog, “Every space of the pavilion contains references to the future or the past, or a concentration on the present, as in the central room, where we simultaneously observe what’s happening under our feet and what’s transpiring up in the sky.”

"Based on a dialogue with the pavilion structure itself, designed by Aleksei Shchusev in 1914, The Green Pavilion relates to installation art as much as it does to architecture," writes Stella Kesaeva, President of Stella Art Foundation, in the catalogue for the installation. "As with [Vadim] Zakharov's project, the architectural features of the pavilion comprise an important component of Nakhova's installation. This time, an opening has again been created between the first and second floors of Schusev's building, plus the exterior is painted green. The result: the Russian Pavilion takes on the appearance of a romantic gazebo, while concealing within itself the spatial metaphor of Kazimir Malevich's Black Square (1915)."

In 2019, Nakhova had her first museum retrospective in the United States, Irina Nakhova: Museum on the Edge, an exhibit of paintings and installations at The Zimmerli Museum, Rutgers University, New Brunswick NJ. According to Dr. Jane Sharp, curator of the exhibition, “Nakhova’s highly mediated and manipulated images challenge the limits of our own investment in the past. They cause the viewer to consider how essential the museums’ artifacts were in their own time and what will be important to preserve in museums from our own reality, so heavily based on deception and disposability. In an era now dominated by 'fake' news and ephemeral items, what will serve to form an image of us, and how might our current material obsessions represent our culture to the future?”

Nakhova has taught studio art practice at Wayne State University, Carnegie Mellon University, Princeton University, and the Salzburg International Summer Academy of Fine Art s, among other institutions.

== Selected exhibitions ==
Nakhova’s work has been shown in over 40 solo exhibitions, including:

- 2020 Wall, pop/off/art gallery, Moscow RU
- 2019 Irina Nakhova: Museum on the Edge, Zimmerli Art Museum, New Brunswick, NJ US
- 2017 Battle of the Invalids, pop/off/art gallery, Moscow RU
- 2016 Gaze, Pushkin State Museum of Fine Arts, Moscow RU
- 2015 Green Pavilion, Representing Russia at the 56th International Art Exhibition, Venice Biennale, IT
- 2014 Paradise, Vinzavod, Moscow RU
- 2011 Rooms, Moscow Museum of Modern Art, Moscow RU
- 2010 Irina Nakhova and Pavel Pepperstein: Moscow Partisan Conceptualism, Orel Art UK, London, UK
- 2006 Moscow Installation, Karlsruhe Kunstlerhaus, Karlsruhe D
- 2005 Probably Would, Nailya Alexander Gallery, New York, NY US
- 2004 Silence, Galerie im Traklhaus, Salzburg A
- 2003 Rehearsal, State Tretyakov Gallery, Moscow RU
- 2000 Deposition, Rupertinum, Museum Moderner Kunst, Salzburg, A
- 1995 Friends and Neighbors, Cranbrook Art Museum, Bloomfield Hills, MI US
- 1992 In Memoriam, Chicago International Art Exposition, Special Project Installation, Chicago, US
- 1992 Recent Works, Phyllis Kind Gallery, New York US
- 1991 Partial Triumph II, Galeria Berini, Barcelona ES
- 1990 Momentum Mortis, Phyllis Kind Gallery, New York US
- 1989 Partial Triumph I, Vanessa Devereux Gallery, London GB

Her work has been exhibited in over 60 group exhibitions, including:

- 2022 De Profundis, Golubitsky Art Foundation. May–October, Golubitskoe RU
- 2019 THERE IS A BEGINNING IN THE END. The Secret Tintoretto Fraternity, Chiesa San Fantin, Venice
- 2018 Performer and Participant, Tate Modern, London GB
- 2016 “Thinking Pictures”, Zimmerli Art Museum, Rutgers University, New Brunswick, NJ US
- 2015 Contemporaries of the Future: Jewish Artists in the Russian Avant-Garde, Jewish Museum and Tolerance Center, Moscow
- 2014 Post Pop: East Meets West, Saatchi Gallery, London GB
- 2013 Feminism: From Avant-Garde to the Present Day, Manege, Worker and Kolkhoz Woman Center, Moscow RU
- 2006 Territories of Terror, Boston University Art Gallery, Boston US
- 2003 Luleå Sommar Biennial, KILen, The Artists Group in Luleå SE
- 2003 Berlin-Moskau/Moskau-Berlin 1950-2000, Martin-Gropius-Bau, Berlin D
- 2002 Aquaria, Oberösterreichisches Landesmuseum, Linz A; Kunstsammlungen Chemnitz D
- 1999 Sculpture - Figure - Woman, Kunstsammlungen Chemnitz D
- 1999 Conceptualist Art: Points of Origin 1950s to 80s, Queens Museum, Queens, NY US
- 1998 Sculpture - Figure - Woman, Oberösterreichisches Landesmuseum, Linz A, Präprintium, Staatsbibliothek Berlin D
- 1995 Cathedral of Time, a Collaborative Installation organized by Irina Nakhova, Michigan Central Depot, Detroit, MI US
- 1995 Non-Conformists in Russia, 1957-1965, traveling exhibition: Wilhelm-Hack Museum, Ludwigshafen am Rhein, Documenta Halle, Kassel, and Staatliches Lindenau Museum, Altenburg D
- 1994 Dialogue with the Other, Kunsthallen Brandts Klaedefabrik, Odense DK; Norrköping Konst Museum, Norrköping S
- 1994 Monumental Propaganda, Smithsonian International Gallery, Washington DC US
- 1993 Adresse Provisoire, Musée de la Poste, Paris F
- 1993 Baltic Sculpture 93, Gotlands Art Museum, Visby S
- 1993 After Perestroika: Kitchenmaids or Statesmen, Independent Curator Incorporated (ICI), traveling exhibition in 6 museums US and CDN*
- 1990 Iskonstvo: Stockholm-Moscow-Berlin, Kulturhuset Stockholm S
- 1989 The Green Show, Exit Art, New York US
- 1988 Ich lebe-Ich Sehe, Kunstmuseum Bern CH
- 1988 Iskunstvo: Moscow-Berlin, Bahnhof Westend, Berlin-West D

== Collections ==
Nakhova's work is in public and private collections throughout France, Germany, Great Britain, Italy, Spain, Sweden, Switzerland, and the United States. In Russia, her work can be found at the Moscow Museum of Modern Art, the National Centre for Contemporary Arts, and The State Tretyakov Gallery, Moscow.

Nakhova's work is part of the Norton and Nancy Dodge Collection of Soviet Nonconformist Art in the Zimmerli Museum at Rutgers University, New Brunswick, New Jersey, and in the collection of Tate Modern.

== Publications ==
- Sharp, Jane A. and Tulovsky, Julia, ed. Irina Nakhova. Museum on the Edge, New Brunswick NJ. Zimmerli Art Museum and Rutgers University Press, 2019. Published on the occasion of the exhibition of the same name at Zimmerli Art Museum, New Brunswick, NJ. ISBN 978-1-9788-1474-5
- Irina Nakhova: The Green Pavilion. Stella Art Foundation, 2015. Published on the occasion of the Venice Biennale 56th International Art Exhibition. ISBN 978-5904652111
- Irina Nakhova: Rooms. Moscow: Moscow Museum of Modern Art, 2011. Published on the occasion of Nakhova's Rooms retrospective exhibition at the Moscow Museum of Modern Art. ISBN 978-5916110265
- Irina Nakhova: Works 1973-2004. Salzburg, Moscow: International Summer Academy of Fine Arts, Salzburg; National Centre for Contemporary Arts, Moscow, 2004. Published on the occasion of the exhibition of the same name at Galerie im Traklhaus, Salzburg. ISBN 3-901369-23-6
