= Soviet nonconformist art =

Soviet art outside of the rubric of Socialist Realism

Soviet nonconformist art was Soviet art produced in the Soviet Union outside the control of the Soviet state. The art movement started in the Stalinist era and was, in particular, outside of the rubric of Socialist Realism. Other terms used to refer to this phenomenon are Soviet counterculture, "underground art" or "unofficial art".

== History ==
=== 1917–1932 ===
From the time of the Bolshevik Revolution in 1917 until 1932, the historical Russian avant-garde flourished and strove to appeal to the proletariat. However, in 1932 Joseph Stalin's government took control of the arts with the 1932 decree of the Bolshevik Central Committee "On the Restructuring of Literary-Artistic Organizations", which put all artists' unions under the control of the Communist Party. Two years later, Stalin instituted a policy that unified aesthetic and ideological objectives, which was called socialist realism, broadly defined as art that was, "socialist in content and realist in form." Moreover, the new policy defined four categories of unacceptable art: political art, religious art, erotic art, and "formalistic" art, which included abstraction, expressionism, and conceptual art. Beginning in 1936, avant-garde artists who were unable or unwilling to adapt to the new policy were forced out of their positions, and often sent to the gulag, as part of Stalin's Great Purges.

=== End of World War II – 1953 ===
In the wake of World War II, referred to in Russia as The Great Patriotic War, Party resolutions were passed in 1946 and 1948, by Andrei Zhdanov, chief of the Propaganda Administration formally denouncing Western cultural influences at the start of the Cold War. Art students such as Ülo Sooster, an Estonian who later became important to the Moscow nonconformist movement, were sent to Siberian prison camps. The nonconformist artist Boris Sveshnikov also spent time in a Soviet labor camp. Oleg Tselkov was expelled from art school for 'formalism' in 1955, which from the viewpoint of the Party might have constituted an act of treason.

=== 1953 (the death of Stalin) – 1962 ===
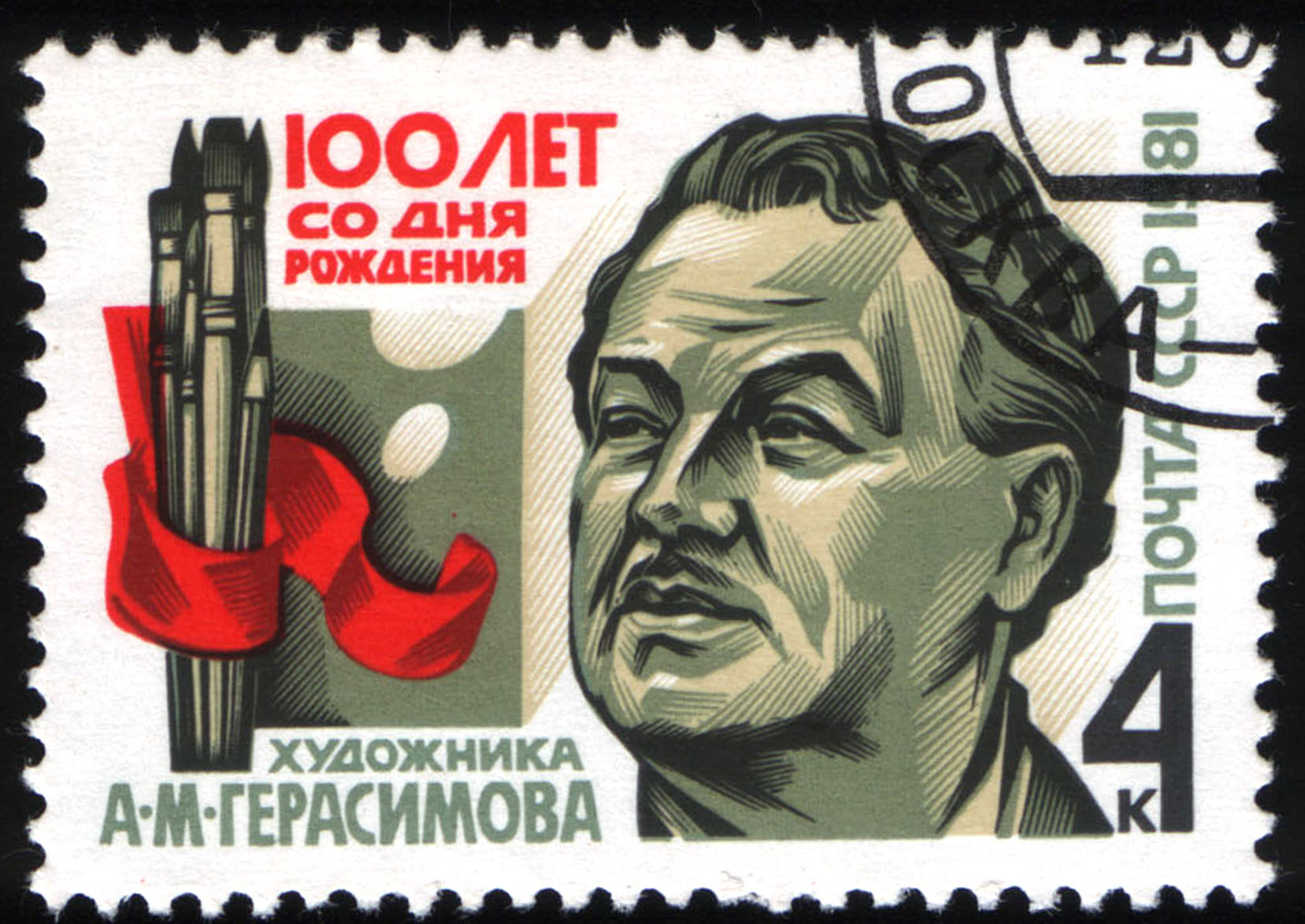
USSR stamp by Aleksandr Gerasimov

The death of Joseph Stalin in 1953, and Nikita Khrushchev's subsequent denunciation of his rule during his Secret Speech at the Twentieth Party Congress in 1956 created the "Khruschev Thaw"; a liberal atmosphere wherein artists had more freedom to create nonsanctioned work without fearing repercussions. Furthermore, Stalin's cult of personality was recognized as detrimental, and within weeks many paintings and busts bearing his likeness were removed from public places. Artists such as Aleksandr Gerasimov, who had made their careers painting idealized portraits of Stalin, were forced out of their official positions, as they had become embarrassing to the new leadership.

=== 1962 – mid-1970s ===
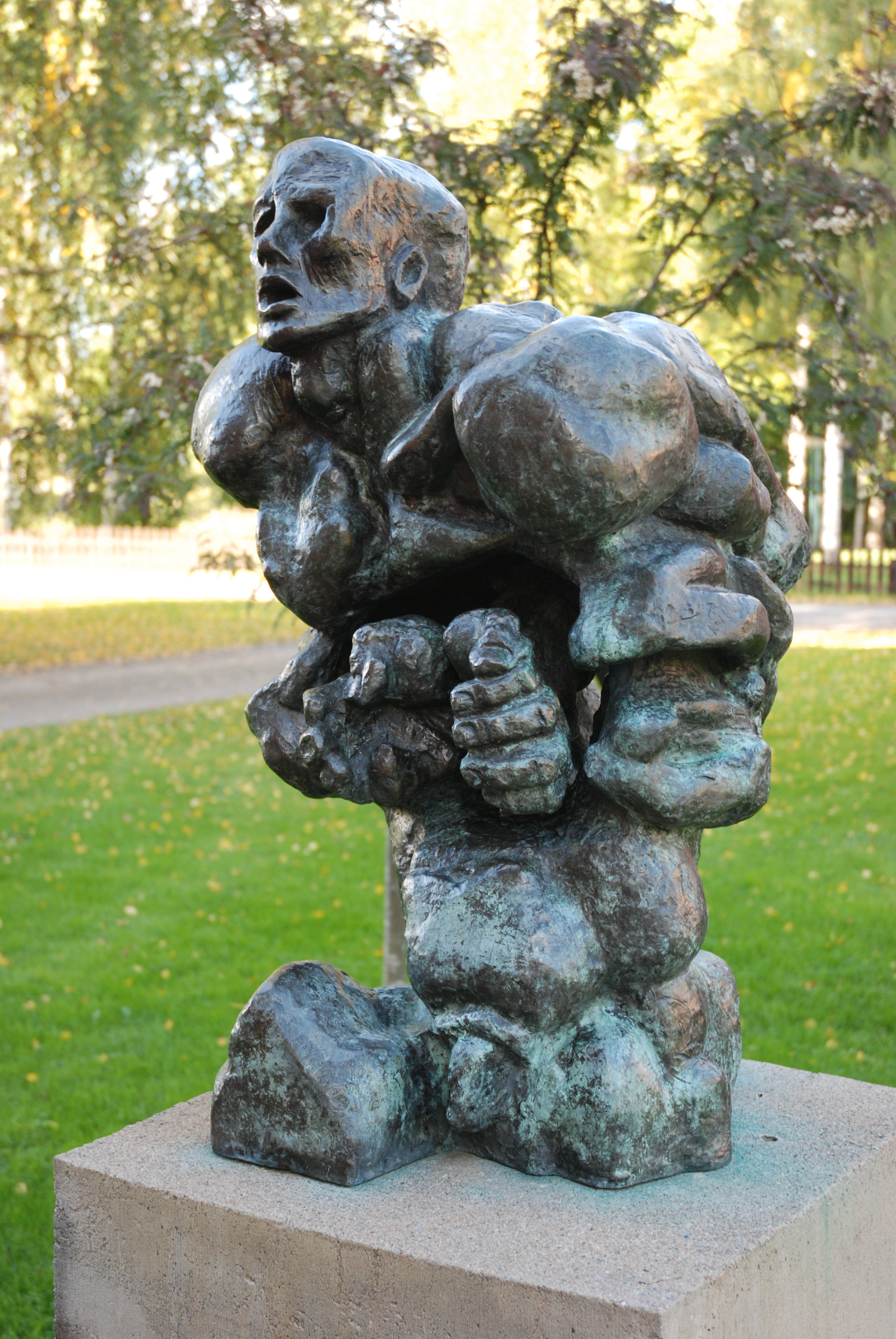
Ernst Neizvestny. The Prophet. Sculpture Park, Uttersberg, Sweden

The "thaw" era ended quickly, when in 1962, Khrushchev attended the public Manezh exhibition (an episode known as the Manege Affair) at which several nonconformist artists were exhibiting, including Ülo Sooster with his Eye in the Egg. Khrushchev got into a public and now-famous argument with Ernst Neizvestny, sculptor (1925-2016), regarding the function of art in society. However, this altercation had the unintended effect of fomenting unofficial art as a movement. Artists could no longer hold delusions that the state would recognize their art, yet the climate had become friendly and open enough that a coherent organization had formed. Additionally, punishments for unofficial artists became less severe; they were denied admittance to the union instead of being executed.

As a "movement" nonconformist art was stylistically diverse. However, in the post-thaw era its function and role in society became clear. As the Russian curator, author and museum director Joseph Bakstein wrote,

The duality of life in which the official perception of everyday reality is independent of the reality of the imagination leads to a situation where art plays a special role in society. In any culture, art is a special reality, but in the Soviet Union, art was doubly real precisely because it had no relation to reality. It was a higher reality.... The goal of nonconformism in art was to challenge the status of official artistic reality, to question it, to treat it with irony. Yet that was the one unacceptable thing. All of Soviet society rested on orthodoxy, and nonconformism was its enemy. That is why even the conditional and partial legalization of nonconformism in the mid-1970s was the beginning of the end of the Soviet regime.

=== The 1980s ===
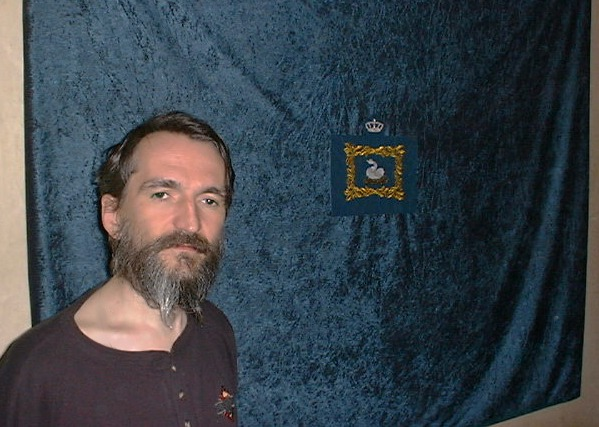
Timur Novikov

Timur Novikov was one of the leaders of St. Petersburg art in the 1980s. In 1982 his theory of "Zero Object" acted as one of the foundations of Russian conceptual art. In 1988 he founded Neo-Academism.

== Moscow artists' groups ==
There were many artistic groups and movements that were active in the Soviet Union after the period of the thaw. They can be difficult to classify because often they were not related due to stylistic objectives, but geographical proximity. Furthermore, participation in these groups was fluid as the community of nonconformist artists in Moscow was relatively small and close-knit.

=== Lianozovo Group ===
The Lianozovo Group formed in 1958 was named after the small village Lianozovo outside Moscow, where most of the artists lived and worked. The members of this group were: Evgenii Kropivnitsky, the artist and poet, Olga Potapova, Oscar Rabin, Lidia Masterkova, Vladimir Nemukhin, Nikolai Vechtomov and the poets Vsevolod Nekrasov, Genrikh Sapgir, and Igor Kholin. This group was not related due to aesthetic concerns, but due to "their shared search for a new sociocultural identity." critic and theorist Victor Tupitsyn considered that, "the aestheticization of misery is precisely what distinguishes the representatives of the de-classed communal intelligentsia of the thaw era from their predecessors (the Socialist Realists), who created a paradisiac image of history."

Many members of the Lianozovo group worked in an abstract style. The 1957 thaw resulted in the discovery of Western artistic practices and historical Russian avant-garde traditions by young Soviet artists. Artists began experimenting with abstraction, as it was the antithesis of Socialist Realism. However, the fallout from the Manezh exhibition, in 1962, caused restrictions to be enforced once again. The new restrictions could not however, curtail what the young artists had learned during the five-year interlude. Additionally, Victor Tupitsyn points out that the 1960s mark an era of "decommunalization" in the Soviet Union. Khrushchev worked to improve housing conditions, and a consequence of this was that artists began to get studios of their own, or shared spaces with like-minded colleagues.

Officially, those in the Lianozovo group were members of the Moscow Union of Graphic Artists, working in the applied and graphic arts. As such, they were not permitted to hold painting exhibitions, as that fell under the domain of the Artists' Union. Consequently, apartment exhibitions and literary salons began at this time as a means of publicly exhibiting. However, the Lianozovo group in particular was often harassed by Soviet officials as they were vigilant in pursuing public exhibitions of their work. In an attempt to circumvent the law, the Lianozovo group proposed an open-air exhibition in 1974, inviting dozens of other nonconformist artists also to exhibit. The result was the demolition of the exhibition by bulldozers and water cannons, for which reason the exhibition is still known as the Bulldozer Exhibition.

=== Sretensky Boulevard Group ===
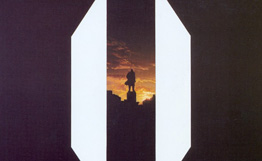
Oleg Vasiliev, Before the Sunrise, 1964

A group of artists that had studios on and around Sretensky Boulevard, Moscow, became a loosely associated like-minded community in the late 1960s. The members of this group were: Ilya Kabakov, Ülo Sooster, Eduard Steinberg, Erik Bulatov, Sergey Shablavin, Oleg Vassiliev, Viktor Pivovarov, Vladimir Yankilevsky, and sculptor Ernst Neizvestny. The artists' studios were also used as venues to show and exchange ideas about unofficial art. Like their colleagues in the Lianozovo group, the majority of visual artists who were part of the Sretensky Boulevard Group were admitted to the Moscow Union of Graphic Artists. This allowed the artists to work officially as book illustrators and graphic designers, which provided them with studio space, materials, and time to work on their own projects. Although they shared the same type of official career, the Sretensky group is not stylistically homogeneous. The name merely denotes the community that they formed as a result of working in close proximity to each other.

=== Moscow conceptualists ===
Many of the artists on Sretensky Boulevard were part of the Moscow Conceptualist school. This movement arose in the 1970s to describe the identity of the contemporary Russian artist in opposition to the government. As Joseph Bakstein explained, "The creation of this nonconformist tradition was impelled by the fact that an outsider in the Soviet empire stood alone against a tremendous state machine, a great Leviathan that threatened to engulf him. To preserve one's identity in this situation, one had to create a separate value system, including a system of aesthetic values."

Erik Bulatov explains that conceptualist art is, "a rebellion of man against the everyday reality of life... a picture interests me as some kind of system... opening into the space of my everyday existence."

This group includes Ilya Kabakov, Gregory Perkel, Erik Bulatov, Oleg Vassiliev, Sergey Shablavin, Komar and Melamid, Ivan Chuikov, Viktor Pivovarov, poets Vsevolod Nekrasov (ru), Dmitry Prigov, Lev Rubinstein, young artist and novelist Vladimir Sorokin, and also broadly encompasses the Sots artists and the Collective Actions group, which were both influential in the construction of Russian conceptualist art.

== Petersburg groups ==
=== 1960s - 1970s ===
==== Mikhail Shemiakin's Group ====
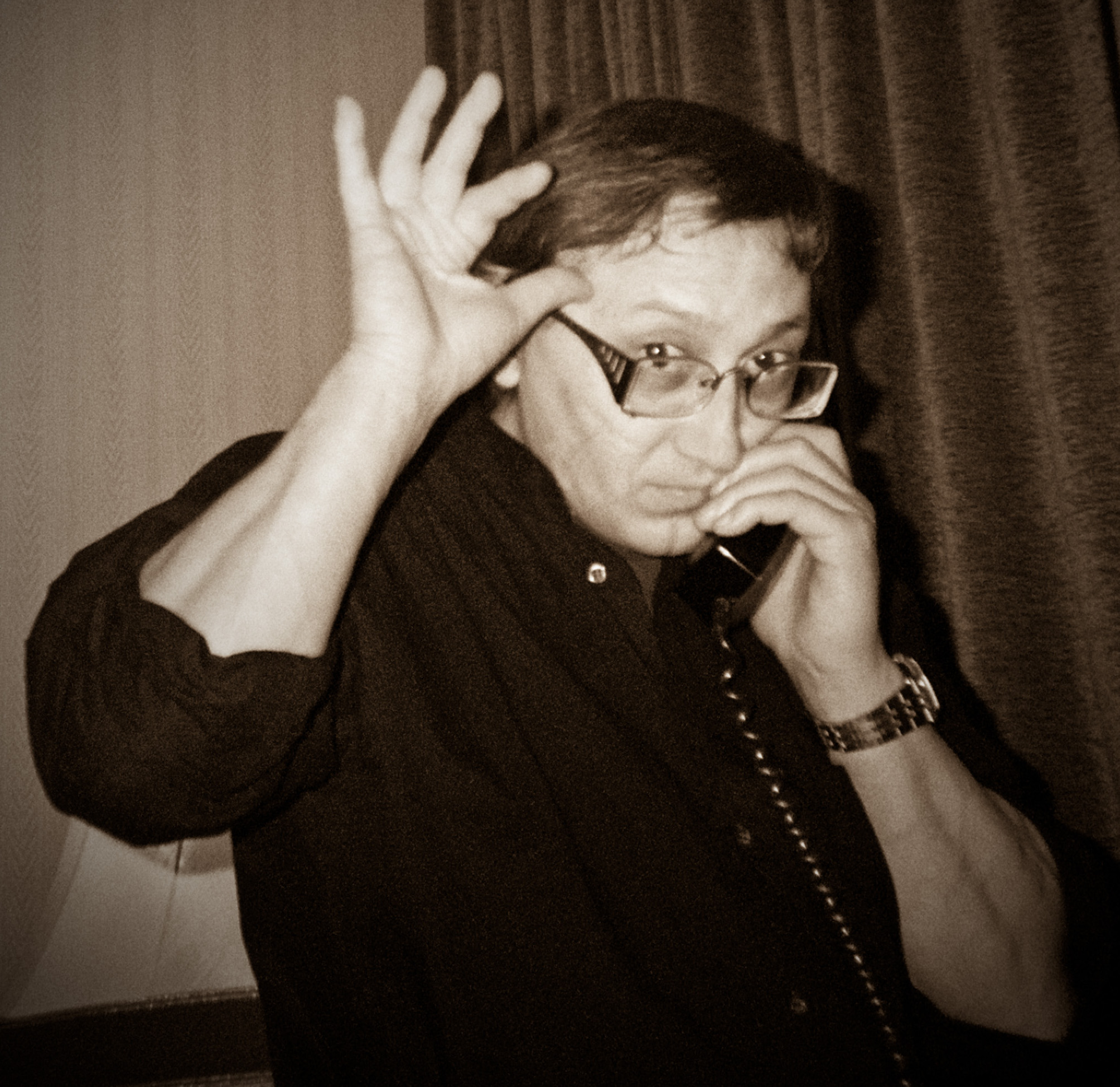
Mikhail Chemiakin

Mikhail Chemiakin's St. Petersburg Non-conformist Group developed out of a 1964 exhibition at the Hermitage Museum, where Chemiakin worked as a gallery assistant. The official name of the exhibition was Exhibition of the artist-workers of the economic part of the Hermitage: Towards the 200th anniversary of Hermitage and it included the work of Chemiakin, V. Kravchenko, V. Uflyand, V. Ovchinnikov and Oleg Liagatchev. Opening on March 30–31, it was closed by the authorities on April 1. The Hermitage director, Mikhail Artamonov, was removed from his post.

In 1967 the Petersburg Group Manifesto was written and signed by Chemiakin, O. Liagatchev, E. Yesaulenko and V. Ivanov. V. Ivanov and M. Chemiakin had previously developed the idea of Metaphysical Synthesism, which proposed creating a new form of icon painting through the study of religious art across the ages.

A. Vasiliev and the miniature painter V. Makarenko joined the group later.

Four years after the founding of the group, in 1971, Chemiakin emigrated to France, and later in 1981 to the United States. In 2007 he returned to France, where he resides now.

Liagatchev, until his emigration to Paris in 1975, and Vasiliev continued to participate in exhibitions of non-conformist artists in Leningrad at the Gaza Palace of Culture (1974) and the Nevsky Palace of Culture (1975). Liagatchev's work in this period includes: Kafka, Intimeniy XX (1973) and Composition - Canon (1975). The group finally became defunct in 1979, ceasing to have joint exhibitions.

==== Gazanevsky Culture ====
The Gazanevsky Culture also known as Gazanevsky Exhibitions, or Gazanevschchina (ru:Газаневщина), was an unofficial artistic movement of the mid-1970s.

- Before the nonconformist Gazanevsky exhibitions in Leningrad (now St. Petersburg), there were also three unofficial exhibitions at the Kozitsky Palace of Culture in 1968-1969. Among other artists, the group of artists who participated were: Yury Nashivochnikov, Anatoly Basin (ru), Igor V. Ivanov, Evgeny Goryunov, and others, who were from the "School of Sidlin", the art studio at the Kapranov Palace of Culture.
- In December 1974, the first exhibition of nonconformist artists took place at the Ivan Gaza Culture Palace, in Leningrad (St. Petersburg), Russia.
- In 1975, another Unofficial Art exhibition took place at the Nevsky Palace of Culture, Leningrad (St. Petersburg), Russia.

==== Apartment exhibitions ====
In the 1970s, a new direction took place in an unofficial art movement in Leningrad (St. Petersburg). Many artists participated in nonconformist unofficial exhibitions which were held in the private apartments, so-called Apartment Exhibitions.

Some examples of the unofficial Apartment Exhibitions include:

In November 1975, the first Jewish exhibition "Aleph", also known as "Twelve from the Soviet Underground", took place in Eugene Abeshaus's apartment, where 12 Jewish artists participated: Eugene Abeshaus, Anatoly Basin (ru), Leonid Bolmat, Aleksandr Gurevich, Yuri Kalendarev, Tatyana Kornfeld, Aleksander Manusov, Aleksander Okun, Sima Ostrovsky, Alek Rapoport, Osip Sidlin, and Olga Schmuilovich. In 1976, the catalog of this exhibition was published in California, USA.

In 1976, the second "Aleph" exhibition took place in E. Abezgauz's apartment, with Eugene Abeshaus, A. Arefiev (ru), A. Basin (ru), Richard Vasmi (ru), Aleksandr Gurevich, Yuri Kalendarev and Tatiana Kerner.

=== School of Sidlin ===
Osip Sidlin studied under Alexander Osmerkin, then Alexander Savinov, Kuzma Petrov-Vodkin, and was in contact with Kazimir Malevich.

Starting in the middle of the 1930s, Osip Sidlin taught art in Leningrad at the Ilyich (Lenin) Palace of Culture, the First Five-Year Palace of Culture, and also at the Kapranov House of Culture. until his sudden death of heart attack in 1972.

Among Sidlin's students were Anatoly Basin, Galina Basina, Vladimir Egorov, Nina Fedotova, Anatoly Golovastov, Evgeny Goryunov, Igor V. Ivanov, Galina (Sizova) Ivanova, Boris Kupin, Alexander Mikhailovsky, Yury Nashivochnikov, Sergey Sivertsev, Natalia Toreeva, Margarita Trushina, Vasily Zhavoronkov, Vasily Yuzko and the poet Yuli Goldstein.

- In 1994, the exhibition the "Memory of teacher" took place in the State Museum of Urban Sculpture, St. Petersburg, Russia. It was dedicated to the 85th birthday Anniversary of Osip Sidlin, the teacher of the "School of Sidlin".
- In February 2019, the exhibition "School of Sidlin" took place in St. Petersburg, Russia. It was dedicated to the 110 years of birthday Anniversary of Osip Sidlin.
- In 2019, the exhibition "Classics of Leningrad Art. School of Sidlin" took place in St. Petersburg, Russia.

Temple Wall School is a continuation of the "School of Sidlin" movement. After the death of Osip Sidlin, the teacher of the "School of Sidlin" art group, his student, Yury Nashivochnikov, brought the young artists together and in 1992 organized the art school, called the "Temple Wall School". Among his students were Vladimir Garde, Dmitry Markul, Svetlana Moskovskaya, Vladimir Ustinsky, Alexander Viziryako, and other artists. The "Temple Wall School" continues the tradition of the "School of Sidlin", mostly on study of the Byzantine and old Russian art, based on the two-dimensional wall fresco paintings and Russian icons. In 2015, the thesis the "School of Sidlin and Temple Wall School" was written by Svetlana Moskovskaya, Y. Nashivochnikov's student of the "Temple Wall School", and published in March, 2016 under the St. Petersburg State University, where she is discussing the continuation of the tradition of the artistic movement of 20th century to the 21st century, the next generation of the visual art movement.

- In 1996 and 2002, the exhibitions of "Temple Wall" took place in the State Museum of Urban Sculpture, St. Petersburg, Russia.
- In 2017, the exhibition "School of Sidlin and Temple Wall school" took place in St. Petersburg, Russia.

=== School of Vladimir Sterligov ===
Vladimir Sterligov was a student of Kazimir Malevich, and all his life followed K. Malevich's principles of cubism and suprematism in this artistic tradition. His followers were: Alexander Baturin, Elena Gritsenko, Alexander Nosov, Mikhail Tserush, Gennady Zubkov, and other artists, who expending the Sterligov's philosophy in their artistic view. Tatiana Glebova, the wife of Sterligov, studied under Alexander Savinov and Pavel Filonov.

=== Pavel Kondratiev's Group ===
Pavel Kondratiev was also the student of Kazimir Malevich, Pavel Filonov, Alexander Savinov at the Academy of Arts/Vkhutein, and collaborated with V. Sterligov and T. Glebova at that time and later. So, they both have the same kind of Niche in art, where their followers and pupils were in one group or another, but followed the same kind of principles in art. Pavel Kondratiev was also a follower of Pavel Filonov's "Masters of Analytical Art" (MAI) movement in Leningrad from 1927 to 1932.

=== Arefiev's Circle ===
Alexander Arefiev (ru) was a leader of the nonconformist group in Leningrad (St. Petersburg). He was expelled from the Soviet Union in 1977, and died in Paris in 1978.

The group included the artists: A. Arefiev (Arekh), Valentin Gromov (ru) (b. 1930), Richard (Rikhard) Vasmi (ru), who is also known by his quote "The artist painted his own Sarcophagus all his life", Vladimir Shagin (ru), Sholom Schwartz (ru), Natalia Zhilina, who was close to this group, and the poet Roald Mandelstam (ru), who provided to the group the inspiration for their art work. Their group was called as "The Order of Mendicant Painters" or "The Order of Unsold Painters", and they were recognized only after the starting of the new Nonconformists movement in Leningrad and their participation in the exhibitions at the Gaza Palace of Culture (1974) and the Nevsky Palace of Culture (1975).

=== Other nonconformist artists (mid-1970s) ===
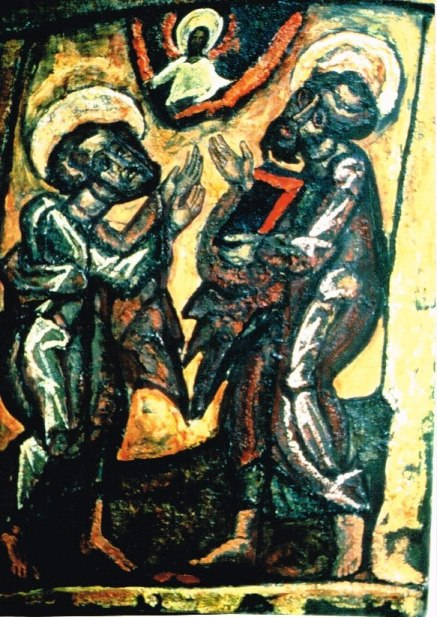
Alek Rapoport, "Apostles Peter and Paul", mixed media. 1995

These artists participated individually in Soviet non-conformist art. They took an active part in the unofficial art, including participation in the apartment exhibitions and in the unofficial art exhibitions, such as the non-conformist Gaza-Nevsky exhibitions in Leningrad (St. Petersburg) in the mid-1970s.

- In 1990, the album "The Artists of the Gaza-Nevsky culture", compiled by E. Andreeva and published as a part of the "Contemporary Leningrad Avant-garde" series in St. Petersburg, Russia. Besides the artists included there from the "School of Sidlin", the "Sterligov Group", and "Arefiev Circle", the following artists were included in this album among other founders of the Gaza-Nevsky culture:Eugene Abeshaus, Valentin Afanasiev (ru), painter and musician, Anatoly Belkin, Mikhail Chemiakin, Yuri Dyshlenko (ru), Vadim Filimonov (ru), Yury Galetsky, Vladlen Gavrilchik (ru), Tatiana Kerner, Vitaly Kubasov, Mikhail Koulakov, Nikolay Lubushkin, Alexander Manusov, Yury Medvedev, Vladimir Michailov, Alexander Morev (ru), Evgeny Mikhnov-Voitenko (ru), Vladimir Nekrasov, Alexander Okun, Vladimir Ovchinnikov, Igor Novikov (painter), Yury Petrochenkov, Alek Rapoport, Yuly Rybakov, Evgeny Rukhin, Igor Sacharow-Ross, Igor Sinyavin, Igor Tulpanov and Gennady Ustugov.
- Abstract expressionism and Tachisme: Anatoly Zverev and Leningrad artist Eugeny Mikhnov-Voitenko (ru)
- Vasily Golubev (painter)
- Boris Chetkov

=== Publications and late exhibitions ===
- In 2001, "Школа Сидлина" ("School of Sidlin") book, published by Isaak Kushnir, as a part of the series of the books "Avant-garde on the Neva" about the Soviet Avant-garde Art, where the students of the School of Sidlin included, St. Petersburg, Russia. ISBN 5-901751-01-9, OCLC 845543694
- In 2005, "Герои Ленинградской культуры 1950-1980-е" ("Heroes of Leningrad culture 1950s-1980s") book, compiled by Larisa Skobkina (ru) (b. 1951), the curator of the Central Exhibition Hall "Manege", to reflect the unofficial art groups formed around the artists and teachers, such as V. Sterligov, P. Kondratiev, O. Sidlin, G. Dlugach, N. Akimov, S. Levin, and others. It includes also the artists who did not belong to any art groups, but still played the notable role in the nonconformist movement at that time, St. Petersburg, Russia (in Russian). OCLC 637824734
- In 2013, the Museum of the History of St. Petersburg organized the exhibition that reflects the famous art groups and schools at 1970s, including O. Sidlin, V. Sterligov, P. Kondratiev, A. Arefiev, and others.
- In 2013, "Petersburg 20 Years" exhibition (1993-2013), organized by "Manege", St. Petersburg, Russia, where the sculptures of the artists, the paintings of the "Arefiev Circle", the artwork of the "School of Sidlin" art group, and others were exhibited.
- In 2015, "Наши ниши. Газаневщина 3" ("Nashi nishi. Gazanevshchina 3") book, by Anatoly Basin (ru) (b. 1936), published by DEAN as the Series "Avangard na Neve" in St. Petersburg, Russia. ISBN 978-5-93630-911-3
- In 2016-2017, the artwork of the artists, including the artists from the "School of Sidlin" (Y. Nashivochnikov, A. Basin, I. Ivanov, Natalia Toreeva), "School of Sterligov", "Arefiev Circle" (A. Arefiev, R. Vasmi, V. Gromov, V. Shagin, and Sh. Schwartz), and others, now in the "Tsarskoselskaya Collection" (ru) State Museum, St. Petersburg, Russia.
- In 2018, the St. Petersburg State University organized the exhibition of the works of Leningrad nonconformist artists from 1970-1990, based on their collection and the collection of the Diaghilev Museum of Modern Art.
- 2 December 2017 - 28 January 2018. italy. Event exhibition."Goodbye Perestrojka - One hundred works by artists from the former Soviet Union". Bilingual book texts: Italian / English. Arianna Di Genova - art critic, journalist. Rome. Italy. Victoria Donovan - cultural historian of Russia, University of St. Andrews, Scotland. UK. Yulia Lebedeva - art historian, curator of the Museum "Other Art" at the Russian State University for the Humanities (RSHU), Moscow. Irena Buzinska - art historian, curator at the Latvian National Museum of Art, Riga. Vladislav Shabalin - a dissident artist in the Soviet Union, he was detained in a psychiatric hospital and rehabilitated with the arrival of Perestrojka.
- In November 2013, “Re-Imagining Russia - Boris Chetkov – Landscape & Genre Painting”, Posthumous retrospective exhibition – in Mayfair, London - organized by Theodora Clarke (Courtauld Institute of Art) and the Pushkin Group, Ltd. ISBN 978-0-9766949-5-3

== Absheron Artists (Azerbaijani artists) of the 1960s - 1980s ==
Javad Mirjavadov, Azerbaijani artist, a non-conformist and a reformer, whose work had an influence on the development of contemporary Azerbaijani art. A turning point in his creative work came when he was a student and saw a reproduction of Paul Cézanne's Mardi Gras, experiencing creative regeneration.

== Ukrainian underground ==
Ukrainian underground developed in the part of soviet period of Ukraine, from the late 1950s until the 1980-90s. This term was used for the culture which was banned by the state in totalitarian countries of Eastern Europe and USSR. It was known under other names, such as Unofficial art, nonconformism, Dissident art in literature, music and visual art. Was aroused spontaneously in all Ukrainian large cities as Kyiv, Odesa, Kharkiv, Uzhhorod, Lviv. It ended thanks to perestroika, that led to Ukrainian independence in 1991.

The Ukrainian part of Soviet nonconformism involved such artists as Vagrich Bakhchanyan, Vilen Barskyi, Olena Golub, Valentin Khrushch, Yuri Kosin, Alexander Kostetsky, Vladimir Strelnikov, Stanislav Sychov, Feodosiy Tetianych, Irina Vysheslavska, Vasyl Yermylov, Nicholas Zalevsky, and many others.

== Collections ==
Collectors of Soviet and Russian Nonconformist art include:

- Tatiana Kolodzei and her daughter, Natalia Kolodzei. In 1991 they founded the Kolodzei Art Foundation which has presented many exhibitions on Russian Nonconformist art.
- The Norton and Nancy Dodge Collection, Jane Voorhees Zimmerli Art Museum, Rutgers University, New Brunswick, New Jersey, USA
- Lili Brochetain Collection, Paris France
- Robert Mohren Collection, Germany
- The Claude and Nina Gruen Collection, Jane Voorhees Zimmerli Art Museum, Rutgers University, New Brunswick, New Jersey, USA
- Igor Savitsky, Nukus Museum of Art, Nukus, Karakalpakstan.
- Vera Podolsky founded Podolsky Art Gallery in 1974, one of the largest private collections of Ukrainian Nonconformist Art - Odessa Group [www.podolskyart.com]
- Regina Khidekel Collection, New York
- Leonid Talochkin Collection, In 2000 they founded the "Museum of the Other Art" at the State University of Humanities in Moscow.
- Kenneth Pushkin founded Pushkin Gallery in 1995 featuring St. Petersburg Nonconformists, Boris Chetkov and Vasily Golubev (painter) [www.pushkingallery.com], USA

== In literature ==
In nonconformist literary world, except mentioned above poets Evgenii Kropivnitsky (ru), Igor Kholin, Genrikh Sapgir, Vilen Barskyi, Roald Mandelstam (ru), Vsevolod Nekrasov (ru), Igor Sinyavin, Dmitry Prigov, Lev Rubinstein and novelist Vladimir Sorokin, there were underground writers and poets Vasily Grossman, Varlam Shalamov, Yury Dombrovsky, David Dar (ru), Lev Kopelev, Aleksandr Galich, Viktor Nekrasov, Aleksandr Solzhenitsyn, Pavel Ulitin, Arkadiy Belinkov, Elizaveta Mnatsakanova (ru), Alexander Zinoviev, Naum Korzhavin, Yuli Daniel, Andrei Sinyavsky, Arkady Lvov (ru), Yury Aikhenvald (ru), Yuz Aleshkovsky, Fazil Iskander, Vladimir Maksimov, Yuri Mamleev, Georgi Vladimov, Vasily Aksyonov, Vladimir Voinovich, Galina Andreeva (ru), Leonid Chertkov (ru), Gennadiy Aygi, Anatoly Gladilin, Stanislav Krasovitsky (ru), Mikhail Eremin (ru), Sergey Kulle (ru), Leonid Vinogradov (ru), Yuliy Kim, Anri Volokhonsky, Vadim Kreid (ru), Andrei Bitov, artist Vladimir Uflyand, Dmitry Avaliani, Leonid Borodin, Venedikt Yerofeyev, Joseph Brodsky, Alexei Khvostenko, Konstantin Kuzminsky, Sergei Dovlatov, Yevgeny Kharitonov, Kari Unksova (ru), Ry Nikonova, Oleg Grigoriev, Eduard Limonov, Sasha Sokolov, Viktor Krivulin, Sergey Stratanovsky (ru), Valery Kholodenko (ru), Mikhail Faynerman, Yevgeny Saburov (ru) Yevgeni Popov, Vladimir Erl (ru), Elena Ignatova (ru), Serge Segay, Mikhail Aizenberg (ru), Aleksandr Mironov (ru), Elena Shvarts, Olga Sedakova, Ivan Akhmetyev (ru), Svetlana Kekova (ru), Sergey Gandlevsky, Sergei Nadeev (ru), Nikolai Kononov (ru), and Pavel Krusanov (ru). Many of their works were published in an underground form of samizdat (self-publishing). Many of them had to emigrate to the West, while Oleg Grigoriev and Venedikt Yerofeyev "emigrated" to alcoholism, Yury Aikhenvald and Gennadiy Aygi to translations, and Yury Dombrovsky and Kari Unskova were murdered.

On December 15, 1975, the nonconformist artists and poets, staged a poetry-reading on the Senate Square to commemorate the sesquicentennial of the Decembrists' uprising. They were detained by the police.

== Gallery ==
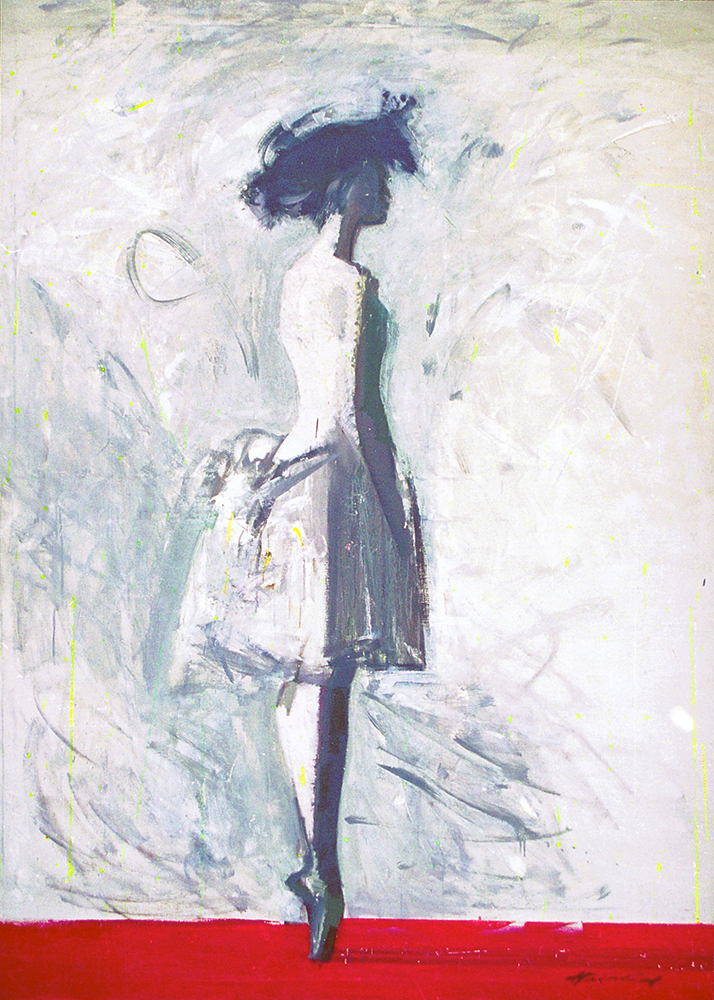
Vasiliy Ryabchenko, Ballerina, 1989

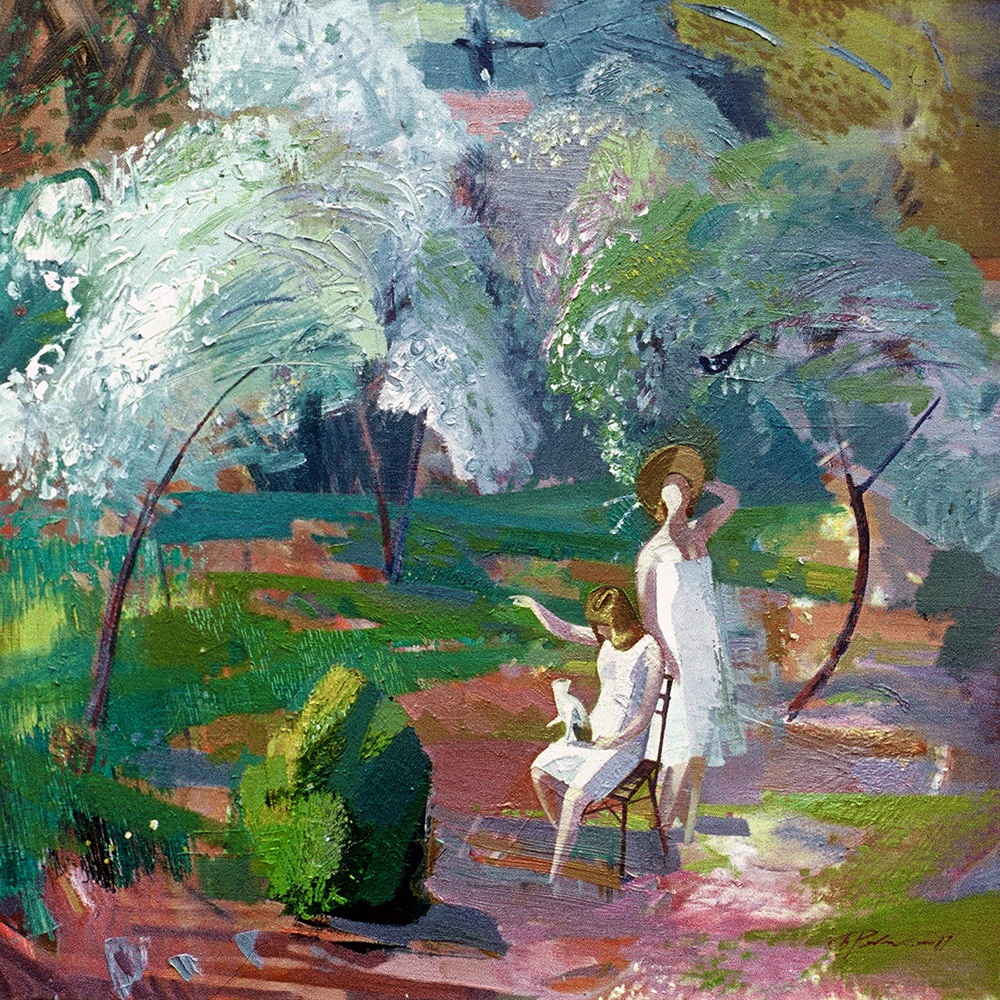
Vasiliy Ryabchenko, Flowering time, 1987

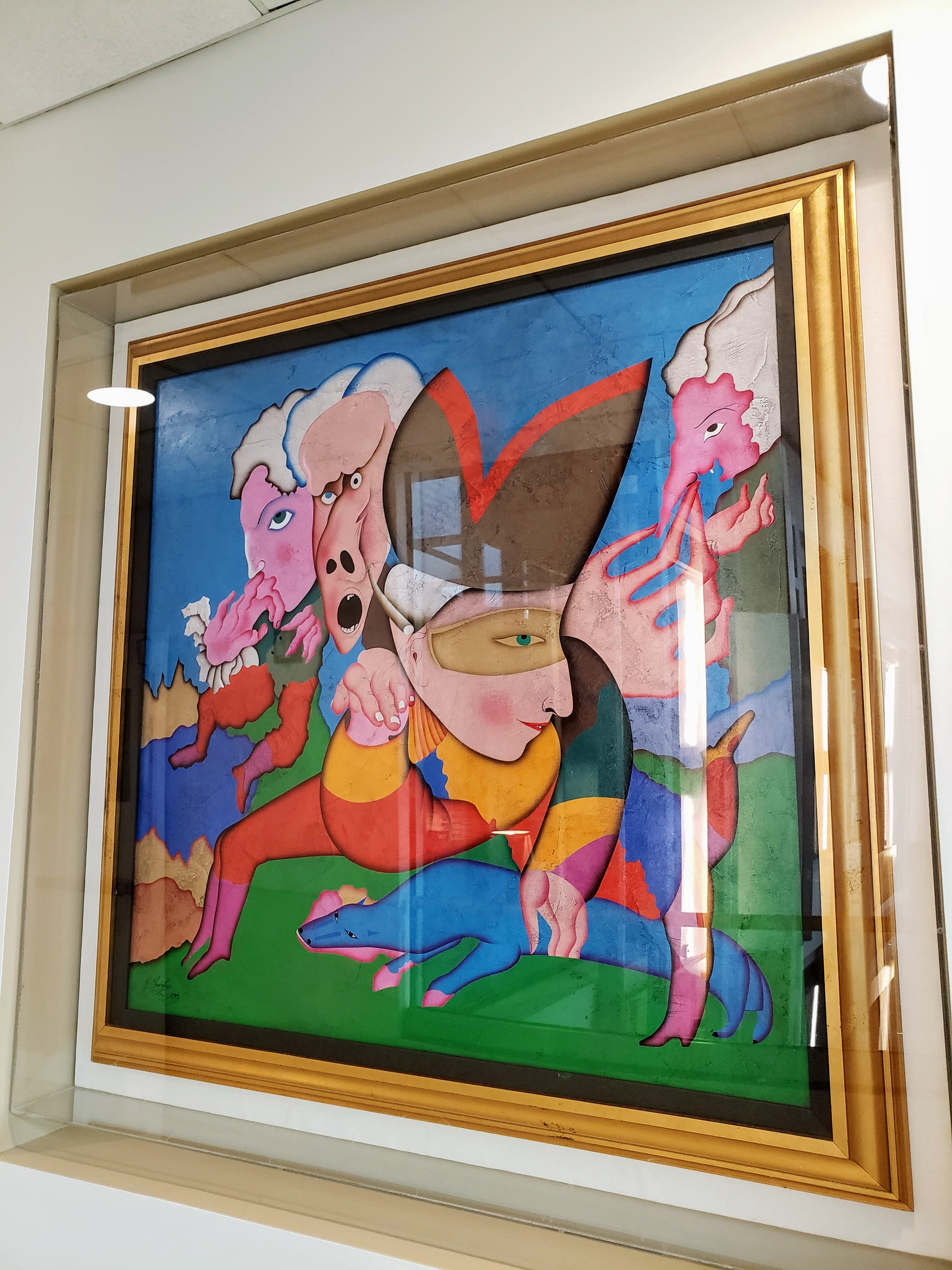
Mihail Chemiakin, Carnival at St Petersburg XXII, 2019

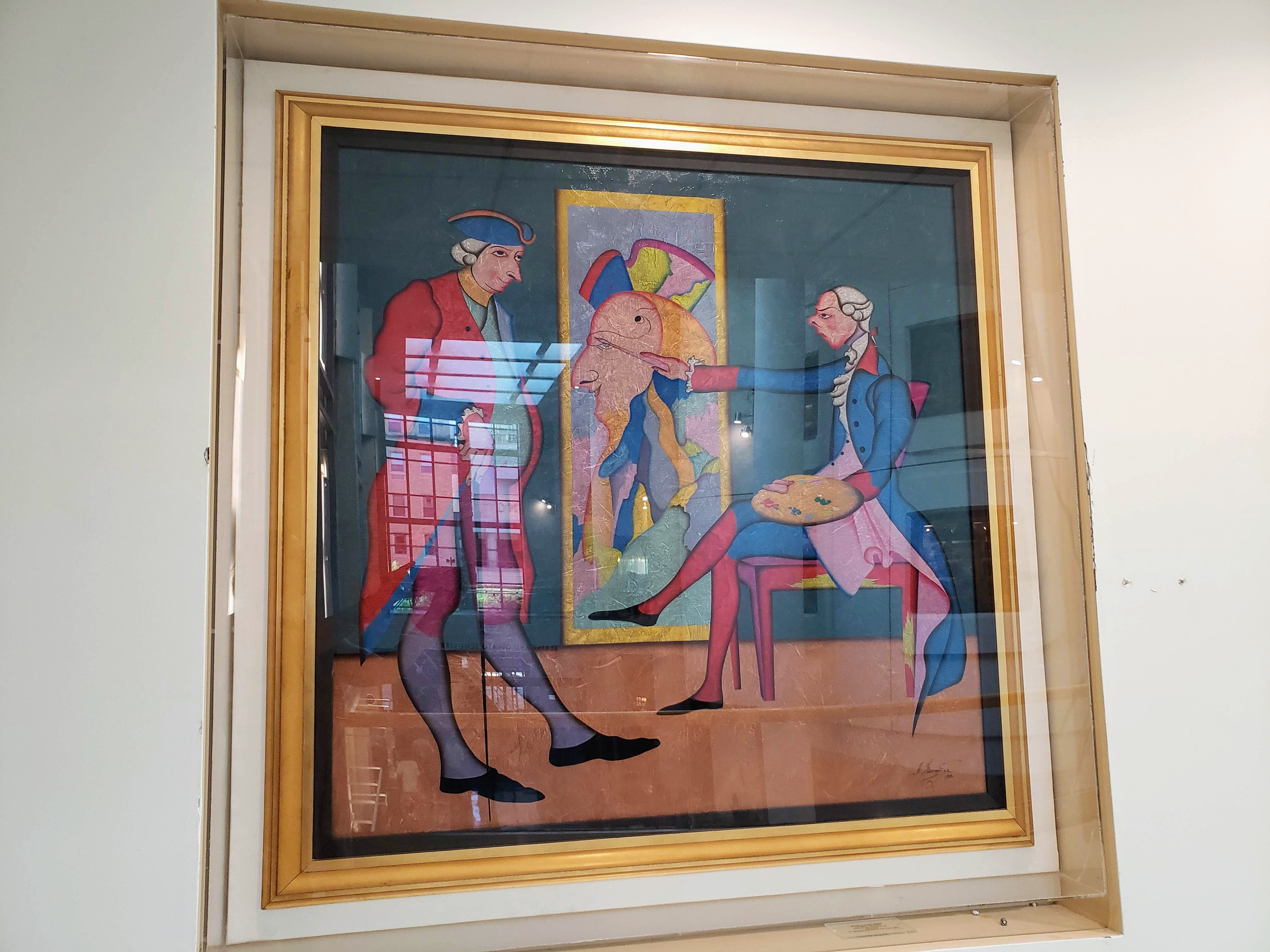
Mihail Chemiakin, Artist and his Client, 1988

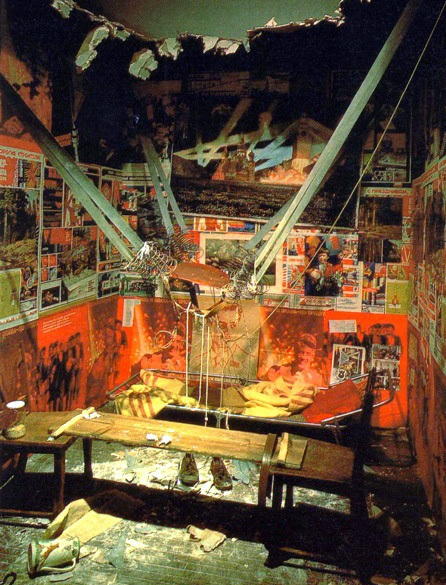
Ilya Kabakov, The Man Who Flew into Space from His Room, 1986

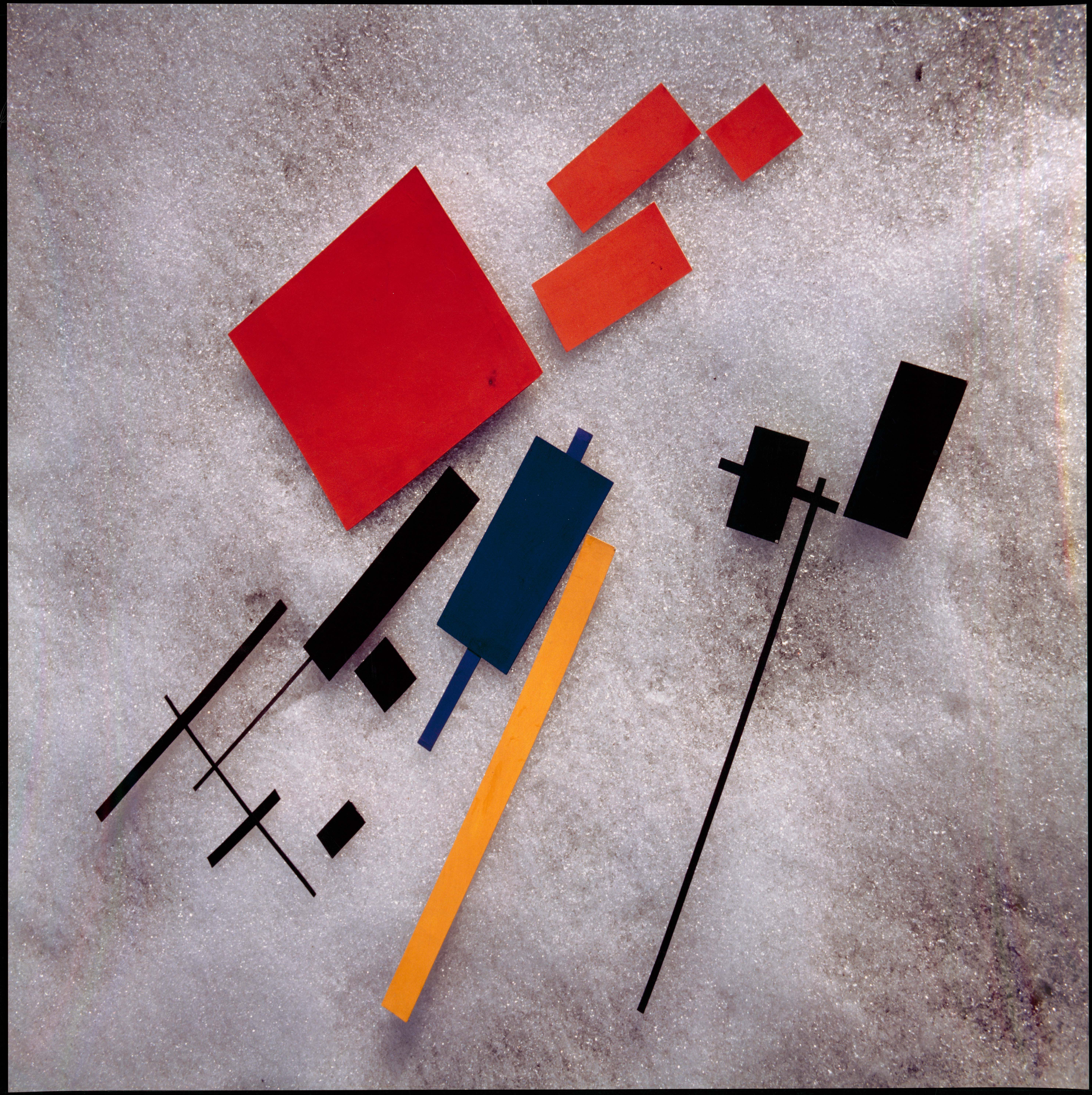
Francisco Infante-Arana, Suprematist Games, 1968

== See also ==
- Culture of the Soviet Union
- Russian postmodernism
- Second Russian avant-garde
- Kolodzei Art Foundation
- Norton and Nancy Dodge Collection of Soviet Nonconformist Art
- Galina Osetsimskaya
- Ukrainian underground
