= Alexandre Rabinovitch-Barakovsky =

Russian composer

Alexandre Rabinovitch-Barakovsky (Russian: Александр Ильич Рабино́вич-Барако́вский; born 30 March 1945) is a Russian-born composer, conductor and classical pianist who lives in Switzerland. He is one of the first composers of minimalism (from 1969); "La Belle Musique N.3" (1977) is the first work for orchestra in the minimalist field. He emigrated to Paris from Moscow in 1974, and now lives in Switzerland. He has collaborated with numerous musical artists, notably with the pianist Martha Argerich, with whom he has recorded works by Rachmaninoff and Brahms.

== Selected works ==
Alexandre Rabinovitch-Barakovsky defined his musical conceptions as <<TERZA PRATICA>>.

Rabinovitch-Barakovsky's main works are all part of a global work-in-progress called "Anthology of Archaic Rituals – In Search of the Center".

- "Les mots de Andrei Biely" (1969) cantata
- "Le point d'appui trouvé" (1970) chamber music
- "Happy end"" (1972) electro-acoustic piece
- "La Belle Musique n°2" (1974) chamber music
- "Perpetuum mobile?" (1975) amplified violin solo, amplified piano, amplified vibraphone" (+ amplified campanelli)
- "Le récit de voyage" (1976) violin, cello, marimba, piano" (dedicated to Alexei Lubimov)
- "La Belle Musique n°3" (1977) for orchestra
- "Requiem pour une marée noire" (1978) amplified soprano, amplified vibraphone, amplified piano
- "Entente cordiale" (1979) amplified piano and orchestra
- "Litanies" (1979) string quartet and vibraphone
- "Liebliches Lied" (1980) for piano 4 hands
- "Musique populaire" (1980) 2 amplified pianos, 2 amplified marimbas, amplified celesta
- "Discours sur la délivrance" (1982) amplified cello solo, amplified piano, amplified clavinova, amplified vibraphone
- "La belle musique n°4" (1987) for 4 amplified pianos
- "Cantique pour Orfeo" (1987) amplified baryton, amplified vibraphone, amplified piano, amplified celesta
- "In illo tempore" (1989) sinfonia concertante for 2 amplified pianos and chamber orchestra
- "Musique populaire" (1994) 2 amplified pianos and orchestra
- "3 Invocations" (1995) string quartet and amplified celesta
- " Incantations" (1996) sinfonia concertante for amplified piano (+ amplified celesta) and chamber orchestra
- "6 Etats intermédiaires" (1997–98) sinfonia for orchestra, based on the Bardo Thödol (Tibetan Book of the Dead)
- "La Triade" (1998) sinfonia concertante for amplified violin and orchestra
- " Retour aux sources" (1999) Sinfonia for orchestra" (dedicated to Vladimir Yankilevsky)
- "La harpe de David" (1999) sinfonia concertante for amplified cello and orchestra
- " The celtic harp" (2000) sinfonia concertante for amplified violin, amplified viola and orchestra
- "Die Zeit" (2000) for four amplified instruments: violin, cello, piano, celesta (dedicated to Maria Balkan)
- "Le Tryptique" (2000)," sinfonia for orchestra
- "Les trois Gunas" (2001) for amplified flute, amplified clarinet, amplified clavinova, amplified vibrafono+marimba+campanelli" (1 percussionist), amplified piano
- "Jiao" (2004) for 11 strings, amplified celesta, amplified vibraphone, amplified clavinova
- "Maithuna" (2005) sinfonia concertante for orchestra
- "Les Chants-Spirales" (2006) for amplified vibraphone solo, amplified clavinova, amplified piano
- "3 Manas" (2009) for amplified piano or amplified electric piano. (dedicated to HJ Lim)
- "Opus Magnum" (2010) Sinfonia concertante for chamber orchestra in three movements : Nigredo, Albedo, Rubedo
- "Alchera" (Dreaming, Dreamtime, 2012) for amplified cello and orchestra. Dedicated to Sir Roger Norrington.
- "The Source Field"for orchestra in two movements (1. Space and Time 2. Time and Space), based on the book "The Source Field" by David Wilcock
- "La Belle Musique N.5-Dhikr" (2014) for vibraphone, piano and string quartet.

== Selected discography ==
- Terza Pratica, Box Set [4 CDs], 2012 VDE GALLO, Switzerland
- Tantric Coupling, 2006 MEGADISC Classics, Belgium MDC 7802
- Pura Cosa Mentale, 2004 MEGADISC Classics, Belgium MDC 7812/11
- Die Zeit, 2001 MEGADISC Classics, Belgium MDC 7822
- La Triade, 2000 DORON Music, Switzerland DRC 3033
- Incantations, 1999 MEGADISC Classics, Belgium MDC 7831
- An Introduction to Alexandre Rabinovitch, 1996 MEGADISC Classics, Belgium MDC 7846
- Alexandre Rabinovitch Oeuvres pour Piano, 1994 VALOIS-Naive, France V 4694
- Pourquoi je suis si sentimental, Alexei Lubimov, 1995 "BIS"
