= Alexander Gurevich =

Israeli artist

- Александр Гуревич
- Born: Alexander Gurevich; February 7, 1944 (age 82); Alapaevsk, Ural
- Education: High Art College
- Occupation: Painter
- Website: gurevichart.com

Alexander Gurevich (Russian: Александр Гуревич, Hebrew: 'אלכסנדר גורביץ; born February 7, 1944) is an Israeli painter and graphic artist. He was born in Alapaevsk, Ural (former Soviet Union) where his family stayed during World War II. Gurevich's parents divorced when he was young; he and his mother returned to her hometown Leningrad when he was 18 months old. He was raised by his grandparents from mother's side. After finishing high school, he attended the then Leningrad Electrotechnical Institute (LETI) (now Saint Petersburg State Electrotechnical University) during 1961-1967, majoring in electronic engineering. Upon graduation Gurevich worked as an engineer for 5 years. In 1971 Gurevich enlisted into High Art College, named Muhina (now Saint Petersburg Art and Industry Academy), from which he graduated 3.5 years later; after earning a degree in Industrial Design. He worked as a decorator for 15 following years, at the same time pursuing his unofficial creative career as an artist.

== Work in the Soviet Union ==
In the 70s Gurevich took part in various exhibitions of unofficial art, as a member of so-called Fellowship of Experimental Art. In 1975 he became a member of Alef group (a group of Jewish artists, founded by Eugene Abeshaus in Leningrad.) Their landmark exhibition, which included the artists Alexander Manusov, Anatoli Basin and Alexander Okun, was viewed by four thousand people in its first week alone. Membership to the Aleph group was dangerous politically, and by 1977 the group disbanded. In 1989 he participated in the Art Festival "Creativity under Duress" in Louisville, Kentucky, USA.

== Work in Israel ==
In 1993 Gurevich together with his family emigrated to Israel. He has been living and working in Jerusalem since then. In 1994 he became a member of the Artists House (Beit Amanim) in Jerusalem. In 2008 an album about his life and art was published by Ruvim Braude in San Francisco, California, USA ("Alexander Gurevich"); with articles by B. Bernstein and N. Blagodatov.

Gurevich has had one-man exhibitions in galleries in the United States, Russia, Germany and Israel.

== Works in museums ==
- The Russian Museum
- Magnes Collection of Jewish Art and Life
- Oberhessisches_Museum, Gissen, Germany
- Osaka Contemporary Art Center
- Museum-non-conformist-art, St.Petersburg
- Museum of Art Saint Petersburg XX-XXI c.(МИСП), Russia
- Museum The Museum Of Russian Art, Minneapolis, USA

== Exhibitions ==
- 1995, Jerusalem-Artists House
- 1995, Gallery Kunstzaum Am Hallhof, Memingen, Germany
- 1996, Gallery “Serebryany vek”, S. Petersburg, Russia
- 1998, Gallery “Anna”, S. Petersburg
- 1999, Gallery “Sara Kishon”, Tel Aviv
- 1999, Oberhessisches Museum, Gissen, Germany
- 2000, Gallery “Art Dome”, San Francisco, USA
- 2002, Gallery “Kunst +” Wetzlar, Germany
- 2008, Teatron Ierushalaim, Jerusalem
- 2009, Gallery Karandagi, Tel Aviv
- 2011, Gallery “Art Dome”, San Francisco, USA
- 2012, Gallery "Beit Naima", Jerusalem
- 2015, Gallery “Colorida”, Lisbon, Portugal.
- 2019, Gallery "Art Dome", San Francisco, USA
- 2019, London Art Biennale, UK,
- 2023, TMORA (The Museum Of Russian Art), Minneapolis, USA
