= Galina Osetsimskaya =

- Осецимская Галина Романовна
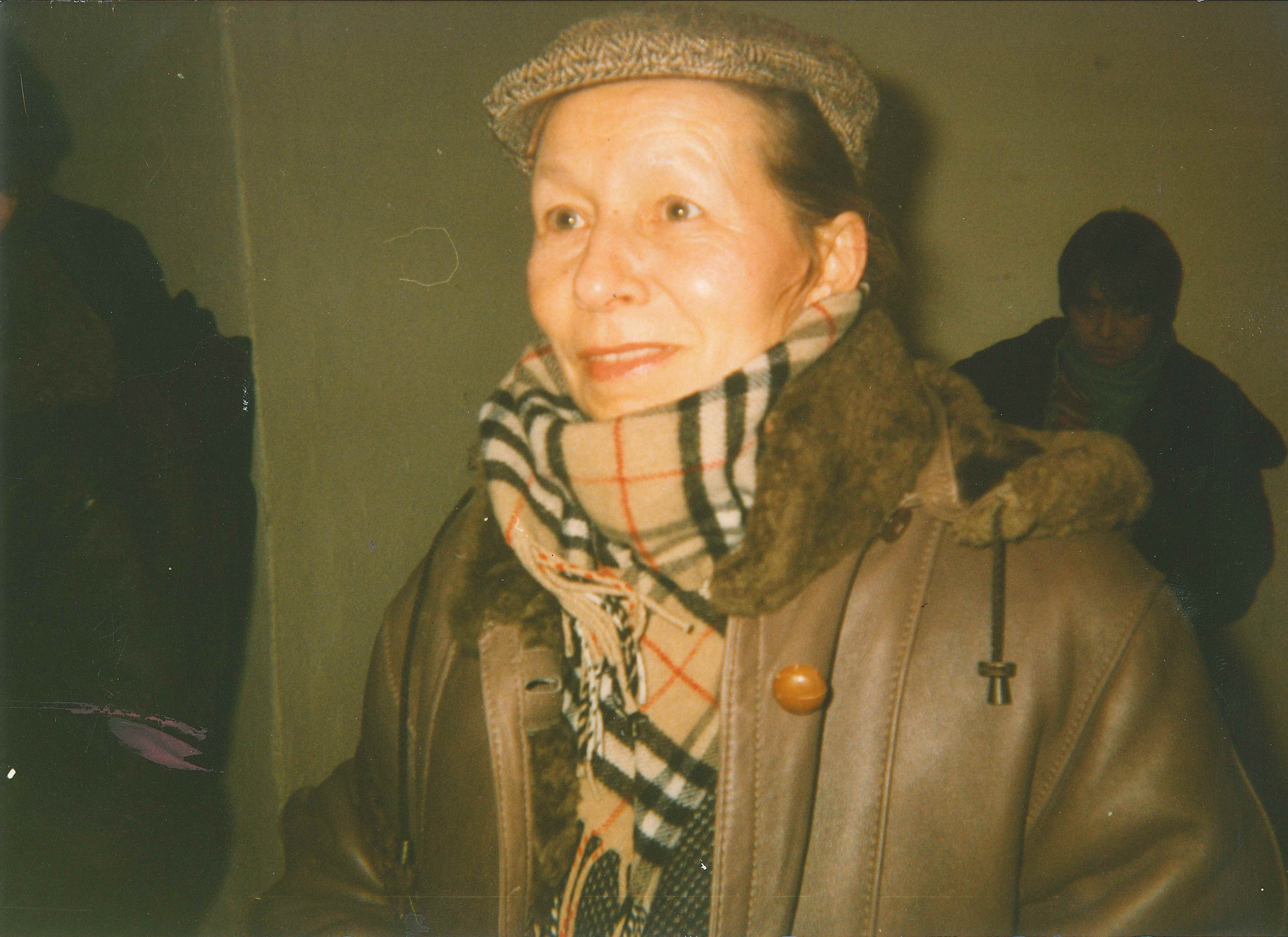
- November 1995
- Born: 1936; Moscow
- Died: 2000 (aged 63–64); Moscow
- Known for: collection of Soviet Nonconformist Art and Russian contemporary art
- Spouse: Igor Osetsimsky

Galina Osetsimskaya (Russian: Гали́на Рома́новна Осеци́мская, 1936 — 2000) was a collector of Soviet Nonconformist Art and Russian contemporary art.

== Biography ==
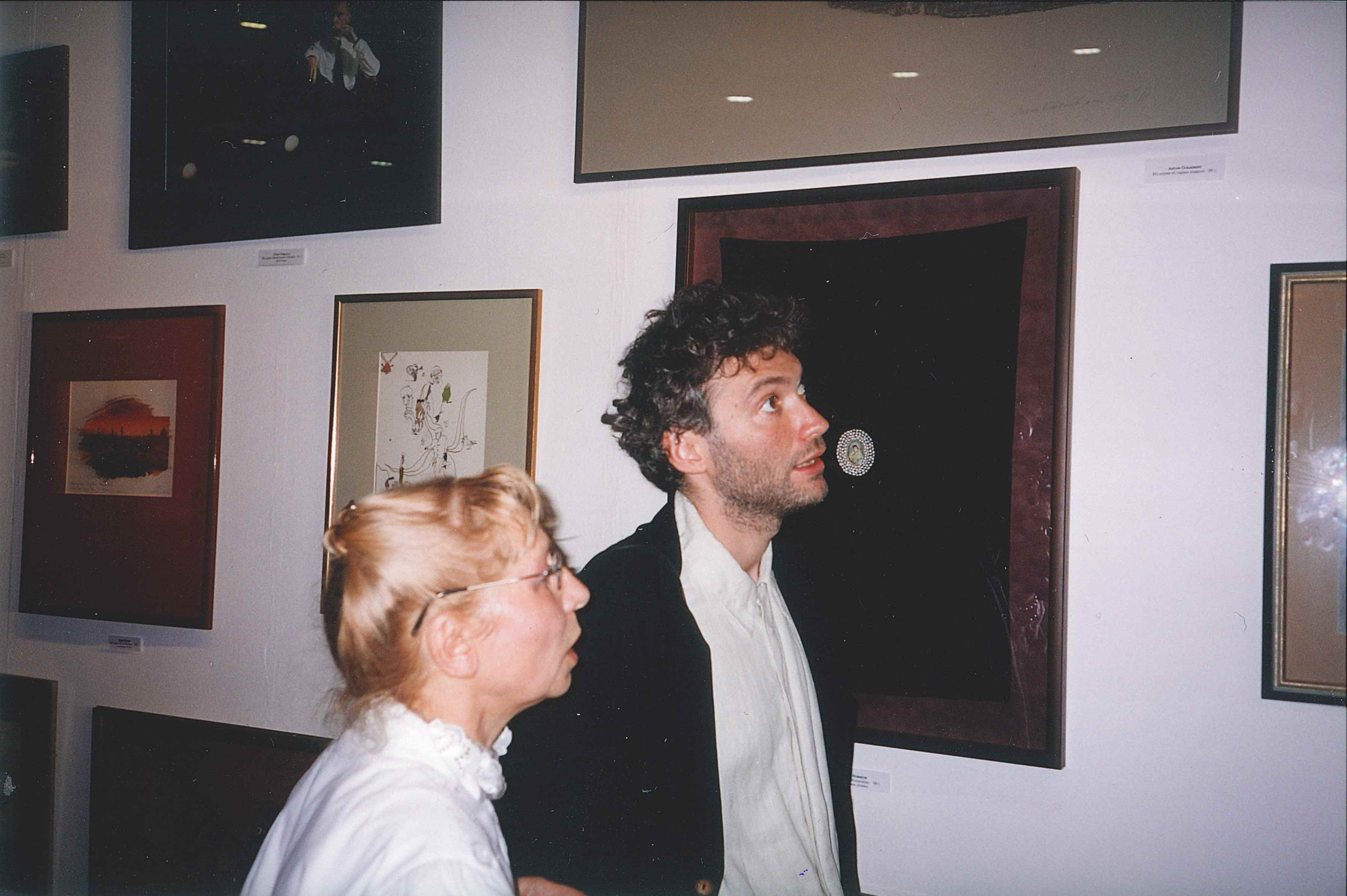
Galina Osetsimskaya and Pavel Pepperstein at the exhibition "New Russian Collections"

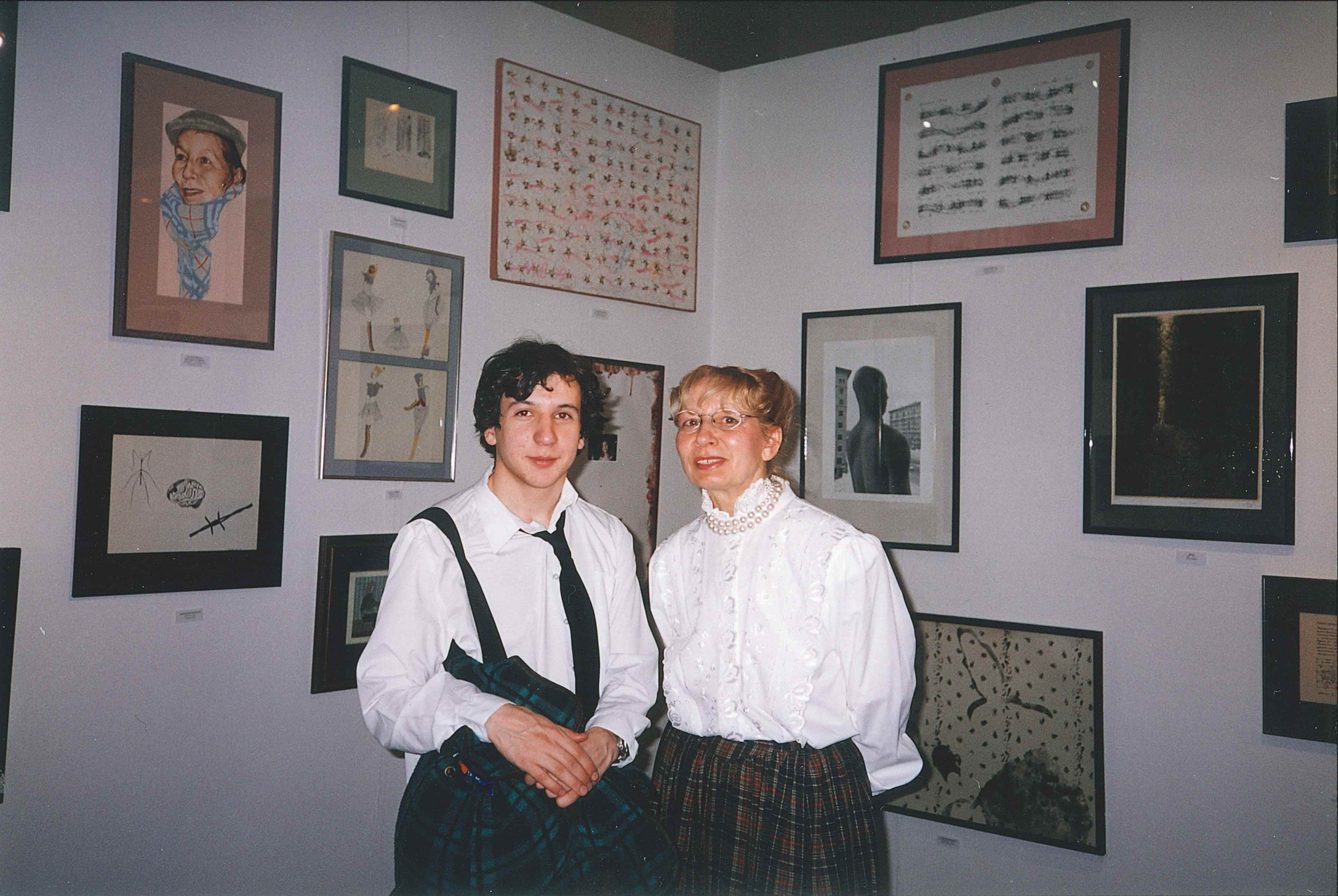
Curator Pyotr Shirkovsky and collector Galina Osetsimskaya

The emergence of Soviet Nonconformist Art started in the 1950s with the death of Joseph Stalin and the relaxation of censorship during Nikita Khrushchev's cultural thaw. The underground art wasn't prosecuted anymore, though the artists who were experimenting and challenging the canons of socialist realism had to work covertly, and the works were not permitted for public display.

At the time Galina Osetsimskaya, a professional translator and state employee, became passionate with unofficial art in the 1960s. She befriended Alexei Tyapushkin, Andrew Grositsky and other artists, visited numerous apartment exhibitions and even hosted the display of Dmitri Vrubel's early works at her own home. Although Osemitskaya obtained a number of artistic works through the 1970s, she made a conscious decision to collect and exhibit contemporary art in the early 1980s. In subsequent years for what started as a more or less random collection of works, based on her intuition, quickly grew into an impressive catalog of the most important Soviet and Russian artists of Perestroika and the 1990s.

== Collection ==
By the end of 1990s the collection owned by Galina Osetsimskaya included over 300 works by more than 60 artists, including Valery Aizenberg, Nikita Alexeev, Sergei Anufriev, Alexey Beliaev-Gintovt, Anatoly Brusilovsky, Alexander Vinogradov, Dmitri Vrubel, Andrey Grositsky, Georgy Guryanov, Dmitry Gutov, Vladimir Dubossarsky, Francisco Infante-Arana, Ilya Kabakov, Georgy Kiesewalter, Oleg Kulik, Rostislav Lebedev, Yuri Leiderman, Igor Makarevich, Bogdan Mamonov, Andrei Monastyrski, Arkady Nasonov, Vladimir Nemukhin, Timur Novikov, Anatoly Osmolovsky, Georgy Ostretsov, Pavel Pepperstein, Viktor Pivovarov, Anatoly Slepyshev, Olga Tobreluts, Alexey Tyapushkin, Aristarkh Chernyshev, Olga Chernysheva, Ivan Tschuikov, et al. The art critics rated the collection as museum-quality for its volume and comprehensiveness. It was first presented at the Art Manege fair in Moscow in 1999. After Galina Osetsimskaya died in 2000, her husband Igor Osetsimsky took the duties to expand and exhibit the collection. In 2018 he provided Moscow-based Garage Museum of Contemporary Art the archive of his wife's notes and recordings for research, digitalization and conservation in Garage's Russian Art Archive Network.

=== Exhibitions ===
- 1999 — Art Manege contemporary art fair, Moscow Manege
- 2000 — New Russian Collections, Moscow Art Center at Neglinnaya Street
- 2014 — Russisk kunst efter Perestrojka (Russian Art After Perestroyka, Sorø Art Museum, Denmark
