= Igor Kholin =

Russian poet and fiction writer

- Born: Igor Sergeyevich Kholin; 11 January 1920; Moscow
- Died: 15 June 1999 (aged 79); Moscow

Igor Sergeyevich Kholin (11 January 1920, Moscow - 15 June 1999, Moscow) was a Russian poet and fiction writer and a member of the 'Lianozovo Group'.

== Early life ==
Igor Kholin was born in Moscow in a family of a seamstress and an officer in the Imperial Russian Army, whose surname was, according to different versions, either Lvov or Kholin. The account of his father’s death is also controversial - one version says he died of typhoid, the other that he was fighting for the White Movement in the Russian Civil War, then turned Bolshevik, was taken hostage and executed by Admiral Kolchak. An account provided by Kholin’s relatives says that the poet’s grandfather owned a ballet school in Moscow, on Tverskaya street, and that his father married a country girl despite the will of the family.

Neither of those stories can be confirmed, though, since Kholin was inclined to mystify his own life. Evgeniy Lobkov, a literary critic, said that Igor Kholin’s biography is mythological and that it is not known how and where his childhood, boyhood and youth had been spent.

During the Russian Civil War Kholin’s widowed mother placed both of her children in an orphanage, fearing not to be able to provide for them. Kholin was then transferred to a different orphanage in Ryazan that was located in a former monastery, where children were sleeping in bedrooms with murals depicting martyrs’ sufferings, such as the beheading of John the Baptist. Kholin ran away from the orphanage and started living on the streets. At one point he found himself in Novorossiysk, where he entered a military college and served in the Red Army Music Corps.

== Military service ==
From 1940 to 1946, during his time in the army, Kholin saw active service and was gradually promoted to the rank of a captain of the Red Army. He had been wounded twice; one of the bullets went through the corner of his lips and out of under his shoulder blade, so he barely survived. Kholin was awarded the Order of the Red Star in 1944 and the 1st class of the Order of the Patriotic War in 1985, during the celebration of the 40th anniversary of the victory.

== Literary beginnings ==
In 1949 Kholin was sentenced to two years in a labor camp in Lianozovo by a tribunal for an administrative offense. Since Kholin was acquainted, from his army days, with a head of the labor camp security, he was allowed brief temporary leaves. It was in jail that Kholin began to write poetry, which he himself later regarded as quite poor. In a library in Lianozovo he once borrowed a book by Alexander Blok, which surprised a local librarian, who turned out to be Evgeny Kropivnitsky’s wife. She introduced Kholin to her husband, who was a leader of a group of poets, writers and artists, among which were the young Genrikh Sapgir and Oscar Rabin, Kropivnitsky’s son-in-law.

It was under Evgeny Kropivnitsky’s influence that Kholin started his creative journey in the mid 1950s. He developed his own poetic style and wrote the cycle of “barracks poems”, which in turn influenced the work of the Lianozovo group. Kholin’s friend Genrikh Sapgir introduced him to writing poems for children, but even though his works appeared in primers, Kholin had difficulties writing commissioned works. During that time he was making his living as a waiter at the Metropol restaurant and was married to Maria Kholina, also a waitress. Together they had a daughter, Lyudmila.

== Style ==
Kholin preferred to use everyday language as means of his poetic expression, instead of lyrics and imagery. By the end of 1950s Kholin was one of the leaders of Russian nonconformist poetry and of Russian avant-garde. Throughout the 1960s his works were only printed abroad, while in the USSR only his poems for children were officially published.

He was a part of Konkret, a poets’ group, alongside Genrikh Sapgir, Eduard Limonov and Vagrich Bakhchanyan.

== Publishing ==
In the beginning of 1970s Kholin wrote several poems and turned his attention to prose. From 1988 he started being published in his homeland. In the 1980s and 1990s he has published a number of separate poems, while concentrating on writing short stories.

The image of Kholin as a poet is inseparably linked to one of Genrikh Sapgir, with whom they have initially been penfriends. Sapgir had been Kropivnitsky’s student and used to write him while in army and inquire about new names in the poetic circle. That is how he and Kholin got acquainted, and their friendship has lasted for more than forty years.

In the beginning of 1970s Michail Grobman, a friend of Kholin’s, introduces him to antique trade, which not only enriched the poet’s knowledge of Russian art, both past and contemporary, but also kept bringing him a modest income for the rest of his life.

From 1972 to 1974 Kholin was in a relationship with Irina Ostrovskaya, a friend of Yelena Shchapova, Eduard Limonov’s legendary wife, to whom the latter dedicated his book “It’s me, Eddie”. A daughter of Kholin and Ostrovskaya, Arina, is an author of popular fiction.

== Death ==
Kholin died from fulminant liver cancer. He is buried at Khimkinskoye cemetery in Moscow.

An important part of Kholins personal papers can be found in the archive of the Research Centre for East European Studies at the University of Bremen (Forschungsstelle Osteuropa). The archival collection consists of his writings, samizdat and a collection of audio and video recordings of literary events in the Soviet Union.

== See also ==
- Soviet Nonconformist Art
- Genrikh Sapgir
