= Viktor Perelman =

Russian journalist

Viktor Borisovich Perelman
- Виктор Борисович Перельман
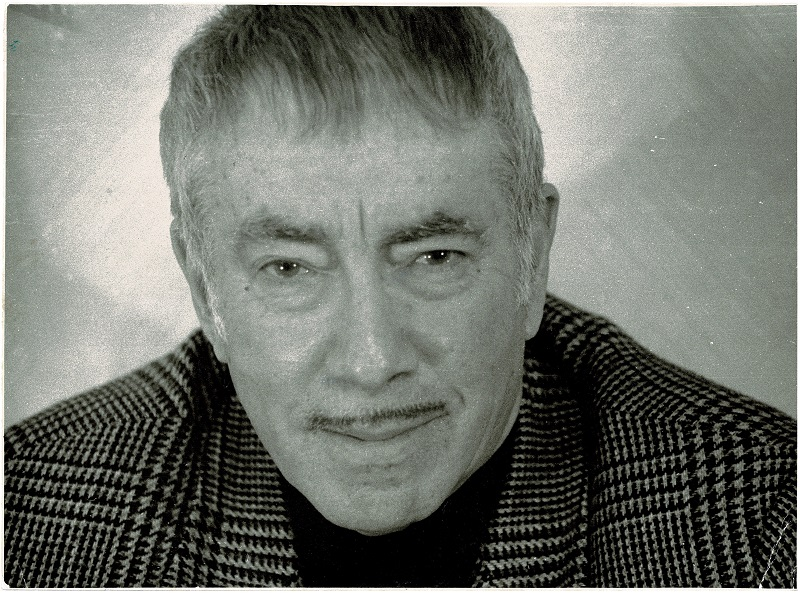
- Viktor Perelman in 2000 celebrating the 25th anniversary of his 'Vrema I My' magazine
- Born: July 15, 1929; Moscow, Russia
- Died: November 13, 2003 (aged 74); New Jersey, United States
- Occupations: writer, journalist, publisher, editor, and dissident
- Spouse: Alla Abramovna Svet (m. 1961, his death)
- Children: Irina Perelman-Grabois
- Writing career
- Pen name: Viktor Perelman, Viktor Petrovsky, Viktor Aleksandrovsky
- Language: Russian
- Years active: 1952–2001
- Notable works: Editor-in-chief of 'Time and We' magazine (1975–2001), 'Forsaken Russia' (1977), 'Theatre of the Absurd' (1984), 'Forsaken Russia: Journalist in a Closed Society' (1989)
- Notable awards: Second Prize for Dissident Literature in Translation from the Hebrew University in Jerusalem, Israel
- Website: viktorperelman-timeandwejournal.com

Viktor Borisovich Perelman (Russian: Виктор Борисович Перельман) (July 15, 1929 – November 13, 2003), was a Russian-language journalist, writer, publisher, editor, and dissident. He was the founder and sole editor-in-chief of a leading third wave Russian immigration international democratic journal for literary and social problems, "Time and We" or "Vremya I My" (Russian: "Время и Мы") from 1975 to 2001. In addition, he was the author of two autobiographical novels, one fiction novel, and dozens of published articles in leading Russian language newspapers and other press. As the founder of Time and We Publishing House, he published several Russian language books by well-known authors of third wave Russian immigration.

== Biography ==
Viktor Perelman was born on July 15, 1929, in Moscow, Russia (then Russian SFSR, Soviet Union).

In 1951, he graduated with a degree from Moscow State University Faculty of Law (Russian: МГУ) and obtained a Publishing and Editing degree from the Moscow Polygraphic Institute Faculty of Journalism (now known as the Moscow State University of Printing Arts).

In the 1950s, he worked at Radio Moscow, at the newspaper "Trud" (Russian: Труд), was the head of the Economics division of the magazine "Soviet Trade Unions" (Russian: Cоветские Профсоюзы), at "Moskovskij Komsomolets" (Russian: Московский Комсомолец), "Sovietskaya Rossiya" (Russian: Советская Россия), and "Pravda" (Russian: Правда).

In 1968, he was invited to take on the position of the Head of Information Department of "Literaturnaya Gazeta" (Russian: Литературная Газета). He was dismissed from the "Literaturnaya Gazeta" following his application for permission to emigrate to Israel in 1972. His dissident articles, among them "Reflections Before the Auction," which described his opposition to the Soviet Government imposing an education tax on Jewish emigrants, were translated and published in Western newspapers, including the New York Times.

After a struggle with Soviet authorities as a Jewish "Refusenik", he was allowed by the Soviet government to emigrate to Israel in 1973, where he worked as a correspondent for the Israeli newspaper "Al Hamishmar", and a special correspondent for Radio Liberty (Russian: Радио Свобода).

In 1975, in Tel Aviv, Israel, he founded a thick Russian language magazine for literary and socio-political problems, "Vremya I My" or "Time and We" (Russian: Время и Мы). He was the magazine's sole editor-in-chief until 2001. He published altogether 152 issues of "Vremya I My", giving a tribune to over 2200 authors and over 100 artists. "Vremya I My" had headquarters in Israel, France, Russia (in its later years), with its main office located in the United States since 1981. Over 150 Slavic Departments of universities around the globe were subscribed to “Time and We” magazine over the 25 years of its existence, with a full archive of 152 issues still available in their library catalogs today. The full archive is also available at the library of the National Endowment for Democracy, an organization from which 'Time and We' had been receiving a grant for over 10 years. A full electronic archive of 152 issues of "Time and We" is also available on the electronic library "ImWerden". Viktor Perelman published works by many literary figures of the Russian diaspora, such as poet Alexander Galich, and writers Viktor Nekrasov, Boris Khazanov, and Friedrich Gorenstein. Perelman wrote over 50 essays in "Vremya I My" and reviewed over 100 artists in his magazine under the pen name Viktor Petrovsky, including Mikhail Chemiakin, Ernst Neizvestny, Mikhail Turovsky, Komar and Melamid, Mikhail Belomlinsky, and Oscar Rabin. Sixty-six covers of "Vrema I My" magazine were illustrated by a Russian-American artist Vagrich Bakhchanyan.

After his immigration to the United States with an EB-1A Green Card, Perelman's essays were often published in various Russian language publications in the West such as Russkaya Mysl, Novoe Ruskoe Slovo, Panorama, Evreyskaya Gazetta, Megapolis Express, Boston Time, and others. In Russia, following the collapse of the Soviet Union, he also appeared in Russian publications such as Ogoniok, Rodina, and Yunost.

Perelman was known to discover the writer Boris Khazanov (Russian: Борис Хазанов) and his Time and We Publishing House was the first to translate to the Russian language “KGB Today: The Hidden Hand” by American journalist John Barron (Russian: КГБ Сегодня).

Viktor Perelman died on November 13, 2003, after a long illness, at his home in Cliffside Park, New Jersey. He was 74 years old. He is buried in Paramus, New Jersey. He is survived by his wife, Alla Perelman, his only daughter, Irina Perelman-Grabois, and three American-born grandchildren Mark Grabois, Lara Grabois and Victoria Grabois.

== Books ==
Perelman was the author of an autobiographical novel in Russian, "Forsaken Russia" (Russian: Покинутая Россия), depicting the struggles of a journalist within a Soviet society governed by heavily censored state press. Its first edition was published in 1977 and its second edition was published in 1989. In 1977, the first two-book edition of "Forsaken Russia" won the Second Prize for Dissident Literature in Translation from the Hebrew University in Jerusalem, Israel. In 1981, he wrote and published a second autobiographical novel "The Theater of Absurd" (Russian: Театр Абсурда), described by him as "comedic-philosophical narrative of my two emigrations: the experience of anti-memoirs”. In 1992, he wrote a fiction novel titled “The Sinful Fall of Caesar” (Russian: Грехопадение Цезаря). His three books are available at university libraries around the globe.

Viktor Perelman also ran the "Time and We Publishing House," wherein he published the following books:

- John Barron. "KGB Today." First ever translation to Russian. (1984). (Russian: Джон Бэррон. "КГБ сегодня.")
- Aleksander Orlov. "The Secret History of Stalin Crimes." (1991). (Russian: Александр Орлов. "Тайная история Сталинскиx преступлений.")
- Vladimir Soloviyov & Elena Klepikova. "The Battle in Kremlin: from Andropov to Gorbachev." (1986). (Russian: Владимир Соловьев и Елена Клепикова. "Бopьба в Кремле: от Андропова до Горбачева.")
- Boris Khazanov. "Me, Resurrection, and Life." (1985). (Russian: Борис Хазанов. "Я Воскресение и Жизнь.")
- Gordon Brooke-Shefferd. "The Faith of Soviet Defectors." (1983). (Russian: Гордон Брук-Шефферд. "Судьба советских перебежчиков.")
- Time and We Publishing House (New York). "Almanac of 'Time and We' 1990: Hands Off Venus de Milo." Featuring A. Galich, S. Dovlatov, A. Kestler, and an interview with Joseph Brodsky. (1990). (Russian: Издательствo Время и мы (Нью-Йорк). "Альманах 'Время и мы' 1990: Руки прочь от Венеры Милосской.")
- Albin Michel Publishing House (Paris), and Time and We Publishing House (New York). "Le Temps et Nous." 'Time and We' almanac 1990 translated into French. (1990).
