= Moscow Conceptualists =

Russian artistic movement

The Moscow Conceptualist, or Russian Conceptualist, artistic and literary movement began with the Sots art of Komar and Melamid in the early 1970s Soviet Union, and continued as a trend in Soviet nonconformist art into the 1980s. It attempted to subvert socialist ideology using the strategies of western conceptual art and appropriation art. It was an artistic counterpoint to Socialist Realism, and the artists experimented aesthetically in a wide range of media, including painting, sculpture, performance, and literature. As Joseph Bakshtein explained, "The creation of this nonconformist tradition was impelled by the fact that an outsider in the Soviet empire stood alone against a tremendous state machine, a great Leviathan that threatened to engulf him. To preserve one's identity in this situation, one had to create a separate value system, including a system of aesthetic values."

== Overview ==
The central figures of the movement were Ilya Kabakov, Irina Nakhova, Viktor Pivovarov, Eric Bulatov, Andrei Monastyrski, Komar and Melamid, poets Vsevolod Nekrasov (ru), Dmitri Prigov, Lev Rubinstein, Anna Alchuk, Timur Kibirov, artist and prose writer Vladimir Sorokin, and also such writers as Viktor Yerofeyev and Julia Kissina.

Mikhail Epstein explains why conceptualism is particularly appropriate to the culture and history of Russia, but also how it differs from Western Conceptualism:

In the West, conceptualism substitutes "one thing for another" — a real object for its verbal description. But in Russia the object that should be replaced is simply absent.values."

Epstein quotes Ilya Kabakov:

This contiguity, closeness, touchingness, contact with nothing, emptiness makes up, we feel, the basic peculiarity of 'Russian conceptualism'... It is like something that hangs in the air, a self-reliant thing, like a fantastic construction, connected to nothing, with its roots in nothing... So, then, we can say that our own local thinking, from the very beginning in fact, could have been called 'conceptualism'.

The Moscow Conceptualist artists faced difficulties exhibiting their work in the cultural atmosphere of the late Soviet Union. At the Manezh exhibit of 1962, which featured the work of many aesthetic precursors to the Moscow Conceptualists, then-Party first secretary Nikita Khrushchev excoriated the art and artists he saw there. In 1974, at the infamous Bulldozer Exhibition, many Moscow Conceptualist artists had their work destroyed when the Soviet authorities brought in bulldozers to clear the field in which the exhibition was held. The art movement was largely ignored outside of the Soviet Union, and within it, it was confined to a narrow circle of Moscow artists and their friends.

== See also ==
- Russian postmodernism
- Soviet nonconformist art
- Neo-conceptual art

== Sources ==
- Bakshtein, Joseph (1995). "A View from Moscow". In Rosenfeld, Alla; Dodge, Norton T. (eds.). Nonconformist Art: The Soviet Experience 1956 – 1986. London: Thames and Hudson. ISBN 0-500-23709-3.
- Epstein, Mikhail (1995). After the Future: The Paradoxes of Postmodernism and Contemporary Russian Culture. Amherst: University of Massachusetts Press. ISBN 0870239732.
- Epstein, Mikhail; Genis, Alexander; Vladiv-Glover, Slobodanka (2016) [1999]. Russian Postmodernism: New Perspectives on Post-Soviet Culture. Translated by Slobodanka Vladiv-Glover (Rev. ed.). New York; Oxford: Berghahn Books. ISBN 978-1-78238-864-7.
- Kahn, Andrew; Lipovetsky, Mark; Reyfman, Irina; Sandler, Stephanie (2018). A History of Russian Literature. Oxford: Oxford University Press. ISBN 9780199663941.
