= Anatoly Belkin =

Russian artist

Anatoly Pavlovich Belkin (Russian: Анатолий Павлович Белкин; born 1953) is a contemporary Russian artist based in St. Petersburg.

One of his better-known works was the 2004 exhibition Swamp Gold at the State Hermitage Museum in Saint Petersburg. The elaborate installation was composed of over 300 objects purporting to be evidence of the existence of a swamp-dwelling gnomish people in ancient Europe. It was created in collaboration with archaeologists from the museum and dealt with themes such as the disappearance of indigenous cultures and the loss of self in modern times.

Belkin studied art at the Repin Institute of Arts in Saint Petersburg and became one of the youngest members of the Soviet Nonconformist Art movement which consisted of artists who risked government persecution for exhibiting their work at shows not sponsored or sanctioned by the Soviet state.

Belkin's works are part of major museum collections in Russia and Europe, including Hermitage Museum in Saint Petersburg and Pushkin State Museum of Fine Arts in Moscow.
