= Genrikh Sapgir =

Russian poet

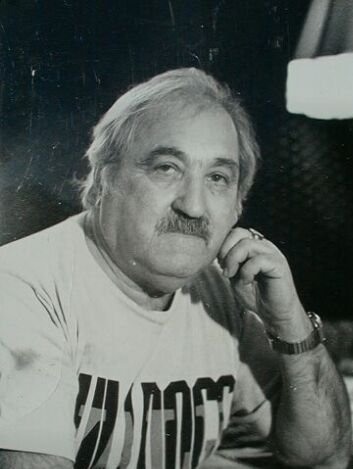
Genrikh Sapgir in 1992

Genrikh Sapgir (Russian: Ге́нрих Вениами́нович Сапги́р; November 20, 1928, Biysk, Altai Krai, Russia – October 7, 1999, Moscow) was a Russian poet and fiction writer of Jewish descent.

== Biography ==
He was born in Biysk to a family of a Moscow engineer on a business trip. The family returned to Moscow fairly soon. In 1944 he joined the course of creative writing tutored by the artist and writer Evgeny Kropivnitsky. Together with some other of Kropivnitsky's students he later formed the so-called Lianozovo School of poets and writers, part of the Soviet Nonconformist Art movement. Since 1959 Sapgir published his poetry for children. His other poems appeared only in émigré magazines, such as Continent and Strelets (The Archer).

According to Anatoly Kudryavitsky,

"Genrikh Sapgir is the most prominent figure of the writers that came to be associated with the now well-known 'Lianozovo Group', which also included Vsevolod Nekrasov (1934-2009) and Igor Kholin (1920-1999). These Moscow poets sought out new models and positions and exploited the possibilities of inserting common speech directly in their texts. Each of them had a Dostoyevskian eye for everyday Russian life, which made their work immediately accessible."

=== During the perestroika period ===
Since 1989 his poetry, short stories, plays and novels have been widely published in Russia. Three volumes of his Collected Poems appeared at the end of the 1990s. He represented Russia at numerous international festivals of poetry, his work has been published in translation throughout the world. There are English translations by Jim Kates, Anatoly Kudryavitsky and Artyom Kotenko & Anthony Weir. Andrew Bromfield published his translations of Sapgir's 'Very Short Stories'. Sapgir was the recipient of various awards including the Pushkin Prize for poetry.

In 1999 he died of a heart attack in a Moscow trolley-bus on his way to the launch of the anthology of contemporary Russian poetry entitled "Poetry of Silence".

In Sapgir's biography published in 2004, David Shrayer-Petrov called him an "avant-garde classic".

== Books in English translation ==
- Psalms. Translated by Jim Kates. Cold Hub Press, 2012.
