= Igor Sinyavin =

- Синявин Игорь Иванович
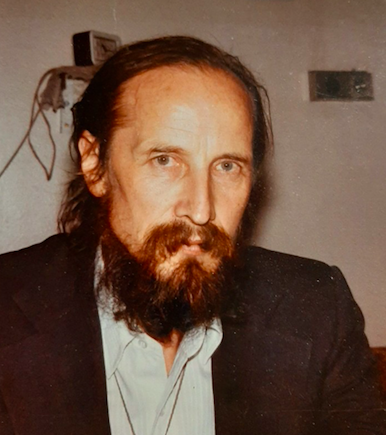
- Born: October 10, 1937; Sinyavino, Leningrad Region of Russia
- Died: February 15, 2000 (aged 62)
- Occupations: Artist, Writer, Activist
- Years active: 1960s - 1990s
- Known for: Soviet nonconformist art
- Style: Constructive Abstractionism

Igor Sinyavin (Russian: Игорь Синявин; October 10, 1937 – February 15, 2000) was a Soviet Nonconformist painter. His artistic and written work provides insight into Soviet censorship and struggle for artistic independence.

== Early life and education ==
Igor Sinyavin (1937-2000) was born in the village of Sinyavino in the Leningrad region of Russia. He studied at the Military Topographic College, the Leningrad State University, later at the Faculty of History at the Department of Art History, but did not graduate.

== Nonconformist Art and Prosecution ==
As he was a member of the nonconformist art scene in the USSR, he was often subject to political prosecution. During the 1960s he worked with other nonconformist painters and organized exhibitions in Moscow and Leningrad. He began to independently engage in drawing and painting in 1969, and participated in apartment exhibitions where he discussed the problems of contemporary art.

He presented his art at the Bulldozer Exhibition (September 15, 1974), an unofficial exhibition that ended with several arrests and the destruction of the participants' art.

Since the Bulldozer Exhibition aroused international news coverage and strong public disapproval, and Soviet authorities reluctantly agreed to allow two nonconformist exhibitions. Becoming a prominent member of the Soviet non-conformist art scene, he was on the organizing committee and presented his works in the first Soviet permitted non-conformist exhibitions in the Izmailovsky Park in Moscow (September 29, 1974) and in Leningrad (December 22–25, 1974). During the Leningrad exhibit, Sinyavin presented a blank canvas and invited visitors to sign their names with a marker. This collage of names along with the high attendance demonstrated the public's support for the nonconformist movement and angered the Soviet authorities.

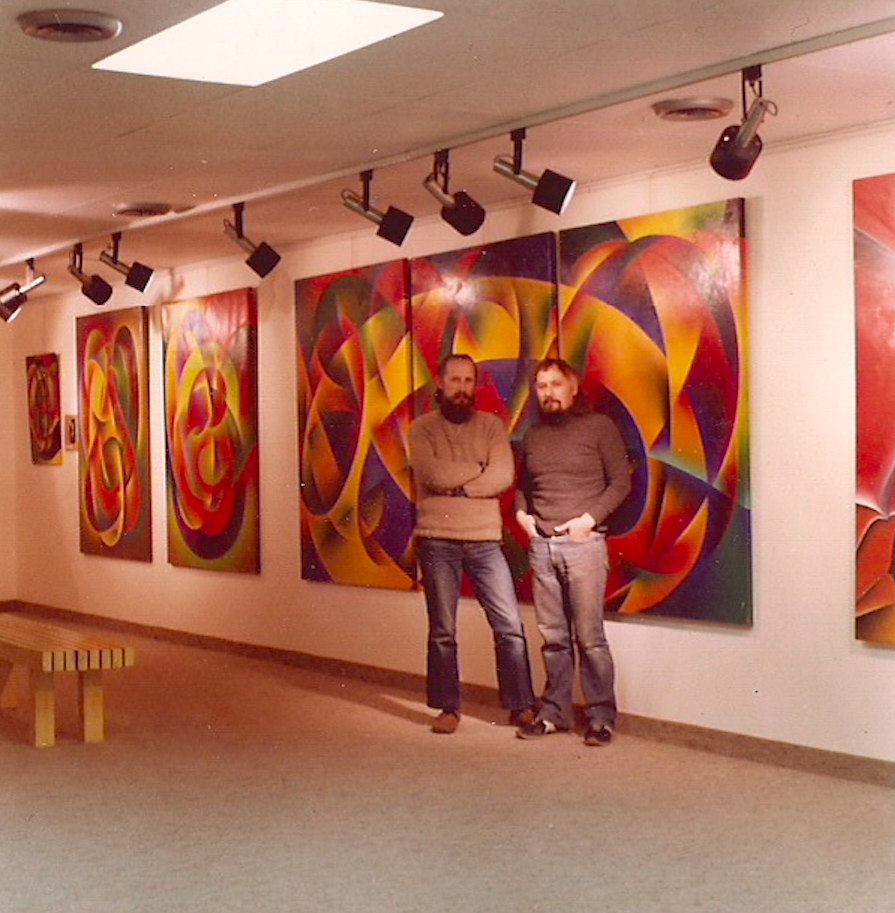
Igor Sinyavin presenting his work at an exhibit in New York in 1978.

On December 15, 1975, Sinyavin, along with other nonconformist artists and poets, staged a poetry-reading on the Senate Square to commemorate the sesquicentennial of the Decembrists' uprising. Sinyavin was detained by the police.

=== Emigration to the United States ===
In May 1976, Sinyavin exhibited his works in an unauthorized open-air exhibition and was detained and put under house arrest. The KGB pressured Sinyavin to emigrate in 1976, and he left for Vienna on his way to New York, United States. Like most immigrants emigrating from the Soviet Union, he was given an exit visa listing Israel as his destination. He returned to the USSR in 1986.

=== Style ===
Sinyavin was a constructive abstractionist. While the Soviet Union only permitted art that pertained Socialist Realism and glorified communist values, his art focused on geometric shapes and patterns. In his memoir, Glas (Russian: Глас), he describes his modernist style "as a force capable of liberating a person and creating a new world of excellence" and one that "brings chaos from the bowels of the subconscious mind."

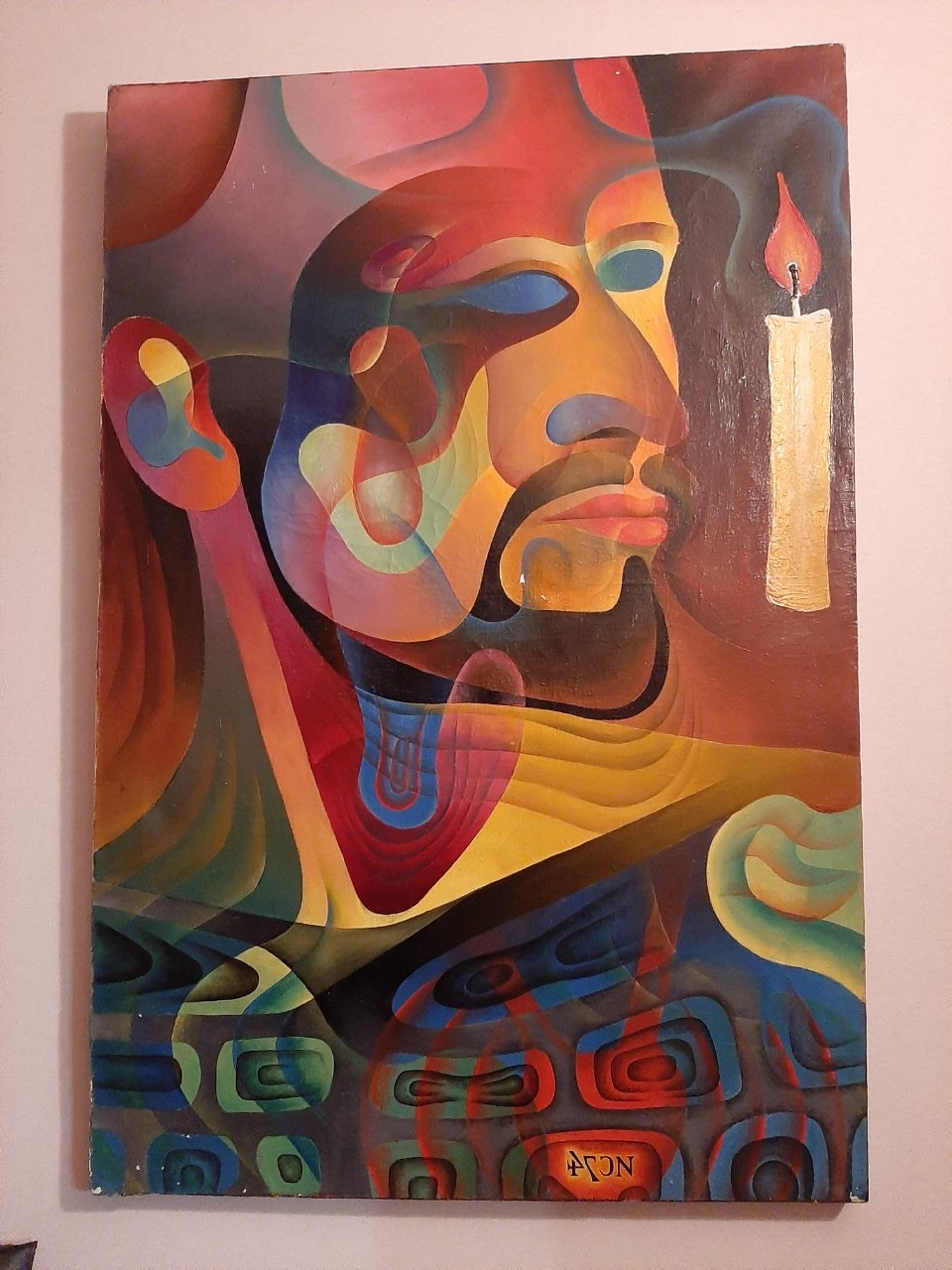
Title: Self-portrait (Russian: Автопотрет) Date: 1974

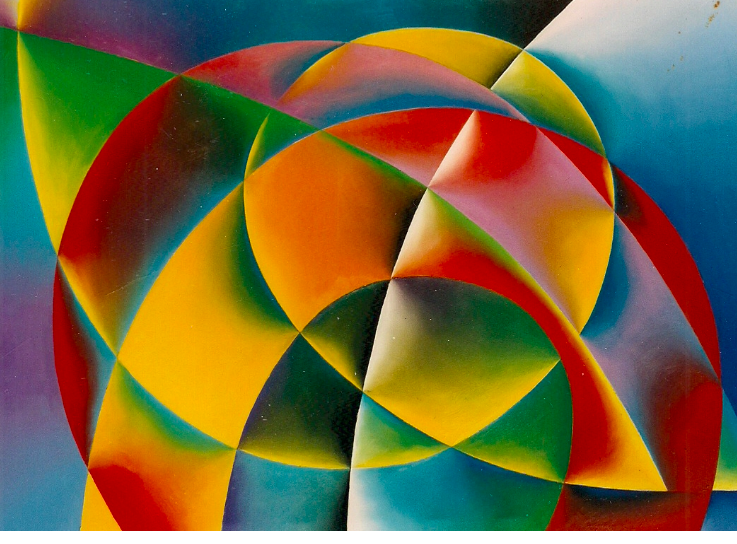
Title: Triptych (Russian: Триптих). One section of a three canvas artwork.

== Authorship ==
Sinyavin contributed to several political magazines, wrote multiple articles, and published two books. In early 1976, he wrote the almanac "Petersburg Meetings" (Russian: "Петербургские Встречи") for the underground magazine Samizdat, in which he criticized the practices and policies of the Soviet Union. He also wrote the article "To the Creator" (Russian: "Человеку творящему") for Samizdat.

Sinyavin was a member of the editorial board for the magazine "Time Measure" (Russian: "Мера времени") along with Yu. Voznesenskaya, G. Trifonov, and V. Filimonov. He wrote poems and created graphics for the magazine. The KGB disrupted its release.

In 1984, the newspaper Leningradskaya Pravda published his "Letter from There", in which he illustrated and criticized the American way of life and condemned the idea of emigration. After this article was written, Sinyavin came to the USSR and appeared on Soviet press and television.

=== Books ===
- Glas (Russian: Глас) (1991)
- The Path of Truth (Russian: Стези Правды) (1996)
