= Boris Chetkov =

Russian painter

Boris Alexandrovitch Chetkov (Russian: Борис Александрович Четков; 27 October 1926–6 September 2010) was a Russian painter and glass artist whose works ranged across genres but can be loosely aligned with Expressionism, Abstract Expressionism and Figurative Expressionism. His theories on art and use of colour also align him broadly with Modernism and Kandinsky though in his painting he worked largely in isolation from his peers and remained disconnected from the international art community until the end of Communism. He was a member of the Saint Petersburg Union of Artists.

Chetkov's work can be found in private collections around the world as well as in the Hermitage Museum and the State Russian Museum in St Petersburg. His was the opening exhibition for Russian Art Week in 2013.

== Life ==
Chetkov was born into a well-off peasant family in Novaya Lyalya, Sverdlovsk Oblast in 1926. In the 1930s his family were forced to give up their land during collectivisation, and for several years he travelled with his parents around various collective farms and factories in the Urals as they looked for work. In 1942, aged 16, Chetkov was arrested for 'hooliganism' and placed in the Gulag system, ending up at the penal colony near Nizhny Tagil, the same one at which Armin Stromberg was interred, at about the same time. In 1944 he was conscripted into a tank regiment in the Russian army and saw action in Latvia during the Courland Pocket blockade at the end of World War II.

Chetkov did not receive any formal art education until 1949-1952 when he studied under art historian Vladimir Eifert, one-time Director of the Pushkin Museum, who had been exiled to Karaganda in 1941

Chetkov then studied at the Tavricheskaya Art School from 1952/3-1954, but did not graduate as he contracted brucellosis and nearly died. After his recovery he studied at the Stroganov Moscow State University of Arts and Industry (1960-1965), where he was taught by Sergey Gerasimov. He was forced to leave the university after his views on western art and artistic freedom displeased Communist party members. He transferred to, and graduated from, Saint Petersburg State Art and Industry Academy in 1966.

Chetkov was Chief Glass Artist of the First Communist Volunteer Corps 1BBW (1КДО) Glass Factory in Malaya Vishera from 1967-1979. Chetkov frequently experimented with different finishes and techniques, including Venetian techniques. He stated, "Working with glass is enchanting, it carries you away, liberates your fantasy; the artist becomes a magician when he creates an object from a shapeless hot paste… Glass gave fire to my soul, and it left a deep burn in it.". His art glass was exhibited around the world from the 1970s onwards, but under the umbrella of ‘artist of the Soviet Union’ rather than under his own name.

== Works in paint ==
A Walk, 1992-1993, acrylic on canvas

For most of his artistic life Chetkov painted in isolation as his work did not conform with Communist-approved Socialist Realism. He returned repeatedly to certain genres: still life, landscape, equine art, abstract expressionism, portraiture and music, continuously experimenting with new colour palettes and media. Chetkov was also influenced by nostalgia for his early childhood experiences on his grandfather's farm, frequently harking back to an idealised, pre-Stalin version of country life in glass works and in his genre and landscape paintings.

As a young artist Chetkov experimented with Modernist themes, techniques and materials. Upon joining the 1КДО glass factory in 1967, working with colour in glass influenced his painting. He developed a rich colour palette and a glassy application style, which make his paintings 'glow' as if lit from the inside rather than from an external light source. He would also apply painterly techniques to his glass-making, feeding the two media back and forth. It was during this time that Chetkov painted the majority of his portraits.

After leaving the factory in 1979, once again due to issues with the Communist party, Chetkov went through a period of emotional difficulty in which his artistic output dramatically reduced, and his colour scheme became notably more drab. From about 1987, and accelerated by the dissolution of the Soviet Union in 1989, he returned to a higher level of output, painting some 400 pieces during the early 1990s, including many Abstract works.

Edge of the Forest, 2007, oil on canvas

From about 1995 onwards Chetkov's works in paint gained notice outside Russia. He had solo exhibitions in Germany, Russia and The US, and participated in group exhibitions in Australia, Japan and China. Most recently his posthumous solo show in the UK was also the opening exhibition of Russian Art Week 2013

Chetkov was a friend of Ernst Fuchs who admired his art glass and encouraged Chetkov to promote his paintings as Fantastic Realism. Art historian Irina G. Mikhailova considered him to be the founder member of the Saint Petersburg School of Fantastic Realism and wrote a monograph on the artist
