= Vladimir Yankilevsky =

Russian painter (1938–2018)

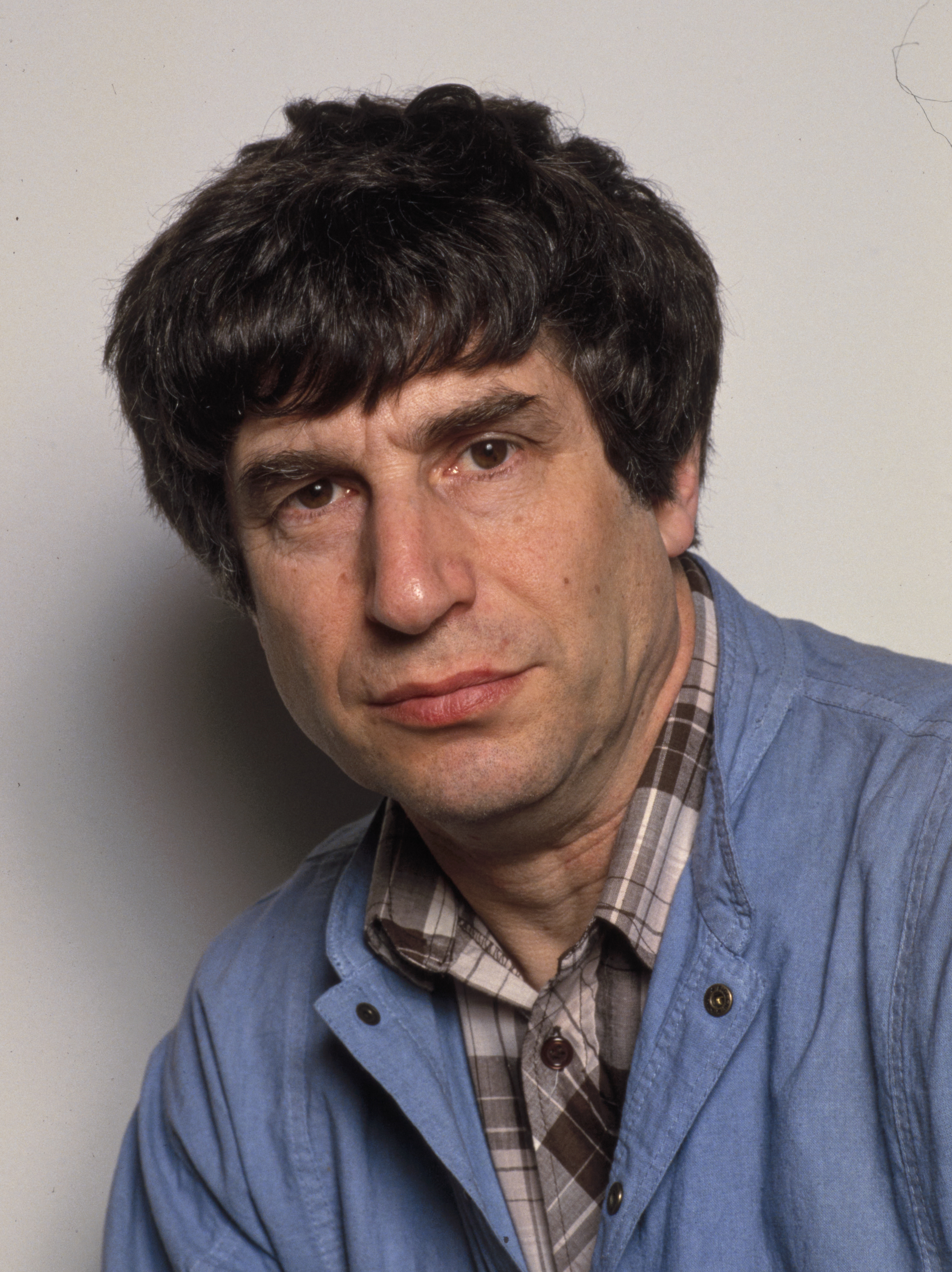
- Yankilevsky in the mid-1970s
- Born: February 15, 1938; Moscow, Russia
- Died: January 4, 2018 (aged 79); Paris, France
- Style: Soviet nonconformist art

Vladimir Borisovich Yankilevsky (Russian: Владимир Борисович Янкилевский) (February 15, 1938 – January 4, 2018) was a Russian artist known mostly for his participation in the Soviet nonconformist art movement of the 1960s through the 1980s. Perhaps his most famous works are his triptychs, which use disorienting, often nightmarish imagery to represent restrictive mental states associated with daily life in the Soviet Union, and with the human condition in general. He also participated in the Manezh Art Exhibit of 1962, during which Nikita Khrushchev chastised the nonconformist art movement as degenerate.

In the 1970s, with the assistance of gallerist and art collector Dina Vierny, Yankilevsky relocated from Moscow to Paris. The works of Yankilevsky and other nonconformist artists were featured in the exhibition "Russian Avant-Garde - Moscow 1973" at Vierny's Saint-Germain-des-Prés gallery. Yankilevsky continued to live in Paris with his wife Rimma until he died of leukemia on January 4, 2018 at the age of 79.

== Bibliography ==
- Yankilevsky, Vladimir. The State Russian Museum Presents: Vladimir Yankilevsky. Moment of Eternity. (Exh. cat.). Yevgenia Petrova. St. Petersburg: Palace Editions, 2007. ISBN 978-3-938051-81-8 (International)
- The Experimental Group: Ilya Kabakov, Moscow Conceptualism, Soviet Avant-Gardes By Matthew Jesse Jackson
- Forbidden Art: The Postwar Russian Avant-garde, Art Center College of Design (Pasadena, Calif.), Gosudarstvennyĭ russkiĭ muzeĭ (Saint Petersburg, Russia), Curatorial Assistance, Incorporated, 1998 Original from the University of Michigan Digitized Nov 9, 2007 ISBN 978-1881616917 Length 326 pages
