= Viktor Pivovarov =

Russian painter

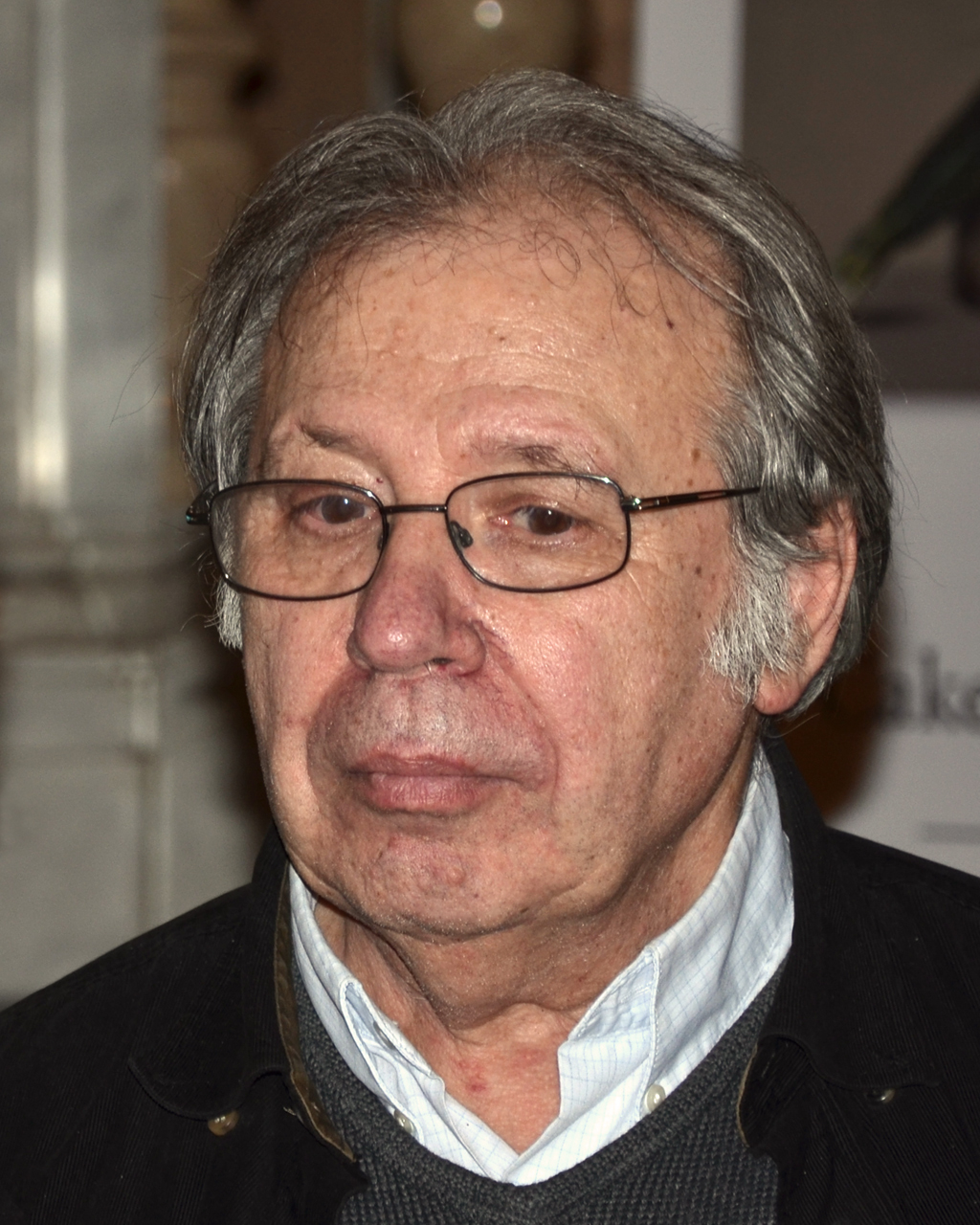
Viktor Pivovarov 2014

Viktor Dmitrievich Pivovarov (Russian: Виктор Дмитриевич Пивоваров; born 1937) is a Russian artist who lives in Prague since 1982. He represented Soviet Nonconformist Art and was one of the leading artists of the Moscow Conceptualist artistic movement of the 1970s, along with Ilya Kabakov, Erik Bulatov, and Irina Nakhova. His work reflected the complete ideologization of the Soviet lifestyle, often simultaneously expressing criticism and nostalgia for this lifestyle. Nakhova relates that Pivovarov was a major influence and first inspired her to paint.

Pivovarov was also a prolific illustrator of children's books, with over 50 books to his credit. He moved from Moscow to Prague in 1982, and continues to live there to date.

== Recent work ==
=== Lemon Eaters ===
A series of paintings in which the subjects are eating lemons. It has been interpreted as a variation of Vincent van Gogh's "The Potato Eaters". The Potato Eaters is van Gogh's attempt at expressing the satisfaction of enjoying the fruits of hard, honest work, while the Lemon Eaters depicts heroes with a rather more complicated relationship to consumption.

=== Foxes and holidays ===
The preamble to this album of drawings with text, is that Joseph Stalin created a region, Jewish Autonomous Oblast in the Russian Far East where thousands of Jews were sent. Some were exiled and some went willingly to create a Jewish state in the Russian Far East. After the death of Stalin, many of them left the region, and those that remained mixed with the local Russian and Chinese populations. In this way, a subculture was created which included elements of Russian Orthodoxy, Taoist-Buddhism, Judaism and paganism. This subculture has cult of holy foxes. That is, for every moment of a person's life, there is a specific fox-character that helps a person contend with their life challenges. Each of these fox-characters has its own holiday.
