= Eugene Abeshaus =

Eugene Abeshaus (also spelled Evgeny Abezgauz, Евгений Абезгауз in Russian; 1939–2008) was a Jewish artist who worked in Russia (then USSR) and Israel.

== Biography ==
Born in Leningrad to a typical intelligentsia family, Abeshaus was educated as an electrical engineer but soon abandoned his career and enrolled in the Mukhina School for Applied Art. By the time of his graduation from the famous “Mukha” (Fly in Russian), he had already developed a critical stance towards the official Soviet art dominated by the Communist ideology and began exhibiting at semi-underground exhibitions. This was culminated by his taking part in a famous 1975 exhibition at the Nevsky Palace of Culture. Abeshaus was fired from his job and censured by the official press – which however admitted his "artistic taste, a good sense of color and form".

== Career ==
Soon afterwards, Abeshaus set up, together with several Jewish artists, the Alef Group and became its leader. The group's first exhibition in November 1975 was held at Abeshauses’ small apartment. According to the Alef Manifesto written by Alec Rappoport, “We are trying to conquer the influence of small-town Jewish art and find sources for our work in deeper, wiser, and more spiritual European culture, and from it build a bridge to today and tomorrow".

In May 1976, some of Abeshaus's works, clandestinely sneaked out of the country, were exhibited at the Berkeley Art Museum to much critical acclaim. Later in the same year, following some political bargain between Leonid Brezhnev and President Jimmy Carter, Abeshaus and his family were finally permitted to leave the USSR for Israel.

Since then Abeshaus lived and worked in Ein Hod, a picturesque artists’ village near Haifa founded by Marcel Janco. His works were exhibited at numerous exhibitions, including dozens one-artist shows, in Israel, USA, Europe and, after the collapse of the USSR in 1991, in Russia. A posthumous solo exhibit of his work was staged in 2009 at the Russian Museum in St.Petersburg.

He is an honorary citizen of Kentucky and Kansas.
