= Vagrich Bakhchanyan =

Russian painter

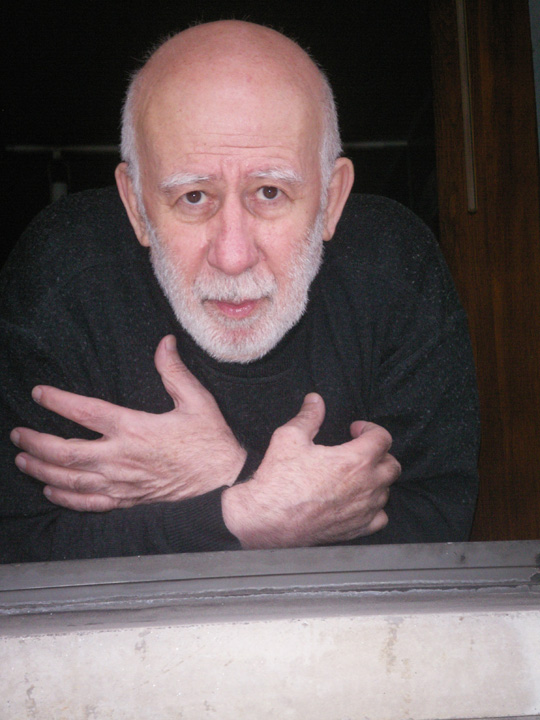
Vagrich Bakhchanyan

Vagrich (Vahrij) Hakobi (Akopovich) Bakhchanyan (Russian: Ва́грич Ако́пович Бахчаня́н; Ukrainian: Ва́грiч Ако́пович Бахчаня́н; Armenian: Վահրիճ Հակոբի Բախչանյան; May 23, 1938, in Kharkiv, Soviet Ukraine – November 12, 2009, in New York City, United States) was a Ukrainian graphic artist and designer of Armenian heritage. He was a Soviet nonconformist and Ukrainian underground artist, and conceptual writer and poet working in the Russian language.

== Biography ==
He was born to an ethnic Armenian family in Kharkiv, Ukraine, where he grew up, studied and began painting. In the mid-1960s he moved to Moscow, where he worked at Literaturnaya Gazeta. In 1974 Bakhchanyan emigrated to United States, and lived in New York City, where he was active in the literary and art scene. There he collaborated with Russian and Soviet émigré writers Sergei Dovlatov, Alexander Genis, and Naum Sagalovsky, among others. He illustrated the last sixty-six journal covers of a leading democratic international Russian language magazine "Vremya i My", published by Viktor Perelman. He died on November 12, 2009, in New York City. According to Vagrich's last will, his ashes were scattered high in the Geghama mountains (Armenia), over a stone covered with ancient petroglyphs.

According to Alexander Genis, Bakhchanyan "possessed a keen sensitivity to the absurdities of the Soviet regime. By developing and experimenting with inventive artistic strategies, Bakhchanyan broadened the range of expressive possibilities for other nonconformist artists. Many of his puns became an intrinsic part of Soviet dissident culture."

== Collections ==
- Museum of Modern Art, New York, New York, United States
- National Centre for Contemporary Art, Moscow, Russia
- Museum of Actual Art ART4U, Moscow, Russia
- Tretiakov Gallery, Moscow, Russia
- Hermitage Museum, St. Petersburg, Russia
- State Russian Museum, St. Petersburg, Russia
- Yerevan Modern Art Museum, Yerevan, Armenia
- Museum of National Arts of Ukraine, Kyiv, Ukraine
- John Paul Getty Research Center and Museum, Los Angeles, United States
- Jane Voorhees Zimmerli Art Museum, Norton and Nancy Dodge collection, Rutgers University, New Brunswick, New Jersey, US
- Bar-Gera Collection, Cologne, Germany
- Paul and Berty Quaedvlieg Collection, private collection, Netherlands
- Stella Art Foundation, Moscow, Russia
- Markin Collection, Moscow, Russia
- Rare Books & Special Collections, Hesburgh Library, University of Notre Dame, South Bend, Indiana, United States

== Books ==
- 1981 — «Автобиография сорокалетнего автора» (Autobiography of a Forty-Year-Old Author)
- 1981 — Visual diary: 1/1/80 — 12/31/80
- 1985 — «Демарш энтузиастов» (Démarche of Enthusiasts, co-authored by Sergei Dovlatov and Naum Sagalovsky)
- 1986 — «Синьяк под глазом: пуантель-авивская поэма» (Signac under the Eye: Pointillaviv Poem)
- 1986 — «Ни дня без строчки (годовой отчет)» (Nulla dies sine linea, Year's End Report)
- 1986 — «Стихи разных лет» (Poems from Various Years)
- 2003 — «Мух уйма: художества». (Eddy of Flies: Artricks, Yekaterinburg: У-Фактория (U-faktoria), 2003. ISBN 5-94799-080-6
- 2006 - «Мух уйма (Художества). (Eddy of Flies: Artricks. Not by bread alone. (Menu-Collage), foreword by A. Genis. Yekaterinburg: У-Фактория (U-faktoria), 2006, 512 pages. ISBN 5-9757-0027-2
- 2005 — «"Вишневый ад" и другие пьесы» (Cherry Hell and other Plays), NLO, Moscow
- 2010 — «Сочинения Вагрича Бахчаняна» (Essays by Vagrich Bakhchanyan), Publ. by G. Titov, Vologda, Russia
- 2011 — «Записные книжки Вагрича Бахчаняна» (From Notebooks of Vagrich Bakhchanyan), NLO, Moscow
