= Lev Rubinstein =

Russian writer and philologist (1947–2024)

- Лев Рубинштейн
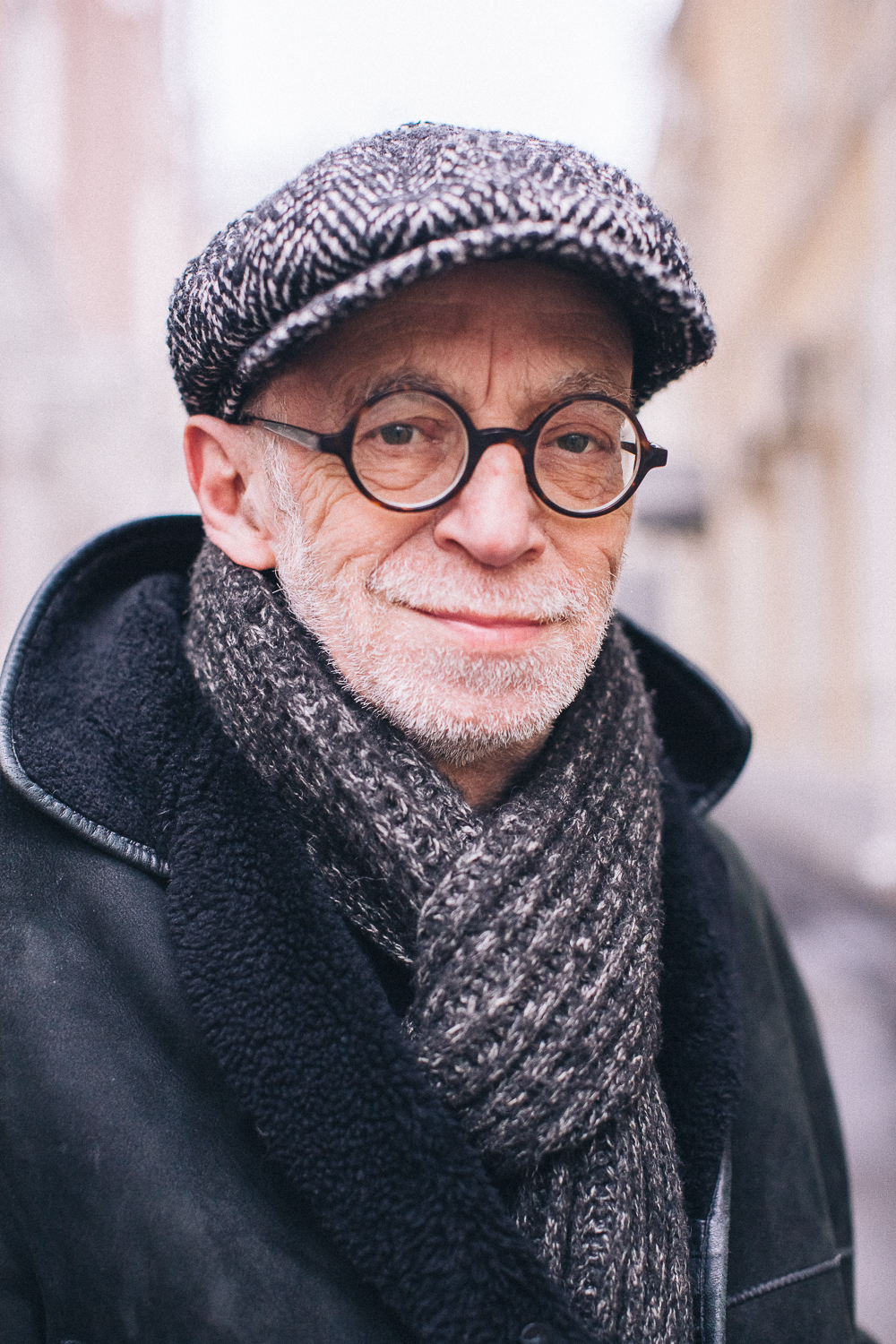
- Rubinstein in 2017
- Born: Lev Semyonovich Rubinstein; 19 February 1947; Moscow, Russian SFSR, Soviet Union
- Died: 14 January 2024 (aged 76); Moscow, Russia
- Education: Moscow Pedagogical Institute for Correspondence Studies
- Occupations: Essayist, journalist, poet, social activist
- Awards: Andrei Bely Prize (1999)

Lev Semyonovich Rubinstein (Russian: Лев Семёнович Рубинштейн; 19 February 1947 – 14 January 2024) was a Russian essayist, journalist, poet, and social activist. He was a founder and member of Moscow Conceptualism.

== Biography ==
Born on 19 February 1947 in Moscow to Jewish parents, Rubinstein studied philology at Moscow Pedagogical Institute for Correspondence Studies (now: Sholokhov Moscow State University for Humanities). After graduating, he worked as a librarian and bibliographer with his alma mater, where he encountered the catalog cards that would inspire his "notecard poems". In the 1970s and 1980s, Rubinstein became a major writer in the underground Soviet literary scene, particularly for his association with Moscow Conceptualism. In his later career, Rubinstein transitioned to journalism and social activism, writing for Itogi and the Weekly Journal. He won the Andrei Bely Prize for scholarship in the humanities in 1999. Rubinstein was married to Irina Golovinskaya and had one daughter, Maria.

Rubinstein was hit by a car in Moscow on 8 January 2024, and died of his injuries six days later at the age of 76. The driver of the car was subsequently convicted to a suspended prison term of one year and eight months and banned from driving for two-and-a-half years.

== Work ==
Rubinstein was known for his "notecard poems", wherein each stanza is represented on a separate notecard. These notecards highlight the text as both an object and a unit of expression. To read the poem, the reader must interact with the text on a physical level. Although each stanza is discrete and numbered, the cards must nonetheless be read in their prescribed order.

Rubinstein's poems incorporate several forms of literary expression. They move between verse and prose, sometimes adopting the form of a play or even containing cues for the audience. Much of the writing itself is a "quasi-quotation", a quotation that appears to be from everyday life, but is instead carefully constructed with a specific style and meter. Rubinstein often borrowed the style of important Russian writers, yet he adapted his own words to this style, hence creating quotations which were not in fact quotations.

Rubinstein was often associated with the Moscow Conceptualists, a Russian artistic movement in which the ideative concept of art supersedes traditional artistic focuses. Rubinstein himself stated that "Moscow conceptualism unites the inner feeling that the world is divided, all the texts are written, the paintings are drawn. The task of the current artist is to rethink, to rename. And to name is more important than to do. To a certain extent, it is a nominative art." Moscow Conceptualism is also a negative response to Russian socialist realism, centering on the "consciousness of the individual who has to live this myth" of socialist realism.

== Bibliography ==
Rubinstein's work has been translated in four English-language books:

- Catalog of Comedic Novelties, translated by Philip Metres and Tatiana Tulchinsky (New York: Ugly Duckling Presse, 2004). ISBN 9780972768443, OL 22604691M
- Compleat Catalog of Comedic Novelties, translated by Philip Metres and Tatiana Tulchinsky (New York: Ugly Duckling Presse, 2014). ISBN 9781937027421, OL 28815850M
- Here I Am: New Russian Writing, translated by Joanne Turnbull (Moscow: GLAS, 2001). ISBN 9785717200585, OL 9045720M
- Thirty-five New Pages, translated by Philip Metres and Tatiana Tulchinsky (New York: Ugly Duckling Presse, 2011).

He also appeared in a number of anthologies. His work has been published in English translation in literary journals such as Asymptote, The Cafe Review, Diode, Drunken Boat, Jacket, The Massachusetts Review, Matter, New England Review, and Poetry International.

== Awards ==
- 1999: Literary Andrei Bely Prize in the nomination Humanitarian Research
- 2012: Literary prize NOS for his book Signs of Attention
