= Russian literature =

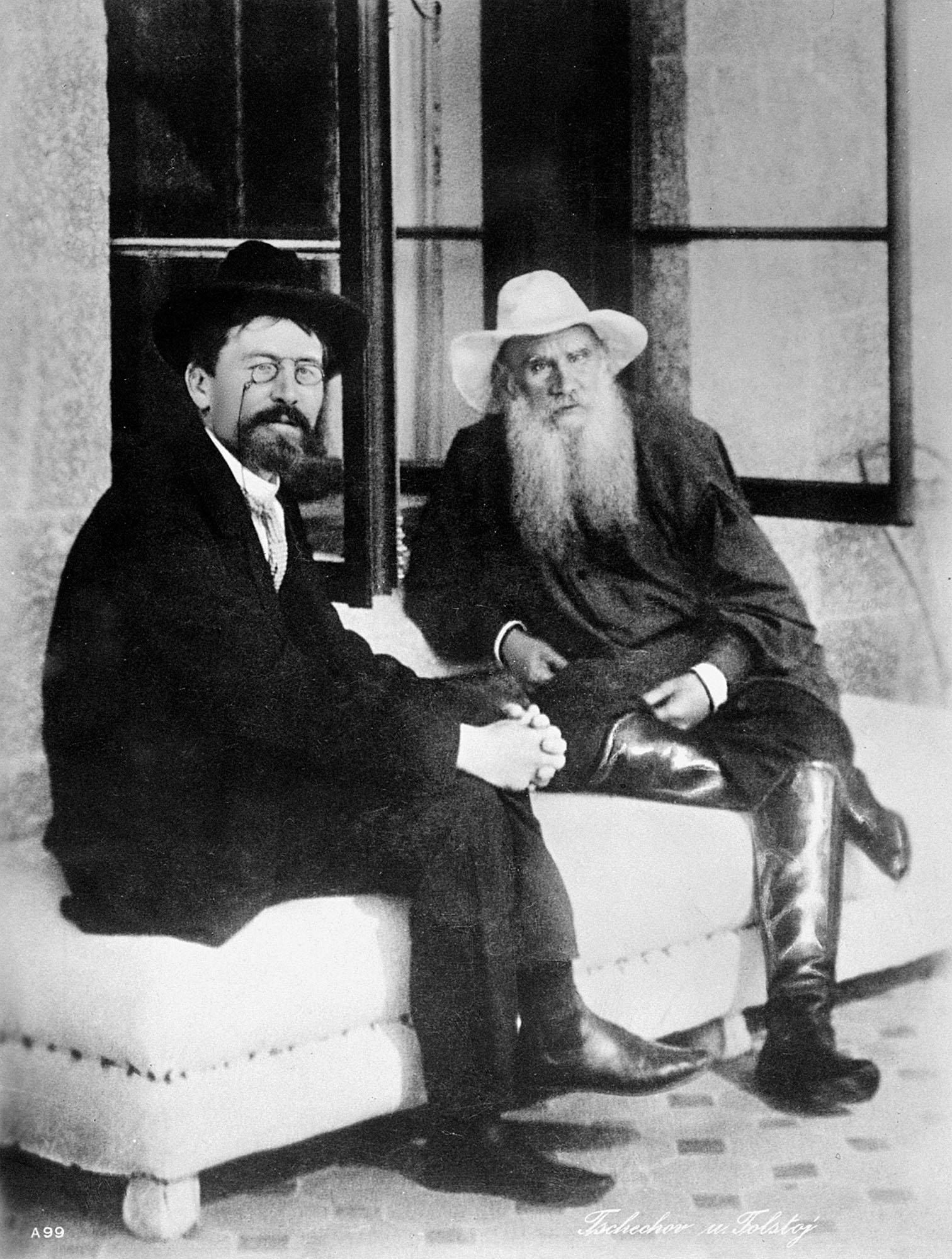
Chekhov and Tolstoy, 1901

Russian literature is the literature of Russia, its émigrés, and Russian-language literature. Major contributors to Russian literature, as well as English for instance, are authors of different ethnic origins, including bilingual writers, such as Kyrgyz novelist Chinghiz Aitmatov and Vasil Bykaŭ, the latter wrote in Belarusian, but translated his works into Russian. At the same time, Russian-language literature does not include works by authors from the Russian Federation who write exclusively or primarily in the native languages of the indigenous non-Russian ethnic groups in Russia, thus the famous Dagestani poet Rasul Gamzatov is omitted.

The roots of Russian written literature can be traced to the Early Middle Ages when Old Church Slavonic was introduced as a liturgical language and became used as a literary language. The native Russian vernacular remained the use within oral literature as well as written for decrees, laws, messages, chronicles, military tales, and so on. By the Age of Enlightenment, literature had grown in importance, and from the early 1830s, Russian literature underwent an astounding "Golden Age" in poetry, prose and drama. The Romantic movement contributed to a flowering of literary talent: poet Vasily Zhukovsky and later his protégé Alexander Pushkin came to the fore. Mikhail Lermontov was one of the most important poets and novelists. Nikolai Gogol and Ivan Turgenev wrote masterful short stories and novels. Fyodor Dostoevsky and Leo Tolstoy became internationally renowned. Other important figures were Ivan Goncharov, Mikhail Saltykov-Shchedrin and Nikolai Leskov. In the second half of the century Anton Chekhov excelled in short stories and became a leading dramatist. The end of the 19th century and the beginning of the 20th century is sometimes called the Silver Age of Russian poetry. The poets most often associated with the "Silver Age" are Konstantin Balmont, Valery Bryusov, Alexander Blok, Anna Akhmatova, Nikolay Gumilyov, Sergei Yesenin, Vladimir Mayakovsky, and Marina Tsvetaeva. This era produced novelists and short-story writers, such as Aleksandr Kuprin, Nobel Prize winner Ivan Bunin, Leonid Andreyev, Fyodor Sologub, Yevgeny Zamyatin, Alexander Belyaev, Andrei Bely and Maxim Gorky.

After the Russian Revolution of 1917, literature split into Soviet and white émigré parts. While the Soviet Union assured universal literacy and a highly developed book printing industry, it also established ideological censorship. In the 1930s Socialist realism became the predominant trend in Russia. Its leading figures were Nikolay Ostrovsky, Alexander Fadeyev and other writers, who laid the foundations of this style. Ostrovsky's novel How the Steel Was Tempered has been among the most popular works of Russian Socrealist literature. Some writers, such as Mikhail Bulgakov, Andrei Platonov and Daniil Kharms were criticized and wrote with little or no hope of being published. Various émigré writers, such as poets Vladislav Khodasevich, Georgy Ivanov and Vyacheslav Ivanov; novelists such as Ivan Shmelyov, Gaito Gazdanov, Vladimir Nabokov and Bunin, continued to write in exile. Some writers dared to oppose Soviet ideology, like Nobel Prize-winning novelist Aleksandr Solzhenitsyn and Varlam Shalamov, who wrote about life in the gulag camps. The Khrushchev Thaw brought some fresh wind to literature and poetry became a mass cultural phenomenon. This "thaw" did not last long; in the 1970s, some of the most prominent authors were banned from publishing and prosecuted for their anti-Soviet sentiments.

The post-Soviet end of the 20th century was a difficult period for Russian literature, with few distinct voices. Among the most discussed authors of this period were novelists Victor Pelevin and Vladimir Sorokin, and the poet Dmitri Prigov. In the 21st century, a new generation of Russian authors appeared, differing greatly from the postmodernist Russian prose of the late 20th century, which led critics to speak about "new realism". Russian authors have significantly contributed to numerous literary genres. Russia has five Nobel Prize in Literature laureates. As of 2011, Russia was the fourth largest book producer in the world in terms of published titles. A popular folk saying claims Russians are "the world's most reading nation". As the American scholar Gary Saul Morson notes, "No country has ever valued literature more than Russia."

== Old oral literature ==
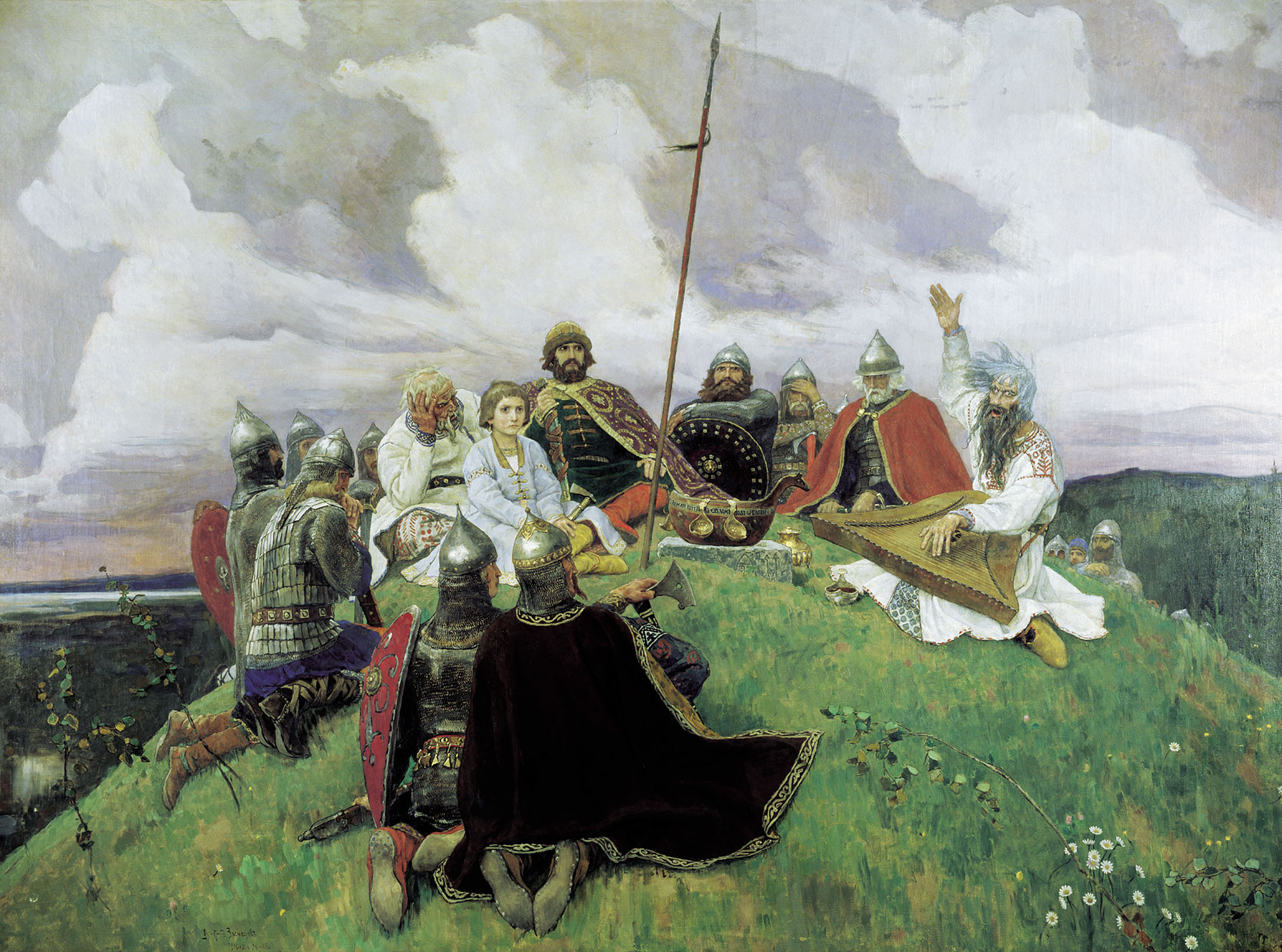
The bard Boyan accompanying on the gusli by Viktor Vasnetsov, 1910

Oral literature, including pagan myths and prayers, ceremonial poetry, zagovory (evocations), charms, byliny (heroic epics), byvalschina and bylichka (memorates), legends, fairy tales, folksongs, and others, in the languages of the East Slavic tribes, and later in the Old Russian vernacular and its dialects, is by definition older than written literature and accompanied the latter throughout its development.

Заслышал Скимен-зверь невзгодушку:
Уж как на небе родился светел месяц,
На земле-то народился могуч богатырь.

— From the bylina called The Birth of a Knight-errant (Russian: Рождение богатыря).

Professional storytelling existed, with bards of druzhiny like Boyan playing the gusli and wandering skomorokhi. For a long time, folk literature was not recorded by scribes during the Kievan and Muscovite periods due to its pagan nature and, therefore, was largely lost. In the Middle Ages, folklore was widespread among all social strata, from peasants to the warriors and the knyaz-boyar aristocracy. With the advent of the written era, oral and written literature, with their own system of genres, coexisted in parallel. They complemented each other and sometimes came into close contact. Early examples of such reflection include the Legend of the Founding of Kiev and the Legend of the brothers Radim and Vyatko, the progenitors of the Radimichs and Vyatichi tribes, respectively, which were incorporated into medieval Russian chronicles after being reworked. A later example is The Tale of Peter and Fevronia of Murom, which draws on local legends and fantastic tales.

== Medieval and early modern era ==
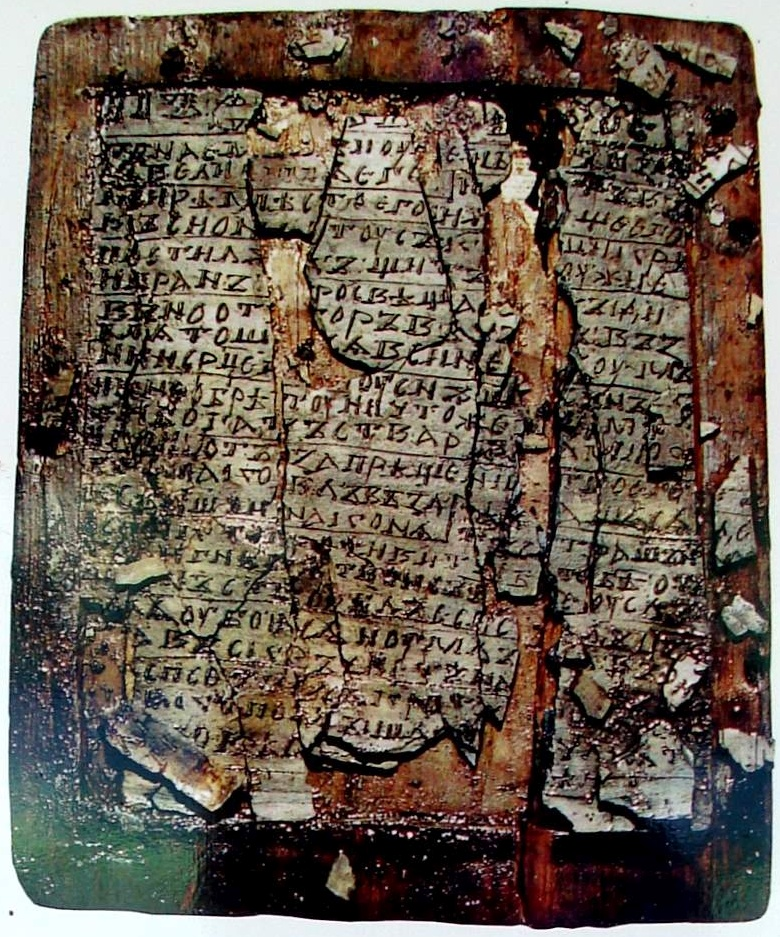
First page of the Novgorod Psalter of c. 1000, the oldest survived Slavic book

Scholars typically use the term Old Russian literature, in addition to the terms medieval Russian literature and early modern Russian literature, or pre-Petrian literature, to refer to Russian written literature until the reforms of Peter the Great, tying literary development to historical periodization. The term is generally used to refer to all forms of literary activity in what is often called Old Russia from the 11th to 17th centuries.

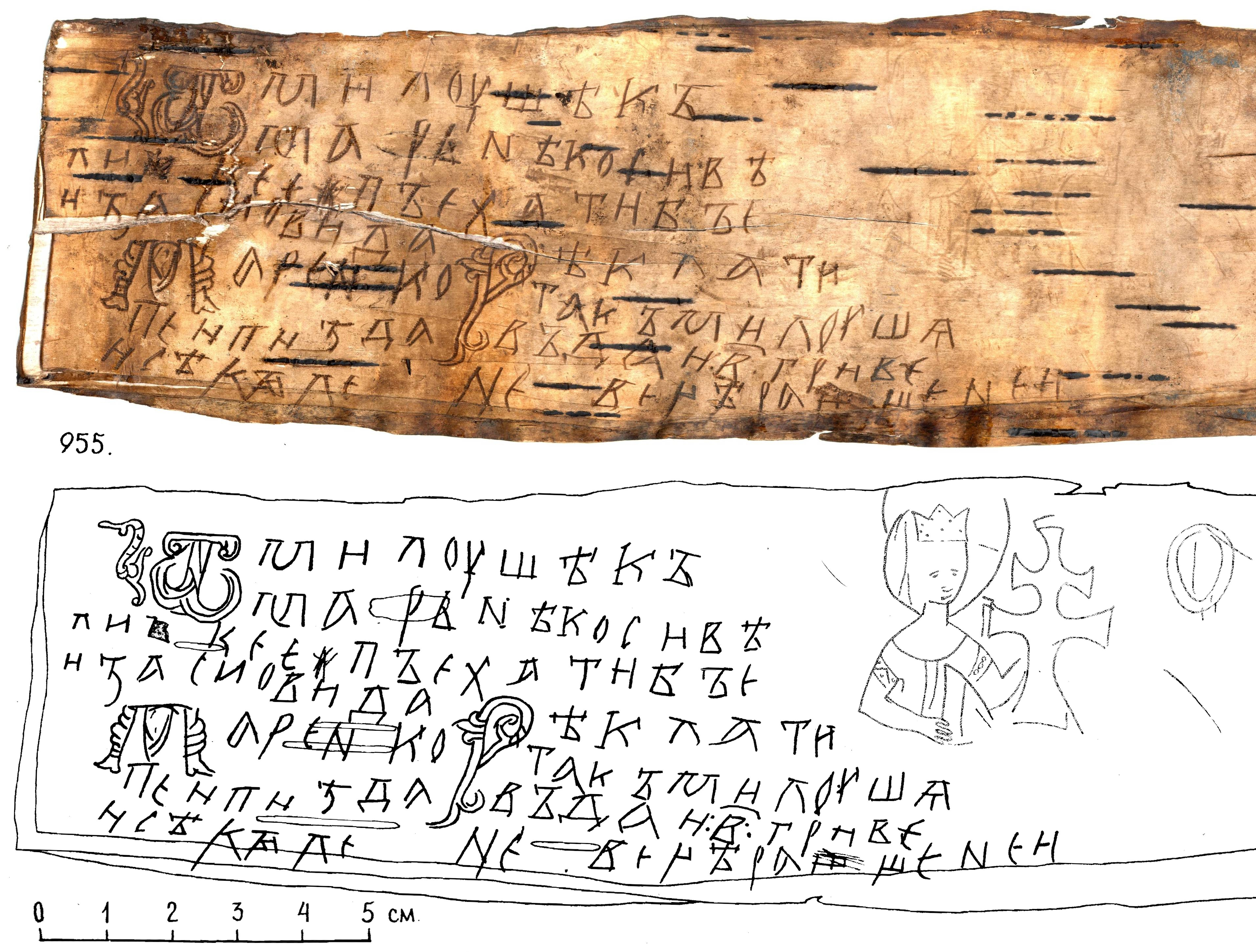
Personal correspondence, the birch bark letter from Matchmaker's Milusha to Marena, 12th century, Veliky Novgorod

Literary works from this period were often written in the Russian recension of Church Slavonic with varying amounts of the Russian or more broadly East Slavic vernacular. At the same time, the native Old Russian vernacular was not only language of oral literature, such as epic poems (byliny) or folksongs, but it was also perfectly legitimate as written for practical purposes, such as decrees, laws (the Russkaya Pravda, the 11th–12th century, and other codes), letters (for example, the unique pre-paper birch bark manuscripts of the 11th–15th centuries in the Old Novgorod dialect), ambassadorial messages, "in chronicles or military tales whose language is fundamentally the Russian vernacular."

Old Russian "bookish" literature traces its beginnings to the introduction of Old Church Slavonic in Kievan Rus' as a liturgical language in the late 10th century following Christianization. The East Slavs soon developed their own literature, and the oldest dated manuscript of Early Russian as well all-Slavic literature that has survived to this day is the Novgorod Codex or Novgorod Psalter written c. 1000, unearthed in 2000 at Veliky Novgorod, containing four wooden tablet pages filled with wax. Another earliest Russian book is the Ostromir Gospels written in 1056–1057, which belongs to the set of liturgical texts that were translated from other languages.

The discord of the princes ruined them against the Pagans. For, brother spake to brother;—"This is mine, and that is also mine." And the princes began to pronounce of a paltry thing, 'this is great'; and themselves amongst them to forge feuds; and the heathens from all sides advanced with victories against the Russian land.

— The Tale of Igor's Campaign, 2.1 (c. 1185), translated by Leonard A. Magnus.

The main type of Old Russian historical literature were chronicles, most of them anonymous. The oldest one is the Primary Chronicle or Tale of Nestor the Chronicler (c. 1115). Nestor was an influential East Slavic monk. At age 17 he entered the Kyivan Cave Monastery, and then in the 1080's he became known for writing “Account about the Life and Martyrdom of the Blessed Passion Bearers Boris and Gleb”.The oldest surviving manuscripts include the Laurentian Codex of 1377 and the Hypatian Codex dating to the 1420s. Anonymous works include The Tale of Igor's Campaign (a 12th century prose poem masterpiece) and Praying of Daniel the Immured. Hagiographies (Russian: жития святых, romanized: zhitiya svyatykh, lit. 'lives of the saints') formed a popular literary genre in Old Russian literature. The first notable hagiographer was Nestor the Chronicler, who wrote about the lives of Boris and Gleb, the first saints of Kievan Rus', and the abbot Theodosius. The Life of Alexander Nevsky is a well-known example, which combines political realism and hagiographical ideals, and concentrates on the key events of Alexander Nevsky's political career. The earliest account of a pilgrimage is The Pilgrimage of the Abbot Daniel, which records the journey of Daniel the Traveller to the Holy Land. Complex epic works such as The Tale of the Destruction of Ryazan recall the havoc caused by the Mongol invasions. Other notable Russian literary works include Zadonschina, Physiologist, Synopsis and A Journey Beyond the Three Seas. Medieval Russian literature had an overwhelmingly religious character and used an adapted form of the Church Slavonic language with many South Slavic elements.

In the 16th century, reflecting the political centralization and unification of the country under the tsar, chronicles were updated and codified, the Russian Orthodox Church began issuing its decrees in the Stoglav, and a large compilation called the Great Menaion Reader collected both the more modern polemical texts and the hagiographical and patristic legacy of Old Russia. The Book of Royal Degrees codified the cult of the tsar, the Domostroy laid down the rules for family life, and other texts such as the History of Kazan were used to justify the actions of the tsar. The Tale of Peter and Fevronia were among the original tales of this period, and Russian tsar Ivan IV wrote some of most original works of 16th-century Russian literature. The Time of Troubles marked a turning point in Old Russian literature as both the church and state lost control over the written word, which are reflected in the texts of writers such as Avraamy Palitsyn who developed a literary technique for representing complex characters.

In the second half of the 17th century, the literature of Baroque took shape, primarily due to the initiative of tsar Alexis of Russia, who wanted to open a court theatre in 1672. Its director and playwright was Johann Gottfried Gregorii, a German-Russian pastor, who wrote, in particular, the 10-hour play The Action of Artaxerxes. The poetry and dramaturgy of Symeon of Polotsk and Demetrius of Rostov contributed to the development of the Russian version of the Baroque.

In the 17th century, when bookmen from the Kiev Academy arrived in Moscow, they brought with them a culture heavily influenced by the educational system of the Polish Jesuits. Mentioned Symeon of Polotsk created a new style which fused elements of ancient and contemporary Western European literature with traditional Russian rhetoric and the imperial ideology, which marked a key step in the Westernization of Russian literature. Syllabic poetry was also brought to Russia, and the work of Simeon of Polotsk was continued by Sylvester Medvedev and Karion Istomin.

"Will these sufferings go on a long time, Archpriest?" And I said, "Markovna, right up to our very death." And so she sighed and answered, "Good enough, Petrovič, then let's be getting on."

— Avvakum, The Life written by Himself (1672), translated by Kenneth N. Brostrom

The Life of the Archpriest Avvakum—a novelty autobiography written by the one of the leaders of the 17th-century religious dissident group Old Believers Avvakum—is a piece of pre-Petrian literature, which blends high Old Church Slavonic with low Russian vernacular and profanity.

== Age of Enlightenment, 18th century ==
After taking the throne at the end of the 17th century, Peter the Great's influence on the Russian culture would extend far into the 18th century. Peter's reign during the beginning of the 18th century initiated a series of modernizing changes in Russian literature. The reforms he implemented encouraged Russian artists and scientists to make innovations in their crafts and fields with the intention of creating an economy and culture comparable. Peter's example set a precedent for the remainder of the 18th century as Russian writers began to form clear ideas about the proper use and progression of the Russian language. Through their debates regarding versification of the Russian language and tone of Russian literature, the writers in the first half of the 18th century were able to lay foundation for the more poignant, topical work of the late 18th century.

Satirist Antiokh Dmitrievich Kantemir, 1708–1744, was one of the earliest Russian writers not only to praise the ideals of Peter I's reforms but the ideals of the growing Enlightenment movement in Europe. Kantemir's works regularly expressed his admiration for Peter, most notably in his epic dedicated to the emperor entitled Petrida. More often, however, Kantemir indirectly praised Peter's influence through his satiric criticism of Russia's "superficiality and obscurantism", which he saw as manifestations of the backwardness Peter attempted to correct through his reforms. Kantemir honored this tradition of reform not only through his support for Peter, but by initiating a decade-long debate on the proper syllabic versification using the Russian language.

Vasily Kirillovich Trediakovsky, a poet, playwright, essayist, translator and contemporary to Antiokh Kantemir, also found himself deeply entrenched in Enlightenment conventions in his work with the Russian Academy of Sciences and his groundbreaking translations of French and classical works to the Russian language. A turning point in the course of Russian literature, his translation of Paul Tallemant's work Voyage to the Isle of Love, was the first to use the Russian vernacular as opposed the formal and outdated Church-Slavonic. This introduction set a precedent for secular works to be composed in the vernacular, while sacred texts would remain in Church-Slavonic. However, his work was often incredibly theoretical and scholarly, focused on promoting the versification of the language with which he spoke.

While Trediakovsky's approach to writing is often described as highly erudite, the young writer and scholarly rival to Trediakovsky, Alexander Petrovich Sumarokov, 1717–1777, was dedicated to the styles of French classicism. Sumarokov's interest in the form of the 17th-century French literature mirrored his devotion to the westernizing spirit of Peter the Great's age. Although he often disagreed with Trediakovsky, Sumarokov also advocated the use of simple, natural language in order to diversify the audience and make more efficient use of the Russian language. Like his colleagues and counterparts, Sumarokov extolled the legacy of Peter I, writing in his manifesto Epistle on Poetry, "The great Peter hurls his thunder from the Baltic shores, the Russian sword glitters in all corners of the universe". Peter the Great's policies of westernization and displays of military prowess naturally attracted Sumarokov and his contemporaries.

Mikhail Vasilyevich Lomonosov, in particular, expressed his gratitude for and dedication to Peter's legacy in his unfinished Peter the Great, Lomonosov's works often focused on themes of the awe-inspiring, grandeur nature, and was therefore drawn to Peter because of the magnitude of his military, architectural and cultural feats. In contrast to Sumarokov's devotion to simplicity, Lomonosov favored a belief in a hierarchy of literary styles divided into high, middle and low. This style facilitated Lomonosov's grandiose, high minded writing and use of both vernacular and Church-Slavonic.

The influence of Peter I and debates over the function and form of literature as it related to the Russian language in the first half of the 18th century set a stylistic precedent for the writers during the reign of Catherine the Great in the second half of the century. However, the themes and scopes of the works these writers produced were often more poignant, political and controversial. Ippolit Bogdanovich's narrative poem Dushenka (1778) is rare sample of the Rococo style, erotic light poetry in Russia. Alexander Nikolayevich Radishchev, for example, shocked the Russian public with his depictions of the socio-economic condition of the serfs. Empress Catherine II condemned this portrayal, forcing Radishchev into exile in Siberia.

Others, however, picked topics less offensive to the autocrat. the historian and writer Nikolay Karamzin, 1766–1826, the key figure of literary sentimentalism in Russia, for example, is known for his advocacy of Russian writers adopting traits in the poetry and prose like a heightened sense of emotion and physical vanity, considered to be feminine at the time as well as supporting the cause of female Russian writers. Karamzin's call for male writers to write with femininity was not in accordance with the Enlightenment ideals of reason and theory, considered masculine attributes. His works were thus not universally well received; however, they did reflect in some areas of society a growing respect for, or at least ambivalence toward, a female ruler in Catherine the Great. This concept heralded an era of regarding female characteristics in writing as an abstract concept linked with attributes of frivolity, vanity and pathos.

Some writers, on the other hand, were more direct in their praise for Catherine II. Gavrila Romanovich Derzhavin, famous for his odes, often dedicated his poems to Empress Catherine II. In contrast to most of his contemporaries, Derzhavin was highly devoted to his state; he served in the military, before rising to various roles in Catherine II's government, including secretary to the Empress and Minister of Justice. Unlike those who took after the grand style of Mikhail Lomonosov and Alexander Sumarokov, Derzhavin was concerned with the minute details of his subjects.

Denis Fonvizin, an author primarily of comedy, approached the subject of the Russian nobility with an angle of critique. Fonvizin felt the nobility should be held to the standards they were under the reign of Peter the Great, during which the quality of devotion to the state was rewarded. His works criticized the current system for rewarding the nobility without holding them responsible for the duties they once performed. Using satire and comedy, Fonvizin supported a system of nobility in which the elite were rewarded based upon personal merit rather than the hierarchal favoritism that was rampant during Catherine the Great's reign.

== Golden Age ==
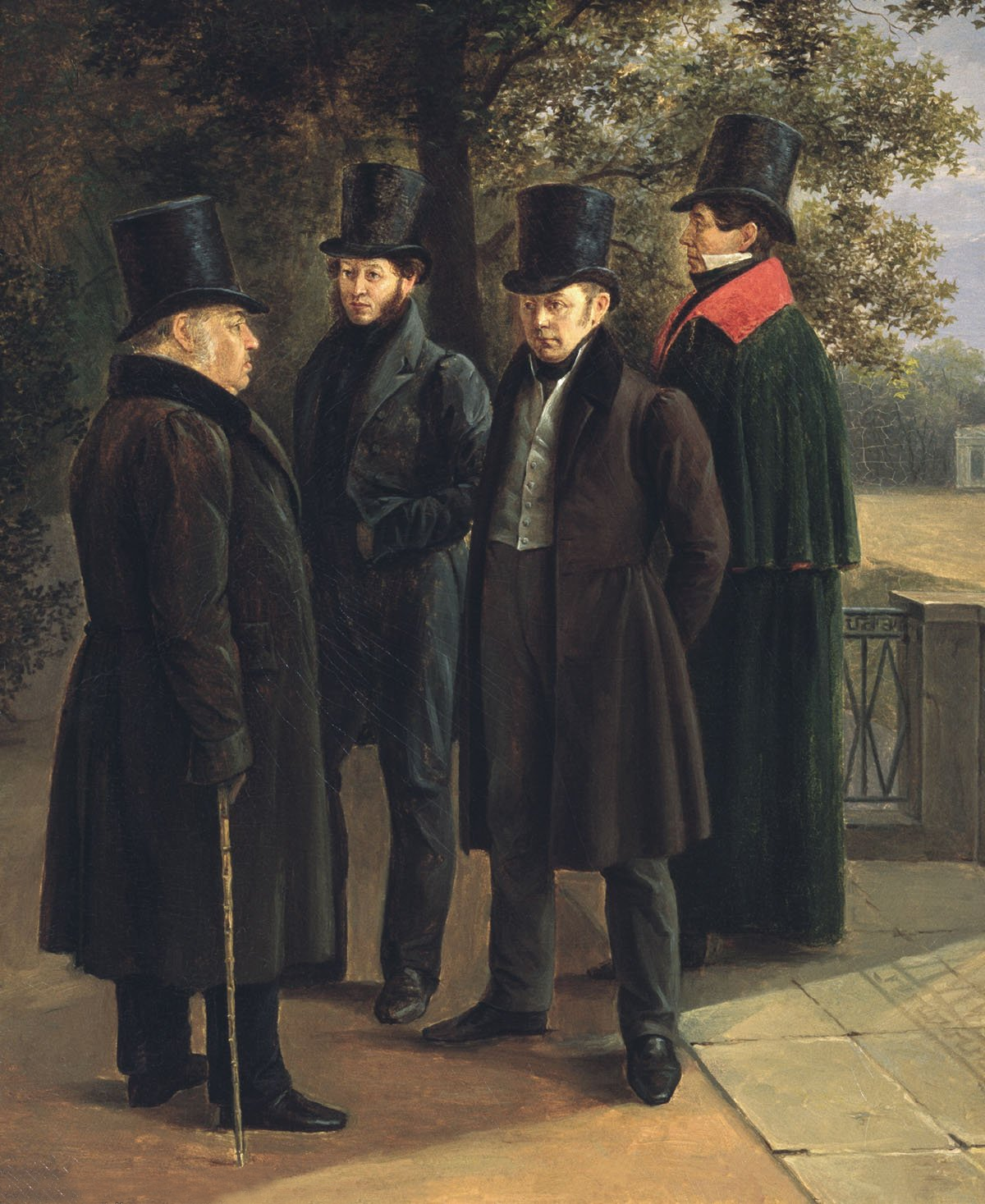
Krylov, Pushkin, Zhukovsky, and Gnedich in the Summer Garden by Grigory Chernetsov (1832)

I lay, and heard the voice of God:
"Arise, oh prophet, watch and hearken,
And with my Will thy soul engird,
Through lands that dim and seas that darken,
Burn thou men's hearts with this, my Word."

— Alexander Pushkin, The Prophet (1826), translated by
Babette Deutsch and Avrahm Yarmolinsky

The 19th century is traditionally referred to as the "Golden Era" of Russian literature. The period of Romantic literature saw the flowering of poetic talent, in particular; the names of Vasily Zhukovsky and his protégé Alexander Pushkin came to the fore. Pushkin is credited with crystallizing the literary Russian language and introducing a new level of artistry to Russian literature. His best-known work is a pre-realistic novel in verse, Eugene Onegin (1833). Other poets important to the movement include Konstantin Batyushkov, Pyotr Vyazemsky, Yevgeny Baratynsky, Fyodor Tyutchev and Dmitry Venevitinov, along with the novelists Antony Pogorelsky, Alexander Bestuzhev and "Russian Hoffmann" Vladimir Odoyevsky. Tyutchev is best known for the following verse:

Who would grasp Russia with the mind?
For her no yardstick was created:
Her soul is of a special kind,
By faith alone appreciated.

— Fyodor Tyutchev, Who would grasp Russia with the mind? (1866), translated by John Dewey

An entire new generation of Romantic poets and novelists followed in Pushkin's steps. Mikhail Lermontov wrote the narrative poem Demon in 1829–39, which chronicled the love of a Byronic Demon for a mortal woman, as well as A Hero of Our Time (1841), which is often considered to be the first Russian psychological novel. Aleksey K. Tolstoy and Afanasy Fet were also significant.

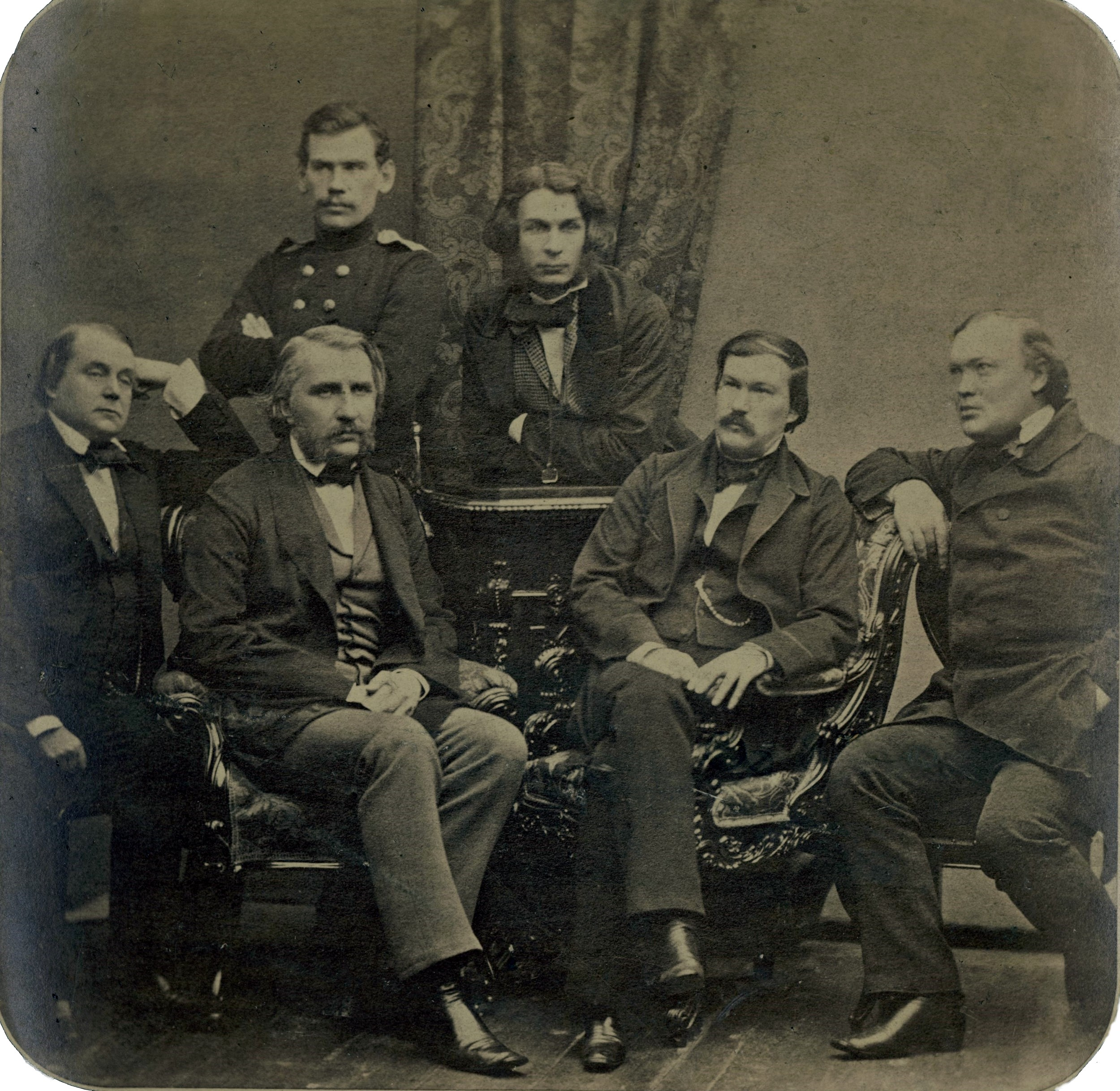
The group picture of Russian writers, the literary magazine Sovremennik editorial board members. Ivan Goncharov, Ivan Turgenev, Leo Tolstoy, Dmitry Grigorovich, Alexander Druzhinin, and Aleksandr Ostrovsky, 1856

As Romanticism came to command the stage, the Age of Realism began to flourish as well. The first great Russian rich language novel was Dead Souls (1842) by Nikolai Gogol. The realistic natural school of fiction is said to have begun with the works of Ivan Goncharov, mainly remembered for his novel Oblomov (1859), as well as Ivan Turgenev. Fyodor Dostoyevsky and Leo Tolstoy soon became internationally renowned, to the point that scholars, such as F. R. Leavis, have frequently described them as among the greatest novelists of all time. Tolstoy's Christian anarchism can be seen in the following quote:

Plants, birds, insects and children were equally joyful. Only men—grown-up men—continued cheating and tormenting themselves and each other. People saw nothing holy in this spring morning, in this beauty of God's world—a gift to all living creatures—inclining to peace, good-will and love, but worshiped their own inventions for imposing their will on each other.

— Leo Tolstoy, The Resurrection, 1.1 (1899), translated by William E. Smith

Mikhail Saltykov-Shchedrin is known for his satirical chronicle The History of a Town (1870) and the family saga The Golovlyov Family (1880), which are considered his masterpieces. Nikolai Leskov is best remembered for his shorter fiction and for his (together with Pavel Melnikov) unique skaz techniques, namely oral form of narrative stylization. Late in the century Anton Chekhov emerged as a master of the short story as well as a leading international dramatist.

Other important 19th-century developments included Sergey Aksakov's semi-autobiographical writings; the father of Russian social realism and left-wing poetry school, known for the sharp epic poem Who Can Be Happy and Free in Russia? Nikolay Nekrasov; the fabulist Ivan Krylov; the precursor to Naturalism Aleksey Pisemsky; non-fiction writers such as the critic Vissarion Belinsky and the political reformer Alexander Herzen; playwrights such as Aleksandr Griboyedov, Aleksandr Ostrovsky, Alexander Sukhovo-Kobylin and the satirist Kozma Prutkov (a collective pen name).

== Silver Age ==
Night, street and streetlight, drug store,
The purposeless, half-dim, drab light.
For all the use live on a quarter century —
Nothing will change. There's no way out.

You'll die — and start all over, live twice,
Everything repeats itself, just as it was:
Night, the canal's rippled icy surface,
The drug store, the street, and streetlight.

— Alexander Blok, Night, street and streetlight, drug store... (1912), translated by Alex Cigale

The 1890s and the beginning of the 20th century ranks as the Silver Age of Russian poetry. Well-known poets of the period include: Alexander Blok, Sergei Yesenin, Valery Bryusov, Konstantin Balmont, Mikhail Kuzmin, Igor Severyanin, Sasha Chorny, Nikolay Gumilyov, Maximilian Voloshin, Innokenty Annensky, Zinaida Gippius. The poets most often associated with the "Silver Age" are Anna Akhmatova, Marina Tsvetaeva, Osip Mandelstam, and Boris Pasternak.

The Russian symbolism was the first Silver Age development in the 1890s. It arose enough separately from West European symbolism, emphasizing mysticism of Sophiology and defamiliarization. Its most significant figures included philosopher and poet Vladimir Solovyov (1853–1900), poets and writers Valery Bryusov (1873–1924), Fyodor Sologub (1863–1927), Vyacheslav Ivanov (1866–1949), Konstantin Balmont (1867–1942), and figures of the new wave generation Alexander Blok (1880–1921) with Andrei Bely (1880–1934).

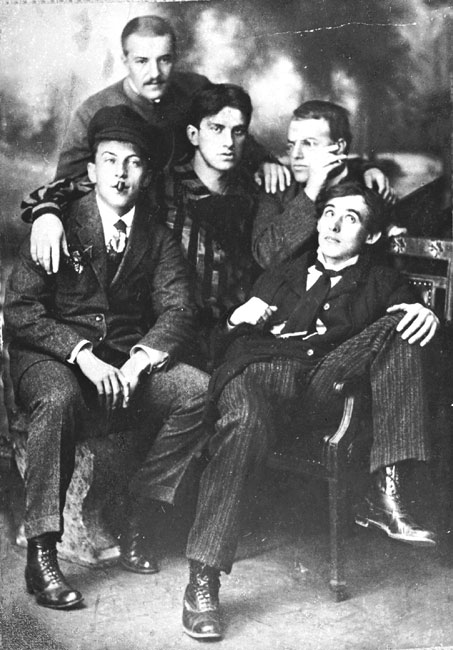
Group photograph of some Russian Futurists, published in their manifesto A Slap in the Face of Public Taste. Left to right: Aleksei Kruchyonykh, Vladimir Burliuk, Vladimir Mayakovsky, David Burliuk, and Benedikt Livshits.

New peasant poets was the conditional collective name of a group of peasant origin and country poetry trend (Nikolai Klyuev, Pyotr Oreshin, Alexander Shiryaevets, Sergei Klychkov, Sergei Yesenin). While the Silver Age is considered to be the development of the 19th-century Russian Golden Age literature tradition, some modernist and avant-garde poets tried to overturn it. Most prominent their movements: the Cubo-Futurism with practice of zaum, the experimental visual and sound poetry (David Burliuk, Velimir Khlebnikov, Aleksei Kruchenykh, Nikolai Aseyev, Vladimir Mayakovsky); the Ego-Futurism based on a personality cult (Igor Severyanin and Vasilisk Gnedov); and the Acmeist poetry, a Russian modernist school, which emerged ca. 1911 and to symbols preferred direct expression through exact images (Anna Akhmatova, Nikolay Gumilev, Georgiy Ivanov, Mikhail Kuzmin, Osip Mandelstam).

Though the Silver Age is famous mostly for its poetry, it produced some first-rate novelists and short-story writers, such as naturalist Aleksandr Kuprin, realists Nobel Prize winner Ivan Bunin and Vikenty Veresaev, pioneer of Russian expressionism Leonid Andreyev, symbolists Fedor Sologub, Aleksey Remizov, Dmitry Merezhkovsky, Andrei Bely, Alexander Belyaev, and Yevgeny Zamyatin, though most of them wrote poetry as well as prose.

In 1915/16, the school of Russian Formalism, wary of the futurists and highly influential for the global theory of literary criticism and poetics, appeared; its programmatic article The Resurrection of the Word by the scholar and writer Viktor Shklovsky (1893–1984) was published in 1914, and the peak of activity occurred in the post-revolutionary 1920s. An integral part of the literature of the Silver Age is Russian philosophy, which reached its peak at this time (see works of Nikolai Berdyaev, Pavel Florensky, Semyon Frank, Nikolay Lossky, Vasily Rozanov, and others).

== Soviet era ==
=== Early post-Revolutionary era ===
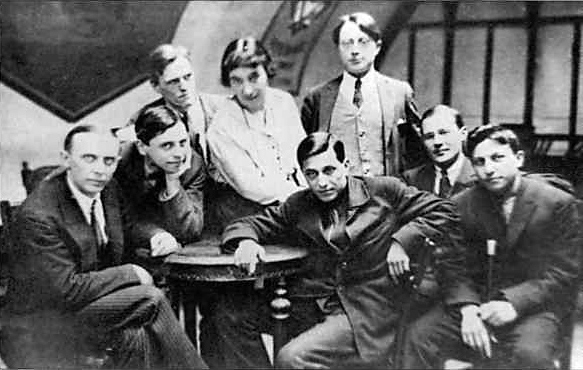
The Serapion Brothers (use a cursor to see who is who)

Tramp squares with rebellious treading!
Up heads! As proud peaks be seen!
In the second flood we are spreading
Every city on earth will be clean.'

— Vladimir Mayakovsky, Our March (1917), translation

The first years of the Soviet regime after the October Revolution of 1917, featured a proliferation of Russian avant-garde literary groups, and proletarian literature receive official support. The Imaginists were post-Revolution poetic movement, similar to English-language Imagists, that created poetry based on sequences of arresting and uncommon images. The major figures include Sergei Yesenin, Anatoly Marienhof, and Rurik Ivnev. Another important movement was the Oberiu (1927–1930s), which included the most famous Russian absurdist Daniil Kharms (1905–1942), Konstantin Vaginov (1899–1934), Alexander Vvedensky (1904–1941) and Nikolay Zabolotsky (1903–1958).

Other famous authors experimenting with language included the novelists Boris Pilnyak (1894–1938), Yuri Olesha (1899–1960), Andrei Platonov (1899–1951) and Artyom Vesyoly (1899–1938), the short-story writers Isaak Babel (1894–1940) and Mikhail Zoshchenko (1894–1958). The OPOJAZ group of literary critics, a part of Russian formalism school, was founded in 1916 in close connection with Russian Futurism. Two of its members also produced influential literary works, namely Viktor Shklovsky, whose numerous books (A Sentimental Journey and Zoo, or Letters Not About Love, both 1923) defy genre in that they present a novel mix of narration, autobiography, and aesthetic as well as social commentary, and Yury Tynyanov (1893–1943), who used his knowledge of Russia's literary history to produce a set of historical novels mainly set in the Pushkin era (e.g., Lieutenant Kijé, Pushkin in three parts, 1935–43, and others).

Following the establishment of Bolshevik rule, Vladimir Mayakovsky worked on interpreting the facts of the new reality. His works, such as "Ode to the Revolution" and "Left March" (both 1918), brought innovations to poetry. In "Left March", Mayakovsky calls for a struggle against the enemies of the Russian Revolution. The poem 150 000 000 (1921) discusses the leading role played by the masses in the revolution. In the poem Vladimir Ilyich Lenin (1924), Mayakovsky looks at the life and work at the leader of Russia's revolution and depicts them against a broad historical background. In the poem All Right! (1927), Mayakovsky writes about socialist society as the "springtime of humanity". Mayakovsky was instrumental in producing a new type of poetry in which politics played a major part. One of the most popular Soviet poets during the 1920s was Nikolai Tikhonov (1896–1979), a future important figure of Stalinist era, well-known for his Ballad About Nails, as follows:

Could nails from such people be fashioned, you’d see
That no tougher nails in the world would there be.

— Nikolai Tikhonov, Ballad of the Nails (1919), translated by Peter Tempest

=== Émigré writers ===
I am an American writer, born in Russia, educated in England, where I studied French literature before moving to Germany for fifteen years. ... My head speaks English, my heart speaks Russian, and my ear speaks French.

— Vladimir Nabokov, from the interview

Usually, Russian émigré literature is understood as the works of the white émigré, namely the first post-Revolutionary wave, although in the broad sense of the word, it also includes Soviet dissidents of the late years through the 1980s. Meanwhile, émigré writers, such as poets Georgy Ivanov, Vyacheslav Ivanov, Vladislav Khodasevich, surrealist Boris Poplavsky (1903–1935), and members of the 1920s–50s Paris Note (French: Note parisienne) Russian poetry movement (Georgy Adamovich, Igor Chinnov, George Ivask, Anatoly Shteiger, Lidia Tcherminskaia); novelists such as M. Ageyev, Mark Aldanov, Gaito Gazdanov, Pyotr Krasnov, Aleksandr Kuprin, Dmitry Merezhkovsky, Aleksey Remizov, Ivan Shmelyov, George Grebenstchikoff, Yevgeny Zamyatin, Vladimir Nabokov, and English-speaking Ayn Rand; and short-story Nobel Prize-winning writer and poet Ivan Bunin, continued to write in exile.

During his emigration, Bunin wrote his most significant works, such as his only autobiographical novel The Life of Arseniev (1927–1939) and short story cycle Dark Avenues (1937–1944). An example of long prose form is Grebenstchikoff's epic novel The Churaevs in six volumes (1922–1937) in which he described life of the Siberians. M. Ageyev is known for his Novel with Cocaine (1934). While the realists Bunin, Shmelyov and Grebenstchikoff wrote about the pre-revolutionary Russia, life of the émigrés was depicted in modernist Nabokov's Mary (1926) and The Gift (1938), Gazdanov's An Evening with Claire (1929) and The Specter of Alexander Wolf (1948) and Georgy Ivanov's novel Disintegration of the Atom (1938).

=== Stalinist era ===
In the 1930s, Socialist realism became the predominant official trend in the Soviet Union. Writers like those of the Serapion Brothers group (1921–), who insisted on the right of an author to write independently of political ideology, were forced by authorities to reject their views and accept socialist realist principles. Some 1930s writers, such as Osip Mandelstam, Daniil Kharms, leader of Oberiu, Leonid Dobychin, Mikhail Bulgakov, author of The White Guard (1923) and The Master and Margarita (1928–1940), and Andrei Platonov, author of novels Chevengur (1928) and The Foundation Pit (1930) were attacked by the official critics as "formalists," "naturalists" and ideological enemies and wrote with little or no hope of being published. Such remarkable writers as Isaac Babel, Boris Pilnyak, Nikolai Klyuev, Sergey Klychkov, Pyotr Oreshin and Artyom Vesyoly, who continued to publish their works but could not get used to the socrealist principles by the end of the 1930s, were executed on fabricated charges, and Osip Mandelstam, Daniil Kharms and Alexander Vvedensky died in prison.

The return from emigration such famous authors as Aleksey Tolstoy, Maxim Gorky, and Ilya Ehrenburg was a major propaganda victory for the Soviets. After his return to Russia Maxim Gorky was proclaimed by the Soviet authorities as "the founder of Socialist Realism". His novel Mother (1906), which Gorky himself considered one of his biggest failures, inspired proletarian writers to found the socrealist movement. Gorky defined socialist realism as the "realism of people who are rebuilding the world" and pointed out that it looks at the past "from the heights of the future's goals", although he defined it not as a strict style (which is studied in Andrei Sinyavsky's essay On Socialist Realism), but as a label for the "union of writers of styles", who write for one purpose, to help in the development of the new man in socialist society. Gorky became the initiator of creating the Writer's Union, a state organization, intended to unite the socrealist writers. Despite the official reputation, Gorky's post-revolutionary works, such as the novel The Life of Klim Samgin (1925–1936) can't be defined as socrealist, but modernist.

Andrei Bely (1880–1934), author of Petersburg (1913/1922), a well-known modernist writer, also was a member of Writer's Union and tried to become a "true" socrealist by writing a series of articles and making ideological revisions to his memoirs, and he also planned to begin a study of Socialist realism; however, he continued writing with his unique techniques. Although he was actively published during his lifetime, his major works would not be reissued until the end of the 1970s. Valentin Kataev, who began publishing before the Revolution, is the author of the first Soviet "industrial novel" Time, Forward! (1932) and the classic 1946 short story Our Father. Mikhail Sholokhov (1905–1984) was one of the most significant figures in the official Soviet literature. His main socrealist work is Virgin Soil Upturned (1935), a novel in which Sholokhov glorifies the collectivization. However, his unique for period best-known and the most significant literary achievement is Quiet Flows the Don (1928–40), an epic novel which realistically depicts the life of Don Cossacks during the First World War, the Russian Revolution, and Russian Civil War.

Nikolai Ostrovsky's novel How the Steel Was Tempered (1932–1934) has been among the most popular and standard works of literary socrealism, with tens of millions of copies printed in many languages around the world. In China, various versions of the book have sold more than 10 million copies. In Russia more than 35 million copies of the book are in circulation. The book is a fictionalized autobiography of Ostrovsky's life: he had a difficult working-class childhood, became a Komsomol member in July 1919 and volunteered to join the Red Army. The novel's protagonist, Pavel Korchagin, represented the "young hero" of Russian literature: he is dedicated to his political causes, which help him to overcome his tragedies. Alexander Fadeyev (1901–1956) was also a well-known Socialist realism writer, the chairman of the official Writer's Union during Stalinist era. His novel The Rout (1927) deals with the partisan struggle in Russia's Far East during the Russian Revolution and Civil War of 1917–1922. Fadeyev described the theme of this novel as one of a revolution significantly transforming the masses.

In the 1930s, Konstantin Paustovsky (1892–1968), an influenced by neo-Romantic works of Alexander Grin master of landscape prose, a singer of the Meshchera Lowlands, and already in the post-Stalin years a multiple nominee for the Nobel Prize in Literature, joined the ranks of leading Soviet writers.fantastic. Novelist and playwright Leonid Leonov, despite the fact that he was considered by authorities to be one of the pillars of socialist realism, during the Stalin years, created a forbidden novella about emigrants Eugenua Ivanovna (1938), a play about the Chekist purges, The Snowstorm (1940), briefly permitted and then also forbidden, and a novel, The Russian Forest (1953), where ecological issues were perhaps touched upon for the first time in Soviet literature. Over the course of forty years (1940–1994), he wrote a huge philosophical and mystical novel, "The Pyramid", which was finished and published in the year of the author's death.

Wait for me and I'll come back,
Escaping every fate!
"Just got lucky!" they will say,
Those that didn't wait.
They will never understand
How, amidst the strife,
By your waiting for me, dear,
You had saved my life!

— Konstantin Simonov, Wait for Me! (1941), translated by Mike Munford

The cult figures of the literature of the Second World War were the war poets Konstantin Simonov, arguably most famous for his 1941 poem Wait for Me, and Aleksandr Tvardovsky, author of the long poem "Vasily Terkin" (1941–45), chief editor of the literary magazine Novy Mir. Poet Yulia Drunina known for writing about women at war. Boris Polevoy is the author of the Story About a True Man (1946), based on the life of World War II fighter pilot Aleksey Maresyev, which was an immensely popular.

=== Late Soviet era ===
So what is beauty? And why does the human race
Keep up its worship, whether valid or misguided?
Is it a vessel holding empty space,
Or is it fire shimmering inside it?

— Nikolay Zabolotsky, A Plain Girl (1955), translated by Alyona Mokraya

After the end of World War II Nobel Prize-winning Boris Pasternak (1890–1960) wrote a novel Doctor Zhivago (1945–1955). Publication of the novel in Italy caused a scandal, as the Soviet authorities forced Pasternak to renounce his 1958 Nobel Prize and denounced as an internal White emigre and a Fascist fifth columnist. Pasternak was expelled from the Writer's Union.

The majority of members of the Writers' Union (Mikhail Bubennov, Georgi Markov, Galina Nikolaeva, Anatoly Rybakov, Aleksandr Chakovsky, Sergey Zalygin, Anatoly Kalinin, Daniil Granin, Yuri Nagibin, Vladimir Tendryakov, Arkady Lvov (before his emigration), Chinghiz Aitmatov, Anatoly Ivanov, Pyotr Proskurin, Boris Yekimov, among many others) continued to work in the mainstream of Socialist Realism, not without criticizing certain phenomena of Soviet reality, such as showiness, mismanagement, nepotism, and widespread poaching. However, even in officially recognized literature, not entirely canonical "mutations"—the natural Lieutenant, nostalgic Village and intellectual "Urban Prose" (Yury Trifonov), the literature of the Sixtiers and "Quiet Poetry" movements appear. Since the 1960s, Valentin Kataev has been moving away from official realism, developing his own modernist style, "Mauvism" (from the French word mauvais, "bad").

And however long the blizzard blows, whether it's three days or a week, every single day is counted as a day off, and the men are turned out to work Sunday after Sunday to make up for lost time.

— Aleksandr Solzhenitsyn, One Day in the Life of Ivan Denisovich (1962), translated by H. T. Willetts

The Khrushchev Thaw (c. 1954 – c. 1964) brought some fresh wind to literature (the term was coined after Ilya Ehrenburg's 1954 novel The Thaw). Published in 1956, Vladimir Dudintsev's novel Not by Bread Alone and Yury Dombrovsky's The Keeper of Antiquities in 1964 became two of the main literary events of the Thaw and a milestone in the process of de-Stalinization, but was soon criticized and withdrawn from circulation. The last years of life were fruitful for Nikolay Zabolotsky, who was repressed during the Stalin years. The Rose of the World, a mystical work by Daniil Andreev, based on his insights in the Vladimir Prison, was completed in 1958 and until 1991 it was known by self–publishing. The publication in 1962 of the philosophical novelist Aleksandr Solzhenitsyn's debut story One Day in the Life of Ivan Denisovich about a political prisoner became a national and international sensation. Poetry of the Sixtiers or Russian New Wave became a mass-cultural phenomenon: Bella Akhmadulina, Boris Slutsky, Victor Sosnora, Robert Rozhdestvensky, Andrei Voznesensky, and Yevgeny Yevtushenko, read their poems in stadiums and attracted huge crowds, as follows:

I don’t know about the rest of you,
but I feel the cruelest
nostalgia — not for the past —
but nostalgia for the present.

— Andrei Voznesensky, Nostalgia for the Present (1976), translated by Vera Dunham and H. W. Tjalsma

Such exponents of neo-Acmeist poetry as Arseny Tarkovsky, Semyon Lipkin, David Samoylov, Alexander Kushner and Oleg Chukhontsev, the representatives "quiet poetry" Anatoly Zhigulin, Stanislav Kunyaev, Nikolay Rubtsov and Yury Kuznetsov, and also Gleb Gorbovsky, bard Novella Matveyeva, Yunna Morits, and Gleb Semenov's lyrical poetry also stood apart from the socrealist mainstream.

The Village Prose was a movement in Soviet literature beginning during the Khrushchev Thaw, which included works that cultivated nostalgia of rural life. Valentin Ovechkin's story District Routine (1952), expose managerial inefficiency, the self-interest of party functionaries, was the starting point of the movement. Its major members Alexander Yashin, Fyodor Abramov, Boris Mozhayev, Viktor Astafyev, Vladimir Soloukhin, Vasily Shukshin, Vasily Belov, and Valentin Rasputin clustered in the traditionalist and nationalist Nash Sovremennik literary magazine.

Since 1985/86, the Perestroika—a period of great changes in the political and cultural life in the USSR—gave way to a wide diversity of banned previously and new writings. In 1986 there was established the legal non-Realistic literary club "Poetry", among its members were Dmitry Prigov, Igor Irtenyev, Aleksandr Yeryomenko, Sergey Gandlevsky, and Yuri Arabov. Many previously suppressed works were published among first, in 1986–87, anti-Stalinist Alexander Bek's novel The New Appointment (1965) and Anatoly Rybakov's Children of the Arbat trilogy. The events of the theater of the absurd were postmodern plays of Nina Sadur. Among the best writers of "alternative fiction," openly discussing previously taboo themes, were Mikhail Kurayev (b. 1939), Valery Popov, Tatyana Tolstaya, and Viktor Yerofeyev.

==== Soviet nonconformism ====
Some writers dared to oppose Soviet ideology, like short-story writer Varlam Shalamov (1907–1982) and Nobel Prize-winning novelist Aleksandr Solzhenitsyn (1918–2008), who wrote about life in the gulag camps, or Vasily Grossman (1905–1964), with his description of World War II events countering the Soviet official historiography (his epic novel Life and Fate (1959) was not published in the Soviet Union until the perestroika). Such writers, dubbed "dissidents", could not publish their major works until the 1960s.

Modernist and Postmodern dissident literature was related and partially coincided with the Soviet nonconformist art movement. From 1953 to 1957, the Mansard Group—first unofficial poetry group—existed till its leader Leonid Chertkov (1933–2000) was imprisoned, among other members Galina Andreeva (1933–2016) and Stanislav Krasovitsky (b. 1935). Another poetry group of '50s in Leningrad was the Philological School that included Mikhail Eremin (1936–2022), Sergey Kulle (1936–1984), Leonid Vinogradov (1936–2004) and poet and artist Vladimir Uflyand (1937–2007). Some poets were both artists or participants and inspirers of art groups, such as Evgenii Kropivnitsky (1893–1979), Igor Kholin, Genrikh Sapgir, Vilen Barskyi (1930–2012), Roald Mandelstam (1932–1961), Vsevolod Nekrasov (1934–2009), Mikhail Eremin (1936–2022), Igor Sinyavin (1937–2000), Alexei Khvostenko (1940–2004), Dmitry Prigov (1940–2007), Kari Unksova (1941–1983), Ry Nikonova (1942–2014), Oleg Grigoriev (1943–1992), Valery Kholodenko (1945–1993), Serge Segay (1947–2014), and Vladimir Sorokin (b. 1955).

But the late 1950s thaw did not last long. In the 1970s, some of the most prominent authors were not only banned from publishing but were also prosecuted for their anti-Soviet sentiments, or for parasitism, thus writers Yuli Daniel (1925–1988) and Leonid Borodin (1938–2011) was imprisoned. Solzhenitsyn and Nobel Prize–winning poet Joseph Brodsky (1940–1996) were expelled from the country. Others, such as writers and poets David Dar (1910–1980), Viktor Nekrasov (1911–1987), Lev Kopelev (1912–1997), Aleksandr Galich (1918–1977), Arkadiy Belinkov (1921–2019), Elizaveta Mnatsakanova (1922–2006), Alexander Zinoviev (1922–2006), Naum Korzhavin (1925–2018), Andrei Sinyavsky (1925–1997), Arkady Lvov (1927–2020), Yuz Aleshkovsky (1929–2022), Anatoly Kuznetsov (1929–1979), Vilen Barskyi, Vladimir Maksimov (1930–1995), Yuri Mamleev (1931–2015), Georgi Vladimov (1931–2003), Vasily Aksyonov (1932–2009), Vladimir Voinovich (1932–2018), Leonid Chertkov, Anatoly Gladilin (1935–2018), Anri Volokhonsky (1936–2017), Vadim Kreid (b. 1936), Andrei Bitov (1937–2018), Igor Sinyavin, Alexei Khvostenko, Sergei Dovlatov (1941–1990), Eduard Limonov (1943–2020), and Sasha Sokolov (b. 1943), had to emigrate to the West, while Oleg Grigoriev and Venedikt Yerofeyev (1938–1990) "emigrated" to alcoholism, and repressed still in Stalinist years poet Yury Aikhenvald (1928–1993) with some others to translations, and Kari Unksova and Yury Dombrovsky (1909–1978) were murdered, Dombrovsky shortly after publishing his novel The Faculty of Useless Knowledge (1975). Their books were not published officially until the perestroika period of the 1980s, although fans continued to reprint them manually in a manner called "samizdat" (self-publishing).

In 1960s arose unofficial Soviet second Russian avant-garde and Russian postmodernism. In 1965–72, at Leningrad existed the avantgardist Absurdist poetic and writing group "Khelenkuts", which included Vladimir Erl and Aleksandr Mironov, among others. Andrei Bitov was Postmodernism first proponent. In 1970, Venedikt Erofeyev's surrealist postmodern prose poem Moscow-Petushki was published via samizdat. The Soviet emigrant Sasha Sokolov wrote surrealist A School for Fools in 1973 and the completely postmodern novel Between Dog and Wolf in 1980. Other remarkable postmodern novels were Eduard Limonov's It's Me, Eddie, Vladimir Voinovich's The Life and Extraordinary Adventures of Private Ivan Chonkin, Vasily Aksyonov's The Island of Crimea and Vladimir Sorokin's The Norm. Sergei Dovlatov, Valery Popov, and Yevgeni Popov predominantly wrote short stories. Since '70s there were such postmodern unofficial movements as Moscow Conceptualists with elements of concrete poetry (Vsevolod Nekrasov, Dmitry Prigov, writer and literary scholar Viktor Yerofeyev, Lev Rubinstein, Timur Kibirov, early Vladimir Sorokin) and Metarealism, namely metaphysical realism, used complex metaphors which they called meta-metaphors (Konstantin Kedrov, Viktor Krivulin, Elena Katsyuba, Ivan Zhdanov, Elena Shvarts, Vladimir Aristov, Aleksandr Yeryomenko, scholar Svetlana Kekova, Yuri Arabov, Alexei Parshchikov, Sergei Nadeem and Nikolai Kononov). Arkadii Dragomoshchenko is considered the foremost representative of the Language Poets in Russian literature. In Yeysk, there was the "Transfurist" group of mixing verbal, sound and visual poetry (Ry Nikonova and Serge Segay, among others). As mentioned Leonid Vinogradov, as well as members of List of characters group Mikhail Faynerman and Ivan Akhmetyev were exponents of Minimalist verse. The banned from publishing Chuvash and Russian poet Gennadiy Aygi had been creating experimental surrealist verses as follows:

And we utter a few words — simply because
we’re scared of silence
and deem any movement dangerous

— Gennadiy Aygi, Our Way, translated by Anatoly Kudryavitsky

Among other underground poets and writers were the exponent of stream of consciousness prose Pavel Ulitin, Dmitry Avaliani, Yevgeny Kharitonov, economist and poet Yevgeny Saburov, Elena Ignatova, Mikhail Aizenberg and Yevgeny Bunimovich, as well partially banned Vladimir Dudintsev, Fazil Iskander and Olga Sedakova.

=== Popular Soviet genres ===
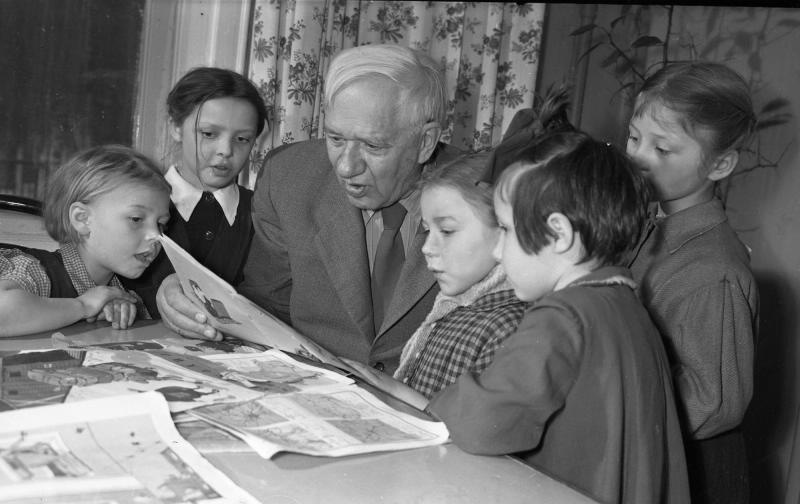
Korney Chukovsky and children, 1959

Children's literature in the Soviet Union counted as a major genre because of its educational role. A large share of early-Soviet children's books were poems: Korney Chukovsky (1882–1969), Samuil Marshak (1887–1964) and Agnia Barto (1906–1981) were among the most read poets. "Adult" poets, such as Mayakovsky and Sergey Mikhalkov (1913–2009), contributed to the genre as well. Some of the early Soviet children's prose consisted of loose adaptations of foreign fairy-tales unknown in contemporary Russia. Alexey N. Tolstoy (1882–1945) wrote Buratino, a light-hearted and shortened adaptation of Carlo Collodi's Pinocchio. Alexander Volkov (1891–1977) introduced fantasy fiction to Soviet children with his loose translation of L. Frank Baum's The Wonderful Wizard of Oz, published as The Wizard of the Emerald City in 1939, and then wrote a series of five sequels, unrelated to Baum. Other notable authors include Nikolay Nosov (1908–1976), Lazar Lagin (1903–1979), Vitaly Bianki (1894–1959) and Vladimir Suteev (1903–1993).

While fairy tales were relatively free from ideological oppression, the realistic children's prose of the Stalinist era was highly ideological and pursued the goal to raise children as patriots and communists. A notable writer in this vein was Arkady Gaydar (1904–1941), himself a Red Army commander (colonel) in Russian Civil War: his stories and plays about Timur describe a team of young pioneer volunteers who help the elderly and resist hooligans. There was a genre of hero-pioneer story that bore some similarities with Christian genre of hagiography. In the times of Khrushchov (First Secretary of the Central Committee of the Communist Party of the Soviet Union from 1953 to 1964) and of Brezhnev (in power 1966–1982), however, the pressure lightened. Mid- and late-Soviet children's books by Eduard Uspensky, Yuri Entin, Viktor Dragunsky bear no signs of propaganda. In the 1970s many of these books, as well as stories by foreign children's writers, were adapted into animation. The famous and widely popular satirists were Mikhail Zoshchenko, Valentin Kataev and the writing tandem Ilf and Petrov, described problems of post-Revolutionary Soviet society.

Soviet Science fiction, inspired by scientistic revolution, industrialisation, and the country's space pioneering, was flourishing, albeit in the limits allowed by censors. Early science fiction authors, such as Alexander Belyaev, Grigory Adamov, Vladimir Obruchev, Aleksey Nikolayevich Tolstoy, stuck to hard science fiction and regarded H. G. Wells and Jules Verne as examples to follow. Two notable exceptions to this trend were early Soviet dissidents Yevgeny Zamyatin, author of dystopian novel We, and Mikhail Bulgakov, who used science fiction in Heart of a Dog, The Fatal Eggs and Ivan Vasilyevich to satirize Communist ideology vs. what it is actual practice. Like the dissident writers of the future, Zamyatin and Bulgakov had serious problems with publishing their books due to censorship in the Soviet Union.

Since the Khrushchev thaw in the 1950s, Soviet science fiction began to form its own style. Philosophy, ethics, utopian and dystopian ideas became its core, and Social science fiction was the most popular subgenre. Although the view of Earth's future as that of utopian communist society was the only view that was welcome, the liberties of genre still offered a loophole for free expression. Books of brothers Arkady and Boris Strugatsky, and Kir Bulychev, among others, are reminiscent of social problems and often include satire of contemporary Soviet society. Ivan Yefremov, on the contrary, arose to fame with his utopian views on future as well as on Ancient Greece in his historical novels. The Strugatskies are also credited for the Soviet's first science fantasy, the Monday Begins on Saturday trilogy. Other notable science fiction writers included Vladimir Savchenko, Georgy Gurevich, Alexander Kazantsev, Georgy Martynov, Yeremey Parnov.

Space opera was less developed, since both state censors and serious writers watched it unfavorably. Nevertheless, there were moderately successful attempts to adapt space westerns to Soviet soil. The first was Alexander Kolpakov with "Griada", after came Sergey Snegov with "Men Like Gods", among others. A specific branch of both science fiction and children's books appeared in mid-Soviet era: the children's science fiction. It was meant to educate children while entertaining them. The star of the genre was Bulychov, who, along with his adult books, created children's space adventure series about Alisa Selezneva, a teenage girl from the future. Others include Nikolay Nosov with his books about dwarf Neznayka, Evgeny Veltistov, who wrote about robot boy Electronic, Vitaly Melentyev, Vladislav Krapivin, Vitaly Gubarev. Mystery was another popular genre. Detectives by Vayner Brothers and spy novels by Yulian Semyonov were best-selling, and many of them were adapted into film or TV in the 1970s and 1980s. Village Prose is a genre that conveys nostalgic descriptions of rural life. Valentin Rasputin's 1976 novel, Proshchaniye s Matyoroy (Farewell to Matyora) depicted a village faced with destruction to make room for a hydroelectric plant.

Historical fiction in the early Soviet era included a large share of memoirs, fictionalized or not. Valentin Katayev and Lev Kassil wrote semi-autobiographic books about children's life in Tsarist Russia. Vladimir Gilyarovsky wrote Moscow and Muscovites, about life in pre-revolutionary Moscow. There were also attempts to write an epic novel about the Revolution, similar to Leo Tolstoy's War and Peace, based on the writers' own experience. Aleksey Tolstoy's The Road to Calvary (1920–1941) and Mikhail Sholokhov's And Quiet Flows the Don (1928–1940) depict Russia from the start of the Revolution to the end of the Civil War. The Road to Calvary demonstrates the victory of socialist ideas, while And Quiet Flows the Don gives a realist and a brutal image. Maxim Gorky's and Andrei Bely's experimental novels The Life of Klim Samgin (1925–1936) and Moscow (1926–1931) trace the relationship of Russian intelligentsia with the revolutionary movement. Mikhail Bulgakov conceived to write a trilogy about the Civil War, but wrote only the first part, The White Guard (1923). Yury Tynyanov focused on fictional biographies of the Golden Age writers: The Death of Vazir-Mukhtar (1928) and Pushkin (1935–1943). The late Soviet historical fiction was dominated by World War II novels and short stories by authors such as the representatives of Lieutenant prose (such as Vasil Bykov), Vasily Grossman, Konstantin Simonov, Boris Vasilyev, Viktor Astafyev, among others, based on the authors' own war experience. Vasily Yan and Konstantin Badygin are best known for their novels on Medieval Rus, and Yury Tynyanov for writing on Russian Empire. Valentin Pikul wrote about many different epochs and countries in an Alexander Dumas-inspired style. In the 1970s there appeared a relatively independent Village Prose, whose most prominent representatives were Viktor Astafyev and Valentin Rasputin.

Any sort of fiction that dealt with the occult, either horror, adult-oriented fantasy or magic realism, was unwelcome in Soviet Russia. Until the 1980s very few books in these genres were written, and even fewer were published, although earlier books, such as by Gogol, were not banned. Of the rare exceptions, Bulgakov in Master and Margarita (not published in author's lifetime) and Strugatskies in Monday Begins on Saturday introduced magic and mystical creatures into contemporary Soviet reality to satirize it. Another exception was early Soviet writer Alexander Grin, who wrote neo-Romantic tales, both realistic and fantastic.

== Bronze Age ==
=== Post-Soviet 1990s ===
The end of the 20th century proved a difficult period for Russian literature, with relatively few distinct voices. Although the limited censorship of the period of glasnost was lifted, de facto since 1989 in the Soviet Union, de jure in 1990, and writers could now freely express their thoughts, the political and economic chaos of the 1990s affected the book market and literature heavily. The book printing industry descended into crisis, the number of printed book copies dropped several times in comparison to Soviet era, and it took about a decade to revive. Some major thick literary magazines went bankrupt. And "writers' traditional special place in society no longer is recognised by most Russians..."

My words are awkward, like farts at a funeral, but sincere, like screams during interrogations…

— Vladimir Sorokin, Blue Lard (1999), translated by the Wikipedia editors

Among the most discussed figures of this period were authors Victor Pelevin (b. 1962), disputably related to postmodernism and the New Sincerity movement, who is author of the Zen-inspired Chapayev and the Void, "the first novel which takes place in an absolute vacuum," postmodernist novelist and playwright Vladimir Sorokin (b. 1955, the novels Their Four Hearts and Blue Lard), who started an underground writing career still in the early 1980s, and the conceptualist poet Dmitry Prigov (1940–2007). Among other significant Postmodern works are Lyudmila Petrushevskaya's novella The Time: Night, Anatoly Korolyov's novel Eron, Yevgeni Popov's novel The Real Story of the "Green musicians", Tatyana Tolstaya's novel The Stynx, Vladimir Sharov's historiosophical prose as well the Israeli literary scholar and later novelist Alexander Goldstein's variable essays.

The tradition of the classic Russian realistic novel with modernist, magic realism and new "postrealism" elements continues with such authors as: (1) the living Soviet classics Leonid Leonov, Viktor Astafyev, Yury Davydov (novel The Bestseller), Valentin Rasputin, Viktoriya Tokareva and Vladimir Makanin; (2) the Soviet nonconformists Aleksandr Solzhenitsyn, Georgi Vladimov (a novel The General and His Army) and Vasily Aksyonov (the trilogy Generations of Winter); (3) "new wave" of playwright and theatre director Nikolay Kolyada (b. 1957), Aleksey Varlamov (b. 1963), Pavel Krusanov (b. 1961) and Mikhail Shishkin (b. 1961). Short stories of Sergei Dovlatov who emigrated to the US in 1979 and died in 1990 became very popular in Russia posthumously. A relatively new trend in Russian literature is that female short story writers mentioned Viktoriya Tokareva and Lyudmila Petrushevskaya or Tatyana Tolstaya, and novelists Lyudmila Ulitskaya, Nina Sadur, Irina Polyanskaya (1952–2004), Dina Rubina or Valeriya Narbikova (b. 1958) have come into prominence.

Detective stories and thrillers have proven a very successful genre of new Russian literature: in the 1990s serial detective novels by Alexandra Marinina, Polina Dashkova and Darya Dontsova were published in millions of copies. In the next decade Boris Akunin who wrote more sophisticated popular fiction, e.g., a series of novels about the 19th century sleuth Erast Fandorin, was eagerly read across the country. Science fiction was always well selling, albeit second to fantasy, that was relatively new to Russian readers. These genres boomed in the late 1990s, with authors like Sergey Lukyanenko, Nick Perumov, Maria Semenova, Vera Kamsha, Alexey Pehov, Anton Vilgotsky and Vadim Panov. A good share of modern Russian science fiction and fantasy is written in Ukraine, especially in Kharkiv, home to H. L. Oldie, Alexander Zorich, Yuri Nikitin and Andrey Valentinov. Many others hail from Kyiv, including Marina and Sergey Dyachenko and Vladimir Arenev. Significant contribution to Russian horror literature has been done by Ukrainians Andrey Dashkov and Alexander Vargo. Russian poetry of that period produced a number of avant-garde greats. The Moscow Conceptualists and followers of Concrete poetry, such as mentioned Dmitry Prigov, Lev Rubinstein, Anna Alchuk and Timur Kibirov (also novelist and literary scholar Viktor Yerofeyev), and the members of the Lianosovo group of nonconformist poets, notably Genrikh Sapgir, Igor Kholin and Vsevolod Nekrasov, who previously chose to refrain from publication in Soviet periodicals, became very influential, especially in Moscow, and the same goes for another masterful experimental neo-surrealist Chuvash and Russian poet, Gennadiy Aygi.

Also popular were poets following some other poetic trends, e.g., members of "neo-Baroque" poetry school (not to be confused with neo-Baroque architecture) Ivan Zhdanov, Elena Shvarts, Aleksandr Yeryomenko and Alexei Parshchikov, Konstantin Kedrov and Elena Katsuba from DOOS, scholar Svetlana Kekova, Sergei Nadeem and Nikolai Kononov from Saratov club Cocoon, Vladimir Aristov, Yuri Arabov and other representatives of the 1970–80s Metarealism, who all used complex metaphors which they called meta-metaphors; in St. Petersburg, members of New Leningrad Poetry School that included not only the famous Joseph Brodsky but also Viktor Krivulin, Sergey Stratanovsky and Elena Shvarts, and such members of Philological School as Mikhail Eremin, Leonid Vinogradov, Vladimir Uflyand and the Russian-American scholar Lev Loseff, were prominent first in the Soviet-times underground—and later in mainstream poetry; minimalist verse was represented since 1970s by members of List of characters group Mikhail Faynerman, Ivan Akhmetyev and later by Alexander Makarov-Krotkov; in 1992 emerged, the Meloimaginist group related to previous Imaginism and included such poets and novelists as Russian-Irish bilingual Anatoly Kudryavitsky and Ludmila Vaturina; among other names, poets with nonconformist background Russian-Austrian musicolog Elizaveta Mnatsakanova, Galina Andreeva, Leonid Chertkov, Stanislav Krasovitsky, Dmitry Avaliani, Ry Nikonova, economist Yevgeny Saburov, Russian-Israeli author Elena Ignatova, Mikhail Aizenberg, Yevgeny Bunimovich and Dimitry Grigoriev, also poet and writer Nikolaĭ Baĭtov, the Russian-German scholar Sergey Biryukov with futurist and surrealist background, Irina Iermakova, Vitaly Kalpidi, the unable to publish during Soviet years scholar Olga Sedakova, and Borys Khersonskyi. Notable poets of younger generation are Elena Fanailova (b. 1962), German Lukomnikov (b. 1962), Vera Pavlova (b. 1963), Grigory Dashevsky (1964–2013), Sergei Kruglov (b. 1966), Dmitry Kuzmin (b. 1968), Arseniy Rovinsky (b. 1968), Asya Shneiderman (b. 1968), Maxim Amelin (b. 1970), Mikhail Gronas (b. 1970), Fyodor Svarovsky (b. 1971), Stanislav Lvovsky (b. 1972), Maria Stepanova (b. 1972), Alina Vitukhnovskaya (b. 1973), Inga Kuznetsova (b. 1974), Boris Ryzhy (1974–2001), Shish Bryansky (b. 1975), Linor Goralik (b. 1975), Kirill Medvedev (b. 1975), and Polina Barskova (b. 1976).

=== 21st century ===
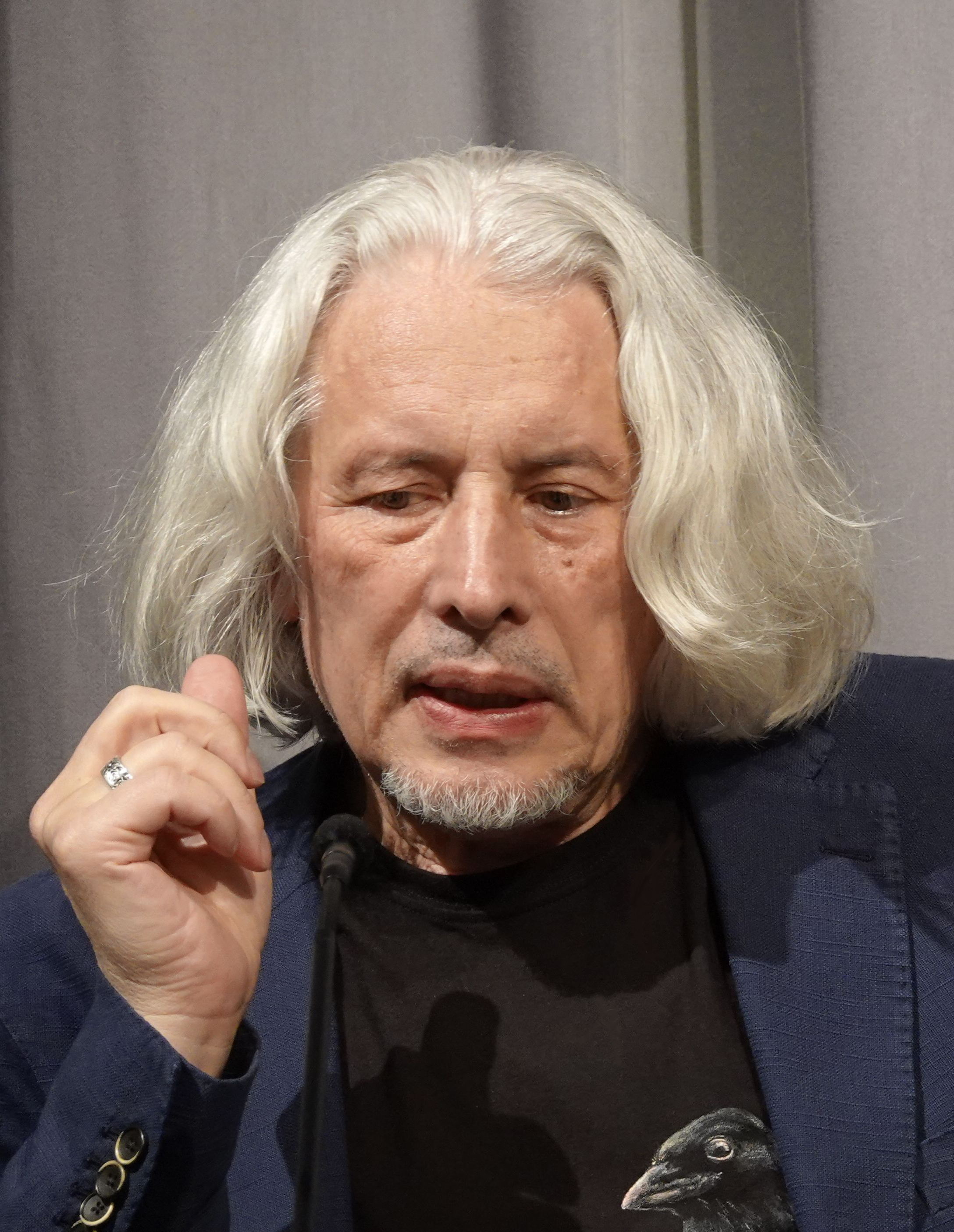
Vladimir Sorokin reading in 2022 at Literaturhaus Zürich, Germany

At the beginning of the 21st century, Victor Pelevin and Vladimir Sorokin remained the leading and prolific Russian writers. Pelevin became the most extensively translated one into English. Also significant are the new works of Boris Akunin (adventure fiction), Lyudmila Ulitskaya (the Daniel Stein, Interpreter, a novel about the Holocaust and interreligious relations), and Mikhali Shishkin (the novel Maidenhair).

Among the debutants in prose are Eduard Kochergin (b. 1937) with his novels Angel's Doll and Baptized with Crosses, Alexei Ivanov (b. 1969) known for his novel The Heart of Parma, a Russian-Israeli writer and poet in the philosophical-symbolic vein Alexander Ilichevsky (b. 1970), who wrote The Persian and the Newton's Drawing, the author of novel The Librarian Mikhail Elizarov (b. 1973), and German Sadulaev (b. 1973) with the book I am a Chechen! In the second decade of the century, the following novelists gained fame: Eugene Vodolazkin (b. 1964) for The Laurus (one of ten best world novels about God by The Guardian version), Sofia Sinitskaya (b. 1972), the author of the neutral novel Black Siberia on Russo-Ukrainian War, and Alexei Salnikov (b. 1978) for his hallucinatory The Petrovs in and Around the Flu (regarded as a rare outstanding text, see also the film Petrov's Flu). In the form of popular fiction, post-apocalyptic novels of Dmitry Glukhovsky (b. 1979) are successful.

Almost all of the authors named criticized Putinism and have left Russia. After 2022, they have been "canceled" and their books have been withdrawn from a number of Russian booksellers. Examples of active supporters of the political regime among eminent writers are poet Yunna Morits (b. 1937) and nationalists Alexander Prokhanov (b. 1938), Yurii Poliakov (b. 1954) Pavel Krusanov (b. 1961) and Zakhar Prilepin (b. 1975).

A new generation of Russian authors appeared, differing greatly from the postmodernist Russian prose of the late 20th century, which led critics to speak about "new realism" as one of several contemporary literary trends (Pavel Basinsky (b. 1961), Aleksey Varlamov (b. 1963), Alexei Ivanov, Andrei Rubanov (b. 1969), Oleg Pavlov (1970–2018), Andrei Ivanov (b. 1971), Roman Senchin (b. 1971), German Sadulaev, Zakhar Prilepin, and others).

The treasury of Russian poetry has been replenished with works by both senior masters, like Oleg Chukhontsev (b. 1938), and such debutants as Natalia Azarova (b. 1956), Vsevolod Emelin (b. 1959), Tatiana Grauz (b. 1964), Andrei Polyakov (b. 1968), Andrei Sen-Senkov (b. 1968), Tania Skarynkina (b. 1969), Igor Bulatovsky (b. 1971), Vlad Malenko (b. 1971), Andrei Rodionov (b. 1971), Anna Glazova (b. 1973), Victor Ivaniv (1977–2015), Eugenia Rits (b. 1977), Ekaterina Simonova (b. 1977), Pavel Goldin (b. 1978), Nika Skandiaka (b. 1978), Anna Zolotaryova (b. 1978), Roman Osminkin (b. 1979), Sergey Tenyatnikov (b. 1981), Vasily Borodin (1982–2021), Tatiana Moseeva (b. 1983), Alla Gorbunova (b. 1985), Vera Polozkova (b. 1986), Yevgenia Suslova (b. 1986), Nikita Ivanov (b. 1989), Galina Rymbu (b. 1990), Daria Serenko (b. 1993), and Maria Malinovskaya (b. 1994). The main trends of contemporary poetry are neo-surrealist fragmentation, as well as the return of plot poetry among representatives of the “New Epic” movement. Two new literary prizes were established and became influential: the Big Book and the National Bestseller.

== List of movements ==
The following is a list of international and regiinal literary movements, those represented in Russian literature. Their notable members ordering is predominantly by precedence.

Movement	Key members
Baroque	Johann Gottfried Gregorii, Symeon of Polotsk, Demetrius of Rostov, Theophan Prokopovich
Classicism	Vasily Trediakovsky, Antiochus Kantemir, Mikhail Lomonosov, Alexander Sumarokov, Mikhail Sobakin, Vasily Maykov, Mikhail Kheraskov, Gavrila Derzhavin, Denis Fonvizin, Ivan Krylov
Rococo	Ippolit Bogdanovich
Sentimentalism	Alexander Radishchev, Yury Neledinsky-Meletsky, Ivan Dmitriev, Nikolay Karamzin. Vladislav Ozerov
Romanticism	Alexander Pushkin, Mikhail Lermontov, Vasily Zhukovsky, Konstantin Batyushkov, Alexander Bestuzhev, Yevgeny Baratynsky, Vladimir Odoyevsky, Fyodor Tyutchev
Realism	Nikolai Gogol, Ivan Goncharov, Ivan Turgenev, Fyodor Dostoyevsky, Leo Tolstoy, Nikolai Leskov, Anton Chekhov, Ivan Bunin, Mikhail Bulgakov
Natural school, Social realism	Nikolay Nekrasov, Ivan Goncharov, Ivan Turgenev, Mikhail Saltykov-Shchedrin, Nikolay Chernyshevsky, Vikenty Veresaev, Maxim Gorky, Aleksandr Tvardovsky
Naturalism	Fyodor Dostoyevsky, Aleksey Pisemsky, Aleksandr Kuprin, Mikhail Artsybashev, Nikolay Kolyada
Neo-romanticism	early Maxim Gorky, Alexander Grin, Konstantin Paustovsky
Symbolism	Vladimir Solovyov, Valery Bryusov, Vyacheslav Ivanov, Fyodor Sologub, Dmitry Merezhkovsky, Zinaida Gippius, Alexander Blok, Andrei Bely
Modernism	Andrei Bely, Aleksey Remizov, Yevgeny Zamyatin, Boris Pasternak, Vladimir Nabokov, others
New peasant poets	Nikolai Klyuev, Sergei Klychkov, Sergei Yesenin
Cubo-Futurism	David Burliuk, Velimir Khlebnikov, Aleksei Kruchenykh, Nikolai Aseyev, Vladimir Mayakovsky
Ego-Futurism	Igor Severyanin, Vasilisk Gnedov
Acmeism	Anna Akhmatova, Nikolay Gumilev, Georgiy Ivanov, Mikhail Kuzmin, Osip Mandelstam
Expressionism	Leonid Andreyev, Aleksey Remizov, Artyom Vesyoly
Russian formalism	Viktor Shklovsky, Yury Tynyanov
Imaginism	Sergei Yesenin, Anatoly Marienhof, Rurik Ivnev
Oberiu	Daniil Kharms, Konstantin Vaginov, Alexander Vvedensky, Nikolay Zabolotsky
Paris Note	Georgy Adamovich, Igor Chinnov, George Ivask, Anatoly Shteiger, Lidia Tcherminskaia
Socialist realism	Maxim Gorky, Valentin Kataev, Leonid Leonov, Alexander Fadeyev, Nikolai Ostrovsky, Mikhail Sholokhov, Boris Polevoy, Sergey Zalygin, Konstantin Simonov, Yuri Nagibin, Vladimir Tendryakov, Yury Trifonov, Chinghiz Aitmatov
Lieutenant prose	Viktor Nekrasov, Konstantin Vorobyov, Grigory Baklanov, Yuri Bondarev, Boris Vasilyev
Village prose	Valentin Ovechkin, Alexander Yashin, Fyodor Abramov, Boris Mozhayev, Viktor Astafyev, Vladimir Soloukhin, Vasily Shukshin, Vasily Belov, Valentin Rasputin
Neo-Acmeism	Arseny Tarkovsky, Semyon Lipkin, David Samoylov, Alexander Kushner, Bella Akhmadulina, Oleg Chukhontsev
The Sixtiers	Robert Rozhdestvensky, Andrei Voznesensky, Yevgeny Yevtushenko, Victor Sosnora, Bella Akhmadulina, Alexander Vampilov
Soviet nonconformism	Vasily Grossman, Varlam Shalamov, Yury Dombrovsky, Viktor Nekrasov, Aleksandr Solzhenitsyn, Pavel Ulitin, Alexander Zinoviev, Andrei Sinyavsky, Vasily Aksyonov, Vladimir Voinovich, Andrei Bitov, Venedikt Yerofeyev, Joseph Brodsky, Dmitry Prigov, Sergei Dovlatov, Yevgeny Kharitonov, Sasha Sokolov, Lev Rubinstein
Stream of consciousness	Pavel Ulitin
Postmodernism	Vladimir Nabokov, Andrei Bitov, Genrikh Sapgir, Vladimir Voinovich, Venedikt Yerofeyev, Lyudmila Petrushevskaya, Valery Popov, Sergei Dovlatov, Eduard Limonov, Sasha Sokolov, Anatoly Korolyov, Yevgeni Popov, Nina Sadur, Tatyana Tolstaya, Vladimir Sorokin, Victor Pelevin
Moscow Conceptualism	Vsevolod Nekrasov, Dmitry Prigov, Viktor Yerofeyev, Lev Rubinstein, Anna Alchuk, Timur Kibirov, Vladimir Sorokin, Julia Kissina
Metarealism	Konstantin Kedrov, Viktor Krivulin, Elena Katsyuba, Ivan Zhdanov, Elena Shvarts, Vladimir Aristov, Aleksandr Yeryomenko, Yuri Arabov, Alexei Parshchikov
Language poetry	Arkadii Dragomoshchenko
Performance poetry	Dmitry Prigov, Ry Nikonova, Serge Segay, Andrei Rodionov, Roman Osminkin
(Neo)surrealism	Boris Poplavsky, Yevgeny Zamyatin, Daniil Kharms, Gennadiy Aygi, Venedikt Yerofeyev, Sergey Biryukov, Anatoly Kudryavitsky, Dmitry Grigoriev, Sergey Tenyatnikov, Tatyana Graus, Anna Glazova, Inga Kuznetsova
Magic realism	Andrei Sinyavsky, Nina Sadur, Olga Slavnikova, Pavel Krusanov, Pavel Pepperstein, Lora Beloivan
Minimalism	Leonid Vinogradov, Mikhail Faynerman, Ivan Akhmetyev, Alexander Makarov-Krotkov
Postpostmodernism, new sincerity	Anatoly Korolyov, Alexander Goldstein, Victor Pelevin
New Epic	Elena Fanailova, Fyodor Svarovsky, Maria Stepanova, Linor Goralik

== Russian Nobel laureates in literature ==
1. Ivan Bunin (1933)
2. Boris Pasternak (1958)
3. Mikhail Sholokhov (1965)
4. Aleksandr Solzhenitsyn (1970)
5. Joseph Brodsky (1987)
6. Svetlana Alexievich (2015)

== See also ==
- List of Russian-language novelists
- List of Russian-language playwrights
- List of Russian-language poets
- List of Russian-language writers
- List of Russian philosophers
- Russian fairy tale
- Russian science fiction and fantasy
- Russian literature of Ukraine
- Pushkin House
- Anti-Booker prize
- Russian Booker Prize
- Geographical distribution of Russian speakers
- List of libraries in Russia

== Bibliography ==
=== Works cited ===
- Adonyeva, Svetlana; Olson, Laura J. (2011). "Interpreting the Past, Postulating the Future: Memorate as Plot and Script among Rural Russian Women". Journal of Folklore Research. 48 (2): 133–166. doi:10.2979/jfolkrese.48.2.133. ISSN 0737-7037.
- Alexander, Alex E. (1973). Bylina and Fairy Tale: The Origins of Russian Heroic Poetry. The Hague; Paris: Mouton & Co.
- Beasly, Ina (1928). "The Dramatic Art of Ostrovsky (Alexander Nikolayevich Ostrovsky, 1823–86)". The Slavonic and East European Review. 6 (18): 603–617. JSTOR 4202212.
- Brown, Edward J. (1982) [1963]. Russian Literature Since the Revolution (Rev. ed.). Cambridge, Ma; London: Harvard University Press. ISBN 0-674-78203-8.
- Cornwell, Neil, ed. (2001). The Routledge Companion to Russian Literature. London; New York: Routledge. ISBN 0-415-23365-8.
- Cornwell, Neil; Christian, Nicole, eds. (1998). Reference Guide to Russian Literature. London; Chicago, Il: Fitzroy Dearborn Pub. ISBN 1-884964-10-9.
- Cosgrove, Simon (2004). Russian Nationalism and the Politics of Soviet Literature: The Case of Nash sovremennik, 1981–1991. New York: Palgrave Macmillan. ISBN 978-1-349-42145-9.
- Curtis, Glenn E.; Leighton, Marian (1998). "Literature". In Curtis, Glenn E. (ed.). Russia: A Country Study. Area handbook series. Library of Congress, Federal Research Division (1st ed.). Washington, DC: U.S. Government Printing Office. pp. 222–228. ISBN 0-8444-0866-2. Archived from the original on 9 July 2021. | via Archive.org
- Dobrenko, Evgeny; Lipovetsky, Mark, eds. (2015). Russian Literature since 1991. Cambridge: Cambridge University Press. ISBN 978-1-107-06851-3.
- Egorova, L. P.; Fokin, A. A.; Ivanova, I. N.; et al. (2014). L. P. Egorova (ed.). История русской литературы XX века (первая половина): в 2 кн. Кн. 1: Общие вопросы [History of Russian Literature of the 20th Century. The first half: In 2 books. Book 1: General questions] (PDF) (Textbook) (in Russian) (2nd ed.). Moscow: Flinta. ISBN 978-5-9765-1834-6.
- Epstein, Mikhail; Genis, Alexander; Vladiv-Glover, Slobodanka (2016) [1999]. Russian Postmodernism: New Perspectives on Post-Soviet Culture. Translated by Slobodanka Vladiv-Glover (Rev. ed.). New York; Oxford: Berghahn Books. ISBN 978-1-78238-864-7.
- Freeborn, Richard (1982). The Russian Revolutionary Novel: Turgenev to Pasternak. Cambridge: Cambridge University Press. ISBN 0-521-24442-0.
- Geldern, James von; Stites, Richard, eds. (1995). Mass Culture in Soviet Russia: Tales, Poems, Songs, Movies, Plays, and Folklore, 1917–1953. Bloomington, In: Indiana University Press. ISBN 0-253-20969-2.
- Goscilo, Helena (1996). Dehexing Sex : Russian Womanhood During and After Glasnost. Ann Arbor, Mi: University of Michigan Press.
- Johnson, Kent; Ashby, Stephen M., eds. (1992). Third Wave: The New Russian Poetry. Introd. by Andrew Wachtel and Alexei Parshchikov. Afterword by Mikhail Epstein. Ann Arbor, Mi: University of Michigan Press. ISBN 0-472-06415-0.
- Jones, Malcolm V.; Miller, Robin Feuer, eds. (1998). The Cambridge Companion to the Classic Russian Novel. Cambridge: Cambridge University Press. ISBN 0-521-47346-2.
- Kahn, Andrew; Lipovetsky, Mark; Reyfman, Irina; Sandler, Stephanie (2018). A History of Russian Literature. Oxford: Oxford University Press. ISBN 9780199663941.
- Kasack, Wolfgang (1988) [1976]. Dictionary of Russian literature Since 1917. Translated by Maria Carlson and Jane T. Hedges. New York: Columbia University Press. ISBN 0-2310-5242-1.
- Katsman, Roman; Shrayer, Maxim D., eds. (2023). Studies in the History of Russian-Israeli Literature. Brookline, Ma: Academic Studies Press. ISBN 9798887191850.
- Khagi, Sofya (2021). Pelevin and Unfreedom: Poetics, Politics, Metaphisics. Studies in Russian Literature and Theory. Evanston, Il: Northwestern University Press. ISBN 9780810143036.
- Lang, D. M. (1948). "Boileau and Sumarokov: The Manifesto of Russian Classicism". The Modern Language Review. 43 (4): 500–506. doi:10.2307/3717923. JSTOR 3717923.
- Ledkovsky, Mariana Astman; Rosenthal, Charlott; Zirin, Mary F., eds. (1994). Dictionary of Russian Women Writers. London: Bloomsbury Academic. ISBN 9780313262654.
- Lossky, N. O. (1952) [1951]. History of Russian Philosophy. London: George Allen & Unwin.
- Markov, Vladimir (1968). Russian Futurism: a History. Berkeley; Los Angeles, Ca: University of California Press.
- Matthews, William Kleesman (2013). The Structure and Development of Russian. Cambridge: Cambridge University Press. ISBN 978-1-107-61939-5.
- McMillin, Arnold, ed. (2000). Reconstructing the Canon: Russian Writing in the 1980s. Studies in Russian and European literature, 3. Amsterdam: Harwood Academic Pub. ISBN 90-5702-593-0.
- Morson, Gary Saul (2023). Wonder Confronts Certainty: Russian Writers on the Timeless Questions and Why Their Answers Matter. Harvard, Ma: Harvard University Press. ISBN 978-0-674-97180-6.
- Moser, Charles A., ed. (1992) [1989]. The Cambridge History of Russian Literature (2008 Online Version) (Rev. ed.). Cambridge: Cambridge University Press. doi:10.1017/CHOL9780521415545. ISBN 0-521-42567-0.
- Nilsson, N. (1970). The Russian imaginists. Ann Arbor, Mi: Almgvist and Wiksell.
- Painter, K. (2012). "Acmeism". In Greene, Roland; et al. (eds.). The Princeton Encyclopedia of Poetry and Poetics (4th rev. ed.). Princeton, NJ: Princeton University Press. pp. 5–6. ISBN 978-0-691-15491-6.
- Parthé, Kathleen F. (1992). Russian Village Prose: the Radiant Past. Princeton, NJ: Princeton University Press. ISBN 0-691-06889-5.
- Peterson, Ronald E. (1993). A History of Russian Symbolism. Amsterdam; Philadelphia, Pa: John Benjamins Pub. ISBN 90-272-1534-0.
- Rosenfeld, Alla; Dodge, Norton T., eds. (1995). Nonconformist Art: The Soviet Experience 1956–1986. London: Thames and Hudson. ISBN 0-500-23709-3.
- Rosenholm, Arja; Savkina, Irina (2012). "How Women Should Write': Russian Women's Writing in the Nineteenth Century". Women in Nineteenth-Century Russia. Open Book Pub. ISBN 978-1-906924-66-9. JSTOR j.ctt5vjszk.12.
- Sandler, Stephanie (2024). The Freest Speech in Russia: Poetry Unbound, 1989–2022. Princeton, NJ: Princeton University Press. ISBN 9780691261898.
- Slonim, Marc (1953). Modern Russian Literature: From Chekhov to the present. Oxford: Oxford University Press.
- Slonim, Marc (1977) [1964]. Soviet Russian Literature: Writers and Problems (Rev. ed.). Oxford: Oxford University Press.
- Slonim, Marc (1950). The Epic of Russian Literature: From its Origins Through Tolstoy. Oxford: Oxford University Press.
- Sokolov, Y. M. (1950) [1938]. Russian Folklore. Translated by Catherine Ruth Smith. New York: Macmillan.
- Steiner, Peter (1984). Russian Formalism: A Metapoetics. Ithaca, NY: Cornell University Press. ISBN 978-0-8014-1710-8. OL 23135008M.
- Strakhovsky, Leonid I. (October 1953). "The Historianism of Gogol". The American Slavic and East European Review (Slavic Review). 12 (3). Association for Slavic, East European, and Eurasian Studies: 360–370. doi:10.2307/2491790. JSTOR 2491790.
- Terras, Victor, ed. (1985). Handbook of Russian Literature. New Haven, Conn; London: Yale University Press. ISBN 0-300-04868-8.
- Vinokur, Grigory (1971). The Russian Language: A Brief History. Cambridge: Cambridge University Press. ISBN 978-0-521-07944-0.
- Wachtel, Michael (2004). The Cambridge Introduction to Russian Poetry. Cambridge Introductions to Literature. Cambridge University Press. ISBN 0-521-00493-4.
- Zaliznyak, Andrey; Yanin, Valentin (2001). "Новгородская псалтырь начала XI века — древнейшая книга Руси" [The Novgorod Psalter of the early 11th century—the oldest book of Rus']. Herald of the Russian Academy of Sciences (in Russian). 71 (3): 202–209.
- Zenkovsky, Serge A. (1963). Medieval Russia's Epics, Chronicles and Tales. New York: E. P. Dutton & Co.

=== Further reading ===
- Alexandrova, Vera (1963). A History of Soviet Literature. Translated by Mirra Ginsburg. Garden City, NY: Doubleday & Co.
- Baring, Maurice (1914–15). An Outline of Russian Literature. London: Williams and Norgate.
- Bartlett, Rosamund; Benn, Anna, eds. (1997). Literary Russia. A Guide. London: Picador. ISBN 0-333-71197-1.
- Brunson, M. (2016). Russian Realisms: Literature and Painting, 1840–1890. NIU Series in Slavic, East European, and Eurasian Studies. DeKalb, Il: Northern Illinois University Press.
- Garrard, John and Carol (1990). Inside the Soviet Writers' Union. New York: Free Press. ISBN 0-02-911320-2.
- Gasparov, Mikhail L. (2019). "The evolution of Russian rhyme". Journal of Literary Theory. 13 (1): 77–115. doi:10.1515/jlt-2019-0003. S2CID 151001595.
- Gorlin, Mikhail (November 1946). "The interrelation of painting and literature in Russia". The Slavonic and East European Review. 2 (64).
- Greene, Roland; et al., eds. (2012). "Poetry of Russia". The Princeton Encyclopedia of Poetry and Poetics (4th rev. ed.). Princeton, NJ: Princeton University Press. ISBN 978-0-691-15491-6.
- Grigoryan, B. (2018). Noble Subjects: The Russian Novel and the Gentry, 1762–1861. NIU Series in Slavic, East European, and Eurasian Studies. DeKalb, Il: Northern Illinois University Press.
- Hare, Richard (1947). Russian Literature from Pushkin to the Present Day. Home Study Books. London: Methuen & Co. Reprint: Routledge, 2021.
- Harkins, William E. (1956). Dictionary of Russian Literature. New York: Philosophical Library Pub. Reprint: Routledge, 2021.
- Holmgren, Beth, ed. (2007). The Russian Memoir: History and Literature. Studies in Russian Literature and Theory. Evanston, Il: Northwestern University Press. ISBN 978-0-8101-2428-8.
- Kelly, Catriona (1994). A History of Russian Women's Writing, 1820–1992. Oxford: Oxford University Press. ISBN 9780198159643.
- Kelly, Catriona (2001). Russian Literature: A Very Short Introduction. Oxford: Oxford University Press. ISBN 9780192801449.
- Lavrin, Janko (1948). From Pushkin to Mayakovsky, a study in the evolution of a literature. London: Sylvan Press.
- McLean, Hugh (September 1962). "The Development of Modern Russian Literature". Slavic Review. 21 (3). Cambridge University Press: 389–410. doi:10.2307/3000442. JSTOR 3000442. S2CID 163341589.
- Mirsky, D. S. (1926). Contemporary Russian Literature, 1881–1925. New York: Alfred A. Knopf. Archived from the original on 1 October 2021. Via Google Books.
- Mirsky, D. S. (1927). A History of Russian Literature: From the Earliest Times to the Death of Dostoyevsky (1881). New York: Alfred A. Knopf.
- Nilsson, Nils Åke, ed. (1982). Studies in 20th Century Russian Prose. Stockholm Studies in Russian Literature, 14. Stocholm: Almqvist & Wiksell International. ISBN 91-22-00587-0.
- Porter, Robert (1994). Russia's Alternative Prose. Oxford; Providence, Ri: Berg Pub. ISBN 0-85496-935-7.
- Senelick, Laurence (2015) [2007]. Historical Dictionary of Russian Theatre (2nd ed.). Lanham, Md: Rowman & Littlefield. ISBN 978-1-4422-4926-4.
- Slonim, Marc (1958). An Outline of Russian Literature. Oxford: Oxford University Press.
- Terras, Victor (1991). A History of Russian Literature. New Haven, Conn; London: Yale University Press. ISBN 0-300-04971-4.
- Wachtel, Michael (1998). The Development of Russian Verse: Meter and Its Meanings. Cambridge: Cambridge University Press. ISBN 0-521-62078-3.
- Waegemans, E. (2016). History of Russian Literature Since Peter the Great, 1700–2000 (Rev. ed.). Antwerp: Vrijdag.
- Weber, Harry B.; et al., eds. (1977–2002). The Modern Encyclopedia of Russian and Soviet Literatures (Including Non-Russian and Emigre literatures). Vol. 1–10. Gulf Breeze, Fl: Academic International Press. ISBN 087-569-070-X.
- Zenkovsky, Serge A.; Armbruster, David L. (1970). A Guide to the Bibliographies of Russian Literature. Nashville, Tenn: Vanderbilt University Press. ISBN 978-0-8265-1160-7.
- Ziolkowski, Margaret (1998). Literary Exorcisms of Stalinism: Russian Writers and the Soviet Past. Columbia, Sc: Camden House. ISBN 1-57113-179-5.

== Anthologies ==
- Accursed Poets: Dissident Poetry from Soviet Russia 1960–80. Ed. and trans. by Anatoly Kudryavitsky. Thirsk, UK: Smokestack Books, 2020. ISBN 978-1-9161-3929-9.
- Alexander, Alex E. (1975). Russian Folklore: An Anthology in English Translation. Belmont, Mass: Nordland Pub.
- An Anthology of Jewish-Russian Literature: Two Centuries of Dual Identity in Prose and Poetry, 1801–2001. 2 vols. Ed., selec., and cotrans. with introd. essays by Maxim D. Shrayer. Armonk, NY; London: M.E. Sharpe, 2007. ISBN 978-0-7656-0521-4.
- Anthology of Russian Short Stories from Classical to Modern. Comp. by Galina Bazhanova. Trans. from the Russian. 2 vols. Moscow: Raduga Pub.; London & Wellingborough: Collets, 1985. ISBN 5-05-000009-2. | Vol. 1 | Vol. 2.
- An Anthology of Russian Women's Writing, 1777–1992. Ed. by Catriona Kelly. Oxford: Oxford University Press, 1994. ISBN 9780198715054.
- A Bilingual Collection of Russian Short Stories. Ed. with introd. by Maurice Friedberg. 2 vols. New York: Random House, 1964–65.
- The Blue Lagoon Anthology of Modern Russian Poetry, Ed. by Konstantin K. Kuzminsky and Gregory L. Kovalev; Institute of Modern Russian Culture at Blue Lagoon, Texas. [5 vols., 9 books.] Newtonville, Ma: Oriental Research Partners, 1980–1986.
- A Survey of Russian Literature, with Selections by Isabel Florence Hapgood
- The Literature of Eighteenth-Century Russia: An Anthology of Russian Literary Materials of the Age of Classicism and the Enlightenment from the Reign of Peter the Great, 1689–1725, to the Reign of Alexander I, 1801–1825. 2 vols. Ed. and trans. by Harold B. Segel. New York: E. P. Dutton & Co., 1967.
- Mass Culture in Soviet Russia: Tales, Poems, Songs, Movies, Plays, and Folklore, 1917–1953. Ed. by James von Geldern and Richard Stites. Bloomington, In.: Indiana University Press, 1995. ISBN 0-253-20969-2.
- Masterpieces of the Russian drama. Selec. and ed. with introd. by George Rapall Noyes. 2 vols. New York: Dover Pub., 1960–1961 [1933]. Vol. 1 | Vol. 2.
- Medieval Russia's Epics, Chronicles, and Tales. Ed., trans. with introd. by Serge A. Zenkovsky. Rev. ed. New York: E. P. Dutton & Co., 1974 [1963].
- A Night in the Nabokov Hotel: 20 Contemporary Poets from Russia. Introd. and trans. by Anatoly Kudryavitsky. Dublin: Dedalus Press, 2006. ISBN 1-904556-55-8.
- The Penguin Book of Russian Verse. Introd. and ed. by Dimitri Obolensky. Rev. ed. London: Penguin Books, 1965 [1962].
- Post-war Russian Poetry. Ed. with introd. by Daniel Weissbort. London: Penguin Books, 1974. ISBN 0-14-042183-1.
- Russian Poetry under the Tsars: An Anthology. Comp. and trans. by Burton Raffel. Albany, NY: SUNY Press, 1971. ISBN 978-0-8739-5070-1.
- Russian Silver Age Poetry: Texts And Contexts. Ed. by Sibelan E. S. Forrester and Martha M. F. Kelly. Boston, Mi: Academic Studies Press, 2015. ISBN 978-1-6181-1370-2.
- The Silver Age of Russian Culture: An Anthology. Ed. by Carl and Ellendea Proffer. Ann Arbor, Mi: Ardis, 1975. ISBN 978-0-8823-3171-3.
- Third Wave: The New Russian Poetry. Ed. by Kent Johnson and Stephen M. Ashby. Introd. by Andrew Wachtel and Alexei Parshchikov. Afterword by Mikhail Epstein. Ann Arbor, Mi: University of Michigan Press, 1992. ISBN 0-472-06415-0.
- Two Centuries of Russian Verse: An Anthology from Lomonosov to Voznesensky. Ed. with introd. by Avrahm Yarmolinsky. Trans. from Russian by Babette Deutsch. New York: Random House, 1966.
- Unknown Russian Theater: An Anthology. Ed. and trans. by Michael Green and Jerome Katsell. Vol. 1. Ann Arbor, Mi: Ardis, 1991. ISBN 978-0-8823-3554-4.
- Utopias: Russian Modernist Texts, 1905—1940. Ed. and trans. by Catriona Kelly. London: Penguin Books, 1999.
- War & Peace: Contemporary Russian Prose. Glas New Russian Writing, 40. Moscow: Glas, 2006. Ed. by Natasha Perova and Joanne Turnbull. Trans. by Joanne Turnbull. ISBN 978-5-7172-0074-5.
- Worlds Apart: An Anthology of Russian Fantasy and Science Fiction. Ed. and comm. by Alexander Levitsky. Trans. by Alexander Levitsky and Martha T. Kitchen. New York: Duckworth Overlook, 2007. ISBN 978-1-5856-7819-8.
- Во Весь Голос [In a Loud Voice]: Soviet Poetry [in Russian with English Notes & Voc]. Ed. by Vladimir Ognev. Moscow: Progress Pub., 1965.
