= Alexander Mirzayan =

Russian musician and writer (born 1945)

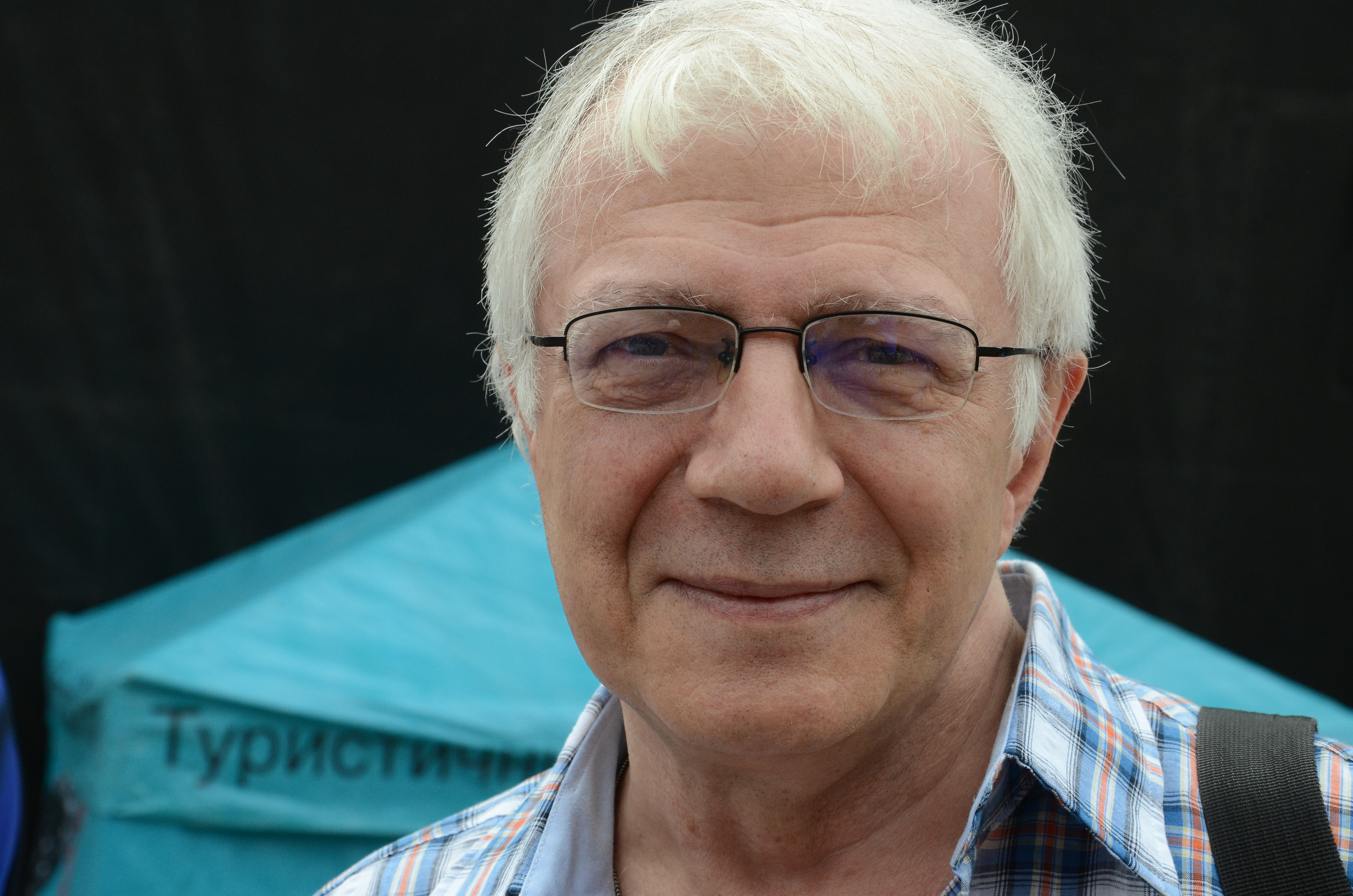
Alexander Mirzayan

Alexander Zavenovich Mirzayan (Russian: Александр Завенович Мирзаян) (born on July 20, 1945) is a Russian poet, composer, songwriter, bard and bard music theoretician. He was born in Baku. In 1969 he graduated from Bauman Moscow State Technical University and worked as a physics engineer in the Moscow Institute for Theoretical and Experimental Physics.

His first songs were written in 1969. From 1970 he started to participate in the Moscow KSP (Klub Samodejatel'noj Pesni, Clubs of Amateur Song) activities. Mirzayan became laureate of numerous KSP festivals at that time. In 1970–1980, Mirzayan's active civil stand and his affinity to the underground culture (poetry of Daniil Kharms, Joseph Brodsky etc.) caused conflicts with official rule.

Mirzayan writes songs both for his own poetry as well as poetry of other Russian poets Sosnora, Brodsky, Harms, Tsvetaeva, Chuhonzev and others. From the end of 1990, Mirzayan started research on the historical and philosophical aspects of the song phenomena.
