= Polina Dashkova =

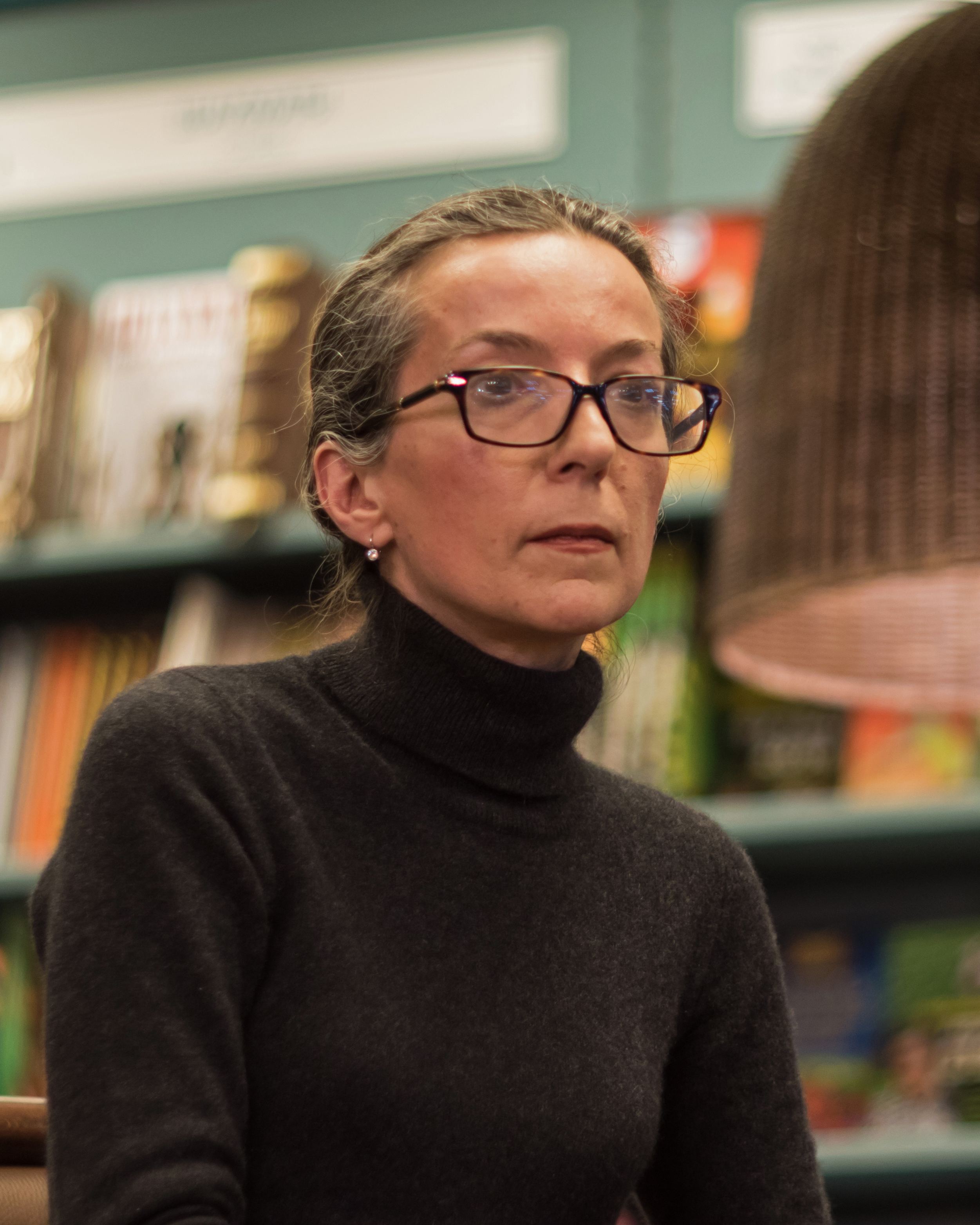
- Dashokva in February 2015
- Born: Tatyana Viktorovna Polyachenko; 14 July 1960 (age 66); Moscow, Soviet Union
- Education: Maxim Gorky Literature Institute
- Polina Dashkova's voice Dashkova on the Echo of Moscow program, 6 December 2007

Polina Dashkova (born 14 July 1960) is a Russian crime novelist.

== Life ==
Dashkova was born in Moscow in 1960. She was educated at the Maxim Gorky Literature Institute and then she worked as a journalist and as a translator from English. Her first novel was published in 1996. Since then she has published a series of books which are based upon the recent time of changes in Russia. She has sold over 40 million books.

She has sold 300,000 books in Germany and she won the Krimipreis crime award from Radio Bremen in 2006. At least a dozen of her books have been translated into German. A few of her books have been translated into Chinese, Dutch, French, German, Polish, Spanish.

In 2018 she was identified as one of the most popular women crime writers in Russia together with Darya Dontsova, Alexandra Marinina and Tatyana Ustinova beating many other living writers.

== Works ==
Russian Title	Publication Date	German Title	Translator	Publication Date	English Translation of Title
Кровь нерождённых	1996	Lenas Flucht	Helmut Ettinger	2004	Lena's Flight
Место под солнцем	1999	Club Kalaschnikow	Margret Fieseler	2002	Club Kalaschnikov
Золотой песок	1999	Für Nikita	Ganna-Maria Braungardt	2004	Golden Sand
Чеченская марионетка, или Продажные твари	2000				Chechen Marionette
Питомник	2000	Das Haus der bösen Mädchen	Ganna-Maria Braungardt	2006	Nursery
Эфирное время	2000	Russische Orchidee	Margret Fieseler	2003	A Russian Orchid
Образ врага	2000				
Лёгкие шаги безумия	2000	Die leichten Schritte des Wahnsinns	Margret Fieseler	2002	Madness Treads Lightly
Никто не заплачет	1998	Keiner wird weinen	Ganna-Maria Braungardt	2007	No One Will Cry
Чувство реальности	2002				
Херувим	2003	Der falsche Engel	Hanna-Maria Braungardt	2007	Cherubim
Качели	2003				
Исполнитель	2003	Du wirst mich nie verraten	Helmut Ettinger	2005	You Will Never Betray Me
Приз	2004				
Игра во мнения	2005	Nummer 5 hat keine Chance	Margret Fieseler	2005	
Вечная ночь	2006	In ewiger Nacht	Hanna-Maria Braungardt	2011	Eternal Night
Источник счастья	2007	Bis in alle Ewigkeit	Hanna-Maria Braungardt	2012	The Source of Happiness
Источник счастья. Книга 2. Misterium Tremendum. Тайна, приводящая в трепет	2008				
Источник счастья. Книга 3. Небо над бездной	2009				
Точка невозврата	2010				
Пакт	2012				The Pact
Соотношение сил	2015				
