= Anatoly Shteiger =

Russian author

- Анатолий Штейгер
- Shteiger in a sanatorium, 1930s
- Born: 7 July [O.S. 20 July] 1907; Nikolayevka, Kiev Governorate, Russian Empire (now Cherkasy Oblast, Ukraine)
- Died: 24 October 1944 (aged 37); Leysin, Switzerland
- Citizenship: Russian Empire; Switzerland
- Writing career
- Genre: poetry

Baron Anatoly Sergeyevich Shteiger (Russian: Анато́лий Серге́евич Ште́йгер; July 20, 1907 – October 24, 1944) was a Russian poet, one of the most significant poets of the first wave of emigration. Poems, while preserving the author’s individuality, to a large extent express the aesthetics of the Parisian note.

== Biography ==
Descended from an old Swiss family, Shteiger was born to Sergei Shteiger (1868–1937), a country leader, leader of the nobility of Kanevsky District, and deputy to the IV State Duma (1913).

He had two sisters, one of whom Alla (in Golovina marriage) was a poet known in Russian abroad. The family emigrated to Constantinople in 1920, later Shteiger lived in Czechoslovakia, France and (from 1931) Switzerland. During World War II he was passively involved in the Resistance, and wrote anti-Nazi pamphlets. The Nazi authorities in the areas bordering on Switzerland even appointed an award for his head.

== Creation ==
An important literary and human document is the extensive correspondence of Shteiger and Marina Tsvetaeva (a personal meeting between them took place only once). Steiger is the addressee of Tsvetaeva's poetic cycle Poems to the Orphan (August–September 1936).

The author of collections of poems This Day (1928), This Life (1931), Ingratitude )1936); the final collection Twice Two Four was published posthumously (1950; under the same name, the most complete collection of poems in New York was published in 1981). He gained fame mainly as one of the representatives of the so-called Paris Note, the literary movement in the poetry of the Russian Diaspora, which existed in the 1930s. The work of Steiger was promoted by the literary critic Georgy Adamovich spiritually close to him. In poetry, marked by the influence of Mikhail Kuzmin, Georgy Ivanov, Adamovich, but at the same time deeply individual, lyrical miniature dominates (one or several stanzas, often with an additional super schematic last line), motives of loneliness, nostalgia, fragility the world, foreboding of death. In the metric, he mainly developed classical sizes, also used a 3-ic dolly.

== Death ==
Since childhood, he was sick with severe tuberculosis, from which he died at the age of 37 years.
