= Valery Popov (writer) =

Russian writer

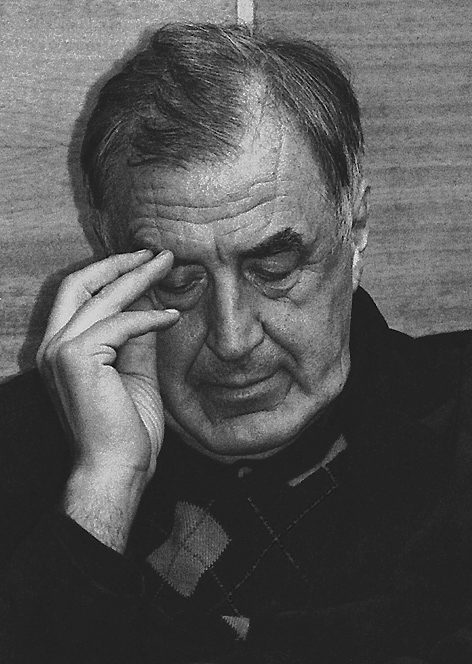

Valery Georgievich Popov (Russian: Валерий Георгиевич Попов) (born December 8, 1939) is a Russian writer, "one of the leading representatives of the Leningrad school of fiction." He has written about twenty books for adults and children as well as poems and screenplays.

Born in Kazan into the family of a biologist, he graduated from Saint Petersburg State Electrotechnical University in 1963 and worked as an engineer until 1969; in 1970 he graduated from the Gerasimov Institute of Cinematography. His first story was published in 1963 and his first collection, Yuzhnee, chem prezhde ("Further south than before") in 1969. During this period he was, along with Sergei Dovlatov, in a "group of aspiring young writers called Gorozhane (The Townsmen) — a group that included Vladimir Maramzin, Valery Popov, Boris Vakhtin, and Igor Yefimov." Jekaterina Young writes of these early stories:

The emphasis is upon the narrator's complex reactions and the construction of a world that is unusual and even absurd. The events narrated appear random; the author is not concerned to tell a story about a specific character. He is more interested in the intonation and rhythmic precision of his stories, almost all of which are first-person narratives.

His later works, "depicting surreal post-Soviet life, such as Days in the Harem (1994) and She-rascal (1996), utilize elements of the picaresque novel." He has also written a biography (2010) of his friend Dovlatov.
