= Andrey Dashkov =

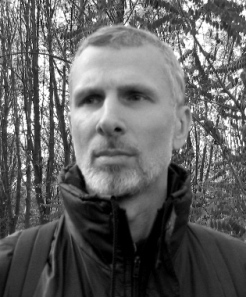
- Born: Andrey Georgievich Dashkov; 28 January 1965 (age 61); Kharkiv, Ukrainian SSR
- Occupations: Novelist, short-story writer
- Writing career
- Genres: dark fantasy, horror fiction, mystic thriller, anti-utopia
- Notable works: "Die Or Disappear!", "Necromancers Wars"
- Website: dashkov.at.ua

Andrey Dashkov (Russian: Андрей Дашков; born Andrey Georgievich Dashkov, Russian: Андрей Георгиевич Дашков; 28 January 1965) is a contemporary horror fiction writer which resides in Kharkiv, Ukraine, and writes in Russian. Genre of Dashkov's first novels may be defined as dark fantasy. His last novels and short stories usually carry the outward conventions of the horror fiction genre, but include elements of dystopia and mysticism.

== Andrey Dashkov bio ==
Andrey Georgievich Dashkov (Андрей Георгиевич Дашков) was born 28 January 1965, in Kharkiv, Soviet Ukraine. He graduated from Kharkiv Aviation Institute (1988). After the service in the Soviet Armed Forces (1988–1990) he worked at a research institute. Dashkov published his first dark fantasy novel The Apostate in 1993, thus beginning his career as a professional writer. Since 2006 he is engaged exclusively in the literature.

== Bibliography ==
Novels

- 1993 The Apostate (Russian: "Отступник")
- 1994 Hell Star (Russian: "Звезда ада")
- 1995 Viperling (Russian: "Змееныш")
- 1996 The Disfigured (Russian: "Обезображенный")
- 1996 The Deceived (Russian: "Обманутый")
- 1996 The Servant of Werewolves (Russian: "Слуга оборотней")
- 1996 Die Or Disappear! (Russian: "Умри или исчезни!")
- 1997 Necromancers Wars (Russian: "Войны некромантов")
- 1997 Paranoia Doors (Russian: "Двери паранойи")
- 1998 The Pale Horseman, Black Jack (Russian: "Бледный всадник, Черный Валет")
- 1999 Lost Light (Russian: "Утраченный свет")
- 2000 Hurricane Eye (Russian: "Глаз урагана")
- 2001 The Collector of Bones (Russian: "Собиратель костей")
- 2001 Superanimal (Russian: "Суперанимал")
- 2003 The Dragon (Russian: "Дракон")
- 2010 Lazarus, or Journey of Destined To Die (Russian: "Лазарь, или Путешествие смертника")(audiobook)
- 2011 Figment of imagination (Russian: "Плод воображения")
- 2012 Midnight Sun. New Era (Russian: "Солнце полуночи. Новая эра")
- 2012 Wandering Of Senor (Russian: "Странствие Сенора")
