= Dmitry Avaliani =

Soviet poet (1938–2003)

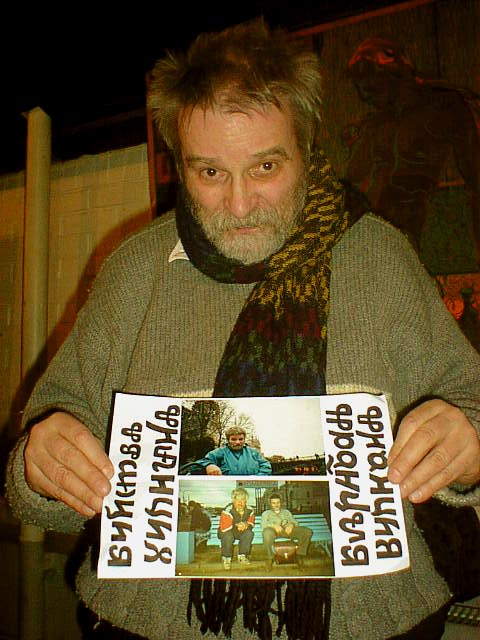
Dmitry Avaliani

Dmitry Avaliani (Georgian: დიმიტრი ევგენის-ძე ავალიანი; Russian: Дми́трий Евге́ньевич Авалиа́ни, IPA: [ˈdmʲitrʲɪj jɪvˈɡʲenʲjɪvʲɪtɕ ɐvəlʲɪˈanʲɪ]; 6 August 1938 – 19 December 2003) was a Russian poet and palindromist, who made "important" contributions to Russian visual poetry. He invented and perfected the Russian ambigram, called listoverten' (Russian: листовертень; could be loosely translated as rotate-page). This is a short text (usually just a few words) written so that after rotating 90° or 180° it is legible as a different text, or sometimes the same. Sometimes the two texts together make up one idea, and rhyme. He was especially interested in pantorhyme, anagram and other especially difficult ways of rhyming.
