= Vladimir Uflyand =

Russian poet (1937–2007)

Vladimir Iosifovich Uflyand (Russian: Владимир Иосифович Уфлянд; 1937–2007) was a Russian poet, famous for such poems as It has For Ages Been Observed; Now, At Last, Even Nikifor's A Suitor; The Peasant; and The Working Week Comes To An End.

Vladimir Uflyand was born in Leningrad (now St. Petersburg). He studied history at Leningrad State University, and later worked as a labourer and as a stoker. His poems circulated in samizdat, and he also published his poems for children in Soviet periodicals. His poetry for adults was first published in a book form in the USA in 1978, titled Texts 1955–1977. In 1993, his collection, Poems and Texts, was published in St. Petersburg. Two more poetry books followed in 1995 and in 1997. In 2000, a book of his essays was published in St. Petersburg.
