= Pavel Ulitin =

Russian writer (1918–1986)

- Павел Павлович Улитин
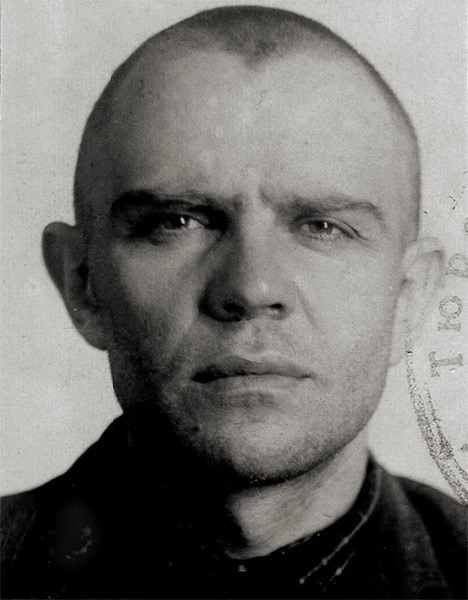
- Born: 31 May 1918; Rostov Oblast, Russian SFSR
- Died: 24 May 1986 (aged 67); Moscow, Russia
- Citizenship: Soviet Russia (1918–22); Soviet Union (1922–86)
- Education: IFLI
- Writing career
- Literary movement: Stream of consciousness

Pavel Pavlovich Ulitin (Russian: Павел Павлович Улитин; 31 May 1918 – 24 of May 1986) was a Russian underground writer.

== Life ==
Ulitin was born in Migulinsky, a Cossack village located on the Don. His father was a surveyor murdered in 1921 by White Army bandits. His mother was a doctor and highly educated, having completed the most advanced courses then available to women in St. Petersburg. After finishing primary school, Ulitin entered the Moscow Institute of Philosophy, Literature, and History (IFLI), where he and his friends organized an anti-Stalin Communist club. This led to his arrest in 1938. Sixteen months later he was released due to poor health. The injuries he received during his imprisonment left him permanently disabled.

At the end of the Second World War, Ulitin returned to Moscow and began correspondence studies at the Moscow State Linguistic University. In 1951 he attempted to seek asylum in the United States embassy, but was arrested and committed to the Leningrad Prison Psychiatric Hospital, where he remained until 1954. He returned to his hometown, then went back to Moscow. In 1957 he completed his correspondence studies. He supported himself by teaching English and working as a clerk in a bookstore. He died in Moscow in 1986.

== Work ==
Ulitin's early works were lost after his arrest. It is known that the manuscript of a novel was confiscated following his arrest in 1951, as were further writings following a search of his home in 1962. Inspired by the techniques of James Joyce, Ulitin created his own style, in which a 'concealed subject' is gradually created by the interlacing of a stream of consciousness, recollections of the narrator, quotations (many in foreign languages), scraps of dialogue, and monologues by incidental characters.

Within the Soviet Union, Ulitin's works were distributed through the samizdat. Beginning in 1976, thanks to the advocacy of Zinovy Zinik, his works began to appear in émigré periodicals. The first post-Soviet publication of his works took place in the 1990s, and three more have been published since 2000 by Ivan Akhmetev. However, the greater part of Ulitin's oeuvre remains unpublished.

== Bibliography ==
- Immortality in the pocket // Syntax. - 1992. - No. 32.
- Photograph of The Machine Gunner // The Herald of New Literature. - 1993. - No. 5.
- Float // Banner. - 1996. - No. 11.
- Gates of the Caucasus // Mitin Journal. - 2002. - No. 60.
- Conversation About the Fish. - M.: Haugs, 2002. - 208 s.
- Makarov Combs the Back of his Head. - M.: New publishing house, 2004. - 172 s.
- Hopeless Journey. - M.: New publishing house, 2006. - 205 s.
