= Valentin Ovechkin =

Soviet writer (1904–1968)

- Born: 22 June 1904; Taganrog, Russian Empire
- Died: 27 January 1968 (aged 63); Tashkent, Soviet Union

Valentin Vladimirovich Ovechkin (Russian: Валентин Владимирович Овечкин; 22 June 1904 – 27 January 1968) was a Soviet writer, playwright and journalist.

== Early life ==
Valentin was born in Taganrog, the son of an office employee. He studied at the Taganrog Technical School from 1913 to 1919. He began writing early, while he was still a member of the Komsomol. His first story Saveliev was published in the newspaper Bednota (The Poor) in 1927. Other early works appeared in provincial papers. He stopped writing for several years and worked as a chairman of an agricultural commune on the Don River, and later in Kuban. In 1934 he became a traveling correspondent for the newspapers Molot (Hammer) and Kolkhoznaya Pravda, both published in Rostov-on-Don, and for newspapers in Armavir and Krasnodar.

== Career ==
His first book Kolkhoz Stories was published in Rostov-on-Don in 1935. His second collection was published in Krasnodar in 1938. In 1939 his work began to appear in the Moscow magazine Krasnaya Nov, including the novellas Guests in Stukachi, Praskovia Maximovna, and the sketch Without Kith or Kin. At the outbreak of World War II, he was mobilized and sent to work as a front-line agitator and correspondent on the Crimean and Southern fronts, and later to Stalingrad and Ukraine. In 1945, the May issue of the magazine Oktyabr published his novella Greetings from the Front, which was given a wide response in the press.

Valentin was connected with the Village Prose movement, and the majority of his works deal with life on rural collective farms, though his most popular work, the novella Greetings from the Front focused on the war. The writer Sergey Zalygin gave the following assessment of Ovechkin in the January 1956 issue of Novy Mir:

"Valentin Ovechkin has a number of followers. I think that among the very active and quite numerous group of writers, predominantly young, who write about the village, there are many whom Ovechkin has helped to find the way. I myself owe him a great deal. I think that much of my work would not have been written were it not for his stories."

His sketches and stories of collective farm life gathered in the collection District Routine (1952–56), while loyal to the official party line, often expose managerial inefficiency, the self-interest of party functionaries, and other shortcomings in the rural Soviet Union.

He gave a speech at the 1954 All-Union Writers Congress, criticizing the main address by Alexey Surkov, who spoke on "the conditions and tasks of Soviet literature". Ovechkin commented on the mediocrity of much of Soviet literature, and on the "system of awarding Stalin Prizes", which was done hastily and without regard for the opinions of the reading public. His speech produced a strong effect on the delegates, and found further support in the speech by Mikhail Sholokhov that followed. Ovechkin gave another critical speech at the 1955 Congress. His well-meant criticism went unheeded, shrugged off by reviewers as relating to the past only, and his deep disappointment led to a nervous breakdown and suicide attempt. In October 1955, Liu Binyan, a Chinese author, acted as the interpreter for him when he visited China. Ovechkin later tried to help Liu Binyan, who emulated Ovechkin's works and was prosecuted by Chinese Communist Party by writing a letter to Zhou Enlai.

Ovechkin is also the author of the plays Nastia Kolosova (1949), To Meet the Wind (1958), Summer Showers (1959), and A Time to Reap (1960), as well as numerous sketches and essays. From 1963 he lived in Tashkent, where he worked on the autobiographical cycle Uninvented Sketches (published 1972), which he never finished.

== Awards and honors ==
- Two Orders of the Red Banner of Labour (1954, 1964)

== English translations ==
- Greetings From The Front, Foreign Languages Publishing House, 1947.
- Collective Farm Sidelights: Short Stories, Foreign Languages Publishing House, 1954.
