= Victor Sosnora =

Russian writer (1936–2019)

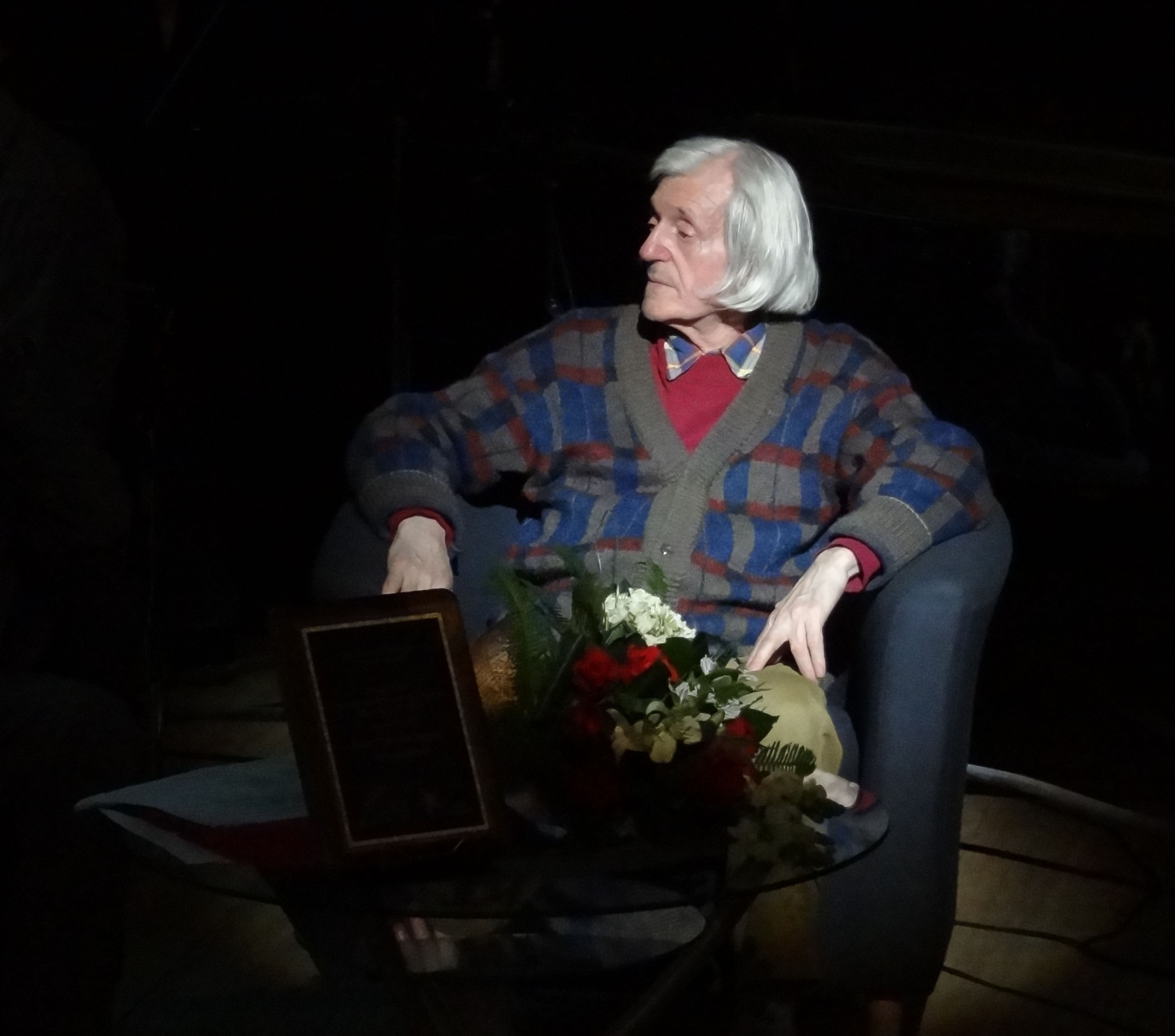

Victor Aleksandrovich Sosnora (Russian: Виктор Александрович Соснора; 28 April 1936, Alupka – 13 July 2019, St. Petersburg) was a Russian poet, writer and playwright. He is considered one of the most important representatives of the Sixtiers and the Leningrad/Petersburg school.

== Biography ==
Sosnora was born into a family of Leningrad circus performers who just then there were on tour: Alexander Ivanovich Sosnora (1908–1959) and Eva (Chava) Wulfovna Gorowatzkaja (1914–1990). His grandfather was a rabbi in Vitebsk Wulf Gorowatzkij. His parents separated when he was a child; so he grew up alone with his mother on. During the Siege of Leningrad 1941-1942 he was in Leningrad and was rescued on the road of life from the besieged city. He found himself in the occupied Ukraine again, where he - lived among partisans, who led his uncle to capture by the Gestapo. The uncle and the other guerrillas were killed under the eyes of Wiktor. Later he was found by his father again, who commanded a Polish unit at this time; with him he saw the end of the war in Frankfurt an der Oder. With only nine years he learned to shoot. The school he visited after the war in Warsaw, where his father served under Marshal Konstantin Rokossovsky, and in Arkhangelsk, Makhachkala and Lviv. He finished school in Lviv, and returned later to Leningrad back, started a - not completed - studies at the Philosophical Faculty of the Leningrad University, served from 1955 to 1958 in the Army on Novaya Zemlya, where he was contaminated during nuclear explosions. 1958-1963 he worked as a welder and electrician at a factory in Leningrad and studied simultaneously in studies at the philological faculty. 1962 he published his first book. On the one hand, he published texts in official Soviet publishing houses, his lyrics were printed but also in Samizdat and Tamisdat. Sosnora was the only representative of the official Schestidesjatniki in Leningrad and often traveled abroad - so he held guest lectures in Paris and in the United States, Vincennes and in Wroclaw. his poems were officially printed for the first time in the Soviet Union in 1989. In recent years it takes for health reasons at any public events longer participate. Sosnora lived in St. Petersburg. where he died on July 13, 2019.
