= Shanghai Art Museum (1956) =

Museum in Shanghai, China

Coordinates: 31.2326°N 121.4665°E

Former Shanghai Art Museum building
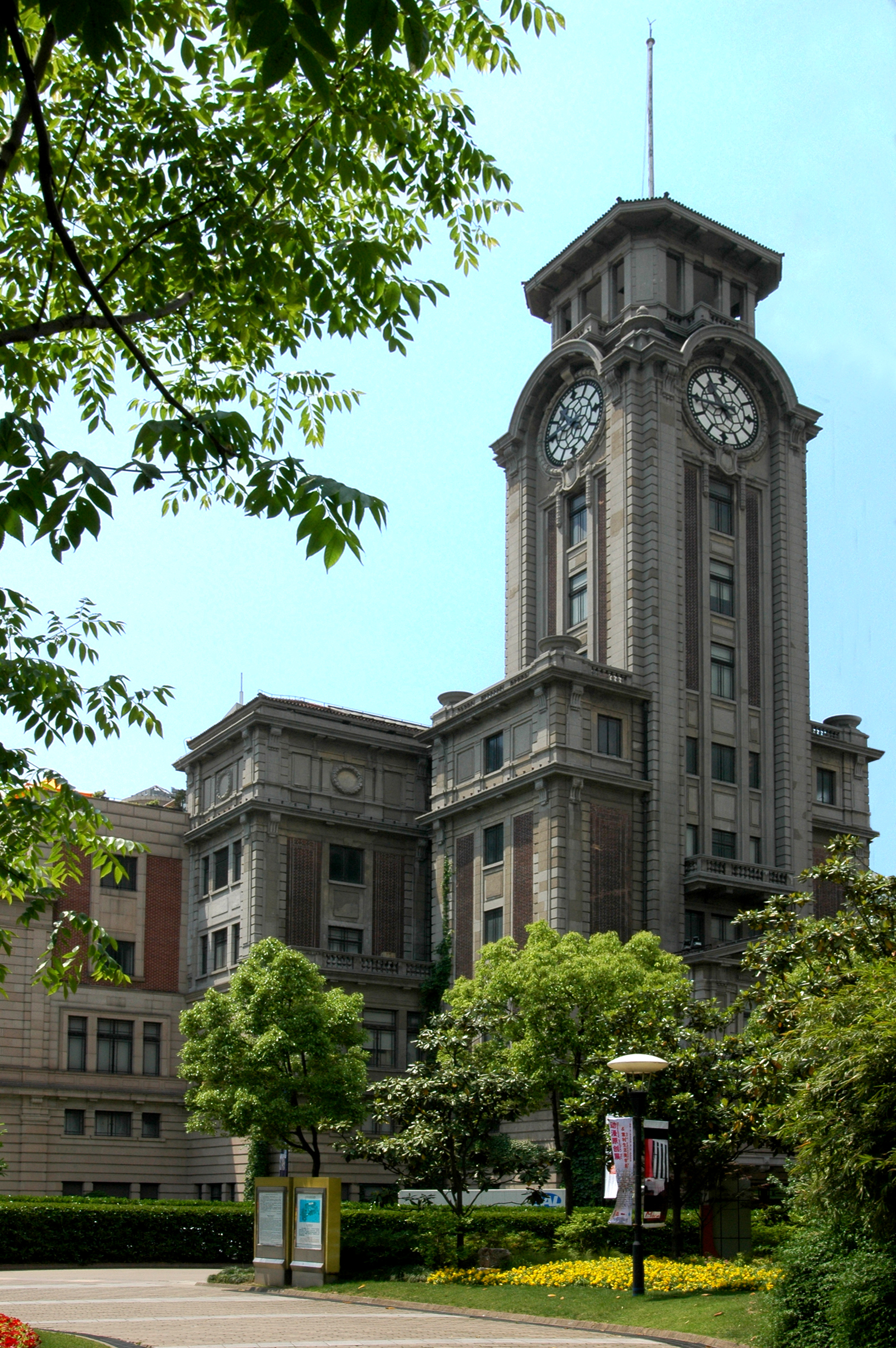
- Location: 325 West Nanjing Road, Shanghai, China

Shanghai Art Museum
- Simplified Chinese: 上海美术馆
- Traditional Chinese: 上海美術館
Transcriptions
Standard Mandarin
- Hanyu Pinyin: Shànghǎi Měishùguǎn

The Shanghai Art Museum (Chinese: 上海美术馆) was an art museum in the city of Shanghai, China. In October 2012, the museum was rebranded as the China Art Museum when it moved to the China pavilion at Expo 2010 on the former Shanghai Expo 2010 lands. The Shanghai Art Museum building is the former clubhouse building of the Shanghai Race Club. It sits on the western edge of People's Park, north of People's Square, which was once the Shanghai race course. The Shanghai Art Museum was the original home of the Shanghai Biennale, founded in 1996 by Fang Zengxian, then director of the museum. The former museum building is being converted to house the Shanghai History Museum, which had been left without a home due to redevelopment since 1999.

== History of the Shanghai Art Museum building ==
The Shanghai Art Museum building is located on the south side of Nanjing Road (West). The building has an area of 2,200 sq m.

The building was constructed in 1933, as the clubhouse for the Shanghai Race Club race course. The horse race course was reputed to be the third most profitable industry during the 1930s (during the Republic of China era).

In March 1934 the new Shanghai Race Club building opened. The grandstand was thought at the time to be the largest in the world, and probably was, while the Race Club, with its marble staircases, teak-panelled rooms, oak parquet floors, and its coffee room which was 100ft by 47ft with a huge fireplace, most certainly ranked as the most sumptuous club of its kind yet built in any country.

In 1955, the building was renovated and a terrace was constructed on the roof. The goal was mainly to enable the architects to build wider stairs leading to the clock tower, so that youth can easily visit the tower.

The building has one of the most prominent clock towers in the city after the Customs House clock tower on the Bund. The clock tower at the Art Museum has historically been associated with decay and corruption in the city, as it was often inaccurate. However, it was renovated in 2006 and has been accurate since then.

== Events ==
Shanghai Art Museum was the home to the Shanghai Biennale, which started from 1996. The Shanghai Biennale is considered one of the most important cultural events in Shanghai. In 2012, the Shanghai Biennale moved to the new Power Station of Art.

== See also ==
- List of museums in China
