= Post-socialist art =

Post-socialist art or post-communist art is a term used in analysis of art arriving from post-socialist (post-communist) countries taken as different in their nature from Western, Postmodern art.

Crucial elements of Post-socialist art include:

1. Due to a lack of market, such art was Modernist in a sense of being non-commercial, but also;
2. Due to this lack of market, authorship was weakened. Authorship allowed working under pseudonyms, anonymously or even collectively. Finally;
3. Post-socialist art often referred to an inner history of art, such as Russian Avant-garde artists Kazimir Malevich and El Lissitzky.

Socialist art began opening to Western markets in the eighties, introducing Slovenian collective IRWIN, Belgrade Malevich (a.k.a. Goran Djordjevic) and artists that Peter Weibel would name "Retro-avant-garde." In the nineties, a second wave was followed by mass-funded political versions. Much of this art was financed by George Soros. This led critics such as Miško Šuvaković to draw comparisons to Socialist realism, coining the term "Soros Realism" to refer to the movement.

== Bibliography ==
- Peraica, Ana (2006). "Anonymous Artist, Nameless Heroes, Unknown Histories". In Irwin (ed.). East Art Map. London: MIT Press. pp. 63–74. ISBN 9781846380228.
- Boris Groys and M. Holein, Eds. (2004). Dream Factory Communism: The Visual Culture of the Stalin Era Traumfabrik Kommunismus: Die Visuelle Kultur der Stalinzeit, Schirn Kunsthalle Frankfurt Hatje Cantz.
- Erjavec, A. C. (2003). Postmodernism and the postsocialist condition : politicized art under late socialism. Berkeley, Calif.; London, University of California Press.
- Miško Šuvaković (January 2002) Ideologija izložbe: O ideologijama Manifeste. Platforma 2 Volume, DOI:
- Boris Groys. (1992). The total art of Stalinism: avant-garde, aesthetic dictatorship, and beyond.
- Svetla Kazalarska. 2009. Contemporary Art as Ars Memoriae: Curatorial Strategies for Challenging the Post-Communist Condition. In: Time, Memory, and Cultural Change, ed. S. Dempsey and D. Nichols, Vienna: IWM Junior Visiting Fellows' Conferences, Vol. 25.
