= Soros Realism =

Soros Realism describes a type of post-socialist art. It was coined by Miško Šuvaković in "Ideologija izložbe: o ideologijama Manifeste" (2002). The name comes from George Soros, who financed Soros centers for contemporary art in Eastern Europe.

Although Šuvaković did not originally use it pejoratively, its origin in Socialist Realism made it emblematic of the irony of renewed political funding of art, which censors by financing not forbidding.
