= Gazanevsky =

Soviet art exhibitions

The Gazanevsky art exhibitions were exhibitions of Soviet Nonconformist Art in Leningrad (St. Petersburg). They symbolize the beginning of the destruction of the socialistic realism, the most powerful artsystem of the USSR. The exhibitions defined a new stage of the existence of a Soviet underground movement. They had not only influence on the development of Russian art, but also on art worldwide.

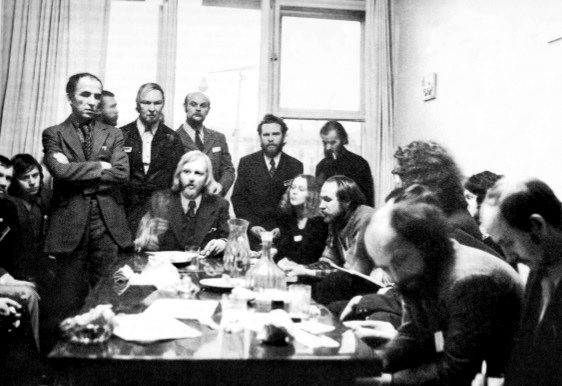
meeting of the unofficial artists in front of the exhibition

The Soviet art of the 70s lived isolated from the art world. Officially only those artist were acknowledged who were members of the "Union of the artists". Artists who weren't acknowledged were not able to sell or exhibit. By violating these prohibitions, they could be arrested and their art could be destroyed.

The first exhibition took place in the Gaza Culture Palace from 22–25 December 1974, in Leningrad (St. Petersburg).

A group of unofficial artists (Nonconformists), under the direction of Youri Jarkikh (Jarki), requested the public authorities to permit the exhibition of the artworks of unofficial artists. The public authorities were forced to allow the exhibition by the determination of the artists as well as the fear of the government of an international scandal after the Bulldozer Exhibition in Moscow. 53 artists showcased their 220 works. The exhibition lasted four days and aroused interest by many people, even though the regime blocked all information. This art event was marked by 15,000 visitors, long queues and detailed reports in foreign press.

In spite of different styles (Russian vanguard and Russian icon painting, abstract and Pop-Art, surrealism and Salon), the struggle for the right to creative expression of each individual, united the exhibition. Liberty was sensed in every work. The exhibition delivered a mighty explosion of the inner spiritual power and triggered a dissidents' consolidation.

The second exhibition of Nonconformists from Leningrad took place 1975 and secured the success of the former exhibition. From 10 to 20 September, 80 artists showed their numerous art works in the Newskij culture palace. Visitors were only permitted to walk in groups through the exhibition. The viewing for one group lasted 40 minutes. Given the large number of paintings the works could be looked at for only 6 seconds on average.

These two exhibitions carried the Nonconformism from an enclosed individual life to the public. They made a contribution to a corporate cultural movement of the artists.

Although the Gazanevsky exhibitions had legalized Nonconformism, public authorities opposed permitting presentations of the unofficial art. Repressions against artists started increasing again and many left the USSR.

Artists of the Gazanevsky exhibition include A. Arefiev (ru), A. Basin (ru), Anatoly Belkin, G. Bogomolov, Anatoly Vasiliev, L. Borisov, V. Gavrilchik, A.Gennadiev, Igor V. Ivanov, Y. Zharkikh, Vitaly Kubasov, Y. Ljukshin, Valery Mishin, V. Ovchinnikov, Y. Petrochenkov, E. Ruchin, Igor Sacharow-Ross (Sacharov-Ross, Zakharov-Ross), G. Subkow, J. Tulpanov, G. Ustyugov, B. Schagin, M. Zerusch, and others.
