= Shahpour =

Shahpour is a masculine given name of Persian origin. Notable people with the name include:

== Given name ==
- Shahpour Shahbazi (born 1961), Iranian author
- Shahpour Zarnegar (1929–2022), Iranian fencer
