= Valery Mishin =

Russian painter

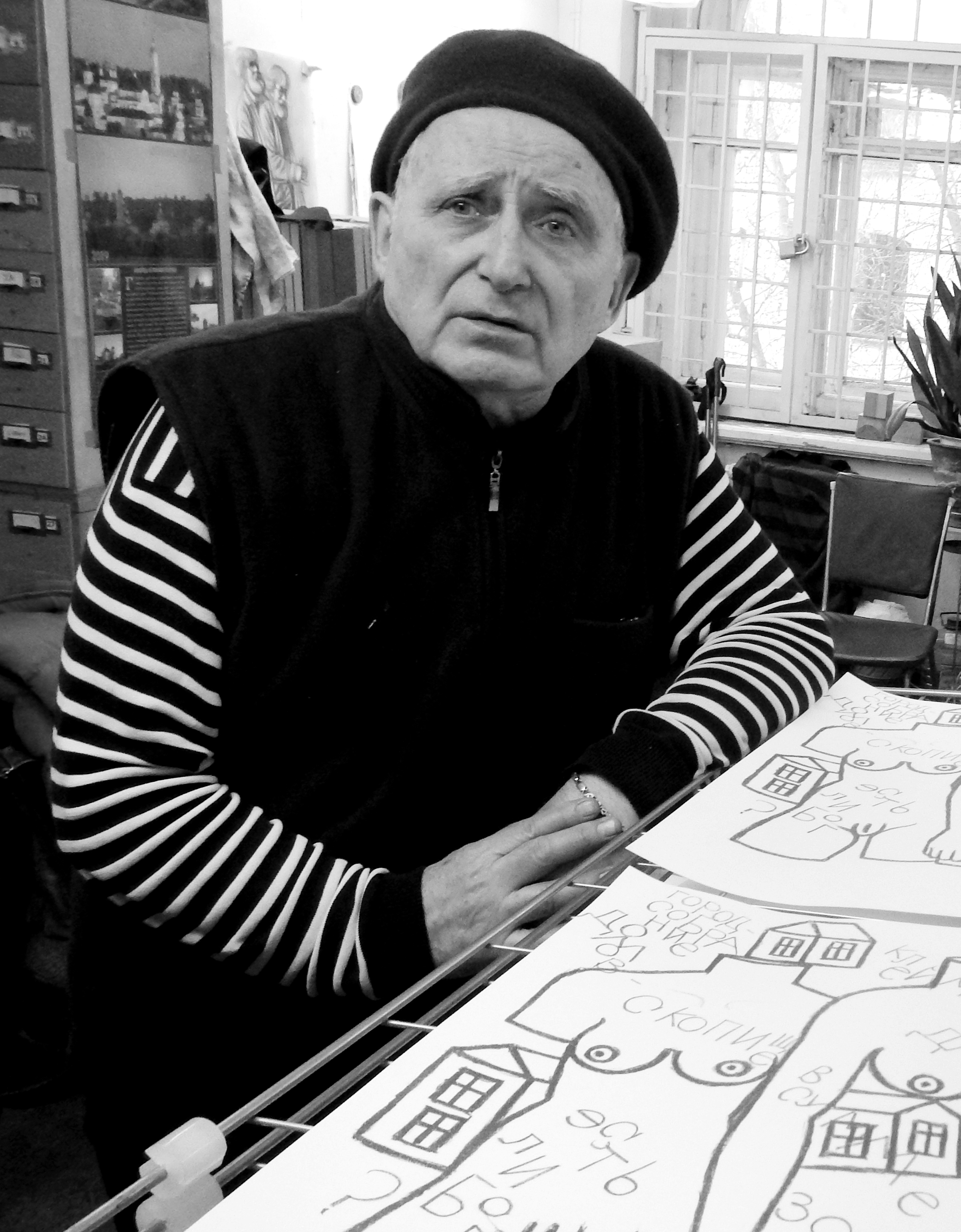
- Born: Valery Andreevich Mishin; January 14, 1939 (age 87); Simferopol, Soviet Union
- Education: Saint Petersburg Stieglitz State Academy of Art and Design
- Known for: Painting, Graphics
- Movement: arts

Valery Andreevich Mishin (Russian: Валерий Андреевич Мишин; January 14, 1939 in Simferopol, Crimea) is a Soviet and Russian painter, graphic artist, poet and writer.

== Biography ==
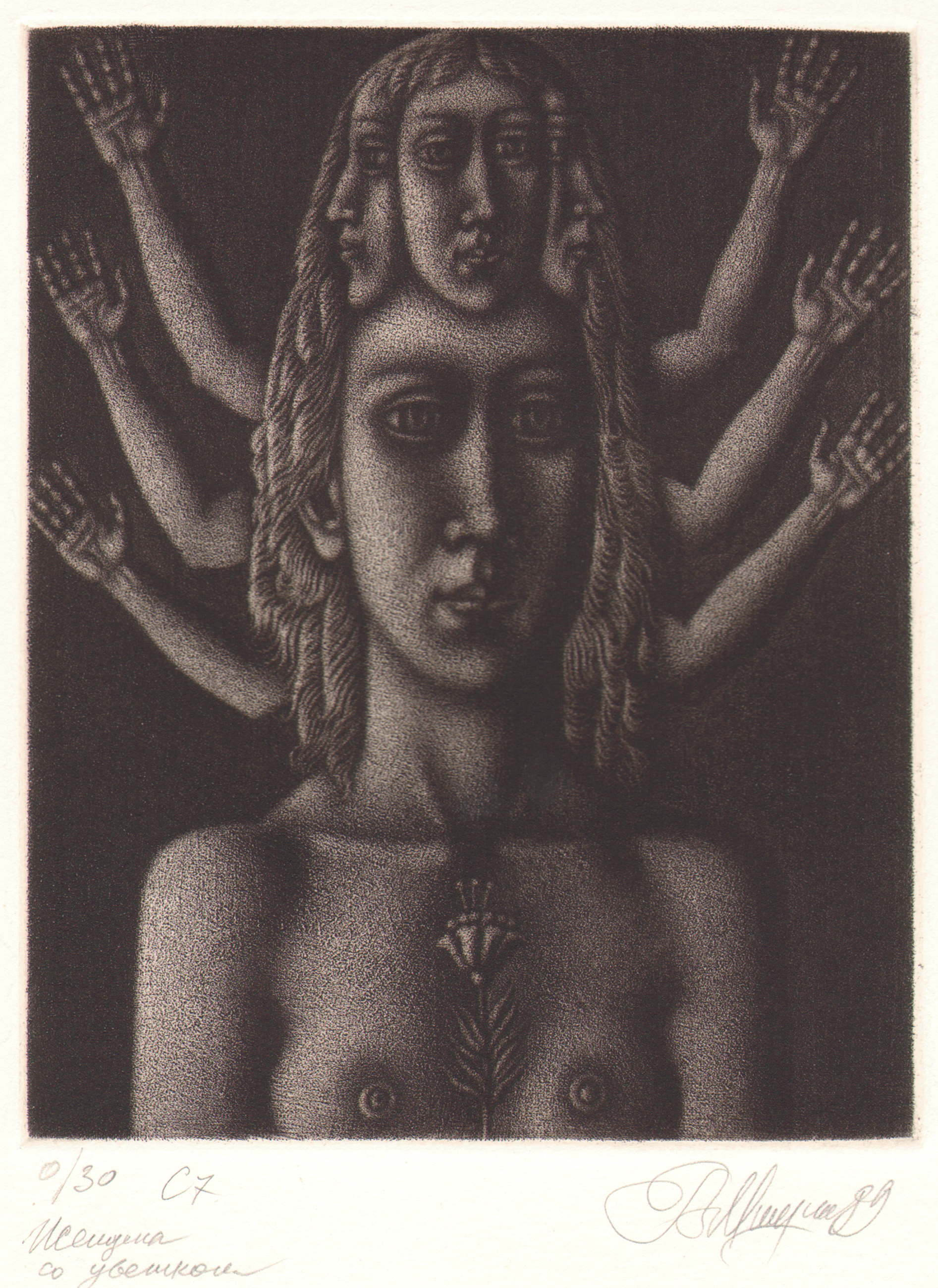
Woman with a flower. 1989, mezzotint

Painter, graphic artist and printmaker (lithography, etching, mezzotint). Graduated from Sverdlovsk Art School (1962); Department of Monumental Painting, Leningrad Higher Art School named after V.I. Mukhina (1963-1968). Member of Saint Petersburg Union of Artists, Russia; St. Petersburg Union of Writers; International Federation of UNESCO Artists. Honored Artist of the Russian Federation. Honorary Academician of the Russian Academy of Arts. Member of Lestnitsa Group (1975-2016).

Exhibitor of nonconformist artists exhibition in the Nevsky Palace of Culture (1975). Participant of more than 300 exhibitions (since 1966) in Russia and abroad: Warsaw, Ghent, London, Mainz, Mexico City, Paris, Stockholm, etc. Twenty personal exhibitions (since 1969). Was published in samizdat as a poet and writer (since 1960s). Has illustrated over 50 books. Master of bookplate. Diploma-recipient of foreign exhibitions. Project member: City as an Artist's Subjectivity (2020).

Lives and works in St. Petersburg.

== Museum collections ==
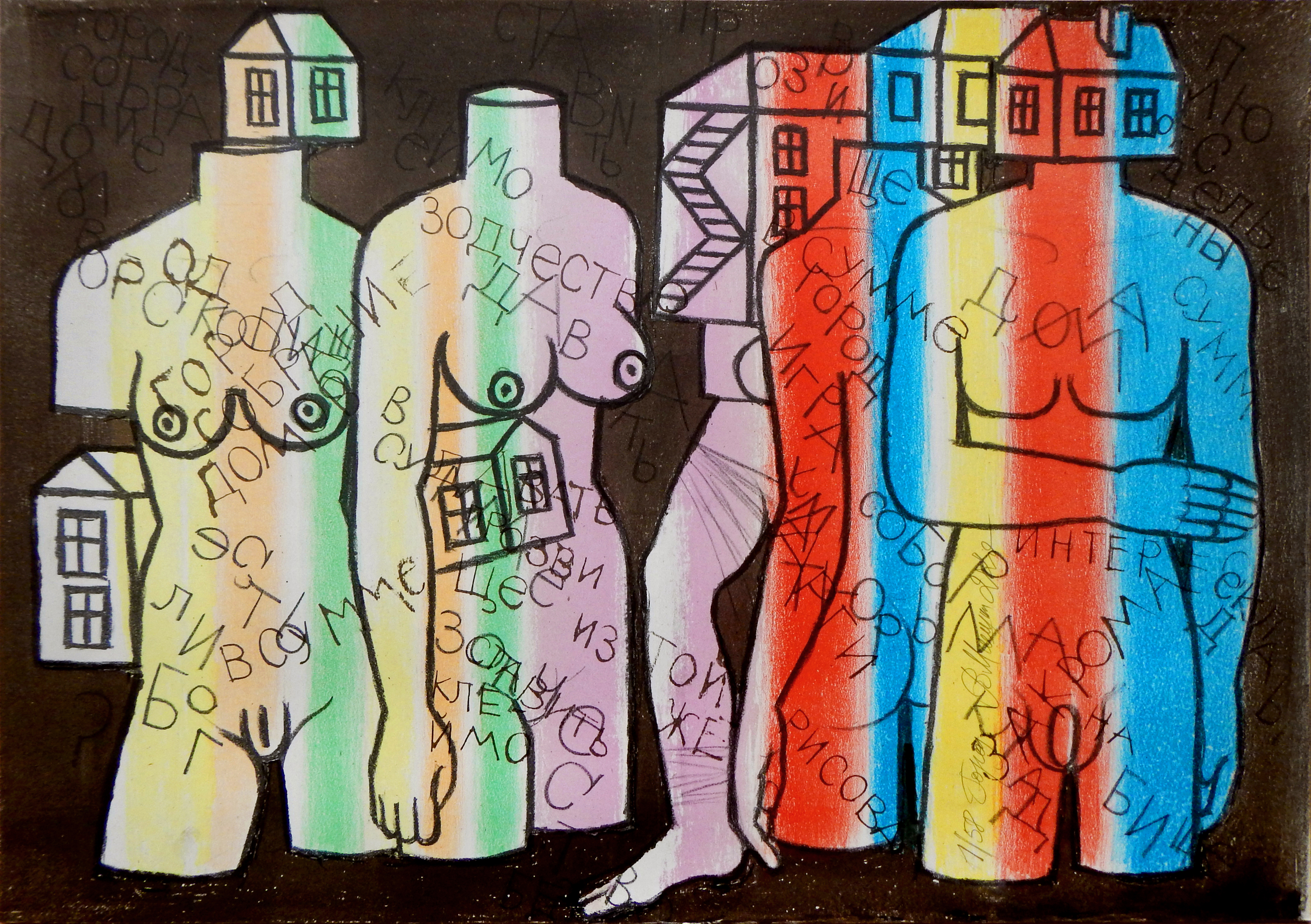
Metaphysics. No. 1/58. 2020, lithography. The Hermitage Museum. Hermitage Academic Library Collection. (For the project City as an Artist's Subjectivity)

The artist's works are in the following museum collections (about 300). State Catalogue of the Museum Fund of Russia:

- Pushkin State Museum of Fine Arts (Moscow);
- Garage Museum of Contemporary Art. (Moscow). Library/ Artist's Books Dept;
- State Hermitage Museum (St. Petersburg);
- State Russian Museum (St. Petersburg);
- MISP (the Museum of St. Petersburg Art (20th–21st centuries), (St. Petersburg);
- National Pushkin Museum (St. Petersburg);
- State Pushkin Museum (St. Petersburg);
- Dostoevsky Museum (St. Petersburg);
- State Museum of the History of Saint Petersburg;
- Museum of Modern Art, St.Petersburg State University (St. Petersburg);
- State Museum of Urban Sculpture (St. Petersburg);
- Peterhof State Museum Reserve;
- Museum of Nonconformist Art, Pushkinskaya 10 (St. Petersburg);
- Moscow Museum of Modern Art (Moscow);
- Kaliningrad State Art Gallery (Kaliningrad);
- Yekaterinburg Museum of Fine Arts. (Yekaterinburg).
- Belgian National Playing Card Museum (Turnhout, Belgium);
- Bristol Museum and Art Gallery (England);
- Zimmerli Art Museum at Rutgers University (New Brunswick, New Jersey, USA);
- Gutenberg Museum (Mainz, Germany);
- Museum House of Humor and Satire (Gabrovo, Bulgaria);
- Civic Museum of Crema (Crema, Lombardy), etc.

== Bibliography ==
- Погарский М., Лукин В. Ф. Энциклопедия Книги художника. Москва — 2022. цв. ил. — 296 с. — С. 164. ISBN 978-5-9906919-7-1
- Кононихин Н. Ленинградская школа литографии. Путь длиною в век. СПб: М. Frants Art Foundation. — 2021. — 360 с., цв. ил. ISBN 978-5-6046274-4-0
- Alexey Parygin A City as the Artist's Subjectivity // Book Arts Newsletter. — No. 140. Bristol: CFPR (Centre for Fine Print Research). University of the West of England, 2021, July — August. — P. 46-48. ISSN 1754-9086
- Печатная графика Санкт-Петербургских художников // Каталог. Авт. вст. ст.: Н. Ю. Кононихин, А. Б. Парыгин. СПб: СПб СХ. — 2020. — 192 с., цв. ил. ISBN 978-5-6043891-1-9
- City as Artist's subjectivity. Artist's book project. Catalog. Authors of the articles: Parygin A.B., Markov T.A., Klimova E.D., Borovsky A.D., Severyukhin D.Ya., Grigoryants E.I., Blagodatov N.I. (Rus & En) — Saint Petersburg: Ed. T. Markova. 2020. — 128 p. ISBN 978-5-906281-32-6

== Gallery of works ==
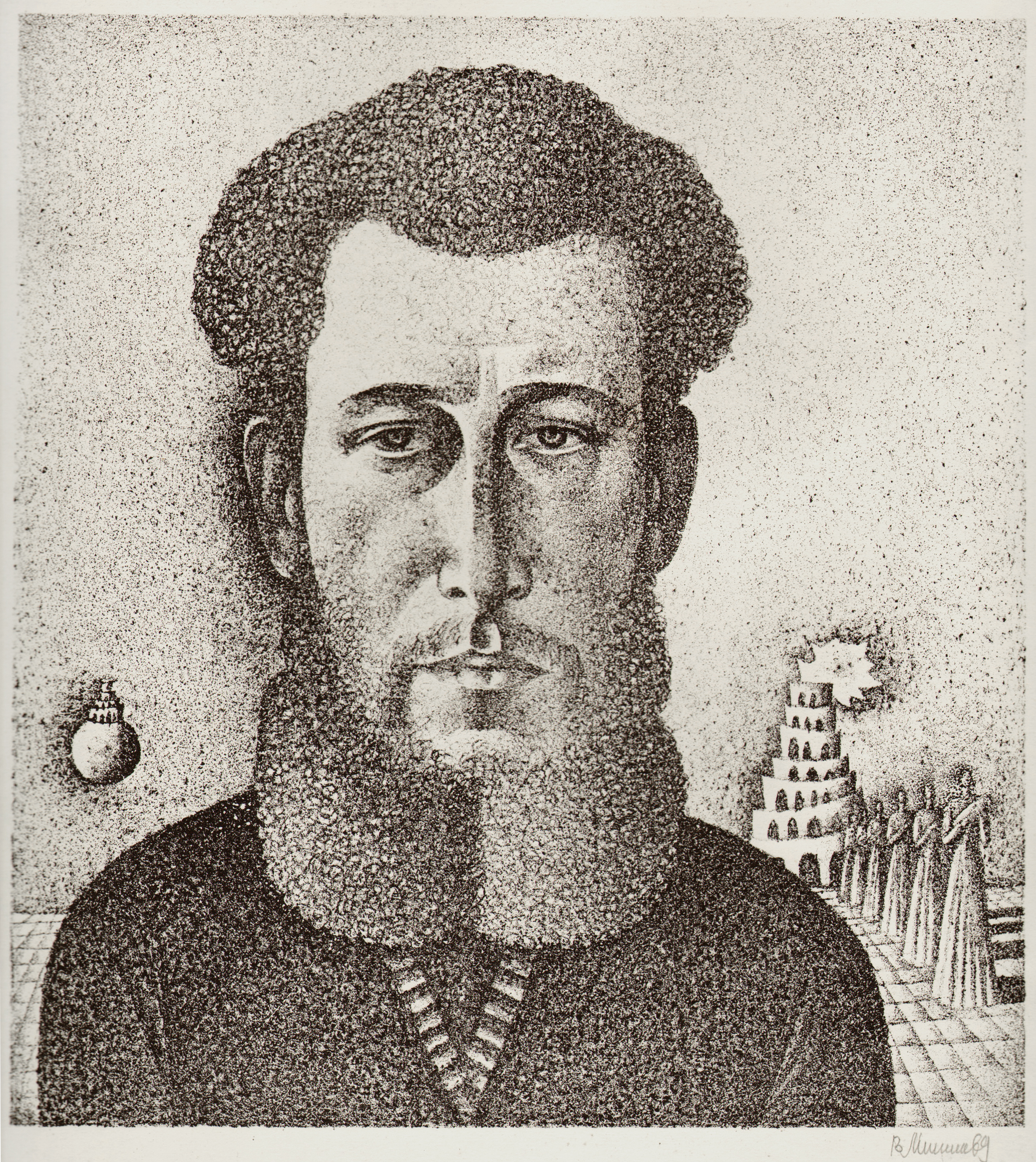

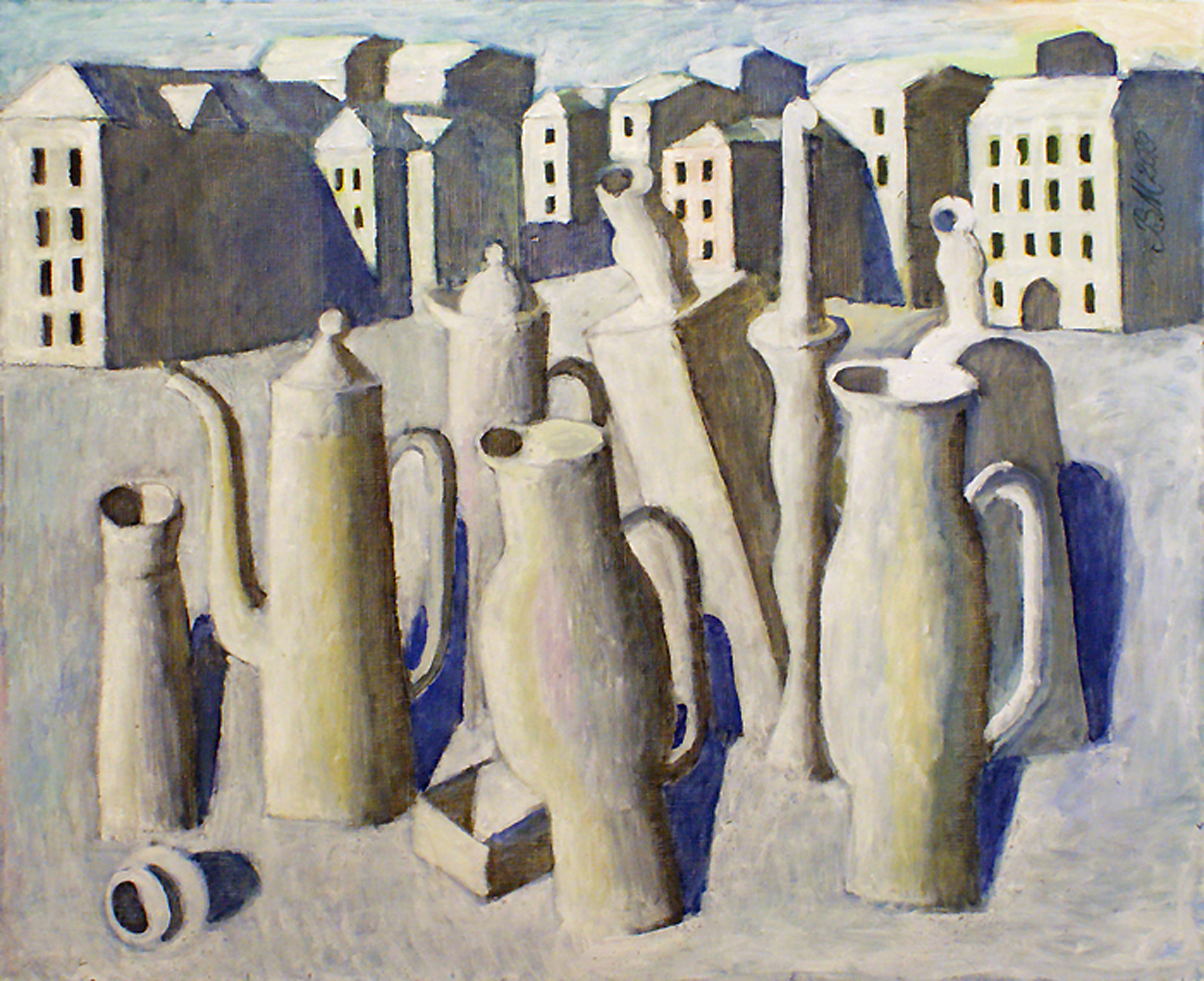

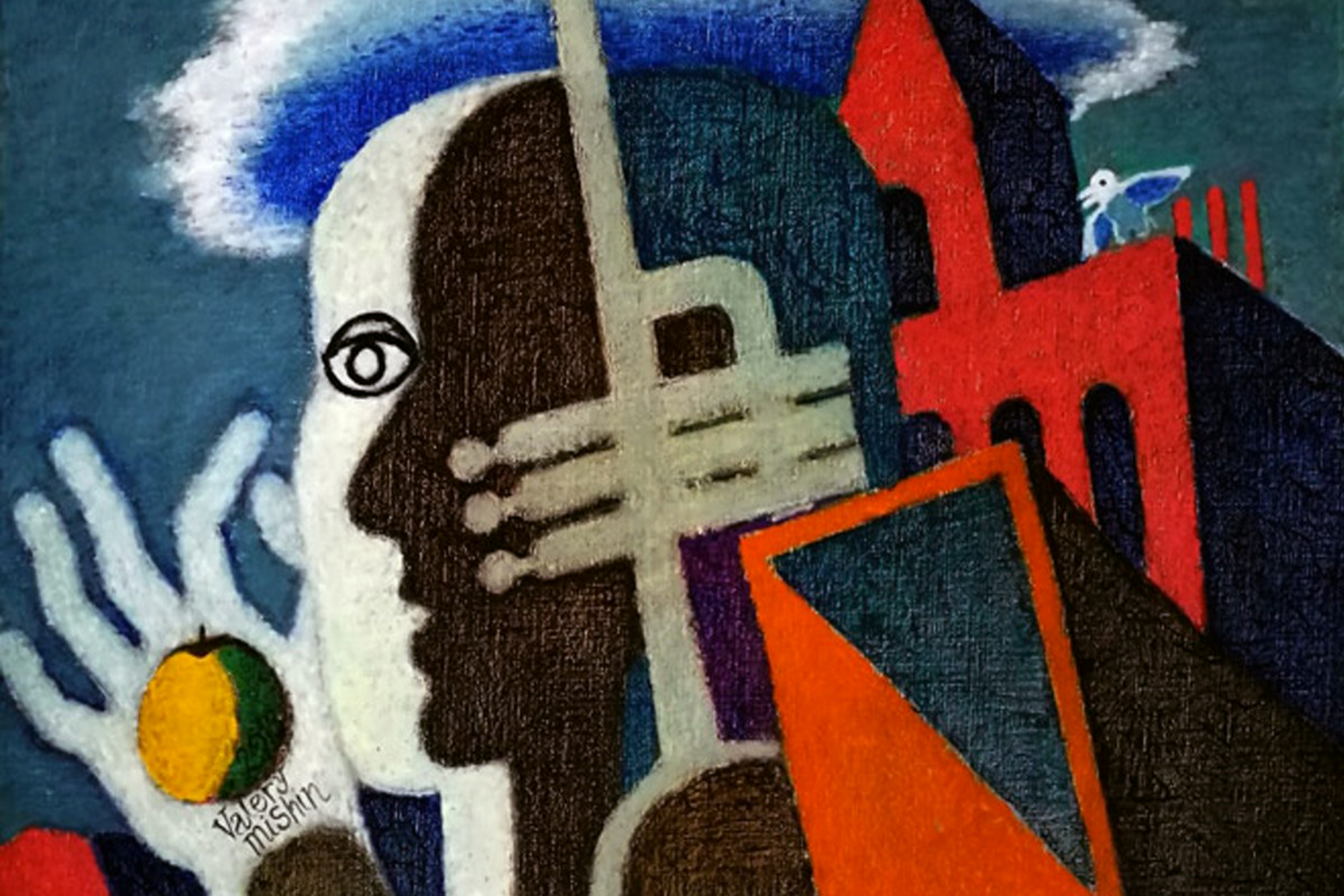

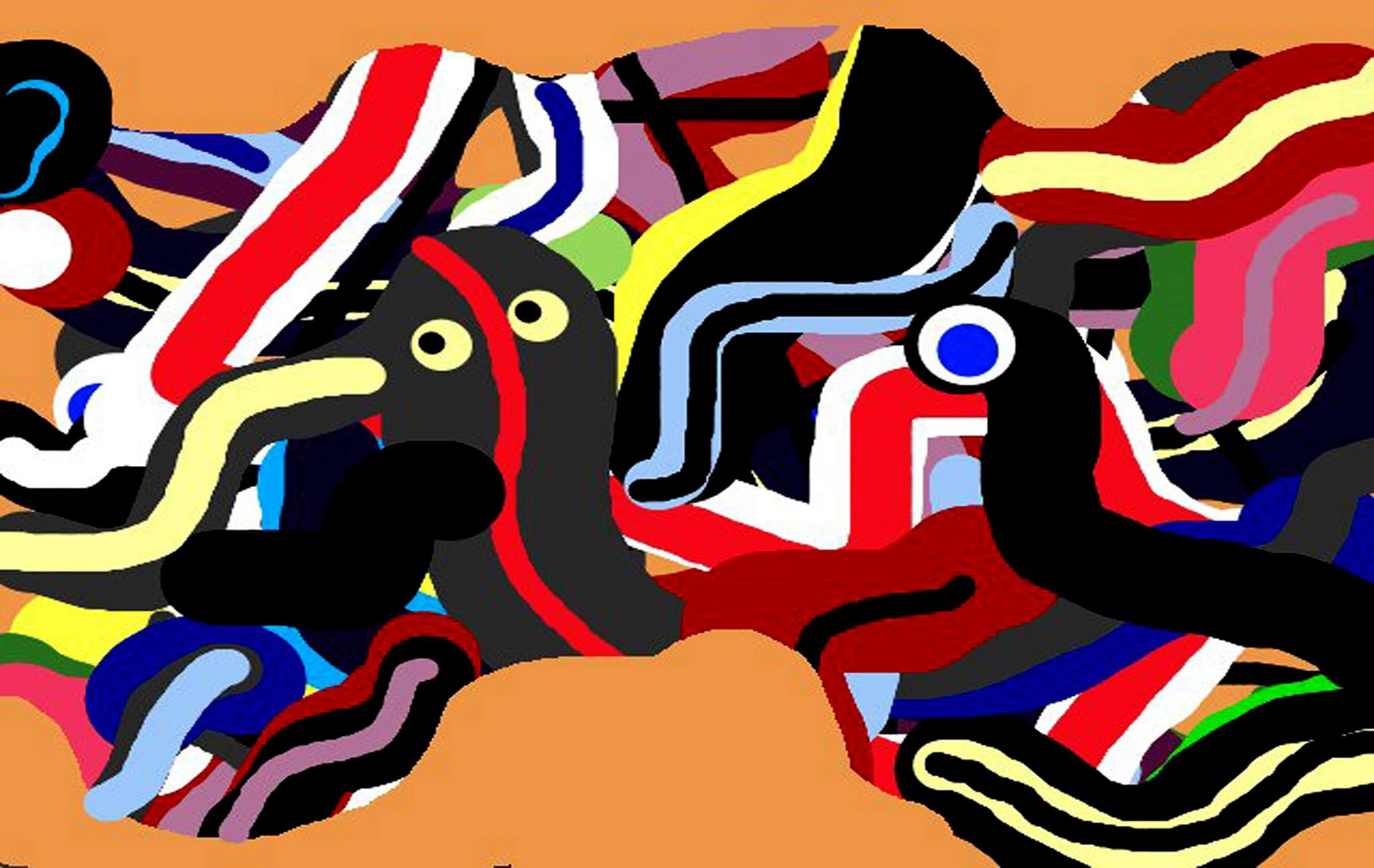

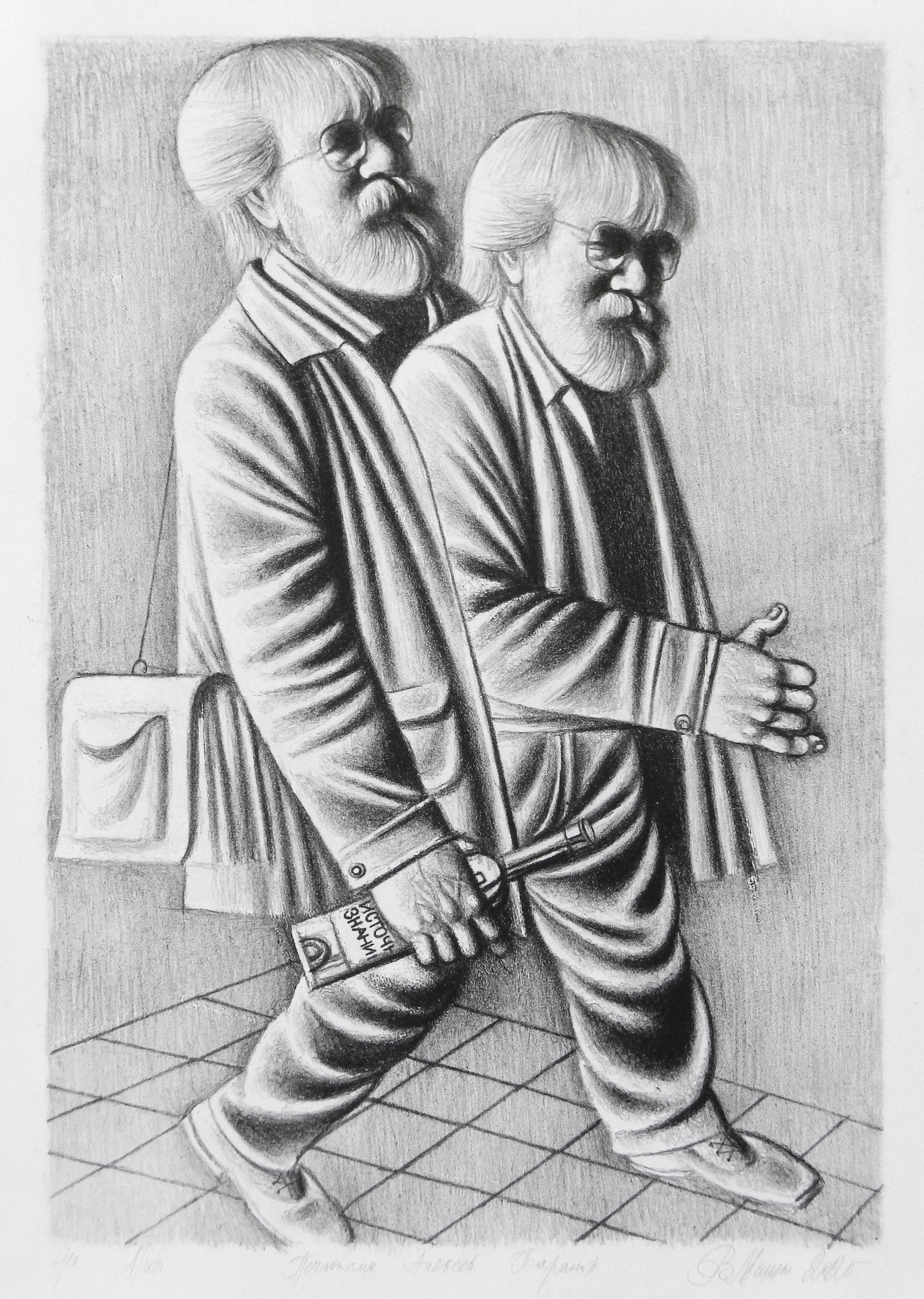
