= David Poeppel =

German psychologist

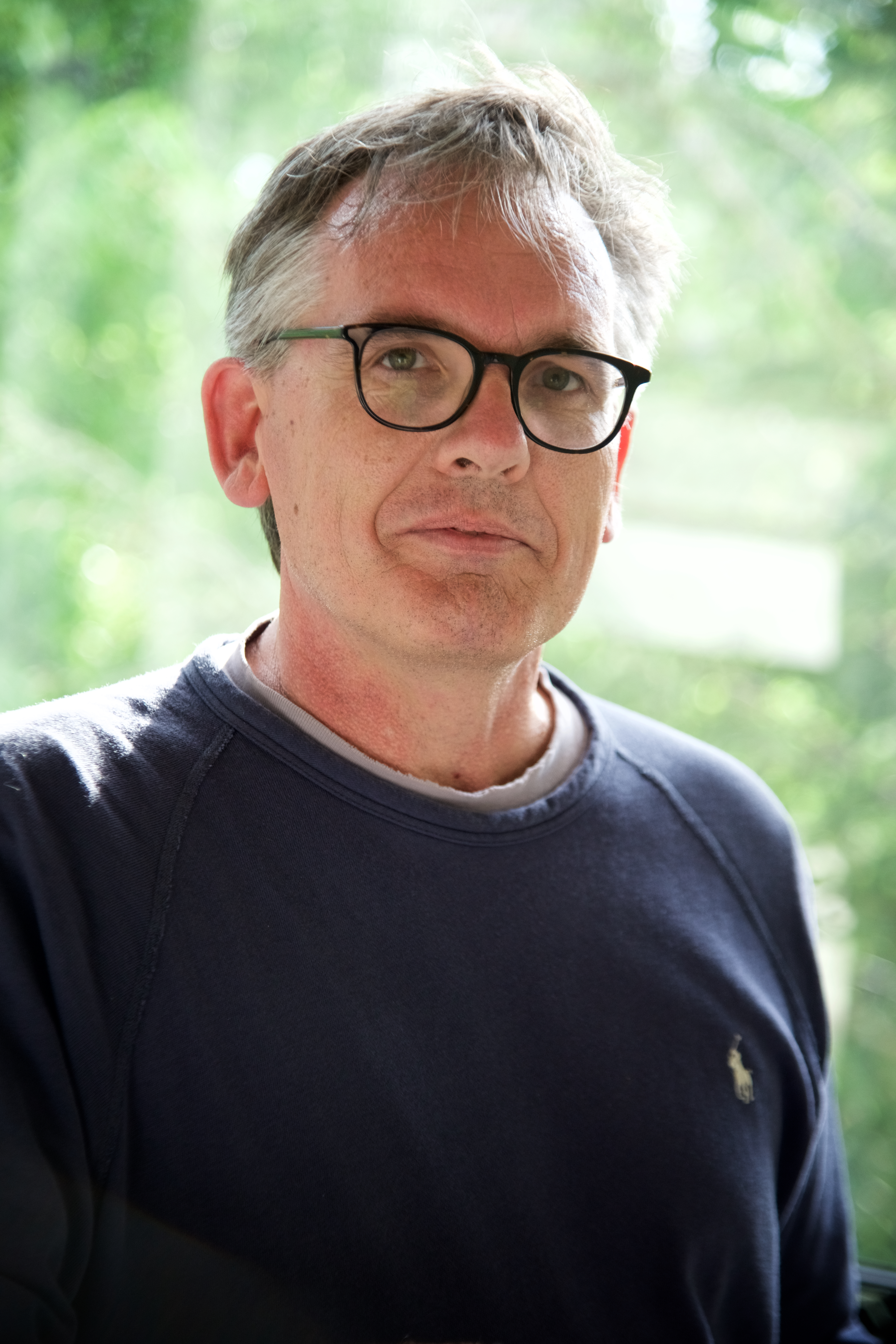
- Born: 1964 (age 61–62); Freiburg, West Germany
- Education: Massachusetts Institute of Technology
- Occupation: Professor of Neuroscience
- Father: Ernst Pöppel

David E. Poeppel (born 1964 in Freiburg) is Professor of Psychology and Neural Science at New York University (NYU). From 2014 until the end of 2021, he was the Director of the Department of Neuroscience at Max Planck Institute for Empirical Aesthetics (MPIEA). In 2019, he co-founded the Center for Language, Music and Emotion (CLaME) an international joint research center, co-sponsored by the Max Planck Society and New York University. From 2021 to 2024, he was the managing director of the Ernst Strüngmann Institute.

== Biography ==
Poeppel grew up in Munich, Germany; Cambridge MA, USA; and Caracas, Venezuela. He received his Abitur from the Maximiliansgymnasium in Munich, obtained his bachelor's degree (1990) and doctorate (1995) from Massachusetts Institute of Technology MIT. He received training in functional brain imaging as a postdoctoral fellow at the School of Medicine of the University of California, San Francisco. From 2000 to 2008, Poeppel directed the Cognitive Neuroscience of Language Laboratory at the University of Maryland College Park, where he was a professor of linguistics and biology. He joined New York University in 2009.

He was a fellow at the Wissenschaftskolleg zu Berlin and has been a guest professor at several institutions. He has received the DaimlerChrysler Berlin Prize of the American Academy of Arts and Sciences and other honors.

He is married to the novelist Amy Poeppel and they have three sons, Alex, Andrew and Luke. His parents are Christiane Blohm and Dr. Ernst Pöppel.

== Research ==
David Poeppel employs behavioral and cognitive neuroscience approaches to study the brain basis of auditory processing, speech perception, language comprehension, and sometimes music. The research in Poeppel's laboratory addresses questions such as: What are the cognitive and neuronal "parts lists" that form the basis for language processing, i.e., what are the fundamental constituents used in speech and language? How is sensory information transformed into the abstract representations that underlie language processing? What are the neural circuits that enable language processing? The research covers the range of questions 'from vibrations in the ear to abstractions in the head.'

The major contributions of the Poeppel laboratory include the functional anatomic model of speech and language processing developed with Greg Hickok;, the dual stream model; issues surrounding lateralization in auditory processing, specifically a model known as asymmetric sampling in time; and experimental work on the role of neuronal oscillations in audition and speech perception. He also writes and lectures about methodological questions at the interdisciplinary boundary between cognitive science research and brain research.

== Selected publications ==
Functional anatomy of speech and language: The dual stream model

Hickok G, Poeppel D (2007). The cortical organization of speech perception. Nature Reviews Neuroscience 8: 393–402.

Lau E, Phillips C, Poeppel D (2008). A cortical network for semantics: (de)constructing the N400. Nature Reviews Neuroscience 9: 920–933.

Fundamental mechanisms of speech perception and language comprehension

Poeppel D, Assaneo F (2020). Speech rhythms and their neural foundation. Nature Reviews Neuroscience 21: 322–334.

Assaneo F, Ripolles P, Orpella J, Lin W, de Diego Balaguer R, Poeppel D (2019). Spontaneous synchronization to speech reveals neural mechanisms facilitating language learning. Nature Neuroscience 22:627–632.

Ding N, Melloni L, Zhang H, Tian X, Poeppel D (2016). Cortical entrainment reflects hierarchical structure building in speech comprehension. Nature Neuroscience 19:158-64.

Overath T, McDermott JH, Zarate JM, Poeppel D (2015). The cortical analysis of speech-specific temporal structure revealed by responses to sound quilts. Nature Neuroscience 18:903-911.

Neural oscillations and their role in perception

Luo H, Poeppel D (2007). Phase Patterns of Neuronal Responses Reliably Discriminate Speech in Human Auditory Cortex. Neuron 54: 1001–1010.

Giraud AL, Poeppel D (2012). Cortical oscillations and speech processing: emerging computational principles and operations. Nature Neuroscience 15: 511–517.

Lateralization and its computational consequences for audition

Poeppel D (2003). The analysis of speech in different temporal integration windows: cerebral lateralization as ‘asymmetric sampling in time’. Speech Communication 41: 245–255.

Boemio A, Fromm S, Braun A, Poeppel D (2005). Hierarchical and asymmetric temporal sensitivity in human auditory cortices. Nature Neuroscience 8: 389–395.

Conceptual foundations of cognitive neuroscience

Poeppel D (2012). The maps problem and the mapping problem: Two challenges for a cognitive neuroscience of speech and language. Cognitive Neuropsychol 29: 34–55.

Krakauer J, Ghazanfar A, Maciver M, Gomez-Marin A, Poeppel D. (2017) Neuroscience needs behavior: Correcting a reductionist bias. Neuron 93: 480–490.

== Awards ==
2003 - 2004: Fellow, Wissenschaftskolleg zu Berlin

2004: DaimlerChrysler Berlin Prize, American Academy Berlin

2007: Fellow, American Association for the Advancement of Science (AAAS)
