= Ernst Pöppel =

German psychologist

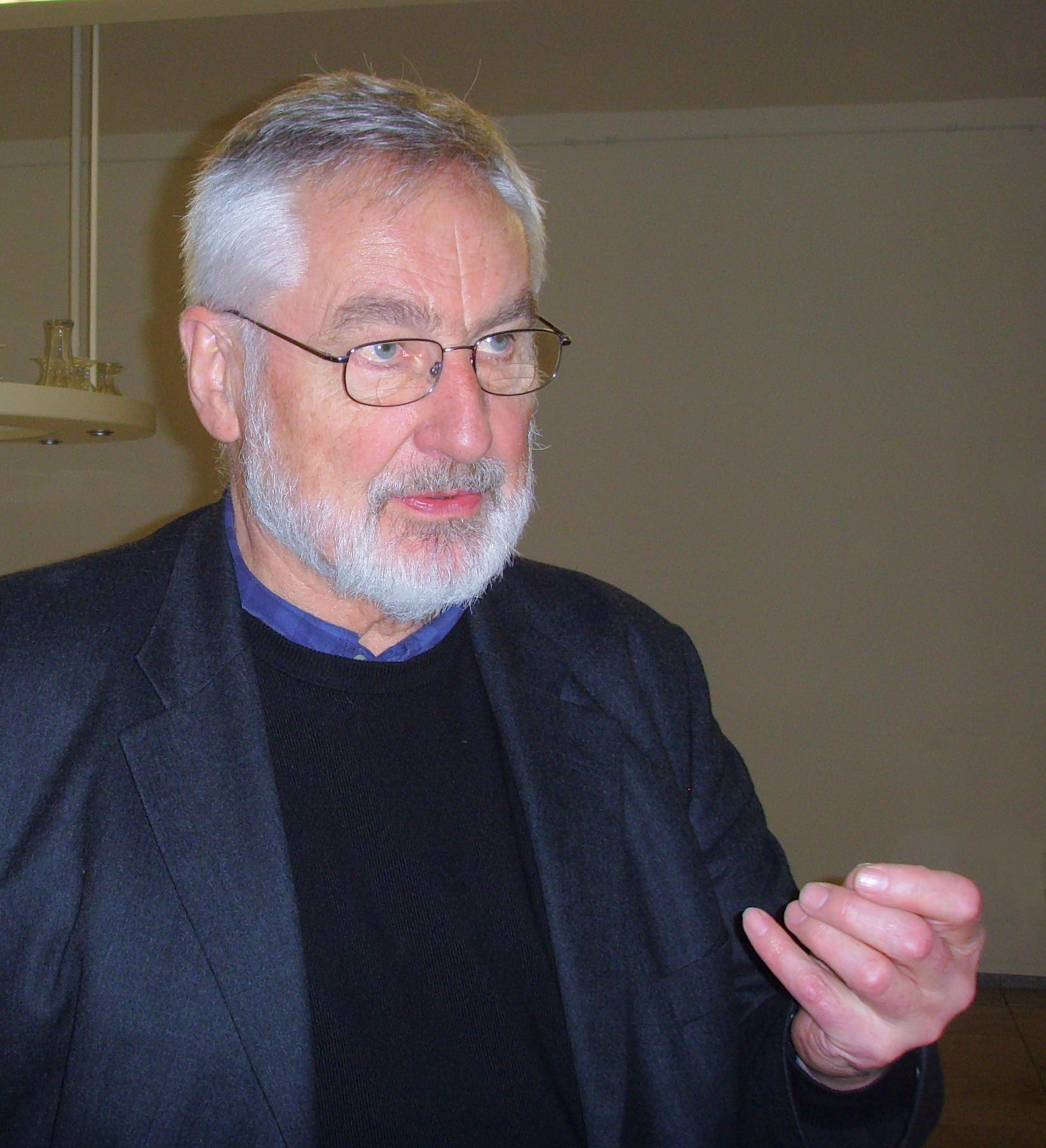
- Ernst Pöppel in 2009
- Born: 29 April 1940 (age 86); Schwessin, Farther Pomerania, Germany
- Children: David Poeppel
- Scientific career
- Fields: Psychology, neuroscience
- Workplaces: Max Planck Institute for Behavioral Physiology; Max Planck Institute of Psychiatry; MIT; LMU Munich; Forschungszentrum Jülich

Ernst Pöppel (born 29 April 1940) is a German psychologist and neuroscientist. He is the father of David Poeppel.

== Education and research ==
Pöppel was born in Schwessin, Farther Pomerania. He studied psychology and biology at the University of Freiburg and LMU Munich, before finishing his academic education with PhD in 1968 at the University of Innsbruck, Austria. He did research on temporal perception and circadian rhythms between 1964 and 1968 at the Max Planck Institute for Behavioral Physiology, and on neurophysiology of vision in 1969 and 1970 at the Max Planck Institute of Psychiatry in Munich. From 1971 to 1973, he did research on neuropsychology of vision at the Department of Psychology and Brain Science at MIT, Cambridge, USA. At the same time, he was staff scientist at the Neuroscience Research Program (NRP). At this time, he described together with Richard Held and Douglas Frost a phenomenon of residual vision, which became known as blindsight.

After his first habilitation in Sensory Physiology (Dr. med. habil.) in 1974, and a second one in Psychology (Dr. phil. habil.) in 1976, he became Professor of Medical Psychology (“Ordinarius”) in 1976 at the Medical Faculty of LMU Munich in Germany. In 1977, he founded the Institute for Medical Psychology, and he became its director, a position he held until 2008. From 1992 to 1997, he had leave of absence from LMU Munich, when he was board member of the national Research Center Jülich, where he was responsible for the Life Sciences (Brain Research, Biotechnology), Environmental Sciences, and Mathematical Modeling. He has been a member of the Leopoldina since 1993.

=== Human Science Center ===
In 1997, he and the neuroscientist Gerhard Neuweiler founded the Humanwissenschaftliches Zentrum (HWZ – Human Science Center) of LMU Munich, and he has been the CEO since then. The HWZ is an interdisciplinary and international platform for research to bridge the gap between academic faculties. With its more than 70 members worldwide, research of the HWZ focuses on “anthropological universals and cultural specifics”. In 1999, for instance, the HWZ started a sequence of Sino-German Workshops together with Peking University. The 7th Sino-German Workshop in 2008, was dedicated to the topic of “Culture and Identity”, which was co-organized with Shihui Han from the Department of Psychology of Beida (Peking University).

=== Directorships ===
Since 2000, Ernst Pöppel is also Co-Director of Parmenides Center for the Study of Thinking (Elba, Italy, and Munich), since 2001, he is the Scientific Director of the Generation Research Program (GRP) in Bad Tölz, Germany, and since 2006 he is Co-Director of the FESTO Program of Applied Knowing (F.PAK). The GRP is dedicated to research for the elderly taking into consideration demographic changes; F.PAK develops a new Master Program for vocational learning based on results from the neurosciences and systems theory.

== Recognition and influence ==
Ernst Pöppel has received several honors, like the Bavaria Constitutional Medal, and in 1992 he became Member of Leopoldina (ML), the National Scientific Academy of Germany. He is also member of the European Academy of Sciences and Arts, and has been Dean of Science. He became known for his research on neuropsychology of vision and temporal perception. He has always tried to bring scientific knowledge to general public through books, articles for non-academic audience and a TV series on “Magic Universe of the Brain”. In parallel to his research in vision and temporal perception, he has promoted the cooperation between scientists and artists, a field has become known lately as “Neuro-Esthetics”. Together with the American poet Fred Turner he received an award of the American Poetry Association for an essay on the temporal structure in poems. He works closely together with the Austrian poet Raoul Schrott, and the Russian-German artist Igor Sacharow-Ross, who took up his concept of “Syntopy”. With this new term, which is juxtaposed to “Utopy” the need of bringing together at one place different activities in modern society is expressed. In particular, in cooperation with scholars from Japan (like Hiroshi Shimizu or Tadeshe Kume) this new term and concept has proven to be useful.

Research of Ernst Pöppel has globalized in the last years, having moved now more towards the East compared to earlier orientation towards the West, like cooperation with scientists from the US. He has common projects with Chinese colleagues from Peking University (in particular with Yan Bao and Bin Zhou from the Department of Psychology and with Huisheng Chi and Xihong Wu from the Center of Speech and Hearing Research) and the Chinese Academy of Sciences (Lin Chen), with Japanese colleagues from Tokyo Institute of Technology (in particular Yoshihiro Miyake and Yumiko Muto), with the Russian colleagues like Nikita Podvigin from St. Petersburg and Victor Shklovsky from Moscow, and with the Polish neuroscientist Elżbieta Szeląg from the Nencki Institute in Warsaw. His political motivation for such international cooperations besides scientific interests is: “Scientists are Natural Ambassadors”.
