= Liu Wenxi =

Chinese painter (1933–2019)

- 刘文西
- Born: October 1933; Shengzhou, Zhejiang, China
- Died: 7 July 2019 (aged 85); Xi'an, Shaanxi, China
- Education: Zhejiang Academy of Fine Arts
- Known for: Painting, drawing
- Notable work: Four Generations (祖孙四代); Chairman Mao and the Shepherd (毛主席和牧羊人)
- Movement: Socialist realism "Yellow Earth School"
- Spouse: Chen Guangjian

President of the Xi'an Academy of Fine Arts
- In office 1991–1997

Vice Chairman of the China Artists Association
- In office 1998–?

President of the Yellow Earth School Research Institute
- In office 2004–2019

Vice Mayor of Yan'an

Liu Wenxi (Chinese: 刘文西; October 1933 – 7 July 2019) was a Chinese painter, art educator, and politician. Considered by many critics as the founder of the "Yellow Earth School" of painting, he served as President of Xi'an Academy of Fine Arts and Vice Chairman of the China Artists Association. His portrait of Mao Zedong has been printed on the fifth series of the renminbi since 1999.

== Early life and education ==
Liu was born in October 1933 in a small village in Shengzhou, Zhejiang, Republic of China. He showed artistic talent from a young age, and aspired to become an artist in elementary school when he first heard of da Vinci, whose name sounds similar to "Wenxi" in Chinese.

Liu was introduced to Chen Wangdao, the President of Shanghai's Fudan University, and painted his portrait. Impressed by his skills, Chen recommended him to study at Shanghai Yucai School, which was known for nurturing artistic talent. After studying at Yucai for three years from 1950, he entered Zhejiang Academy of Fine Arts (now China Academy of Art) in 1953, where he was taught by Pan Tianshou and other renowned artists, especially Fang Zengxian and Zhou Changgu, founders of the Zhe style of guohua painting.

== Career ==
Upon graduation in 1958, Liu taught at Xi'an Academy of Fine Arts, later serving as its president from 1991 to 1997. As a transplant in Shaanxi province, Liu immersed himself in the "Yellow Earth" culture of Northern Shaanxi (Shaanbei), and made about 80 trips to 26 cities and counties in the region. Many of his works were inspired by the earthy culture of Shaanbei. He was elected a Vice Chairman of the China Artists Association in 1998. In 2003, he was named one of the 100 "National Famous Teachers" of China. From 2004 until his death, he served as President of the Yellow Earth School Research Institute and President Emeritus of Xi'an Academy of Fine Arts.

In politics, Liu served as Vice Mayor of Yan'an and was a delegate to the 7th and 8th National People's Congresses.

== Works and influence ==
Trained in the socialist-realist style that dominated the early PRC era in Shanghai and Hangzhou, Liu developed a personal style that was influenced by the traditional nianhua aesthetic. His works combine Western perspective projection with a paler and plainer background, and he was considered one of China's most technically competent painters of the socialist-realist style.

Many art critics consider Liu as the founder of the "Yellow Earth School" of painting, pointing to his works since the 1960s, including Four Generations (祖孙四代) and Chairman Mao and the Shepherd (毛主席和牧羊人), which were highly influential at the time. However, this is disputed by his detractors, who perceive a lack of cultural depth in his works, and criticize the stagnation or regression of his artistic skills since the 1980s and 1990s.

Liu's portrait of Mao Zedong is universally known in China as it has been featured on the fifth series of the renminbi, China's national currency, since 1999.

== Personal life ==
Liu painted the portrait Mao Zedong thousands of times and came to mimic Mao's appearance. According to his wife Chen Guangjian, he loved the Mao suit and loathed trying on any other clothes.

Liu died on 7 July 2019 at the No. 1 Hospital of Xi'an Jiaotong University, aged 85.
