= Richard Held =

Richard Marx Held
- Born: October 22, 1922; New York, NY
- Died: November 22, 2016 (aged 94); Northampton, MA
- Education: Harvard University, Swarthmore College, Columbia University, Stuyvesant High School
- Occupation: Professor
- Employer: Massachusetts Institute of Technology
- Known for: Vision research, Gestalt Psychology
- Scientific career
- Thesis: Trained shifts in binaural direction finding: Their implications for the genesis of auditory space (1952)
- Doctoral advisor: Stanley Smith Stevens
- Other academic advisors: Georg von Békésy; Meyer Schapiro; Wolfgang Köhler

Richard Marx Held (October 10, 1922 – November 22, 2016) was an American professor (emeritus at the time of his death) of Brain and Cognitive Sciences at the Massachusetts Institute of Technology. He conducted some of the first research into visual perception of infants and children. He held a Civil Engineering degree from Columbia University, and earned a PhD in experimental psychology on auditory space perception from Harvard University. In 1973, Held was named to the National Academy of Sciences in recognition of his achievements in psychology. He was also a member of the American Academy of Arts and Sciences.

== Career ==
After graduating from Columbia University and spending two years in the U.S. Navy as a radar officer, Held was invited to join Wolfgang Köhler at Swarthmore College. Robert Wurtz later described their research as a precursor to Hubel and Wiesel's discovery of responses of single cell cortical neurons to light stimuli on the retina.

While at Harvard, Held designed his own lab equipment to study how people learn and relearn their spatial perceptions and coordination. Held researched how a person learns to locate sound by displacing their ears with padded earphones attached to two microphones. Sounds were played in the anechoic lab around them. After hours of exposure, subjects could accurately locate the source of the sound.

Working as an associate professor at Brandeis University, Held conducted research into development of sight of kittens in the early 1960s. The kittens were exposed to light only under regulated test conditions to allow Held to examine the correlation between movement and sight in vision development.

In his 1976 Massachusetts Institute of Technology research funded by National Institutes of Health, National Aeronautic and Space Administration, and the Spencer Foundation, Held showed that babies would rather look at a pattern containing lines than one without. By reducing the width of the lines until the babies showed no preference between the pattern with (fine) lines and the pattern without lines, he could measure the babies' visual acuity. In 1978, Held found that impediments to vision in babies, such as drooping eyelids, should be treated immediately to prevent long-term vision impairment.

Vision researchers Eileen Birch and Jane Gwiazda and Shinsuke Shimoto worked with Held in 1980. They found that a baby's ability to see in three dimensions first appears at 16 weeks and rapidly develops over the next five weeks. If proper eye coordination does not develop during this time, it can result in loss of vision in one of the eyes. Held worked with Ernst Pöppel and Douglas Frost in 1983 in an experiment examining brain injured individuals who appeared blind but still showed localized responses to light. They found that pupils respond to light even after vision loss.

Held was an adjunct professor at the New England College of Optometry pursuing the study of the development of myopia revealed by aging subjects.

MIT Professor Emeritus Held worked with Pawan Sinha researching in India to answer Molyneux's Question through Project Prakash. In this work, blind children are restored to sight and to the ability to be tested if the beginning of spatial vision requires movement-produced stimuli to develop visual capabilities.

== Research ==
=== Kitten vision study ===
After demonstrating the role of self-produced movement in visual adaptation, Held tested its role in the development of visual function. It was found that if two kittens kept in darkness were exposed to light only when one kitten was tied to a lever and allowed to move while another kitten was sitting stationary in a basket on the other end of the lever, moving only because the other kitten was pulling it, the kitten that was moving itself would learn to see while the stationary kitten failed to visually control its movements. Further, if glasses with prisms were given to people to augment their vision, they were only able to adjust to the change in vision when moving around, showing that vision in humans and higher animals requires bodily responses.

=== Infant visual acuity testing ===
In 1984, Held found that from four to six months old, females have a more highly developed visual cortex than males. At the same stage of development, males have a testosterone peak. Held was working with the staff of the Massachusetts Eye and Ear Infirmary to develop tests for detecting visual abnormalities in infants and children in 1984.

Held later studied vision in babies. The infants were shown diagonal and horizontal or vertical lines to study astigmatism. He found that infant astigmatism, if given optical correction, does not show neural loss. Because many eye exams for children at that time were superficial until the child went to school, children would develop preventable vision disorders. He presented his findings and method for testing visual acuity in babies at a vision symposium sponsored by the National Research Council of the National Academy of Sciences. Held's test involved a baby being shown two patches of light in a dark room. Because babies look at the light with the most edges, there would be one blank light and one with alternating black and white bars. The bars would become thinner until the infant stopped showing a looking preference, indicating it could no longer see the difference. This test was simple and accurate enough for vision testing to become a routine check in clinics for the first time. It was accurate enough to test infants from two weeks to one year of age.

Held's work with Eileen Birch and Jane Gwiazda focused on eye coordination. Babies of varying ages were shown patterns that were two and three dimensional through a special set of goggles. If the baby paid attention to the three dimensional image longer, it meant the child could see three dimensions.

=== Molyneux's question study ===
Molyneux posed the question:

- Can someone blind from birth who has only been able to distinguish forms by touch actually recognize the object when given sight?
- Can they discriminate immediately, or is further contact with the visual world required?

In Held's work with Project Prakash, five patients from age 8 to 17 received surgery to correct blindness and become fully sighted. The newly sighted subjects were able to discriminate between visually similar shapes. However, if the children felt an unseen object and were then asked to distinguish it visually from another similar object, they scored no better than guessing. However, within a week, the ability to compare tactual with visual representations is achieved.

== Personal life ==
Held married Doris Bernays, the daughter of Edward Bernays and Doris Fleischman, in 1951 in New York. They had three children: Lucas, Julia and Andrew Held. On November 22, 2016, Held died in Northampton, Massachusetts at the age of 94.
