= Fifth series of the renminbi =

1999 banknote issue by the People's Bank of China

The fifth series of the renminbi is the current coin and banknote series of the Chinese currency, the renminbi. They were progressively introduced since 1999 and consist of ¥0.1, ¥0.5, and ¥1 coins, and ¥1, ¥5, ¥10, ¥20, ¥50, ¥100 notes. The ¥20 banknote is a new denomination, and was added in this series. All banknotes in this series feature a portrait of Chinese Communist Party chairman Mao Zedong by artist Liu Wenxi. Therefore, this series of banknotes is also known as "Grandpa Mao" (Chinese: 毛爷爷) among the people.

== First (1999) edition ==
Coins of the first edition replace all 3 values from the previous series, namely ¥0.1, ¥0.5, and ¥1. The Emblem of the People's Republic of China of the previous series has been removed and the title of the state has been replaced by "People's Bank of China". The 1 jiao (¥0.1) coin also shrank in size.

The first edition includes the following coins:

5th Series Coins, First (1999) Edition
Obverse	Reverse	Value	Technical parameters		Description			Date of		
Obverse	Reverse	Value	Diameter	Composition	Edge	Obverse	Reverse	year	issue	withdrawal
		1 jiao (¥0.1)	19 mm	Duralumin (Aluminium alloy)	Plain	Orchid, with pinyin bank title	Bank title, value, year of minting	1999-2005	2000-10-16	Current
		1 jiao (¥0.1)	19 mm	Stainless steel	Plain	Orchid, with pinyin bank title	Bank title, value, year of minting	2005-2018	2005-08-31	Current
		5 jiao (¥0.5)	20.5 mm	Copper alloy-plated steel	Alternating between reeded and smooth	Lotus, with pinyin bank title	Bank title, value, year of minting	2002-2018	2002-11-18	Current
		¥1	25 mm	Nickel-plated steel	"RMB" repeated 3 times	Chrysanthemum, with pinyin bank title	Bank title, value, year of minting	1999-2018	2000-10-16	Current
For table standards, see the coin specification table.

The first edition includes the following banknotes:

5th Series Banknotes, First (1999) Edition
Value	Dimensions	Main Colour	Description			Date of		
Value	Dimensions	Main Colour	Obverse	Reverse	Watermark	printing	issue	withdrawal
¥1 ^{1}	130 × 63 mm	Olive green	Mao Zedong and Orchid	Three Pools Mirroring the Moon at West Lake	Orchid	1999	July 30, 2004	Current
¥5	135 × 63 mm	Purple	Mao Zedong and Narcissus	Mount Tai	Narcissus	1999	November 18, 2002	Limited
¥10	140 × 70 mm	Blue	Mao Zedong and Rose	Three Gorges of the Yangtze River	Rose	1999	September 1, 2001	Limited
¥20	145 × 70 mm	Brown	Mao Zedong and Lotus	Scenery of Guilin	Lotus	1999	October 16, 2000	Limited
¥50	150 × 70 mm	Green	Mao Zedong and Chrysanthemum	Potala Palace	Mao Zedong	1999	September 1, 2001	Limited
¥100	155 × 77 mm	Red	Mao Zedong and Prunus mume	Great Hall of the People	Mao Zedong	1999	October 1, 1999	Limited
For table standards, see the banknote specification table.

=== Remark ===
1. The ¥1 note, introduced on July 30, 2004, can also be regarded into the second edition for its similar new security features to those introduced in the banknotes of the second (2005) edition.

The new banknotes incorporate several measures to foil counterfeiting, including watermarks and inks that fluoresce under ultraviolet light. All but the ¥1 banknote have a metallic strip, and the ¥50 and ¥100 banknotes also feature numbers which change colour when viewed from different angles. The portrayals of different leaders on the ¥100 banknote, and of different nationalities of China, represented by two people in ethnic dress on the front of previous banknotes, have also been uniformly replaced with the image of Chinese Communist Party chairman Mao Zedong.

Those 1999 banknotes except the ¥1 were partly withdrawn since April 1, 2018 due to high quality counterfeits notes in circulation.

== Second (2005) edition ==
The 2005 edition was introduced on August 31, 2005, with the following banknotes and coins:

- banknotes: ¥5, ¥10, ¥20, ¥50, ¥100
- coins: ¥0.1

There is no difference in the basic color and design between the banknotes of the 1999 and 2005 edition. However, new security (anti-counterfeit) features are added in the 2005 edition that distinguishes the two. The differences as compared to the 1999 edition are:

- Dated 2005
- The currency number at the bottom of the reverse is added with “YUAN” indicating the pinyin of the unit (圓) in the Chinese language.
- Added EURion constellation to deter computer-aided counterfeiting
- Removal of fibre threads
- Removal of the second set of serial number on ¥50 and ¥100 banknotes
- Prominent raised ink printing on the right side of obverse
- The upper-right corner of the reverse side is written the name of Bank of China in five languages:
  - Chinese pinyin: Zhonghua Renmin Yinhang
  - Mongolian:
  - Tibetan: ཀྲུང་ཧྭ་མི་དམངས་སྤྱི་མཐུན་རྒྱལ་ཁབ་ཀྱི་དངུལ་ཁང་།
  - Uyghur: جۇڭخۇا خەلق جۇمھۇرىيىتى بانكىسى
  - Zhuang: Cunghgoz Yinzminz yinzhangz it maenz

The material of the new ¥0.1 coin is stainless steel, rather than duralumin (an aluminum alloy, see above).

The second edition includes the following banknotes:

5th Series Banknotes, Second (2005) Edition
Value	Dimensions	Main Colour	Description			Date of		
Value	Dimensions	Main Colour	Obverse	Reverse	Watermark	printing	issue	withdrawal
¥5	135 × 63 mm	Purple	Mao Zedong and Narcissus	Mount Tai	Narcissus	2005	August 31, 2005	Current
¥10	140 × 70 mm	Blue	Mao Zedong and Rose	Three Gorges of the Yangtze River	Rose	2005	August 31, 2005	Current
¥20	145 × 70 mm	Brown	Mao Zedong and Lotus	Scenery of Guilin	Lotus	2005	August 31, 2005	Current
¥50	150 × 70 mm	Green	Mao Zedong and Chrysanthemum	Potala Palace	Mao Zedong	2005	August 31, 2005	Current
¥100	155 × 77 mm	Red	Mao Zedong and Prunus mume	Great Hall of the People	Mao Zedong	2005	August 31, 2005	Current
For table standards, see the banknote specification table.

== Third (2015, 2019, 2020) edition ==
A new 2015 edition was introduced on November 12, 2015, for the ¥100 banknote. The new edition includes:

- Date of printing (2015)
- Raised ink printing on the right side of the obverse replaced with raised printing on the Great Hall of the People (reverse)
- Metallic strip replaced by a visible and colour-shifting security thread, placed on the reverse side of the note
- Restoration of the second (vertical) serial number
- Colour-shifting currency number at bottom-right of the obverse moved to the larger currency number at center of the obverse side of the note

The new 2019 edition of the fifth series of the renminbi was introduced on April 29, 2019, and was issued into general circulation on August 30, 2019, with the following banknotes and coins:

- banknotes: ¥1, ¥10, ¥20, ¥50
- coins: ¥0.1, ¥0.5, ¥1

A new 2020 edition was also introduced on July 8, 2020, for the ¥5 banknote, and was issued into general circulation on November 5, 2020.

The new design is similar to the banknotes of the 1999 and 2005 edition, with some changes made to the printing patterns of both bills and coins. Officials at the People's Bank of China also told the press that the latest issuance does not include a new 5-yuan note, which is being tested for new printing technologies in a bid to reduce counterfeiting of the Chinese currency.

The new ¥1 coin has been narrowed into 22.25 mm, 2.75 mm less than before. Also, the new ¥0.5 coin contains eight isometric serrations with the coin's color becoming nickel instead of golden yellow inside, and the inner edge of the coin is changed into a polygon from circle.

The third edition includes the following coins:

5th Series Coins, Third (2019) Edition
Obverse	Reverse	Value	Technical parameters		Description			Date of		
Obverse	Reverse	Value	Diameter	Composition	Edge	Obverse	Reverse	year	issue	withdrawal
		1 jiao (¥0.1)	19 mm	Stainless steel	Plain	Orchid, with Pinyin of bank title	Bank title, value, year of minting	2019-	2019-08-30	Current
		5 jiao (¥0.5)	20.5 mm	Nickel-plated steel	Reeded	Lotus, with Pinyin of bank title	Bank title, value, year of minting	2019-	2019-08-30	Current
		¥1	22.25 mm	Nickel-plated steel	"RMB" repeated 3 times	Chrysanthemum, with Pinyin of bank title	Bank title, value, year of minting	2019-	2019-08-30	Current
For table standards, see the coin specification table.

The third edition includes the following banknotes:

5th Series Banknotes, Third (2015-20) Edition
Value	Dimensions	Main Colour	Description			Date of		
Value	Dimensions	Main Colour	Obverse	Reverse	Watermark	printing	issue	withdrawal
¥1	130 × 63 mm	Green	Mao Zedong and Orchid	Three Pools Mirroring the Moon at West Lake	Orchid	2019	August 30, 2019	Current
¥5	135 × 63 mm	Purple	Mao Zedong and Narcissus	Mount Tai	Narcissus	2020	November 5, 2020	Current
¥10	140 × 70 mm	Blue	Mao Zedong and Rose	Three Gorges of the Yangtze River	Rose	2019	August 30, 2019	Current
¥20	145 × 70 mm	Orange	Mao Zedong and Lotus	Scenery of Guilin	Lotus	2019	August 30, 2019	Current
¥50	150 × 70 mm	Turquoise	Mao Zedong and Chrysanthemum	Potala Palace	Mao Zedong	2019	August 30, 2019	Current
¥100	155 × 77 mm	Red	Mao Zedong and Prunus mume	Great Hall of the People	Mao Zedong	2015	November 12, 2015	Current
For table standards, see the banknote specification table.
