= Shanghai Biennale =

International arts exhibition in Shanghai, China

The Shanghai Biennale was established in Shanghai in 1996 as China's first international contemporary art biennale. It was initially held in the Shanghai Art Museum. From 2012 on, it has been hosted in Power Station of Art, the first state-run museum dedicated to contemporary art in mainland China. Aside from its main museum show, it also includes talks, lectures and installations in various venues throughout the city.

== First edition ==
The Shanghai Biennale was founded in 1996 by Fang Zengxian, then director of the Shanghai Art Museum, and was hosted at the museum for eight editions before switching to the Power Station of Art in 2012. The first edition of Shanghai (Fine Art) Biennale was approved by the Ministry of Culture and Shanghai Municipal Administration and held from March 18 to April 7, 1996. Its theme was named "Open Space" in order to highlight the new opening of the country towards the development of many cultural fields. This edition was attended by 29 artists and displayed 114 pieces of artworks including paintings and installations. Among the 29 artists, 26 are oil painters and 3 are Chinese diaspora artists whose installation works were shown.

== 1998 edition ==
The second edition of Shanghai Biennale was organized in collaboration with the Annie Wong Art Foundation and on displayed from October 10 to November 20, 1998. The exhibition almost doubled in size and showcased a total of 200 works from 50 artists, of which 15 are Chinese diaspora artists. The theme is "Integration and Expansion", which explored ink as an important subject matter throughout the history of Chinese modern art. Using a traditional art medium in China, the works displayed a wide range of techniques, expressions and experiments. The main object of this edition was to contextualize the development of ink art even in the contemporary production of artworks and to explore new possibilities of its employment.

== 2000 edition ==
The year 2000 is a turning point as many ground-breaking elements were implemented. This was the first edition that invited foreign artists and curators, and displayed new media artworks that are more at the forefront of contemporary art with the purpose to improve Shanghai's role in arts as the "gateway to the west". This edition was held from November 6, 2000 to January 6, 2001. It was also the first that gained global attention. The international aspect of this edition can be deduced from the title: even if it has been translated into "Spirit of Shanghai", the Chinese characters create a wordplay upon the name of the city (上"Shang" and 海"Hai" so "over the sea") that stands for "on the high seas". It suggested Asia as an important agent in global contemporary art movements and discourses. The curatorial team was headed by Hou Hanru.

== 2002 edition ==
Named "Urban Creation", the fourth edition of Shanghai Biennale consisted of "Urban Creation" exhibition and the "Shanghai hundred historic buildings" exhibition. From November 22, 2002 to January 20, 2003 a group of 68 artists and architects took part in it with their 300 works, some of them created expressly for Shanghai Biennale.

== 2004 edition ==
From September 28 to November 28, 2004 Shanghai dealt with the exploration of the visible world, so the world of technology and its way of impacting on human daily life. Named "Techniques of the Visible", it focused on the close relationship between art and technology, especially how art reveals its interdependent nature that produces technology and then related itself to humanity. This fifth edition has involved a wide series of shows in the whole city (multi-site exhibitions), organized by a team of three Chinese curators and an Argentinean one: Xu Jiang, Sebastián López, Zheng Shengtian, and Zhang Qing.

== 2006 edition ==
Living in the era of ubiquitous design and art, the sixth edition of Shanghai Biennale focused on "hyper design" as its main theme. From September 6 to November 5, 2006 it examined how design is constantly linked to everyday life.

== 2008 edition ==
The seventh edition of Shanghai Biennale lasted from September 9 to November 16, 2008.

== 2010 edition ==
Lasting from October 24, 2010 to January 23, 2011, the eighth edition of Shanghai Biennale was defined as a "rehearsal" so a reflective space of performance and included an unprecedented amount of performance art. The specific responsibility of the curators, who included Fan Di'an, director of the National Art Museum of China, and Gao Shiming, a professor at the China Academy of Art in Hangzhou, was to differentiate, organize and then mobilize the whole art system.

== 2012 edition ==
The ninth edition of Shanghai Biennale was held in the Power Station of Art, a brand-new location with almost 97,000 square feet of exhibition space from October 2, 2012 to March 31, 2013. To fill the voluminous halls of this new venue, large-scale works were chosen by the chief curator Qiu Zhije, the Hong Kong curator Johnson Chang, the New York-based media theorist Boris Groys, and Jens Hoffmann, deputy director of the Jewish Museum in New York. A total number of 90 solo artists and collectives from 27 countries were selected according to their interpretation of "Reactivation", the theme of the 2012 Shanghai Biennale. "Reactivation" referred to the reform and restarting of the Nanshi Power Plant and the Expo 2010 "Pavilion of Future" in the shape of Power Station of Art.

== 2014 edition ==
The tenth edition of Shanghai Biennale, titled "Social Factory", was curated by Anselm Franke and was held at the Power Station of Art from 23 November 2014 to 31 March 2015. "The 10th Biennale explores questions surround the concept of the ‘social’; its construction and re-construction, its process of creation, and its impacts." The assistant curators were Freya Chou, Cosmin Costinas, and Liu Xiao.

== 2016 edition ==
"Why not ask again?" is the byword of the 11th Shanghai Biennale (2016 November, 11 - 2017 March 12) chosen by Raqs Media Collective in the shape of Jeebesh Bagchi, Monica Narula and Shuddhabrata Sengupta.

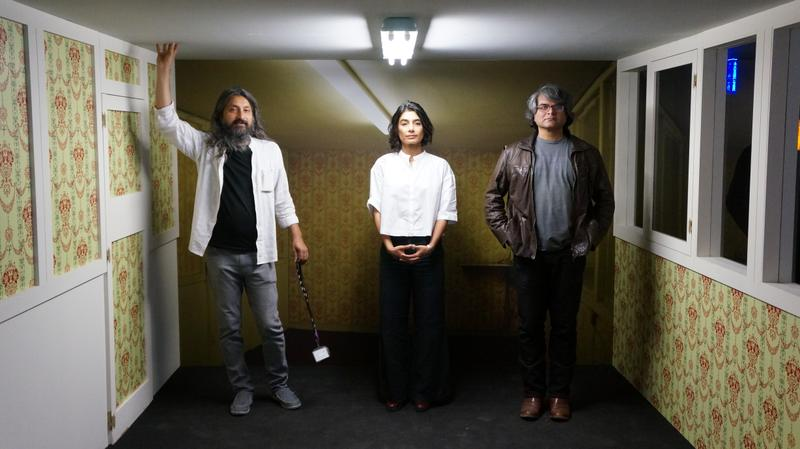
Raqs Media Collective

The 11th Shanghai Biennale develops through a series of intersecting sections named "Terminals", "Infra-Curatorial Platform", "Theory Opera", "51 Personae" and "City Projects".

"Terminals" features artists Ivana Franke (Croatia), Regina José Galindo (Guatemala), Marjolijn Dijkman (Netherland) and MouSen + MSG (China).

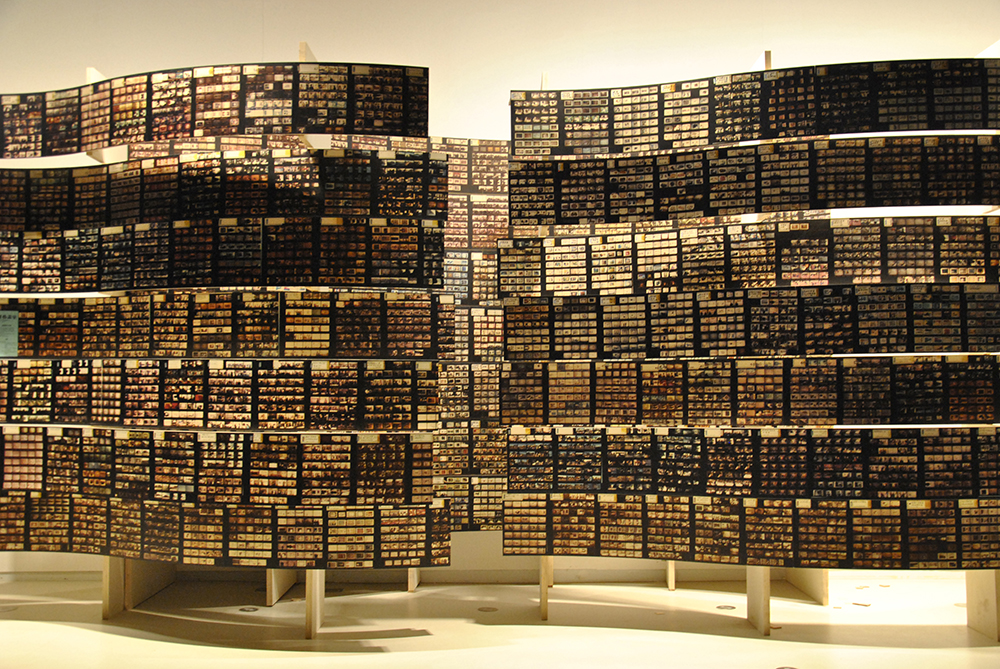
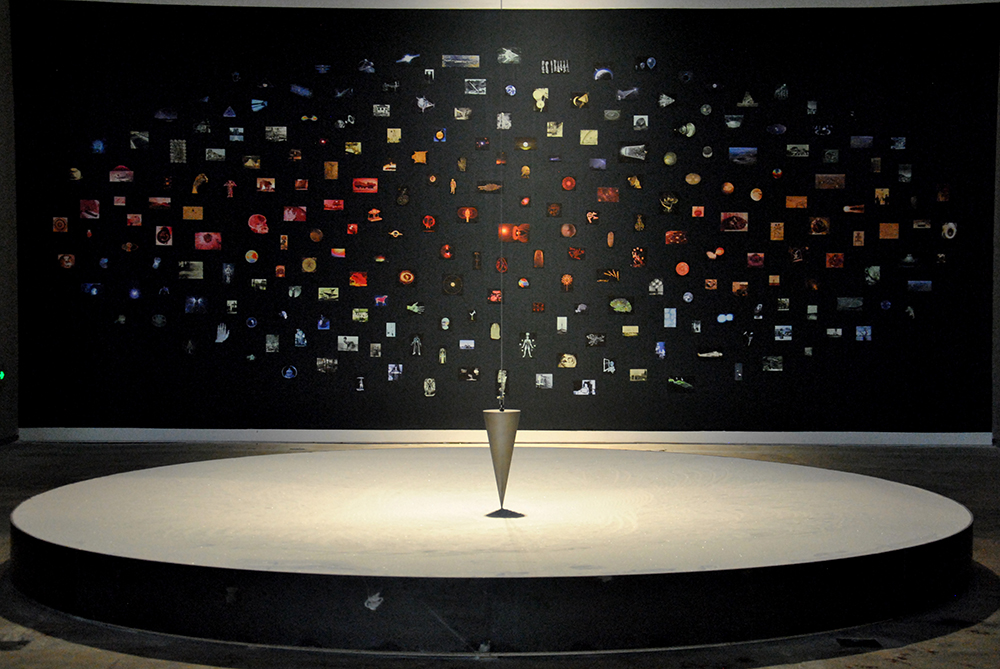
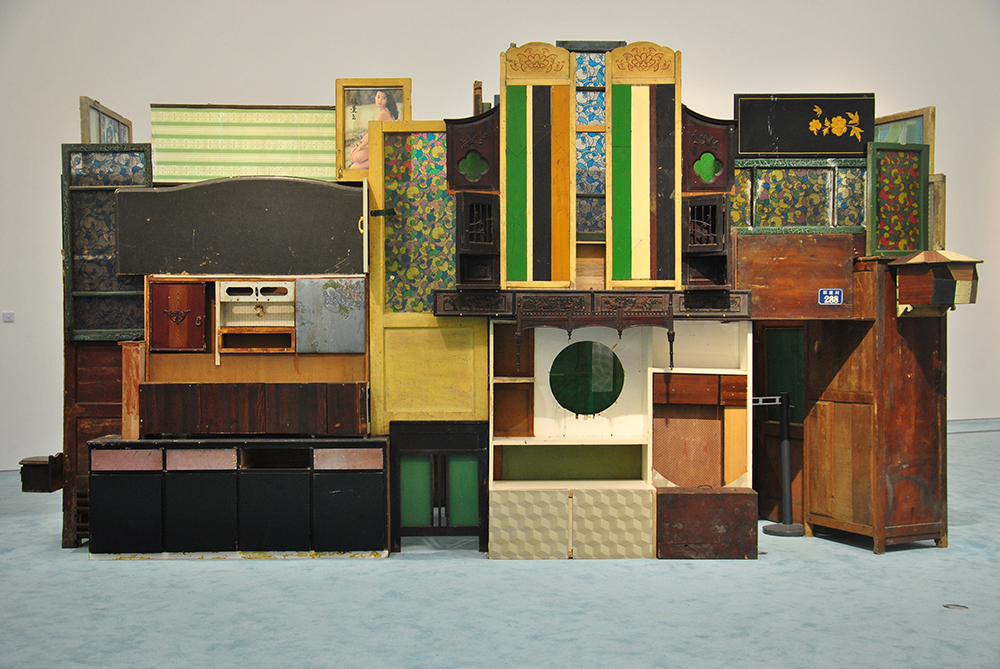
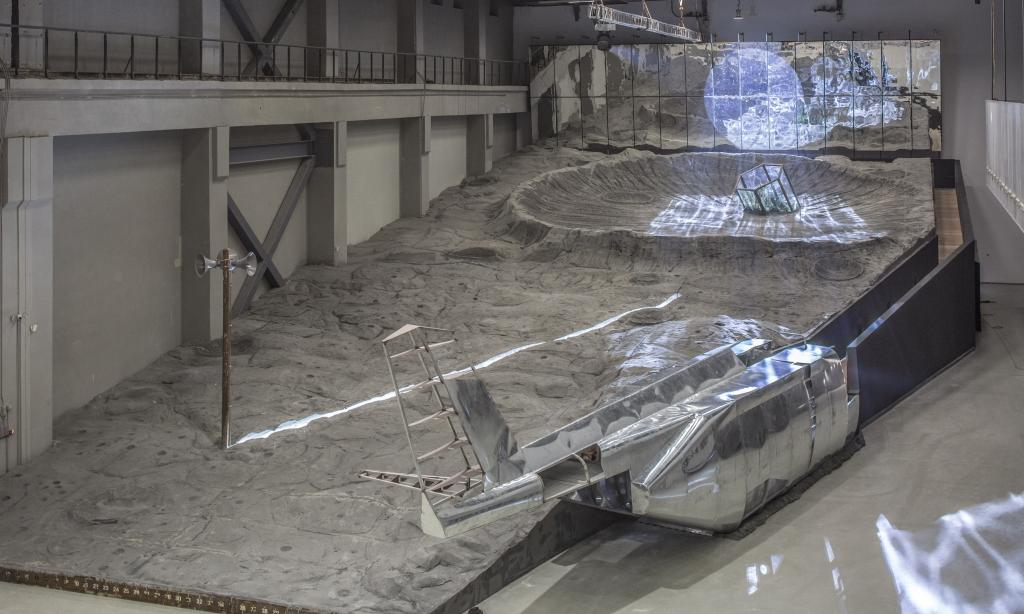
11th Shanghai Biennale artworks from upper left: The Ha Bik Chuen Archive (contact sheets 1960-2009, 2016), Lunar Station (Marjolijn Dijkman, 2015), The Great Chain of Being - Planet Trilogy (MouSen + MSG, 2016), Seven Days (Wang Haichuan, 2013).

== 2018 edition ==
The twelfth edition of Shanghai Biennale, titled "Proregress—Art in an Age of Historical Ambivalence", was curated by Cuauhtémoc Medina and was held at the Power Station of Art from 10 November 2018 to 10 March 2019. Curatorial collegiate were María Belén Sáez de Ibarra, Yukie Kamiya, Wang Weiwei. The 12th edition of the Biennale dealt with topics of feminism, gender-based violence, xenophobia, and climate change. It made an attempt to understand these topics within their historical contexts, while viewing "the ‘present’ as a combination of contradictory trends and forces."

== 2020 edition ==
The thirteenth edition of Shanghai Biennale, titled "Bodies of Water", was curated by Andrés Jaque. It ran from 10 November 2020 to 27 June 2021, with first phase compromising of online workshops, screenings, panel talks and offline performances. The main exhibition, originally scheduled to open in November, was delayed due to Covid-19 restrictions and opened on 17 April 2021 at the Power Station of Art. Curatorial collegiate were Marina Otero Verzier, Lucia Pietroiusti, You Mi, Filipa Ramos. The Biennale's central concerns were: "ecology, hydrology, posthumanism, and the interconnectedness of all lifeforms on earth".

== 2023 edition ==
The fourteenth edition of Shanghai Biennale, titled "Cosmos Cinema", was curated by Anton Vidokle and was held at the Power Station of Art from 9 November 2023 to 18 February 2024. Curatorial collegiate were Zairong Xiang, Hallies Ayres, Lukas Brasiskis, Ben Eastham. The curatorial framework was inspired by Russian cosmism, which placed philosophy, art, mythology and spirituality against ideas of planetary colonization and resource extraction.

== 2025 edition ==
The fifteenth edition of Shanghai Biennale, titled "Does the flower hear the bee?", was curated by Chief Curator Kitty Scott and was held at the Power Station of Art from 8 November 2025 to 31 March 2026. Co-curators were Daisy Desrosiers and Xue Tan, and curatorial collegiate were Long Yitang and Zhang Yingying. The Biennale's central concerns were "indigenous modes of knowing, he natural world, and human sensorial faculties." The title was drawn from an experiment conducted in University of Turin, which deducted that plants can actually hear and respond to bees.
