= Shahpour Shahbazi =

Iranian director, screenwriter and author

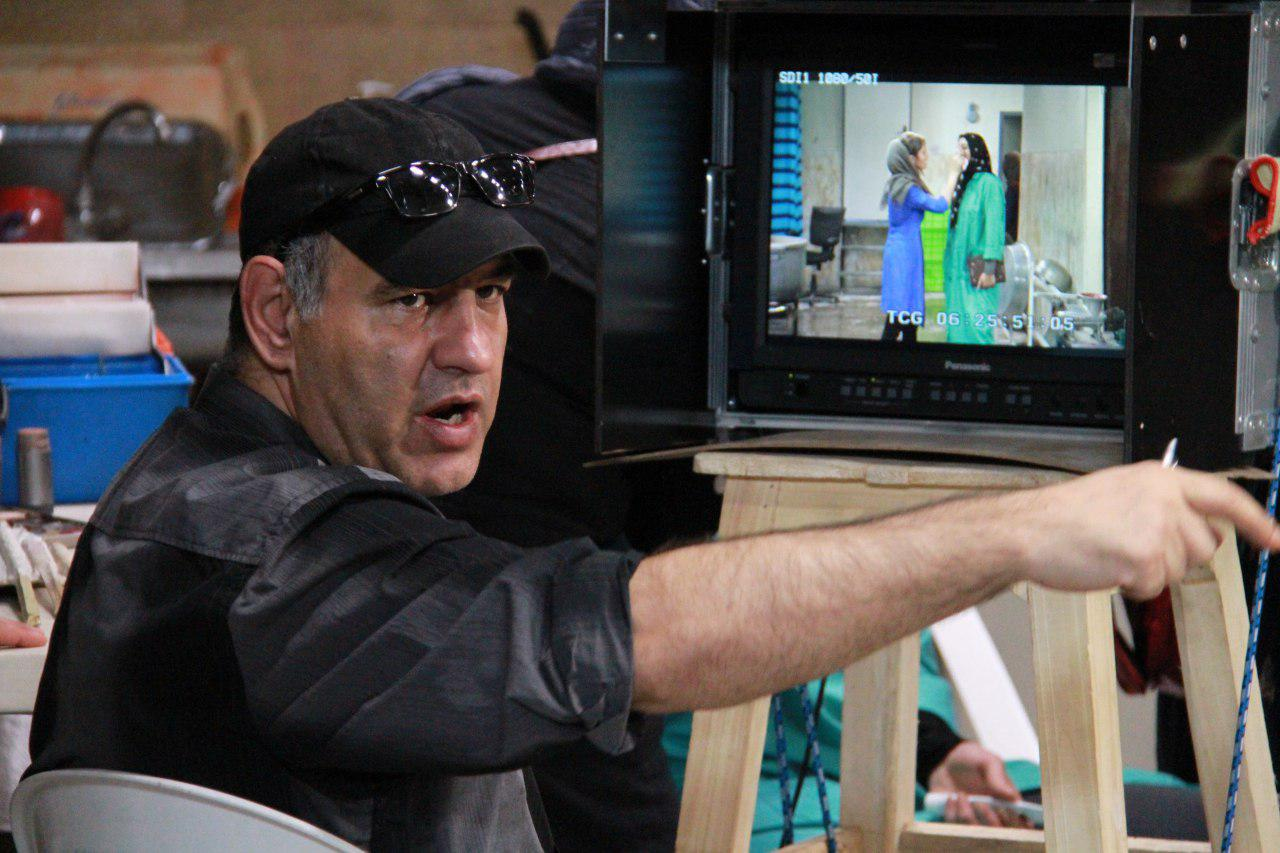
- on the set of the film "Silence of Souls". 2018 by Hamidhaghparast
- Born: 5 June 1961 (age 65); Kermanshah, Iran
- Education: Master's degree in Art Research and Ph.D. Student from the Field of Cinema Activity Years of activity: from 1983 to now

Shahpour Shahbazi (born 5 June 1961) is an Iranian director, screenwriter, and author.

== Biography ==
Shahpour Shahbazi immigrated to Germany to continue his studies in cinema.

Graduating from college of the Heidelberg University in Germany, Shahpour Shahbazi continued his studies at the State University of the Visual Arts in Karlsruhe.

Major philosophers from Germany Peter Sloterdijk and Boris Groys in the field of philosophy and professors like Hans Beller and Lothar Spree in the field of cinema were Shahpour Shahbazi's professors at university.

Shahbazi was admitted to the Karlsruhe University after graduating in Art Research as a doctoral student under the supervision of Professor Boris Groys, a German philosopher.

He is an active member of "Verband der deutschen Filmkritik" (Association of German Film Critics) in Germany and "Anjoman Montaghedan va Nevisandegan Cinemaye Iran" (Iranian Cinema Critics and Writers Association) in Iran.

== Awards and honours ==
- Receiving the Statue Award for Best Cinematographic Analysis by Iranian Cinema Critics and Writers Association (2017)
- Award and appreciation plot from the Screenwriter's Club for a series of activities in the field of screenwriting (2014)
- Award and honour card Membership in the Iranian Writer's Club (2014)
- The winner of the Ghalame Zarrin (Golden Pen) for the best cinematic critic writer by Khaneye Cinema (The House of Cinema) (2011)
- The winner of the International Jury's Special Prize in the 40th International Roshd Festival for his film Pole (The Bridge) in 2010
- Award winner at the German Short Film Festival (1999)
- Winner of the Best Short Film Festival of Gutenberg (1999)

== Resume ==
Book	Publisher	Language	Publishing year
Goftam; Goft	Norahan	Persian	2021
Machiavelli va sad rahe rezalat	Nazar	Persian	2020
Terminologie Tahliliye Filmnameh	Cheshmeh	Persian	2018
DIaletik Cheshmha	Cheshmeh	Persian	2015
Deramaturgie Film	Cheshmeh	Persian	2015
Teorihaye Filmnameh Dar Cinemaye Dastani 2	Cheshmeh	Persian	2010
Teorihaye Filmnameh Dar Cinemaye Dastani 1	Cheshmeh	Persian	2007

Screenplay	Genre	Year
Siavash	Drama	2000
The Last Plaque	War Screenplay, Cinematic	2004
The Little Prince	social Drama	2005
Crying Phoenix	Melodrama	2006
Who is Rostam of Iran	Social Drama	2007
The Great Journey	Melodrama	2009
Paradis Cinema	Melodrama	2011
Golden Circle	Social Drama	2013
Beat and Beat Symphony	32-part series, comedy with Farhad Tohidi	2014
Dew and Happiness	Social Drama	2009

Screenplay	Writer	Consultant/rewriting	Year
Arezoo	Ali Dehkordi	Screenwriting and Film Editing	2007
Wind Notes	directed by Mohammad Reza Hosseini	screenwriter	2008
Katie's Secret House	Ali Zhakan	Dramatic consultant for the screenplay	2010
Violence and Reconciliation series	Ali Zhanan	Dramatic and rewriting consultant for 25 episodes	2012
Zima Series	Directed by Abbas Ranjbar	Dramatic Consultant 32 episodes	2015

Title	Academic and educational activities	Campus
Screenwriting Professor	Faculty of Cinema and Theater	Tehran
Screenwriting Professor	Azad University of Art and Architecture	Tehran
Screenwriting and Film Analysis Professor	Soura Azad University	Tehran
Screenwriting Professor	Sepehr Azad University	Isfahan
Screenwriting/Directing/Film analysis Professor	The Youth Cinematographers Association	Tehran

Other Activities
Establishment of the Stuttgart Iranian Film Center with others (1993)
Various meetings and lectures on cinema in Stoggard, Cologne, Tehran, Isfahan and Abadan (1373 to 1398)
Publication of numerous cinematic articles in domestic and foreign cinema magazines (1998 to 2009)
Judge of Tehran Soura Short Film Festival
Judge of Isfahan Short Film Festival
Judge of Yazd Short Film Festival

== Filmmaking records ==
Film	Screenwriter	Director	length	Date	Description
Darmiyane Divarha (In Between The Walls)	Shahpour Shahbazi	Shahpour shahbazi	Feature	2017	No permission has been issued in Iran
Sokute Parvaneh ha (The Silence of Butterflies)	Shahpour Shahbazi	Shahpour shahbazi	Telefilm	2014	Broadcast on home network and Chandelle 3 in Iranian TV
Yaddashthaye Shabnam va Das (Diary of Shabnam and sickle)	Shahpour Shahbazi	Shahpour shahbazi	Documentary	2012	Made and displayed in Germany and Italy
Pol (The Bridge)	Shahpour Shahbazi	Shahpour shahbazi	Telefilm	2009	Special Jury Prize Winner (ISCO) At the 40th International Roshd Festival
Shabnam va Sib (Dew and apple)	Shahpour Shahbazi	Shahpour shahbazi	Documentary	2007	-
Maske Moghadas (Holy mask)	Shahpour Shahbazi	Shahpour shahbazi	Semi Feature	2000	Made in Zimbabwe
Dar Jostojuye Khaneh (Looking for a house)	Shahpour Shahbazi	Shahpour shahbazi	Documentary	2000	Made in Germany, Zimbabwe and Mozambique
Vogelverschrikker (Scarecrow)	Shahpour Shahbazi	Shahpour shahbazi	Short Film (In German)	1999	Winner of the Directing Award at the German Short Film Festival Winner of the Best Short Film Festival of Gutenberg Simorgh Bolurin candidate at Fajr International Festival
Azimat (Departure)	Shahpour Shahbazi	Shahpour shahbazi	Semi Feature	1998	-
Gozar (Passage)	Shahpour Shahbazi	Shahpour shahbazi	Short Film	1998	-
Sale no Mobarak (Happy New Year)	Shahpour Shahbazi	Shahpour shahbazi	Short Film	1997	-
