= Youri Jarkikh (Jarki) =

French-Russian artist (born 1938)

Youri Jarkikh (Jarki) (Latin: Zharkikh; Russian: Юрий Александрович Жарких; born July 16, 1938) is a French-Russian painter and visual artist of the "Russian vanguard".

== Early life ==
Jarkikh was born in Tikhoretsk, Krasnodar Krai, Soviet Union.

From 1958 to 1961, Jarkikh attended the Navigation School in Leningrad. From 1961 to 1967, he studied at the Leningrad Vera Mukhina Higher School of Art and Design.

== Career ==
Jarkikh was co-organizer of the movement for independent art in the Soviet Union. He was significant in the cultural history of Leningrad (later Saint Petersburg) as an organizer of the Independent Society for Experimental Exhibitions.

In 1974, Jarkikh organized, with O.Rabin, E. Ruchin and A. Gleser (non-conformist artists), the Bulldozer Exhibition (Russian: Бульдозерная выставка) in Moscow. In 1974 and 1975, Jarkikh was one of the initiators of the Gazanevsky exhibition of unofficial art in Leningrad.

Jarkikh was pursued by the KGB because of his activities. His health was affected through the practice with Iprite (a poison).

In 1977, he emigrated to Germany and, in 1978, to France, where he received political asylum.

In 1984, Jarkikh founded the artists' association, Eidos. Together with 14 other contemporary French artists, he held exhibitions at the Palais des congrès de Paris, from 1987 to 1988. In 1990, he was elected "Premier Peintre de Paris" (First Artist of Paris).

After the "Poets Alphabet" exhibition in Saint Petersburg in 2008, he again accepted Russian nationality, which was offered to him by the Russian government. Jarkikh lives and works in France.

In the judgement of gallery owners, Jarkikh's creativity developed under the influence of the Russian vanguard and German Expressionism. He describes his art style as "Eidos".
