= Power Station of Art =

Municipal contemporary art museum in Shanghai, China

- 上海当代艺术博物馆
- The museum's logo is set in Gotham for both Mandarin and English and designed by Shen Haopeng in 2012.

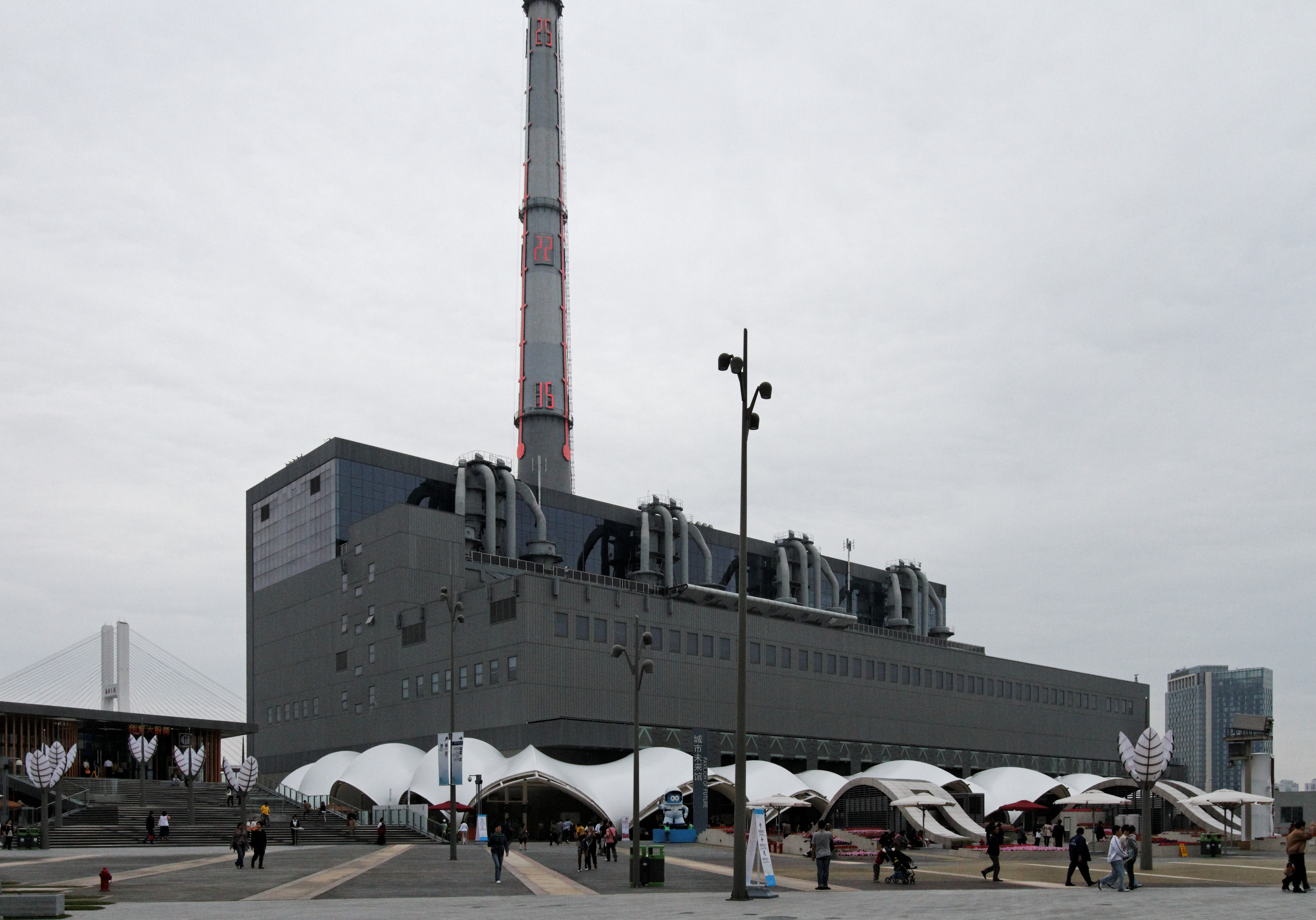
- The facade of Power Station of Art taken during Expo 2010.
- Established: October 1, 2012
- Location: 678 Miaojiang Road, Huangpu District, Shanghai, China 200011
- Type: Art museum
- Key holdings: Shanghai Biennale
- Collections: Contemporary art
- Collection size: 425 (2024)
- Visitors: 700,000 (2019)
- Director: Gong Yan
- Public transit access: South Xizang Road on Line 4, 8 (Shanghai Metro)
- Website: powerstationofart.com

Power Station of Art
- Simplified Chinese: 上海当代艺术博物馆
- Traditional Chinese: 上海當代藝術博物館
- Literal meaning: Shanghai contemporary art museum
Transcriptions
Standard Mandarin
- Hanyu Pinyin: Shànghǎi Dāngdài Yìshù Bówùguǎn

The Power Station of Art (Chinese: 上海当代艺术博物馆; lit. 'Shanghai Contemporary Art Museum'; PSA) is a public municipal contemporary art museum in Huangpu, Shanghai, China. It is an institution directly under the Shanghai Municipal Bureau of Culture and Tourism and hosts exhibitions free to the public.

Power Station of Art sits at the former site of the Nanshi Electric Plant, which opened in 1897 and relocated to the museum's present site on the Huangpu riverside in 1935. After being used as the Pavilion of Future during Expo 2010, the site underwent nine months of repurposing as a museum, before opening to the public on October 1, 2012.

The museum is over 41,000m^{2} in total building space, and has 15,000 m^{2} of space dedicated to exhibitions. It has hosted the Shanghai Biennale since 2012, when it opened by hosting the 9th Shanghai Biennale, "Reactivation". Apart from contemporary art, the museum also holds design exhibitions under the Power Station of Design moniker, and has hosted the Emerging Curators Project since 2014.

== History ==
=== As Nanshi Electric and Power Plants ===
In 1897, the Qing government's Shanghai Road Engineering Relief Bureau established the Nanshi Electric Plant (Chinese: 南市电灯厂) at Laotaiping Wharf, near Shiliupu Dock. It first succeeded in illuminating an electric light on January 21, 1898, and powered 30 street lamps along the Bund a day later. An official company in management of the plant was incorporated in 1918 as Shanghai Huashang Electric Power Co., Ltd. (Chinese: 上海华商电力股份有限公司), and it began constructing a new plant on Bansongyuan Road by October 1935.

The Bansongyuan power plant underwent joint public-private ownership by 1954. However, it was renamed the Nanshi Power Plant (Chinese: 南市发电厂) in 1955 and continued operation as a state-owned enterprise. The plant's main body, consisting of the factory building and a 165-meter tall chimney, finished construction in 1985. Plans to redevelop its site for the forthcoming Expo 2010 were settled in 2004, and the plant ceased operation in 2007. The plant was eventual developed into the Pavilion of Future in the Expo.

=== Conception ===
Impetus for establishing the Power Station of Art can be traced back to 2008. As part of the municipal-level planning associated with the 12th Five-Year Plan, party and government officials conceived of Shanghai's need "to consider the development and prosperity of culture on a higher level". Along with calls from local artists requesting more exhibition space in Shanghai, as well as top-down foresight to expand Shanghai's art industry, the Municipal Administration of Culture and Tourism produced plans for a "Shanghai Grand Art Museum" by early 2009.

On April 11, 2011, Shanghai mayor Han Zheng visited the Shanghai Art Museum. Han, having understood that the museum's collections lacked sufficient exhibition space year-round, directed municipal planning departments to survey appropriate areas for a large-scale art museum. In continuum of plans for repurposing Expo pavilions after the exposition's conclusion, both the Pavilion of Future and the China pavilion, sitting across the Huangpu River from each other, were to be renovated into art museums. In particular, the Pavilion of Future was to exhibit contemporary art "focusing on artistic phenomenons after 1980". Two talks between the municipal government and artists were organized between September and October 2011.

The Pavilion's transformation was confirmed at the closing of the Ninth Plenum of the Shanghai Municipal Committee on November 12, 2011. By December, a preparatory office was formed consisting of five people and headed by Li Xiangyang. The Pavilion's transformation was projected to complete in August 2012, and Li said it "will definitely not just be some painting walls". Li also confirmed that the new museum will host the 2012 Shanghai Biennale.

=== Renovation ===
The 165-meter tall chimney is a prominent feature of the Power Station of Art's industrial architecture.

The renovation process was led by TJAD Original Design Studio, an architectural consulting group formed out of Tongji University's Architectural Design and Research Institute. The design process took place between March 2011 and March 2012, with the primary objective of preserving the building. As a result, the renovation retained the power plant's chimney, rooftop generators, and general layout. The renovation concluded by September 2012, and costed the Shanghai municipal government $64 million.

=== Inauguration ===
Power Station of Art opened at 12:00 on October 1, 2012, to the public, with online pre-registration required and capped at 6,000 visitors a day. It attracted over 3,000 visitors on its first day. The museum's inaugural year visitor count was around 120,000.

An Academic Committee was established in 2013, in which artists and scholars are invited once every three years to govern major decisions surrounding the museum. By 2014, the Committee assumed responsibilities to elect curators to the Shanghai Biennale. The same year, the nationality restriction on curators to the Biennale was removed.

== Accolades ==
Power Station of Art was recognized as a Shanghai Municipal Heritage Architecture on August 17, 2015. It was registered under the address 200 Huayuangang Road, which was the address for the Nanshi Power Plant and remains an alternate address for the museum. The English caption of the award plaque reads:

Former Nanshi Power Plant, industrial building. Completed in 1935, rebuilt in 1980s. Truss structure. Renovated to the Pavilion of Future during the 2010 Shanghai World Expo, then established [sic] the Power Station of Art (PSA) in 2012.

== See also ==
- 50 Moganshan Road
- West Bund Art & Design
- Long Museum
- China Art Museum
- Museum of Contemporary Art Shanghai
- Shanghai Museum
- Tianzifang
- Xintiandi
- 798 Art Zone
