= Igor Sacharow-Ross =

German-Russian visual artist (born 1947)

Igor Sacharow-Ross (born 1947) is a German-Russian visual artist who works in Cologne and Munich.

== Biography ==
Igor Sacharow-Ross was born in Khabarovsk in the Russian Far East. As a nonconformist artist in the Soviet Union of the 1970s, he was subject to political persecution, and eventually deported in 1978.

== Publications ==
- Igor Sacharow-Ross: Schilderwerken. Edited by Katholieke Universiteit Leuven. Text by Jaak Brouwers. Leuven 1979.
- Igor Sacharow-Ross: Radierungen und Objekte. Edited by Albrecht Dürer Gesellschaft. Text by Peter Stepan. Nuremberg 1985.
- Igor Sacharow-Ross: Kraftzellen. Edited by M·A Munich. Text by Boris Groys. Munich 1986.
- Igor Sacharow-Ross: Yagya. Edited by Kulturreferat der Landeshauptstadt Munich M A. Text by Igor Sacharow-Ross, Jean Baudrillard, Boris Groys, Agrippa von Nettersheim, Blaise Pascal, Nicolai Fiodorov. Munich 1987.
- Igor Sacharow-Ross: Zwischenfelder. Edited by Galerie Schüppenhauer, Cologne and Dany Keller Galerie, Munich. Text by Peter Frank. Schuffelen, Pulheim 1988.
- Igor Sacharow-Ross: Kraftzellen II. Edited by Kunstverein Karlsruhe, Kunstverein Ludwigsburg, Kunsthalle Innsbruck. Text by Peter Frank, Boris Groys, Udo Kittelmann, Joseph Beuys. Schuffelen, Pulheim 1989.
- Igor Sacharow-Ross: Tunnel. Edited by Goethe-Institut Madrid. Text by Michael Marschall von Bieberstein, Edith Decker. Madrid 1990.
- Igor Sacharow-Ross: Apotropikon. Räume – Felder – Handlungen. Edited by Galerie Schüppenhauer. Text by Boris Groys, Igor Sacharow-Ross, Peter Stepan. Cologne – Munich 1991.
- Igor Sacharow-Ross: Tabula Rotunda. Edited by Städtische Galerie im Museum Folkwang. Text by Jochen Hörisch, Hermann Krings, Petra Giloy-Hirtz. Essen 1992.
- Igor Sacharow-Ross. Edited by Evelyn Weiss. Text by Leonid Baschanow, Alexander Borovsky, Jewgenja Petrowa, Peter Stepan, Ludwig Weimer. Prestel, Munich–Berlin–London–New York 1993. ISBN 978-3791312484
- Igor Sacharow-Ross: Arbeitsplatz. Edited by Kunstverein Rosenheim. Text by Annelie Pohlen, Petra Giloy-Hirtz. Rosenheim 1994.
- Igor Sacharow-Ross. Feuer und Fest / Fire and Festival. Edited by Petra Giloy-Hirtz. Text by Vladimir Sorokin, Fasil Iskander, Jewgeni Popow, Viktor Kriwulin, Igor P. Smirnov, Boris Groys, Petra Giloy-Hirtz. Hatje Cantz, Ostfildern 1994. ISBN 978-3893222735
- Igor Sacharow-Ross: Reanimation. Edited by Evelyne-Dorothée Allemand. Text by Engelbert Broich, André Comte-Sponville, Hubertus Gaßner, Ernst Pöppel, Jürgen Raap, Eva Ruhnau, Eberhard Stengel. Hatje Cantz, Ostfildern 1997. ISBN 978-3893223497
- Igor Sacharow-Ross: Ausschnitt. Edited by Ralf-Michael Seele. Text by Ralf-Michael Seele, Rüdiger Dahlke, Dietmar Schaberg, Eberhard Stengel. Städtische Galerie ADA Meiningen, Meiningen 1997. ISBN 3-930675-13-7
- Igor Sacharow-Ross: Die Zelle, die Zeit, das Licht. Edited by Bayerische Landesbank International S. A. Text by Evelyn Weiss. Luxembourg 1998.
- Igor Sacharow-Ross: Wartehalle. Edited by Institut Pro Arte St. Petersburg. Text by Igor P. Smirnov, Arkadij Dragomoschtchenko, Ernst Pöppel, Alexander Skidan, Oleg Kireev, Denis Bednik, Alain Badiou, Andrej Bitov, Nadeschda Grigorjeva, Sergej Savjalov, Pavel Klubkov, Dimitrij Golinko-Volfson, Evgenij Maisel, Alexandr Sekratzkij. Levscha, St. Petersburg 2001.
- Igor Sacharow-Ross: SAPIENS / SAPIENS. Edited by Syntopie Ort. Text by Nils Röller, Wladimir Koschaew, Ernst Pöppel, Jan Halcrow, Oleg Kireev, Elisabeth Sikiaridi, Franz Vogelaar, Gabriele Beßler, Josef Riedmiller, Petra Schröck, Jürgen Raap, Jürgen Kisters, Engelbert Broich, Janina Wegner-Keres, Klaus Heid, Thomas Polednitschek, Dieter Buchhart, Florian Falkenstein, Eberhard Stengel, Igor Sacharow-Ross. Salon, Cologne 2002. ISBN 978-3897701557
- Igor Sacharow-Ross: Refugium. Edited by Syntopielabor Cologne. Text by Ernst Pöppel, Kasper Königg, Hans Thomas, Peter Busmann, Ian Halcrow, Cornelia Köster, Valerij Sautschuk, Nadescha Grigorjeva, Igor P. Smirnov, Lilija Brusilowskaja, Igor Kondakov, Elena Plehanowa, Dimitry Bulatov, Oleg Kireev, Schamma Schachadat, Andrey Demitchev, Michael Berg. AHO, Ischevsk 2003. ISBN 5-93972-271-7
- Igor Sacharow-Ross: Abgebrochene Verbindung. Edited by Dieter Buchhart, Hans-Peter Wipplinger. Text by Edith Rabenstein, Dieter Buchhart, Igor Sacharow-Ross, Thomas Zaunschirm, Sabine Schütz, Ernst Pöppel, Eva Ruhnau, Durs Grünbein, Vladimir Sorokin, Alexander Borovsky, Anna Karina Hofbauer. Verlag für moderne Kunst, Nuremberg 2006. ISBN 978-3939738008
- Igor Sacharow-Ross: Syntopia. Edited by Andrea Niehaus and Dieter Ronte. Text by Andrea Niehaus, Dieter Ronte, Susanne Witzgall, Irene Kleinschmidt-Altpeter, Peter Ulrich Hein, Klaus-Peter Speidel, Christoph-Friedrich von Braun, Robert Huber, Ernst Pöppel. Wienand, Cologne 2007. ISBN 978-3879099443
- Igor Sacharow-Ross: Geflechte. Edited by garnitur / Christina Schönborn, Martin Kammerlander (Vienna). Text by Klaus Speidel, Ulrich Stimming, Reinhard Putz, Ernst Pöppel, Alexander Borovsky, Tobias Loemke. Salon, Cologne 2008. ISBN 978-3897702882
- Igor Sacharow-Ross: Nicht gefiltert. Edited by Hans Dünser. Text by Anna Karina Hofbauer, Ernst Pöppel. Verlag für moderne Kunst, Nuremberg 2009. ISBN 978-3-941185-83-8
