= Fang Zengxian =

Chinese painter and art educator (1931–2019)

Fang Zengxian (Chinese: 方增先; 1931 – 3 December 2019) was a Chinese painter and art educator, considered a founder of the Zhe(jiang) style of figure painting. As the director of the Shanghai Art Museum, he founded the Shanghai Biennale in 1996. He also served as Chairman of the Shanghai Artists Association and was elected to the 5th National People's Congress. He won the Lifetime Achievement Award at the 2nd China Fine Art Awards.

== Biography ==
Fang was born in 1931 in Hengxi Town, Lanxi, Zhejiang, Republic of China. His father Fang Zicheng (方自成) was an elementary school teacher, and his mother Zhou Yunque (周云鹊) a housewife.

In July 1949, Fang entered the National Academy of Art (now China Academy of Art) in Hangzhou to study oil painting. After graduation in 1953, he joined the faculty of the academy while also pursuing his graduate studies. In 1954, Fang transferred to the academy's reestablished guohua department and studied traditional Chinese painting methods. This laid a foundation of his style which blends techniques from the West and the East.

Fang became a faculty member of the guohua department in 1955, and spent three months painting at the Mogao Caves in Dunhuang. He taught at the academy until the beginning of the Cultural Revolution in 1966. He and Zhou Changgu, also a 1953 graduate of the academy, became its most influential guohua instructors despite their lack of long apprenticeship considered a crucial part of traditional guohua training. The two young painters began to draw figures from daily life using traditional Chinese techniques, developing a distinctive style called the "Zhe(jiang) School" which greatly influenced modern guohua practices. Their style was further developed by their students such as Liu Wenxi, who disseminated it to other parts of the country.

In 1956, Fang's painting Every Grain Is Hard Work (粒粒皆辛苦) was exhibited in East Germany and appeared on the cover of an art journal in that country. In 1963, he published the book How to Paint Human Figures in Ink Wash (怎样画水墨人物画), which became highly popular. It was reprinted in 1973 with hundreds of thousands of copies.

In 1978, Fang was elected a delegate to the 5th National People's Congress, and proposed the rebuilding of the Huang Binhong Museum and the establishment of the Pan Tianshou Museum. Both proposals received support from the government. He was elected Vice Chairman of the Zhejiang Artists Association in the same year.

Fang transferred to the Shanghai Chinese Painting Academy in 1983 and became its vice president the following year, serving until 1991. In 1985, he was concurrently appointed Director of the Shanghai Art Museum; in this capacity, he founded the Shanghai Biennale in 1996, which has since become a premier art event of Asia. He was elected Chairman of the Shanghai Artists Association in 1999.

In 1989, his painting Mother (母亲) won the silver medal at the 7th National Art Exhibition and the Qi Baishi Prize. He held a major personal art exhibition at the Zhejiang Art Museum in 2009 and the National Art Museum of China in 2010. He was conferred the Lifetime Achievement Award at the 2nd China Fine Art Awards in January 2013.

== Personal life ==
Fang was married to Lu Qihui (卢琪辉), also an artist. He died on 3 December 2019, aged 88.
