= Boris Groys =

Soviet art historian

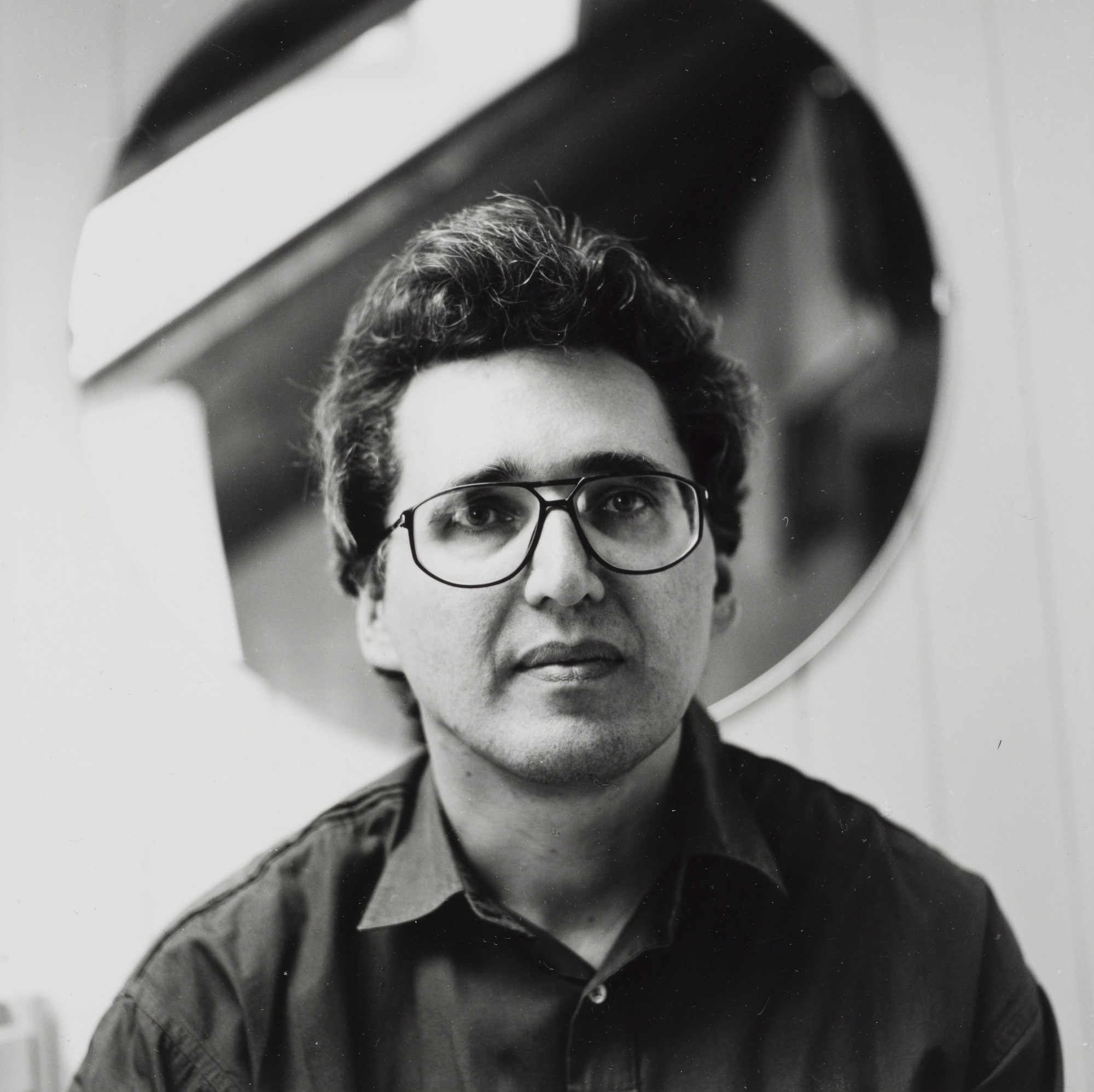
- Born: 19 March 1947 (age 79); East Berlin, Soviet Liberated zone

Philosophical work
- Era: Contemporary philosophy
- Region: Western Philosophy
- School: Continental
- Main interests: Political philosophy, religion, ethics, art theory

Boris Efimovich Groys (born 19 March 1947) is an art critic, media theorist, and philosopher. He is currently a global distinguished professor of Russian and Slavic studies at New York University and senior research fellow at the Karlsruhe University of Arts and Design in Karlsruhe, Germany. He has been a professor of aesthetics, art history, and media theory at the Karlsruhe University of Arts and Design/Center for Art and Media in Karlsruhe and an internationally acclaimed professor at a number of universities in the United States and Europe, including the University of Pennsylvania, the University of Southern California and the Courtauld Institute of Art London.

== Biography ==
Groys was born to Russian parents in the Soviet sector of Berlin, which became the capital of East Germany. He attended high school in Leningrad (known since 1991 as St. Petersburg) and from 1965–1971 studied mathematical logic at the University of Leningrad, subsequently working as a research fellow at various scientific institutes in Leningrad. From 1976-1981 he served as a research fellow at the Institute of Structural and Applied Linguistics at the University of Moscow. In 1981 he emigrated from the USSR to the Federal Republic of Germany, where he pursued various scholarships. He earned a Ph.D. in philosophy at the University of Münster, Germany.

During his time in the Soviet Union, Groys participated in the unofficial cultural scenes of Moscow and Leningrad, publishing in 37, Chasy, and other samizdat magazines. In 1979 he published the essay “Moscow Romantic Conceptualism” in the art magazine A-YA, in which he coined the term applied to the art movement “Moscow Conceptualism.”

Groys is a pioneering theorist in reflection on socialist art and postmodern art, without evaluating either. Western thinkers such as Clement Greenberg had criticized socialist art, especially socialist realism, for being mass art and made it an aesthetic taboo. Groys re-evaluated socialist art production, challenging the norms of aesthetics by pushing a thesis based on Walter Benjamin in the very interpretation of politics, claiming that modernism had survived in the "total artwork" (Gesamtkunstwerk) of Stalinism. This thesis is charged with having pushed a new generation of thinkers into re-evaluating the Socialist aesthetic heritage (among others Miško Šuvaković, Marina Gržinić, and Ana Peraica) recognized as the discourse of post-socialist art.

Groys is a member of the Association Internationale des Critiques d'Art (AICAO), and has served as a fellow of numerous institutions including International Research Center for Cultural Studies (IFK) in Vienna, Austria, Harvard University Art Museum, and the University of Pittsburgh. In 2001 he served as director of the Academy of Fine Arts in Vienna. From 2003 to 2004 he headed the research program Post-Communist Condition in cooperation with Center for Art and Media Karlsruhe and the Federal Cultural Foundation of Germany.

== Selected publications ==
Groys has written over 150 articles on modern and contemporary art and Russian art and intellectual history in several languages. His books include:

- Russian Cosmism (2018)
- In the Flow (2016)
- Introduction to Antiphilosophy (2012)
- The Communist Postscript (2010)
- History Becomes Form: Moscow Conceptualism (2010)
- Going Public (2010)
- Comrades of Time (2009)
- Art Power (2008)
- The Total Enlightenment: Conceptual Art in Moscow 1960-1990 (2008)
- Ilya Kabakov: The Man Who Flew into Space from His Apartment (2006)
- Dream Factory Communism (2004)
- The Total Art of Stalinism (1992)
- Igor Sacharow-Ross: Apotropikon (1991)

Groys has also published Thinking in Loop: Three Videos on Iconoclasm, Ritual and Immortality (DVD, 2008). The videos were produced between 2002 and 2007. Each of these videos combines a theoretical text written and spoken by the author with film footage fragments taken from different movies and film documentations.

== Curatorial activities ==
Groys has curated numerous exhibitions, including

- Fluchtpunkt Moskau at Ludwig Forum (1994 Aachen, Germany)
- Dream Factory Communism at the Schirn Gallery (2003-2004 Frankfurt, Germany)
- Privatizations at the KW Institute of Contemporary Art (2004 Berlin, Germany)
- Total Enlightenment: Conceptual Art in Moscow 1960–1990 (2008-2009 at Kunsthalle Schirn in Frankfurt, Germany, and Fondacion March in Madrid, Spain)
- Medium Religion with Peter Weibel at the Center for Art and Media Karlsruhe, (2009 Karlsruhe, Germany)
- Andrei Monastyrski for the Russian Pavilion at the 54th Venice Biennale, 2011
- After History: Alexandre Kojève as a Photographer, 20 May–15 July 2012 at BAK Utrecht (NL)
