= Miško Šuvaković =

Miodrag Šuvaković
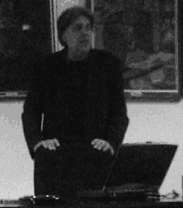
- Born: February 24, 1954 (age 71); Belgrade, PR Serbia, Yugoslavia

Philosophical work
- Era: 20th / 21st-century philosophy
- Region: Western Philosophy
- School: Analytical aesthetics, Poststructuralism, Critical theory, Discursive analysis, Media studies

Miško Šuvaković (Serbian Cyrillic: Мишко Шуваковић; born 24 February 1954) is a contemporary aestheticist, art theorist and conceptual artist in Belgrade, Yugoslavia. He taught theory of art and theory of culture in Interdisciplinary Postgraduates Studies at the University of Arts in Belgrade. He teaches theory of art and theory of culture in transdisciplinary master and doctoral studies at the Faculty of media and communication.

== Biography ==
He was co-founder and member of conceptual artistic Group 143 (1975–1980), and was co-founder and member of informal theoretic and artistic "Community for Space Investigation" (1982–1989). He has participated in TkH – theory platform from October 2000. From 1988 he is the member of Slovenian Aesthetic Society. In March 1993 he got PhD degree with theme "Analytical philosophy and Theory in Art" (Faculty of Visual Arts, Belgrade, University of Arts in Belgrade ). He teaches aesthetics and theory of art, Faculty of Music, Belgrade (Professor). He was co-editor of magazine Katalog 143 (Belgrade, 1975–78), Mentalni prostor (Belgrade, 1982–1987), Transkatalog (Novi Sad, 1995–1998), Teorija koja hoda (Walking Theory, Belgrade, from 2001), Kultura (Beograd, from 2004), Razlika (Difference, Tuzla, 2002), Anomalija (Novi Sad, 2004), Sarajevske sveske (Sarajevo, Zagreb, Ljubljana, Beograd, Skoplje, 2006).

== Books ==
- 2010 Istorija umetnosti u Srbiji XX vek - Prvi tom: Radikalne umetničke prakse, Orion art, Beograd (srp.)
- 2006 Diskurzivna analiza – Prestupi i/ili pristupi ’diskurzivne analize’ filozofiji, poetici, estetici, teoriji i studijama umetnosti i kulture, Univerzitet umetnosti u Beogradu, Beograd, (srp.)
- 2006 Farenhajt 387 – Teorijske ispovesti, Orpheus, Novi Sad, (srp.)
- 2006 Studije slučaja – Diskurzivna analiza izvođenja identiteta u umetničkim praksama, Mali Nemo, Pančevo, (srp.)
- 2005 Pojmovnik suvremene umjetnosti, Horetzky, Zagreb, 2005. (hrv.)
- 2005 Mapiranje tijela/tijelom – Zlatko Kopljar [Mapping of the Body/with body], Meandar, Zagreb (hrv. engl.)
- 2004 Politike slikarstva, Obalne galerije, Piran, 2004. (slov.)
- 2003 Impossible Histories – Historical Avant-Gardes, Neo-avant-gardes, and Post-Avant-gardes in Yugoslavia, 1918–1991, The MIT Press, Cambridge MA, (sa Dubravkom Đurić) (engl.)
- 2003 Vlasta Delimar - Monografijaperformans [Vlasta Delimar - Monographyperformance], Areagrafika, Zagreb (sa Vladom Martekom i Marijanom Špoljarom) (hrv. engl.)
- 2002 Martek – Fatalne figure umjetnika – Eseji o umjetnosti i kulturi XX. stoljeća u Jugoistiočnoj. Istočnoj i Srednjoj Europi kroz djelo(vanje) umjentika Vlade Marteka [Martek – Artist’s Fatal Figures – Essays on Art and Culture of the 20th Century in the Southeastern, Eastern and Middle Europe through the Work of Artist Vlado Martek], Meandar, Zagreb, (hrv. engl.)
- 2001 Anatomija angelov. Razprave o umetnosti in teoriji v Sloveniji po letu 1960, ZPS, Ljubljana, 2001. (slov.)
- 2001 Figura, askeza in perverzija, Hyperion, Koper, 2001. (slov.)
- 2001 Paragrami tela/figure: Predavanja i rasprave o strategijama i taktikama teorijskog izvođenja u modernom i postmodernom performance artu, teatru, operi, muzici, filmu i tehnoumetnosti, CENPI, Beograd, (srp.)
- 2000 Point de Capiton. Eseji, fragmenti i meditacije o umjetnicima, Izdanje Darko Šimičić i Božidar Raos, Zagreb, (hrv.)
- 1999 Pojmovnik moderne i postmoderne likovne umetnosti i teorije posle 1950, SANU i Prometej, Beograd i Novi Sad, (srp.)
- 1999 Koloman Novak LUMINOKINETIKA. Eseji o Kolomanu Novaku [Koloman Novak LUMINOCINETICS, Essays on Koloman Nopvak], Prometej, Novi Sad, (srp. engl.)
- 1998 Estetika apstraktnog slikarstva. Apstraktna umetnost i teorija umetnika 20-ih godina, Narodna knjiga–Alfa, Beograd, (srp.)
- 1997 Slavko Bogdanović POLITIKA TELA. Eseji o Slavku Bogdanoviću [Slavko Bogdanović BODY POLITICS, Essays on Slavko Bogdanović], Prometej i K21K, Novi Sad, *1997. (srp. engl.)
- 1996 Asimetrični drugi. Eseji o umetnicima i konceptima, Prometej, Novi Sad, (srp.)
- 1996 Neša Paripović AUTOPORTRETI. Eseji o Neši Paripoviću [Neša Paripović, SELFPORTRAITS. Essays on Neša Paripović], Prometej, Novi Sad, (srp. engl.)
- 1995 Postmoderna (73 pojma), Narodna knjiga, Beograd, (srp.)
- 1995 Prolegomena za analitičku estetiku, Četvrti talas, Novi Sad, (srp.)
- 1994 PAS TOUT - Fragments on art, culture, politics, poetics and art theory 1994-1974, Meow Press, Buffalo NY, (engl.)
- 1989 Scene jezika. Uloga teksta u likovnim umetnostima. Fragmentarne istorije 1920-1990 knj. 1 i 2, ULUS, Beograd, (srp.)

== Curatorial works ==
- 2007 Konceptualna umetnost, Muzej savremene umentosti Vojvodine, Novi Sad.
- 2006 Hibridno – Imaginarno : slikarstvo ili ekran, Muzej savremene umetnosti Vojvodine, Novi Sad.
- 2005 Moć Praznine – Julije Knifer i Tomo Savić Gecan, Galerija PM, Zagreb.
- 2004 Politike slikarstva, Obalne galerije, Piran.
- 1998 Prestupničke forme devedesetih – Postmoderna i avangarda na kraju XX veka, (sa Ješom Denegrijem), Muzej savremene likovne umetnosti Novi Sad i Centar za savremenu kulturu Konkordija Vršac.
- 1996 Tendencije devedesetih: hijatusi modernizma i postmodernizma, Centar za vizuelnu kulturu ‘Zlatno oko’, Novi Sad.
- 1996 Primeri apstraktne umetnosti: jedna radikalna istorija, Paviljon Cvijete Zuzorić, Beograd.
- 1995 Grupa Kod, Grupa ($ i Grupa ($ Kod – Retrospektiva, Galerija savremene likovne umetnosti, Novi Sad.
- 1981 David Nez – Rad 1968-1973, Gakerija SKCa, Beograd.
- 1980 Primeri – druga skulptura 1961-1979, Galerija SKCa, Beograd.
- 1978 Primeri analitičkih radova, Galerija SKCa i Galerija Nova, Zagreb.

== Essays ==
- „Serbia as a Symptom of the Balkans: Internationalism & Globalization", East European Film Bulletin, Paris, 2012.
- „Epostemology of Teaching Art – How to Learn / Teach Art – Yes or No ...How and Where!?", from "Art in the grip of education", Maska no. 103-104, Ljubljana, 2007.
- "Technologies of Performing in Performance Art", TkH no. 10, Beograd, 2006.
- "Indexing and Mapping Modern and Postmodern Art in Serbia after 1945", from Irwin (eds), East Art Map – Contemporary Art and Eastern Europe, Afterall, London, 2006.
- "Critical Question About Deconstruction or About DeCentring of the Relation Between *Philosophy and Music", in Leon Stefanija (ed), Musicological Annual XLI / 2, Ljubljana", 2005.
- "Theoretical Performance", Maska no. 90-91, Ljubljana, 2005.
- "NSK Symptom", from Art and Politics – The Imagination of Opposition in Europe, R4 publishing, Dublin i The Ministry of Foreign Affairs of the Republic of Slovenia, 2004.
- „Art as a Political Machine: Fragments on the Late Socialist and Postsocialist Art of Mitteleuropa and the Balkans", from Aleš Erjavec (ed), Postmodernism and the Postsocijalist Condition – Politized Art under Late Socialism, University of California Press, Berkeley, 2003.
- "The Limits of Discourse: A Lecture on Relationship between Theory and Body in the XX Century", Filozofski vesnik XXIII, 2/2002, ZRC SAZU, Ljubljana, 2002.
- "Belgrade", iz Timothy O. Benson (ed), Central European Avant-Gardes: Exchange and Transformation, 1910–1930, LACMA Los Angeles i The MIT Press Cambridge Mass, 2002.
- "The Ideology of Exhibition: on the ideologies of Manifesta", Platforma SCCA no.3, Ljubljana, 2002.
- "Critical Phenomenology of Artwork: The Status, the Functions and the Effects of the Artwork at Manifesta 3", Platforma SCCA no. 2, Ljubljana, 2000.
- "Status and priorities. A pre-consideration for Manifesta 3", Platforma SCCA no. 1, Ljubljana, 2000.
- "Painting After Painting: The Painting od Susan Bee", from M/E/A/N/I¬/N.G – An Anthology of Artists’ Writings, Theory, and Criticism, Duke University Press, Durham, London, 1995.
- "Advocates: Art and Philosophy. Approaching the ‘Relations’ of Philosophy and Art in the 20th Century", from XIVth International Congress of Aesthetics "Aesthetics as Philosophy" * Proceedings - Part I - Introductory and Invited Papers, u Filozofski vestnik št. 2, ZRC SAZU, Ljubljana, 1999, str. 111-126.

== TV programs ==
- Video pojmovnik umetnosti i teorije XX veka [Video Dictionary: Art and Theory in 20th Century] (22 shows), ART TV, Beograd, 2000-2001.
