= Russian postmodernism =

Russian postmodernism refers to the cultural, artistic, and philosophical condition in Russia since the downfall of the Soviet Union and dialectical materialism. With respect to statements about post-Soviet philosophy or sociology, the term is primarily used by non-Russians to describe the state of economic and political uncertainty they observe since the fall of communism and the way this uncertainty affects Russian identity. 'Postmodernism' is, however, a term often used by Russian critics to describe contemporary Russian art and literature.

== Artistic and literary origins ==
In art, postmodernism entered the Soviet Union in the 1950s after the end of the Stalinist move toward liberalization with the advent of the Russian conceptualist movement. Beginning as an underground political-artistic move against the use of Socialist realism as a method of social control and becoming a full-fledged movement with the Moscow Conceptualists, Russian conceptualism used the symbolism of Socialist realism against the Soviet government. Its representatives were artists Ilya Kabakov, Irina Nakhova, Viktor Pivovarov, Eric Bulatov, Andrei Monastyrski, Komar and Melamid, poets Vsevolod Nekrasov, Dmitri Prigov, Lev Rubinstein, Timur Kibirov, and writer Vladimir Sorokin.

The members of Lianozovo Group formed in 1958 and named after the small village Lianozovo outside Moscow, were its leader, the artist and poet Evgenii Kropivnitsky, the artists Olga Potapova, Oscar Rabin, Lidia Masterkova, Vladimir Nemukhin, Nikolai Vechtomov, and the poets Igor Kholin, Vsevolod Nekrasov, and Genrikh Sapgir.

The Metarealists, namely metaphysical realists, in the 1970s–90s unofficial postmodern Soviet and Russian poetry, who all used complex metaphors which they called meta-metaphors. Their representatives are Konstantin Kedrov, Elena Katsyuba, Elena Shvarts, Ivan Zhdanov, Vladimir Aristov, Aleksandr Yeryomenko, Yuri Arabov, and Alexei Parshchikov.

== Members ==
Literature

- Yuri Arabov (1954–2023)
- Andrei Bitov (1937–2018)
- Sergei Dovlatov (1941–1990)
- Arkadii Dragomoshchenko (1946–2012)
- Mikhail Elizarov (b. 1973)
- Dmitry Glukhovsky (b. 1979)
- Igor Kholin (1920–1999)
- Eduard Limonov (1943–2020)
- Vladimir Nabokov (1899–1977)
- Alexei Parshchikov (1954–2009)
- Alexander Prokhanov (b. 1938)
- Victor Pelevin (b. 1962)
- Lyudmila Petrushevskaya (b. 1938)
- Valery Popov (b. 1939)
- Yevgeni Popov (b. 1946)
- Dmitry Prigov (1940–2007)
- Lev Rubinstein (1947–2024)
- Nina Sadur (1950–2023)
- Genrikh Sapgir (1928–1999)
- Vladimir Sharov (1952–2018)
- Elena Shvarts (1949–2010)
- Sasha Sokolov (b. 1943)
- Vladimir Sorokin (b. 1955)
- Tatyana Tolstaya (b. 1951)
- Venedikt Yerofeyev (1938–1990)
- Viktor Yerofeyev (b. 1947)

== See also ==
- History of the Soviet Union (1953–1964)
- History of the Soviet Union (1964–1982)
- History of the Soviet Union (1982–1991)
- History of post-Soviet Russia
- Mark Lipovetsky
- Modernism
- Postmodernism
- Russian literature
- Socialist realism
- Soviet nonconformist art
