= Sots Art =

Artistic movement

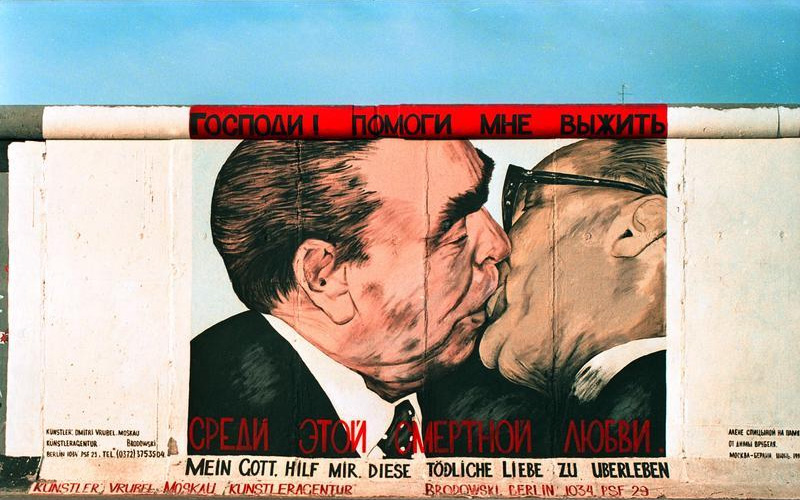
My God, Help Me to Survive This Deadly Love by Dmitri Vrubel on Berlin Wall, 1991

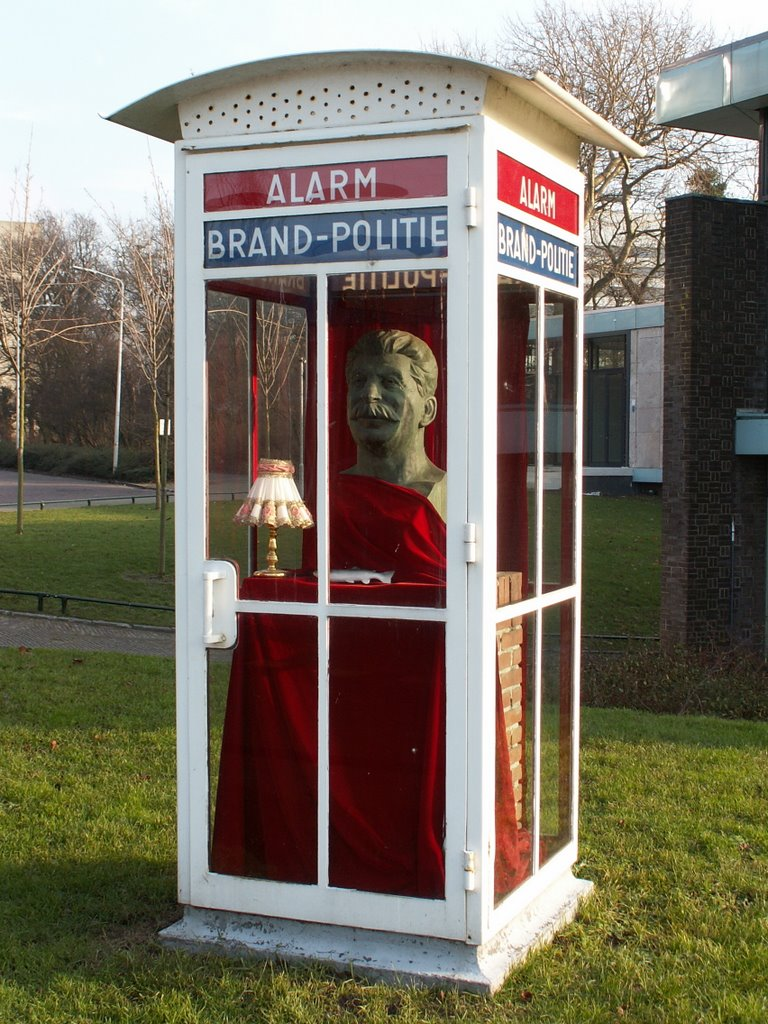
Stalin Monument In The Hague by Komar and Melamid

Often referred to as “Soviet Pop Art”, Sots Art or Soc Art (Russian: Соц-арт, short for Socialist Art) originated in the Soviet Union during the period dubbed the "Era of Stagnation", under Leonid Brezhnev's leadership (1964-1982) as a reaction against the official aesthetic doctrine of the state— socialist realism, which was marked by reverential depictions of workers, peasants living happily in their communes. The goal of Sots Art was to fight against the bureaucratic manipulation and state propaganda by deconstructing myths and stereotypes from the previous art movement as well as how official art limited artists expression. Sots Art often portrayed taboo subjects as an opposition to the communistic regime.

According to Arthur Danto, Sots Art's attack on official styles is similar in intent to American pop art and German capitalist realism. Both of those movements took the mass media and popular culture of the time and made it into art pieces that convey an anti-capitalist view. This idea is then mimicked in Sots Art as artists took the art style popular during the “Era of Stagnation” and used it to protest this limitation on artists freedom of expression. This connection between Pop Art and Sots Art is intentional by its creators as they used the word “Soviet” from “Soviet Realism” and the English word for “art” to create the movement’s title.

Sots Art went against the popular art genre of socialist realism by changing the style to include elements from American Pop Art such as consumer products. In addition to this use of American Pop Art, the Sots movement also used unconventional materials as a way of going against official art of the time, such as using found objects and deconstructed text. Sots Art opposed Socialist Realism through material and capitalist images. It was then placed beside Socialist Realism art to lower it to the same level as its own works.

This comparison between Sots Art and Socialist Realism can be found in the 1998 University of Minnesota exhibition at the Fredrick R. Weisman Art Museum.

== Origin ==
Vitaly Komar and Alexander Melamid are credited with the invention of the term "Sots Art". It was made as an analogy with the Western Pop Art movement, which incorporated the kitchy elements of the Western mass culture, Sots Art capitalized on the imagery of the Socialist mass culture. The first paintings made in the Sots Art style by Vitaly Komar and Alexander Melamid were made in 1960s. These works include Portraits of the Artists’ Wives, Portrait of Father, and A Double Self Portrait.

Sots Art's primary strategy was to ironically appropriate the heroic and idealized visual language of Soviet propaganda—including its symbols, slogans, and portraits of leaders—and subversively juxtapose it with the aesthetics of Western mass culture, advertising, and kitsch. Through Komar and Melamids joint anti-Socialist Art, this movement became known as a private code which they used to joke about Socialism through the combination of symbols and art styles.

== Artists ==
- Grisha Bruskin
- Eric Bulatov
- Ilya Kabakov
- Vitaly Komar
- Alexander Kosolapov
- Igor Novikov (painter)
- Alexander Melamid
- Dmitri Prigov
- Vadim Sidur
- Leonid Sokov
