= Mikhail Epstein =

Russian-American literary scholar and essayist (born 1950)

Mikhail Naumovich Epstein (Epshtein)
- Михаи́л Нау́мович Эпште́йн
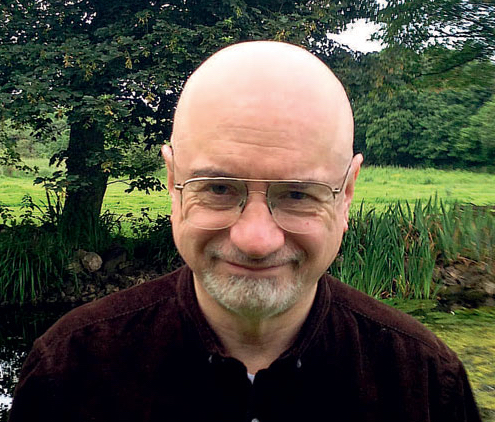
- Epstein in 2014
- Born: 21 April 1950 (age 76); Moscow, Soviet Union
- Education: Moscow State University
- Writing career
- Subjects: Continental philosophy; Mikhail Bakhtin and dialogical poetics; Postmodern theory and conceptualism; Methodology of the humanities; Cultural theory; Postmodernism; Literature, Philosophy, and Religion in Russia; Experimental Genres; Internet and Creativity; Language and Neologisms; Transformative humanities; Post-atheism and minimal religion; Transculture and culturology; Possibilism; Metarealism; Collective improvisations; Projective linguistics
- Website: inteLnet

Mikhail Naumovich Epstein (also transliterated Epshtein; Russian: Михаи́л Нау́мович Эпште́йн; born 21 April 1950) is a Russian-American literary scholar, essayist, and cultural theorist best known for his contributions to the study of Russian postmodernism. He is the Emeritus S. C. Dobbs Professor of Cultural Theory and Russian Literature at Emory University, Atlanta, Georgia. His writings encompass Russian literature and intellectual history, the philosophy of religion, the creation of new ideas in the age of electronic media, semiotics, and interdisciplinary approaches in the humanities. His works have been translated into over 26 languages.

The Modern Language Association of America awarded Epstein the Aldo and Jeanne Scaglione Prize for Studies in Slavic Languages and Literatures for his book Ideas Against Ideocracy: Non-Marxist Thought of the Late Soviet Period (1953–1991) on 6 December 2023.

== Biography ==
Mikhail Naumovich Epstein was born 21 April 1950 in Moscow, USSR, the only child of Naum Moiseevich Epstein, an accountant, and Maria Samuilovna Lifshits, an economist at Transport Publishing House. He graduated from the Department of Philology at Moscow State University in 1972 with a degree in Russian and spent the next six years as a researcher at the Department of Theoretical Problems, World Literature Institute of the Academy of Sciences of the USSR. In 1978, he joined the Union of Soviet Writers. Epstein also began to explore Moscow's underground poetry and art scene of the 1970s, developing a lifelong interest in conceptualism, metarealism, and the cross-cultural interplay of ideas.

Throughout the 1980s, Epstein actively engaged with Moscow's intellectual life. He founded the Essayists' Club in 1982. In 1986, as President Mikhail Gorbachev's policy of Glasnost permitted more open questioning of Soviet cultural orthodoxies, Epstein established the Image and Thought association, which later gave rise to the Bank of New Ideas and Terms and the Laboratory of Contemporary Culture groups in Moscow. He was awarded the St. Petersburg-based Andrei Bely Prize for Research in the Humanities in 1991.

In 1990, Epstein emigrated to the United States, where he spent a semester teaching at Wesleyan University in Middletown, Connecticut, before joining the faculty of the Russian and East Asian Languages and Cultures Department at Emory University in Atlanta, Georgia. Almost immediately, he received a year-long fellowship at the Woodrow Wilson International Center for Scholars(Washington, D.C.) to research Soviet ideological language. Upon his return to Emory, Epstein taught a variety of graduate and undergraduate courses in subjects ranging from literary theory, semiotics, and intellectual history to 19th-and 20th-century Russian literature.

From 1992 to 1994, Epstein researched the history of Russian thought of the late Soviet period thanks to a grant from the National Council for Soviet and East European Research.

In the second half of the 1990s, as the World Wide Web rapidly permeated both academic and popular culture, Epstein embraced the new medium for cross-cultural communication. His internet projects during this time include The InteLnet (Intellectual Network), 1995 "The Book of Books" (since 1998), and "The Gift of a Word: The Projective Lexicon of the Russian Language" (since 2000). InteLnet's Bank of New Ideas was recognized by the Institute for Social Inventions, awarding it the 1995 Creativity Social Innovations Award.

From fall 1999 to the spring of 2001, and again from fall of 2003 to the spring of 2006, Epstein co-chaired the interdisciplinary Gustafson faculty seminar at Emory University.

In the spring of 2011, he was appointed IAS Fellow and Prowse Fellow at Van Mildert College, Durham University Institute of Advanced Study in Durham, U.K. He remained at Durham from 2012 to 2015 as Professor and Founding Director of the Centre for Humanities Innovation, where he founded the Repository of New Ideas.

== Research and scholarship ==
Epstein's research interests in the humanities include postmodernism; contemporary philosophy and theology, in particular the philosophy of culture and language; the poetics and history of Russian literature; the semiotics of everyday life, and the evolution of language.

== Russian postmodernism ==
Epstein pioneered the study of Russian postmodernism, affirming its place in global postmodernity. In his books After the Future: The Paradoxes of Postmodernism and Contemporary Russian Culture (1995) and Russian Postmodernism: New Perspectives on Post-Soviet Culture (with Alexander Genis and Slobodanka Vladiv-Glover, 1999, 2015), he situated Russian fiction, poetry, art and spirituality of the 1970s–1990s both along the continuum of metaphysically oriented metarealism and linguistically self–reflective conceptualism, and in the context of the global postmodern literary-cultural conversation. According to Epstein, the first wave of Russian postmodernism harkened back to Soviet-era socialist realism of the 1930s–1950s, which opposed the "obsolete" aesthetic individualism of modernism, erased distinctions between elite and mass culture, and tried to construct a post-historical space where all the great discourses of the past could be merged and resolved.

Socialist realism managed to erase semantic differences between idea and reality, the signifier and the signified. Despite these commonalities, socialist realism lacked the playful, ironically self-conscious aspect of mature postmodernism. It was not until the late 1950s and again the 1970s that Soviet artists and writers such as Ilya Kabakov, Vitaly Komar, Aleksandr Melamid, Dmitri Prigov, Vsevolod Nekrasov, and others turned a distinctly postmodern, playful, ironic gaze toward the ideological simulations of socialist realism (heroic workers, collective struggle, communal apartment, the glorious communist future, etc.).

Instead of denouncing Soviet ideology as a lie, Russian postmodern writers and artists viewed ideas or concepts in and of themselves as the only true substance of the Soviet way of life. Thus, Epstein presents two separate phases of Russian postmodernism: "naïve" — socialist realism, and "reflective" — conceptualism. These two Russian postmodernisms, in effect, both complement and contradict each other due to a significant historical gap. In contrast, the development of Western postmodernism was more straightforward and less complex, concentrated within a single historical period.

== Transculturalism ==
Epstein has written and lectured extensively on culturology and its outgrowth, transculture. As a distinct field of study, culturology developed in the 1960s–1970s, in parallel to cultural studies in the West and in opposition to the dominant Marxist philosophy of the Soviet era. Advanced from different angles by thinkers such as Mikhail Bakhtin, Juri Lotman, and Sergei Averintsev, culturology investigates, describes, and links diverse cultural phenomena previously approached from separate fields such as history, philosophy, sociology, literary and art criticism. It seeks to rise above social, national, and historical distinctions, examining both "culture" as an integral whole and "cultures" as diverse, infinitely rich and intrinsically valuable sites of encoding human phenomena.

Epstein built on the foundation of culturology with his conception of transculturalism, a conscious liberation from the strictures of one's own specific, inherently incomplete culture and cultivation of a radical openness toward and dialogue with others. For Epstein, emigration provided an opportunity to study the interaction of cultures firsthand. He describes the transcultural model as distinct from both the American "melting pot", in which cultural distinctions are merged and subsumed into a national norm, and multiculturalism, which posits pride in discrete cultural identities based on racial, ethnic, or sexual differences. According to Epstein, "Transculture is an emerging sphere where humans position themselves free from the limitations of the primary culture(s) of their home environment. The elements of transculture are freely chosen by people rather than dictated by rules and prescriptions within their given cultures." Transculture acknowledges the need to see the self in the other, allowing the multiplication of possible worlds, a boundless fluidity of discourses, values, and knowledge systems that would embrace difference rather than seek to obliterate it.

This insight inspired Epstein to revisit the collective improvisation events he had conducted at the Club of Essayists and Center for Experimental Creativity in Moscow in the 1980s. Epstein held similar "collective brainstorming" events as laboratory models of transcultural activity at Bowling Green State University (1996), the international conference "The Future of the Humanities. International School of Theory in Humanities", Santiago de Compostela University (1997) and Emory University (1998–2004). These participatory improvisational sessions aimed to "explore creativity, technology, and the role of spirituality in everyday mental processes".

== Minimal religion / "poor faith" ==
Epstein's research on post-Soviet Russian cultural and spiritual conditions brought him to the concept of "minimal religion", a phenomenon of post-atheist religiosity originating in the first country to experience 70 years of mass, state-sanctioned atheism. Apart from the significant number of Russians who turned to traditional Russian Orthodox practice or other faiths (Judaism, Protestant Christianity, Islam, etc.) in the 1970s–1990s, roughly a quarter of Russian poll respondents profess a general belief in God that is unaffiliated with any organized church or religious doctrine. In abandoning atheism, these "minimal believers" seek to fill a spiritual void with a holistic view of God, above and beyond the historic divisions and prescriptive rituals of organized religion. However, in contrast to Western secular humanism or agnosticism, Epstein posits minimal religion in Russia as essentially theistic. His term "poor faith" refers not to inadequacy but freedom from the material trappings of traditional religions: possessions, buildings, ritual objects, and intermediaries between the individual and God. The minimal believer possesses only faith in the here and now, without any institutional forms or organizations (as distinct from Protestant denominations).

Furthermore, Epstein emphasizes that Soviet mass atheism was a necessary prerequisite to the rebirth of faith in the form of minimal religion. "Atheism had used the diversity of religions to argue for the relativity of religion. Consequently, the demise of atheism signaled the return to the simplest, virtually empty, and infinite form of monotheism and monofideism. If God is one, then faith must be one."

== Transformative humanities ==
Epstein advocates for the importance of the humanities and their transformative potential. In a time of increasing focus on STEM (science, technology, engineering, math) subjects, Epstein's work asserts that the humanities can play a vital role in shaping the future of society: "The future-oriented humanities must not limit themselves to scholarship, but rather should seek to create their own ways to change what they study, to transform the human world." According to Epstein, an educational program uniting major fields of the humanities could be established under the acronym PILLAR: philosophy, intellectual history, language, literature, art, religion. Rather than teach the six humanistic disciplines as separate and discrete subjects, PILLAR integrates them into a cohesive learning paradigm based on real-world and future–oriented applications. As a transdisciplinary strategy complementary to STEM, PILLAR integrates not only traditional areas of the humanities but also scholarship and inventorship.

Epstein envisions transformative humanities (or transhumanities) as a practical means of transforming culture, much like technology serves as a practical application of the natural sciences and politics does with the social sciences. Constructively, transhumanities might include building new intellectual communities, initiating new artistic movements, creating new modes of communication, and developing new paradigms of thought, rather than simply studying or criticizing the products of culture.

In his book The Transformative Humanities: a Manifesto (2012) Epstein contends that the scholarly discipline of the humanities as it exists requires radical, innovative ideas from outside the halls of academic privilege to disrupt stale habits of thought and infuse the humanities with a "proto-global mentality".

Freed from externally imposed cultural imperatives, humanities programs could expand their scope of research into areas more attuned to the techno-scientific challenges of the twenty-first century. Practical and experimental branches of newly invented fields might include "humanology" ("the ecology of humans and the anthropology of machines"); "ecophilology" (the study of the role of textual environments), "micronics" (the study of the qualitative meaning of the smallest entities and of the miniaturization of things); and "horrorology", the study of the self-destructive mechanisms of civilization, which make it susceptible to all forms of terrorism and "horrification", including its biological and technological forms.

== Possibilism, philosophy, and technology ==
Epstein defines the general direction of his work as the creation of multiple alternatives to the dominant sign systems and theoretical models—what he calls "possibilism". Along this path, "thinkable worlds" emerge—philosophical systems, religious and artistic movements, life orientations, new words, terms and concepts, new disciplines and forms of humanitarian research. Possibilism assumes that a thing or event acquires meaning only in the context of its possibilities—may be as opposed to is. The potentiality cannot be reduced to either actuality or necessity. A world consisting solely of actualities would lack meaning and significance. He proposes the discipline of potentiology as a burgeoning branch of metaphysics, one that concentrates on potentiality and complements the established branches of ontology and epistemology.

Expanding his "transformative" and "possibilistic" methodology, Epstein developed a project of "synthetic", or constructive philosophy, in contrast to the analytic tradition dominant in modern Western thought. The turning point from analysis to synthesis is the problematization of the elements identified in the analysis, their criticism, replacement, or rearrangement, leading to the construction of alternative concepts and propositions that expand the field of the thinkable and doable. This lays foundation to the synthesis of philosophy and technology, "technosophia" (the metaphysics applied to the construction of virtual worlds). Technology of the 21st century is not merely instrumental/utilitarian, but a fundamental technology ("onto–technology"), which, thanks to science's penetration into the micro- and macrocosm, can change the foundational parameters of being, thereby acquiring a philosophical dimension. Accordingly, philosophy as a study of the general principles of the universe becomes a prerequisite in any "world-forming", synthesizing acts of technology, including the design of computer games and multi-populated virtual worlds (e.g., "Second Life" and "Meta"), that involve a new ontology, logic, ethics, and axiology. The vocation of philosophy in the 21st century is not just to comprehend our world, but to lay the foundations for new world-forming practices, to initiate and design the ontology of possible worlds, and to pave the way for alternative forms of synthetic life and artificial intelligence. Contrary to Hegel, philosophy is no longer the "owl of Minerva" taking flight at dusk, but a skylark proclaiming the dawn of a new "technosophical" age.

== Projective dictionaries and neologisms ==
Epstein's work is often characterized by his use of neologisms and their lexical predecessors, protologisms—neologisms that have not yet been accepted as useful or substantiated additions to the vocabulary. His own term for this process of word-creation is "Lexicopeia", a literary genre that involves combining specific morphemes into new, meaningful words for previously undefined concepts.

In his PreDictionary (Atelos, 2011), Epstein explores the creative potential of neologisms the formative role played by the blank spaces in language. Applying the transformative humanities concept to linguistics, Epstein embraces a shift from analyzing existing language to synthesizing new words that in turn generate new concepts and meanings. For example, one entry in the PreDictionary is "Lexipoem"—that is, a poem consisting of a single word, or lexical unit.

Epstein expanded on this philological—linguistic and philosophical—methodology in a later book, Proektivnyi slovar' gumanitarnykh nauk [A Projective Dictionary of the Humanities] (Moscow: Novoe Literaturnoe Obozrenye, 2017; published in Russian), which brings together over 400 newly coined concepts in the humanities, philosophy, culturology, aesthetics, linguistics, religious studies, and other emerging disciplines. The dictionary contains a systematic description of the concepts and terms of the humanities, covering philosophy (including ethics and aesthetics), cultural studies, religious studies, linguistics, literary studies, as well as humanitarian approaches to nature, history, society, and technology.

== History of Russian philosophy ==
Epstein interrogates the common perception of Russian philosophy as a mere reflection of Western philosophy, with few original ideas to contribute. He views Russia as a philosophical nation in a more fundamental, comprehensive sense: "Perhaps no other nation in the world [has] so totally surrendered its social, cultural, and even economic life to the demands of philosophical concepts."

Epstein's analysis places particular emphasis on two opposing tendencies peculiar to Russian thought and evident throughout the country's history. The first tendency uses generalization and unification to transform social and cultural reality, leading eventually to ideocracy and totalitarianism, while the second promotes the unsurpassable value of individuality, revealing the relativity and futility of all general ideological constructs.

The first tendency, developed in the 19th century in various manifestations ("sobornost', Vladimir Solovyov's "total unity", the back-to-the-land movement, etc.), lost its inspirational force as it merged with official Soviet ideology. It began to decline in the 1950s and had almost disappeared from philosophy by the late 1980s. The second tendency (including concepts such as personalism, conceptualism, polyphony, and many others) reached the height of its influence in the post-Soviet period. Epstein argues that the contrast and interplay between these two tendencies—generalization, totalitarianism, and utopianism versus individualization, personalism, and conceptualism—define the peculiar character of Russian thought and its contribution to world philosophy.

In his two-volume investigation of Russian philosophy of the late Soviet period (1950s–1980s) Epstein concludes that Russian intellectual history of the 20th century is a history of thought struggling desperately to escape the prison of an ideocratic system created by the strenuous and sacrificial efforts of thought itself. Тhe Russian 'intelligentsia', or intellectual elite, opposed 'ideocracy', the rule by ideology; yet, the intelligentsia's own thinking inadvertently gave rise to ideocracy. This self-defeating cycle of thought not only undermines its own premises but also imparts an unprecedented, paradoxical, and at times tragically sarcastic character to Russian philosophy."

The second book, Ideas Against Ideocracy: Non-Marxist Thought of the Late Soviet Period (1953–1991), became the cowinner of the Aldo and Jeanne Scaglione Prize for Studies in Slavic Languages and Literatures awarded by Modern Language Association MLA, 2023).

== Current war events in Russkii Antimir (Russian Antiworld) (2023) ==
Russia's invasion of Ukraine in February 2022 crystalized many of Epstein's thoughts on the progression of Russian civilization. In his book Русский Анти-мир: Политика на Грани Апокалипсиса (Russian Anti-World: Politics on the Brink of Apocalypse) (2023; published in Russian), Epstein examines the war through a philosophical lens.

In the book, Epstein states that the Kremlin's slogan "Russkii mir" (Russian world), referring to an ever-widening sphere of Russian territory and influence set in opposition to the decadent, "satanic" West, exemplifies a radical ideological rhetoric (including open nuclear threats) not seen even during the Soviet era. Russian politicians and propagandists idealize a mythologized "great empire" of the past (both Tsarist and Soviet) that is incompatible with the modern world. Rather than develop their own civilizational project for Russia, Vladimir Putin and his allies define the "Russian world" only as an "anti-world": a negation of the West and all it stands for. Epstein believes that in the rhetoric surrounding Russia's "special military operation" in Ukraine, the "Russian world" emerges as the antithesis to the modern world; it negates modern ideals such as peace, modern geopolitical norms such as territorial sovereignty, modern notions about the separation of church and state, international humanitarian law; it even inverts conceptual definitions of terms such as "war" and "fascism".

Epstein defines the ideological framework of Russia's invasion of Ukraine as "schizofascism", or "fascism disguised as a struggle against fascism"; "an entire worldview that combines the theory of moral, ethnic or racial superiority, divine mission, imperialism, nationalism, xenophobia, aspiration to superpower, anti-capitalism, anti-democracy, anti-liberalism".

The intensifying apocalyptic rhetoric of Putin's regime permeates Russian culture internally and externally. While the explicit threat of nuclear annihilation at Russia's hands hangs over the world, Russian Orthodox church leaders, as part of the state apparatus, preach apocalyptic notions that equate losing Ukraine to the "end of the world". Epstein interprets these as threats not only against the non-Russian "other" but ultimately, against the Russian people themselves, who are systematically deprived of basic freedoms, factual information, meaningful political choices, material goods, and ultimately their lives, as more and more young men are conscripted to be used as cannon fodder on the battlefield.

== Bibliography ==
=== Books and monographs ===
==== In English ====
- Ideas Against Ideocracy: Non-Marxist Thought of the Late Soviet Period (1953–1991). New York and London: Bloomsbury Academic, 2022, 280 pp. ISBN 978-1-5013-5059-7
- The Phoenix of Philosophy: Russian Thought of the Late Soviet Period (1953–1991). New York and London: Bloomsbury Academic, 2019, 312 pp. ISBN 978-1-5013-1639-5
- A Philosophy of the Possible: Modalities in Thought and Culture. Translated from Russian by Vern W. McGee and Marina Eskina. Boston, Leiden et al.: Brill Academic Publishers (Value Inquiry Book Series, Vol. 333), 2019, 365 pp. ISBN 978-90-04-39834-4
- The Irony of the Ideal: Paradoxes of Russian Literature. Translated by A. S. Brown. Boston: Academic Studies Press, 2017, 438 pp. ISBN 978-1-61811-982-7
- Russian Postmodernism: New Perspectives on Post-Soviet Culture. Translated by Slobodanka Vladiv-Glover (Rev. ed.). New York; Oxford: Berghahn Books. 2016 [1999]. ISBN 978-1-78238-864-7. (with Alexander Genis and Slobodanka Vladiv-Glover) 578 pp.
- The Transformative Humanities: A Manifesto. New York and London: Bloomsbury Academic, 2012, 318 pp. ISBN 978-1-4411-5507-8
- PreDictionary: An Exploration of Blank Spaces in Language. San Francisco: Atelos, 2011, 155 pp. ISBN 1-891190-34-2
- Russian Spirituality and the Secularization of Culture. New York: FrancTireur-USA, 2011, 135 pp. ISBN 978-1-257-85060-0
- Cries in the New Wilderness: from the Files of the Moscow Institute of Atheism. Translation and introduction by Eve Adler. Philadelphia: Paul Dry Books, 2002, 236 pp. ISBN 0-9679675-4-6
- Transcultural Experiments: Russian and American Models of Creative Communication (with Ellen Berry). New York: Palgrave MacMillan, 1999, 340 pp. ISBN 0-312-21808-7
- After the Future: The Paradoxes of Postmodernism and Contemporary Russian Culture (a volume in the series Critical Perspectives on Modern Culture, introduction and translation by Anesa Miller-Pogacar), Amherst: The University of Massachusetts Press, 1995, 392 pp. Hardcover and paperback editions. Electronic edition, Boulder, Colo.: NetLibrary, Inc., 2000. ISBN 0-585-15509-7
- Relativistic Patterns in Totalitarian Thinking: An Inquiry into the Language of Soviet Ideology. Kennan Institute for Advanced Russian Studies, Occasional Paper, No.243. Washington: The Woodrow Wilson International Center for Scholars, 1991, 94 pp.

==== In English and Russian ====
- Amerussia: Selected essays. / Amerossiia. Izbrannaia esseistika. (parallel texts in English and Russian). Moscow: Serebrianye niti, 2007, 504 pp.
- The Constructive Potential of the Humanities. / Konstruktivnyi potential gumanitarnykh nauk. Moscow, Russian State University of the Humanities, 2006, 74 pp.

==== In Russian ====
===== Scholarly works =====
- Pervoponiatiia: Kliuchi k kul'turnomu kodu (Primary Concepts: Keys to the Cultural Code). Moscow: Kolibri, Azbuka–Attikus, 2022 (July), 720 pp. ISBN 978-5-389-15248-9
- Filosofskii proektivnyi slovar'. Novye terminy i poniatiya. Vypusk 2 (Philosophical projective dictionary. New terms and concepts. Volume 2). Coeditor (with G. L. Tulchinsky), and the author of 143 entries (out of 200). St. Petersburg: Aleteia, 2020 (July), 544 pp. ISBN 978-5-00165-110-9
- Homo Scriptor. Sbornik statei i materialov v chest' 70–letiia Mikhaila Epshteina (Homo Scriptor: A Collection of Articles and Materials in Honor of Mikhail Epstein's 70th Anniversary). FESTSCHRIFT. Compiled and edited by Mark Lipovetsky. Moscow: Novoe literaturnoe obozrenie, 2020, 688 pp. Authored, coauthored or compiled pp. 536–669 in this edition (letters, interviews, bibliography and chronology). ISBN 978-5-4448-1202-0
- Postmodernizm v Rossii (Postmodernism in Russia). St. Petersburg: Azbuka (the series "New Cultural Code"), 2019, 608 pp. ISBN 978-5-389-15249-6
- Revised and Expanded edition of Postmodern v russkoi literature (The Postmodern in Russian Literature). Moscow: Vysshaia shkola, 2005, 495 pp.
- Budushchee gumanitarnykh nauk: Tekhnogumanizm, kreatorika, erotologiia, elektronnaia filologiia i drugie nauki XXI veka. (The Future of the Humanities: Technohumanism, Creatorics, Erotology, Digital Philology and Other Disciplines of the XXI c.). Moscow: Ripol–klassik, 2019, 240 pp. ISBN 978-5-386-12485-4
- Proektivnyi slovar' gumanitarnykh nauk (The Projective Dictionary of the Humanities). Moscow: Novoe literaturnoe obozrenie, 2017, 616 pp. ISBN 978-5-4448-0632-6
- Ot znania k tvorchestvu. Kak gumanitarnye nauki mogut izmeniat' mir (From Knowledge to Creativity: How the Humanities Can Change the World). Moscow–St.Petersburg, izd. Tsentr gumanitarnykh initsiativ (series Humanitas), 2016, 480 pp. ISBN 978-5-98712-601-1
- Poeziia i sverkhpoeziia: O mnogoobrazii tvorcheskikh mirov (Poetry and Superpoetry: On the Variety of Creative Worlds). St. Petersburg: Azbuka (the series Cultural Code), 2016, 478 pp. ISBN 978-5-389-12825-5
- Ironia Ideala. Paradoksy russkoi literatury. (The Irony of the Ideal: Paradoxes of Russian Literature). Moscow: Novoe literaturnoe obozrenie, 2015, 384 pp. ISBN 978-5-4448-0254-0
- Religiia posle ateizma: Novye vozmozhnosti teologii (Religion after Atheism: New Possibilities for Theology). Moscow: AST-Press, 2013, 415 pp. ISBN 978-5-462-01429-1
- Slovo i molchanie. Metafizika russkoi literatury (Word and Silence: The Metaphysics of Russian Literature). Moscow: Vysshaia shkola, 2006, 550 pp. ISBN 5-06-005220-6
- Filosofiia tela (Philosophy of the Body). St. Petersburg: Aleteia, 2006, 194 pp. ISBN 5-89329-908-6
- Znak probela: O budushchem gumanitarnykh nauk (Mapping Blank Spaces: On the Future of the Humanities). Moscow: Novoe literaturnoe obozrenie, 2004, 864 pp. ISBN 5-86793-302-4
- Proektivnyi filosofskii slovar'. Novye terminy i poniatiia (A Projective Philosophical Dictionary. New Terms and Concepts). St. Petersburg: Aleteia, 2003, 512 pp. (coeditor with G. L. Tulchinsky; author of Preface and 90 entries). ISBN 5-89329-634-6
- Filosofiia vozmozhnogo. Modal'nosti v myshlenii i kul'ture (The Philosophy of the Possible: The Modalities in Thought and Culture). St. Petersburg: Aleteia, 2001, 334 pp. ISBN 5-89329-424-6
- Vera i obraz. Religioznoe bessoznatel'noe v russkoi kul'ture XX veka (Faith and Image: The Religious Unconscious in Twentieth Century Russian Culture), Tenafly (New Jersey): Hermitage Publishers, 1994, 270 pp.
- 'Priroda, mir, tainik vselennoi. . .' Sistema peizazhnykh obrazov v russkoi poezii ('Nature, the World, the Mystery of the Universe...': The System of Landscape Images in Russian Poetry). Moscow: Vysshaia Shkola [the central university press of Russia], 1990, 304 pp. ISBN 5-06-001588-2
- Stikhi i Stikhii. Priroda v russkoi poezii 18 – 20 cc.: (Verses and Elements: Nature in Russian Poetry of the 18–20 cc.) (Second revised edition). Samara: Bakhrakh-M, 2007, 352 pp.
- Paradoksy novizny. O literaturnom razvitii XIX-XX vekov (The Paradoxes of Innovation: On the Development of Literature in the 19th and 20th Centuries). Moscow: Sovetskii Pisatel', 1988, 416 pp. ISBN 5-265-00166-2

===== Non-fiction, essays, public scholarship =====
- Ot Biblii do pandemii: Poisk tsennostei v mire katastrof (From the Bible to the Pandemic: The Search for Values in a World of Disasters). Moscow–St. Petersburg: Palmira, 2023, 378 pp. ISBN 978-5-517-08662-4
- Russkii Antimir: Politika na Grani Apokalipsisa (The Russian Anti-world: Politics on the Verge of Apocalypse). New York: FrancTireurUSA, 2023 (January), 250 pp. ISBN 978-1-365-62846-7
- Detskie voprosy: dialogi (Children's Questions: Dialogues). Moscow: ArsisBooks, 2020, 176 pp. ISBN 978-5-904155-94-0
- Ottsovstvo: Opyt, chuvstvo, taina. (Fatherhood: Experience, Feeling, and Mystery). Moscow, Nikea, 2020, 320 pp. (third revised edition). Previous editions: Ottsovstvo (An Essay), Tenafly (New Jersey): Hermitage Publishers, 1992, 160 pp.; Ottsovstvo. Metafizicheskii dnevnik (Fatherhood. A Metaphysical Journal); second revised edition, St. Petersburg: Aletheia, 2003, 248 pp.
- Liubov (Love). Moscow: Ripol Klassik, the series "Philosophy of Life", 2018, 568 pp. ISBN 978-5-386-10735-2
- Solo Amore: Liubov' v piati izmereniiakh (Solo Amore: Love in Five Dimensions), revised and expanded edition. Moscow: Eksmo, 2011, 492 pp; reprinted in two volumes March 2021
  - Vol.1. Eros: Mezhdu liboviu i seksual'nostiu (Eros: Between Love and Sexuality). Ripol Klassik, the series "Philosophy of Life", 272 pp. ISBN 978-5-386-13892-9
  - Vol.2. Prav li Freud? Iazyki liubvi. (Is Freud Right? The Languages of Love) Ripol Klassik, the series "Philosophy of Life", 304 pp. ISBN 978-5-386-13893-6
- Entsiklopedia iunosti (Encyclopedia of Youth), with Sergei Iourienen. Revised and expanded edition. Moscow: Eksmo, 2017, 590 pp. ISBN 978-5-699-99091-7
  - 1st ed. New York: Franc-Tireur USA, 2009, 477 pp.
- Ot sovka k bobku. Politika na grani groteska (From Homo Soveticus to Dostoevsky's Bobok Character. Politics on the Edge of Grotesque). 2nd, revised and expanded edition. Kiev. Dukh i Litera, 2016, 312 pp. ISBN 978-966-378-450-2
  - 1st ed. New York: FrancTireur-USA, 2015, 253 pp.
- Prosto proza (Simply the Prose). New York: FrancTireurUSA, 2016, 194 pp.
- Kleikie listochki: Mysli vrazbros i vopreki. (Sticky Leaves: Scattered Untimely Reflections). Moscow: ArsisBooks, 2014, 266 pp.
- Katalog (Catalog), with Ilya Kabakov. Vologda: Library of Moscow Conceptualism published by German Titov, 2010, 344 pp.
- Vse esse, v 2 tt., t. 1. V Rossii, 1970-e – 1980-e; t. 2. Iz Ameriki, 1990-e-2000-e (All Essays, or All is Essay), in 2 volumes. Ekaterinburg: U-Faktoriia, 2005
  - vol. 1. In Russia, 1970s–1980s, 544 pp. ISBN 5-94799-419-4
  - vol. 2. From America, 1990s–2000s. + 704 pp. ISBN 5-94799-420-8
- Bog detalei. Narodnaia dusha i chastnaia zhizn' v Rossii na iskhode imperii (A Deity of Details: The Public Soul and Private Life at the Twilight of the Russian Empire). New York: Slovo/Word, 1997, 248 pp. 2nd, revised and expanded edition. Moscow: LIA Elinina, 1998, 240 pp.
- Na granitsakh kul'tur. Rossiiskoe – amerikanskoe – sovetskoe (On the Borders of Cultures: Russian – American – Soviet). New York, Slovo/Word, 1995, 343 pp.
- Novoe sektantstvo: tipy religiozno-filosofskikh umonastroenii v Rossii, 1970-80-e gody (New Sectarianism: The Varieties of Religious-Philosophical Consciousness in Russia, the 1970s–1980s). Holyoke (Massachusetts): New England Publishing Co., 1993, 179 pp.
  - 2nd edition, reprint, Moscow: Labirint, 1994, 181 pp.
  - 3rd revised and expanded edition. Samara: Bakhrakh-M, 2005, 255 pp. ISBN 5-94648-039-1
- Velikaia Sov'. Filosofsko-mifologicheskii ocherk (Great Sov'. A Philosophical-Mythological Essay). New York: Word/Slovo, 1994, 175 pp.
  - 2nd revised and expanded edition: Velikaia Sov'. Sovetskaia mifologiia (Great Owland. Soviet Mythology). Samara: Bakhrakh-M, 2006, 272 pp. ISBN 5-94648-049-9
- Novoe v klassike. Derzhavin, Pushkin, Blok v sovremennom vospriiatii (The Classics Renovated: Derzhavin, Pushkin, and Blok in Contemporary Perception). Moscow: Znanie, 1982, 40 pp.

==== Selected translations ====
===== German =====
- Tagebuch für Olga. Chronik einer Vaterschaft. Aus dem Russischen von Otto Markus. Munich: Roitman Verlag, 1990, 256 pp.

===== Korean =====
- 미래 이후의 미래 – 러시아 포스트모더니즘 문학의 기원과 향방 (After the Future: The Paradoxes of Postmodernism and Contemporary Russian Culture). Trans. from Russian and English by Cho Jun-Rae (조준래). Seoul, Hanul Publishing Group, 2009, 878 pp.

===== Greek =====
- Ανθρωπιστικές εφευρέσεις και ηθική της μοναδικότητας (Humanistic Inventions and the Ethics of Uniqueness), translated by Γιώργος Πινακούλας (George Pinakoulas). Athens (Greece): Print Roes, 2017, 232 pp.
