= Smelov =

Smelov (masculine, Russian: Смелов) or Smelova (feminine, Russian: Смелова) is a Russian surname. Notable people with the surname include:

- Boris Smelov (1951 - 1998), Russian photographer
- Sergei Smelov (born 1969), Russian football coach and player
- Yegor Smelov (born 2005), Russian football player
