= Vera Sell-Ryazanoff =

Russian-German painter and philosopher (born 1951)

Vera Sell-Ryazanoff (born 1951) is a Russian-German painter and philosopher. She lives and works in Berlin. Her artwork has exhibited in the Vatican Museum and can be found in numerous private collections.

The focus of her work revolves around the human being beyond the physical dimension. Although her work often deals with the human figure, the figure itself is no longer a purely physical body, but rather a metaphysical entity transcending space and time. The titles of all her works are musical, reflecting the vibration that she believes is at the source of all life. Harvard scholar and Professor of Art History at the Australian National University in Canberra, Sasha Grishin, has said of her work, "Light, which permeates all matter, is allowed to irradiate her forms, sometimes dissolving the flesh to leave only patterns and contours. Although the figure retains the centrality in her work, it is no longer a purely physical entity, but increasingly a metaphysical creation."

== Early life ==
Vera Sell-Ryazanoff was born July 1, 1951, in Moscow. She received her art education at the Surikov Moscow Art Institute where, as a gifted student, she made little attempt to fit in with the prevailing philosophy of Socialist Realism. She made illustrations for the popular science magazine Znanie-Sila, for (in Italian) Jurij Nolev-Sobolev and poets Viktor Bokov and Yevgeny Yevtushenko. She worked on designs for the opera and theatre and also performed professionally in pantomime at the Pantomime-Theatre Gedrias Gitis. As a child she developed a passion for sculpture, particularly carving in wood, and, at 14 years of age, was taught by the sculptor Sergei Konenkov. At the age of 16 she won a national contest for small wooden sculptures which exhibited in Moscow and subsequently in Paris. She was allotted a basement studio in which she could work on her sculptures in exchange for tutoring children with behavioral problems, but three years later both the studio and her work were confiscated and, as a result, Vera Sell-Ryazanoff never returned fully to sculpture.

== Art career ==
In 1974 her school teacher and friend, Vitaly Komar, invited her to participate in what was to become the notorious Bulldozer Exhibition, held on September 15 of that year at the Belyayevo urban forest in Moscow. The non-conformist art exhibition was crushed by police and plainclothes security officials, using bulldozers, water canons and dump trucks. Vera was arrested together with Oscar Rabin. Subsequently, her continuing art studies in the Soviet Union became problematic. In 1975 she married German diplomat Helmut Christian Sell and left Russia permanently on May 29 of that year.

She has lived and exhibited in Germany, Canada, Portugal, Australia, France, Italy, Morocco, South Korea, and Switzerland. While in Australia, she designed the stage set and choreographed four operas. Her career has spanned over forty solo exhibitions across ten countries. She has exhibited at the Vatican in Rome at the Galleria l`Agostiniana (the Gallery for Sacred Art), in Galerie Lise Cormery in Paris where Mstislav Rostropovich opened her exhibition, in Switzerland at the Chateau d`Allaman, and the Art Center Berlin, where she won critical acclaim for her work.
