= Stolyarov =

Stolyarov (feminine: Stolyarova) is a Russian language occupational surname derived from the word stolyar ("carpenter") and literally meaning "descendant of carpenter". The surname may also be transliterated as Stoliarov, Stoljarov, Stoliaroff, etc. The Lithuanianized form is Stoliarovas.

Notable people with this surname include:

- Andrei Stoliarov, Russian tennis player
- Arty (musician), real name: Artyom Stolyarov
- Dmitri Stolyarov
- Ekaterina Stolyarova
- Gennady Stolyarov
- Hélène Stoliaroff, birth name of Hélène Chanel, French actress
- Irina Stolyarova
- Sergei Stolyarov, Soviet Russian film actor
- Valeri Stolyarov
