= Evgeni Dybsky =

Russian and German artist, born in Romania

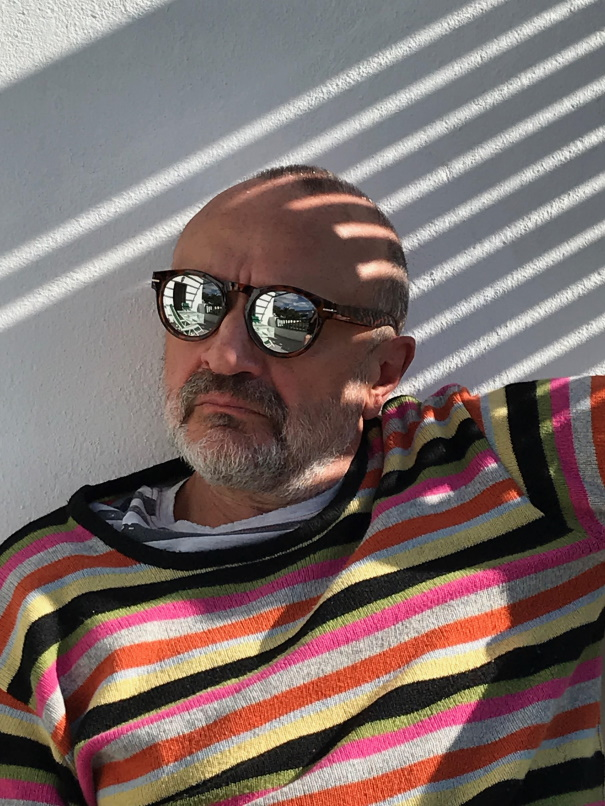
Evgeni Dybsky, 2020

Evgeni Dybsky (Russian: Евгений Дыбский, romanized: Evgenij Dybsky, born 24 January 1955 in Constanța, Romania) is a contemporary artist currently based in Berlin. Dybsky’s painting uses nonlinear visual space as well as juxtapositions of heterogeneous materials. The artist has been working in series since 1985. Since 1992 he has titled all of his series “Translation of Time” and numbered them sequentially from I (1992–1993) to XVII (2013–2022).

== Life and work ==
Dybsky grew up and studied in Russia. In 1978, he graduated from the Moscow State Academic Art Сollege and in 1984 from the State Academic Institute of Fine Arts Surikov. Although this art training enforced the prevailing Soviet dogma of realism, he oriented himself towards non-figurative art early on. Already as a student he gained recognition for his participation in the uncensored, nonconformist Single Day Exhibitions as well as the 1983 XV. Moscow Youth Exhibition. At the one day exhibition at the Moscow House of Artists on Kuznetsky Most, which would emerge as a key event of Moscow’s art scene in the spring of 1984, Dybsky exhibited works next to Maxim Kantor, Zakhar Sherman, Ivan Lubennikov, and Alexander Scherbinin.

In 1985, Dybsky became associated with the Metarealist poets, especially Alexei Parshchikov. Early non-figurative works of Dybsky were similarly referred to as “metarealistic” or “metametaphorical.” Later, Parshchikov would describe Dybsky’s painting in the following way:

“The color surfaces assemble themselves according to the principle of montage – their surfaces form compactions; it seems that color moves through the various depths; it immerses itself, seeps through, meanders, emerges on the surface, slides over it, lingers, and splits into unpredictable shades. The frame has a depth that lends the painting the appearance of a glass vitrine containing an object. This again emphasises the painting’s objectness. Because insofar as the vitrine is grasped as an integral part of the exhibited object, it functions as a transparent veil that directs a gaze not onto an abstraction, but – quite directly – onto the materiality of a captured and preserved impression.”

1987 brought Dybsky international recognition. Exhibitions in the Galerie de France, the Costakis Collection, the Forsblom Gallery at the Imatra Festival – among other places – followed. In 1988, works of Dybsky were sold at the first Sotheby’s auction in the Soviet Union. Accepting the invitation by Milanese gallery owner Giorgio Marconi, Dybsky moved to Italy in 1990 and began working with Marconi’s gallery.

In 1995, the artist moved to Cologne, where he lived and worked until 2008. In this time, his works became even less figurative, tending toward monochromaticity and minimalism.

2006, after encountering restored frescoes of Giotto di Bondone in the Cappella degli Scrovegni in Padua, Dybsky began his “Giotto Project”. The artist commented this series:

“We tend to transfer our fantasies to our love objects; this also pertains to our fantasies about form. I began to sublimate my [unrestored] Paduan Giotto, on my canvases, the size of which corresponded to those of the original frescoes. Certainly it became “my Giotto,” endowed with the particularities of my painting. These particularities result from my longstanding work, which for me denotes an ongoing development of my painting. Nevertheless, over the years, the specific characteristics of Giotto’s painting also flowed into my work.”

In 2013, Dybsky began the project “Translation of Time XVII / Tintoretto Included,” work on which is ongoing as of 2022. The inconsistencies characteristic of Jacopo Tintorettos use of chiaroscuro animated Dybsky to experiment with painting techniques, structures, and materials that liberate light and shadow from the mimetic representational tradition and transform them into autonomous artistic means. This series both presents a dialogue with several paintings of Tintoretto and integrates the chiaroscuro effects that Dybsky found in his everyday life, in diverse landscapes, interiors, and in modelling the human face and figure.
