= Masterkov =

Masterkov (Russian: Мастерков) (feminine: Masterkova) is a Russian-language surname. Notable people with the surname include:

- Aleksandr Masterkov (1921–1945), Soviet WWII pilot, Hero of the Soviet Union
- Svetlana Masterkova (born 1968), Russian middle-distance runner
- Lidiya Masterkova (1927–2008), Soviet-born French painter
