= Bulldozer Exhibition =

1974 unofficial Soviet art exposition

Coordinates: 55°38′03.59″N 37°31′13.52″E

Oscar Rabin, Roses on the Preobrazhensky Val, 1966. A typical painting of the main organizer of the exhibition at the time

Composition by Masterkova

The Bulldozer Exhibition (Russian: Бульдозерная выставка) was an unofficial art exhibition on a vacant lot in the Belyayevo urban forest (Bittsa Park) by Moscow and Leningrad avant-garde artists on 15 September 1974. The exhibition was forcefully broken-up by a large police force that included bulldozers and water cannons, hence the name.

Since the 1930s in the Soviet Union Socialist realism had been the only art style largely supported by the state. All other forms of art were forced underground and sometimes prosecuted. One of the attempts to break out of the underground to more public view was the Belyayevo exhibition.

It was organised by three underground artists, Oscar Rabin, Youri Jarkikh (Jarki) and Alexander Gleser. Among the artists taking part in the exhibition were Evgeny Rukhin, Valentin Vorobyov (b. 1938), Vladimir Nemukhin, Lidiya Masterkova, Borukh Steinberg, Nadegda Elskaja, Alexander Rabin, Vasilij Sitnikov, Vera Sell-Ryazanoff, Vitaly Komar, Alexander Melamid, and Igor Sinyavin. It was held on a vacant lot, officially part of an urban forest in Belyayevo. Attendance consisted of approximately twenty artists and a group of spectators that included relatives, friends of the artists, friends of the friends and some Western journalists. The paintings were installed on makeshift stands made out of dump wood.

The organizer Oscar Rabin told in an interview in London in 2010: "The exhibition was prepared as a political act against the oppressive regime, rather than an artistic event. I knew that we'd be in trouble, that we could be arrested, beaten. There could be public trials. The last two days before the event were very scary, we were anxious about our fate. Knowing that virtually anything can happen to you is frightening." Rabin was arrested and punished with expulsion from Russia, but was allowed to leave with his family to Paris.

Despite the minor size of the event, it was considered by the authorities as very serious. They marshalled a large group of attackers that included three bulldozers, water cannons, dump trucks and hundreds of off-duty policemen. Officially, the group was supposed to be "gardeners" expanding the urban forest, who reacted in spontaneous outrage to the offense against their proletarian sensibilities. It was never denied, though, that they got their orders from the KGB.

The attackers destroyed the paintings, and beat and arrested the artists, spectators and journalists. Oscar Rabin went through the exhibition hanging onto the blade of the bulldozer. One of the attackers, militia lieutenant Avdeenko, shouted at the artists: "You should be shot! Only you are not worth the ammunition ..." ("Стрелять вас надо! Только патронов жалко...").

Rabin later recounted the event: "It was very frightening … The bulldozer was a symbol of an authoritarian regime just like the Soviet tanks in Prague." Two of his own paintings – a landscape and a still life – were among those flattened by bulldozers or burned by the invading KGB.

After the event was widely publicized in the Western media, embarrassed authorities were forced to allow a similar open air exhibition in the Izmailovo urban forest two weeks later on 29 September 1974. The new exhibition of works of 40 artists was held for four hours and was visited by thousands of people (the numbers cited differ from one and a half thousand to twenty-five thousand). A participant in the exhibitions, Boris Zhutkov, has said that the quality of the Izmaylovo paintings was much lower than the paintings in Belyayevo, since in the original exhibition the artists showed the best paintings they had only to have most of them destroyed. The four hours in the forest of the Izmailovo exhibition has often been remembered as "The Half-day of Freedom." The Izmailovo exhibition in turn gave way to other exhibitions of nonconformist art which were very important in the history of modern Russian art.

== See also ==
- Manege Affair
