= Lipovetsky (disambiguation) =

Gilles Lipovetsky (born 1944) is a French philosopher, writer, and sociologist.

Lipovetsky may also refer to:

- Mark Lipovetsky (born 1964), Russian literary, film, and cultural critic
- 16861 Lipovetsky, an asteroid
