= Treblinka (disambiguation) =

Treblinka, or Treblinka II, was a German Nazi extermination camp in Poland during World War II, where at least 700,000 Jews were murdered

Treblinka may also refer to:

- Treblinka labor camp, or Treblinka I, a German Nazi camp near Treblinka extermination camp, where about 20,000 were enslaved
- Treblinka, Masovian Voivodeship, a village in Poland east of Warsaw, near which the Treblinka I and II camps were built
- Treblinka (sculpture), a memorial in Berlin by Vadim Sidur to the Jews murdered in Treblinka
- Tiamat (band), a Swedish black metal band known as Treblinka from 1987 to 1989
- Treblinka (Finnish band), a Finnish hardcore punk band, active from 1985–88; later some members formed Klamydia

== See also ==
- Operation Treblinka, an unsubstantiated putative Polish Home Army involvement in the Treblinka uprising of August 1943
