= Irina Stolyarova =

Russian art collector

- Ирина Столярова
- Born: 14 February 1966 (age 59); Moscow
- Occupation: Art collector

Irina Stolyarova (Russian: Ирина Столярова; born 14 February 1966 in Moscow) is an art collector, nonconformist movement expert, and the art director of the Flying in the Wake of Light collection.

== Biography ==
During her early career, Stolyarova worked for the journal Sovetsky Sport. She then moved to London during the mid-1990s. She started her art collection in 2010.

The first exhibition of the collection was organized in 2015 at the Modern art museum of Moscow.

== Collection ==
Stolyarova's collection, Flying in the Wake of Light, was gathered during the last decade and not all the Russian artists included are products of Soviet soil. Her collection is focused on the work of Russian artists of several generations, including those living in Russia, in the West, and the first émigrés generation associated with the School of Paris. Many are émigrés or children of émigrés, such as Pierre Dmitrienko (1925–1974), with a biographical background that is more Montparnasse than Arbat.

Russian art critic Alexander Rappaport, who has contributed one of the essays to Flying in the Wake of Light, qualified the Stolyarova collection as a gathering of individual and convivial voices that create an artistic movement of its own. For J.E. Bowlt, the artists represented in Stolyarova's collection compose an aesthetic and polyphonic whole cemented around a counter-movement of Russian art. A. Borovsky acknowledged that her collection is a "free-spirited expressions of various forms of abstraction".

Artists from the Stolyarova's collection :

- Pierre Dmitrienko
- Serge Charchoune
- Leone Zak
- Andre Lanskoy
- Isaac Pailes
- Oscar Rabin
- Vladimir Nemukhin
- Lydia Masterkova
- Boris Sveshnikov
- Edward Steinberg
- Francisco Infante-Arana
- Evgeny Rukhin
- Jules Pascin
- Vladimir Yankilevsky
- Lev Kropivnitsky
- Yury Zlotnikov
- Dmitri Plavinsky
- Victor Pivovarov
- Andrei Grosizky
- Nikolay Vechtomov
- Oleg Tselkov
- William Brui
- Semyon Faibisovich
- Natasha Arendt
- Yury Kuper
- Maxim Kantor
