= Stalin Monument (The Hague) =

Art installation in The Hague, Netherlands

Stalin Monument in The Hague
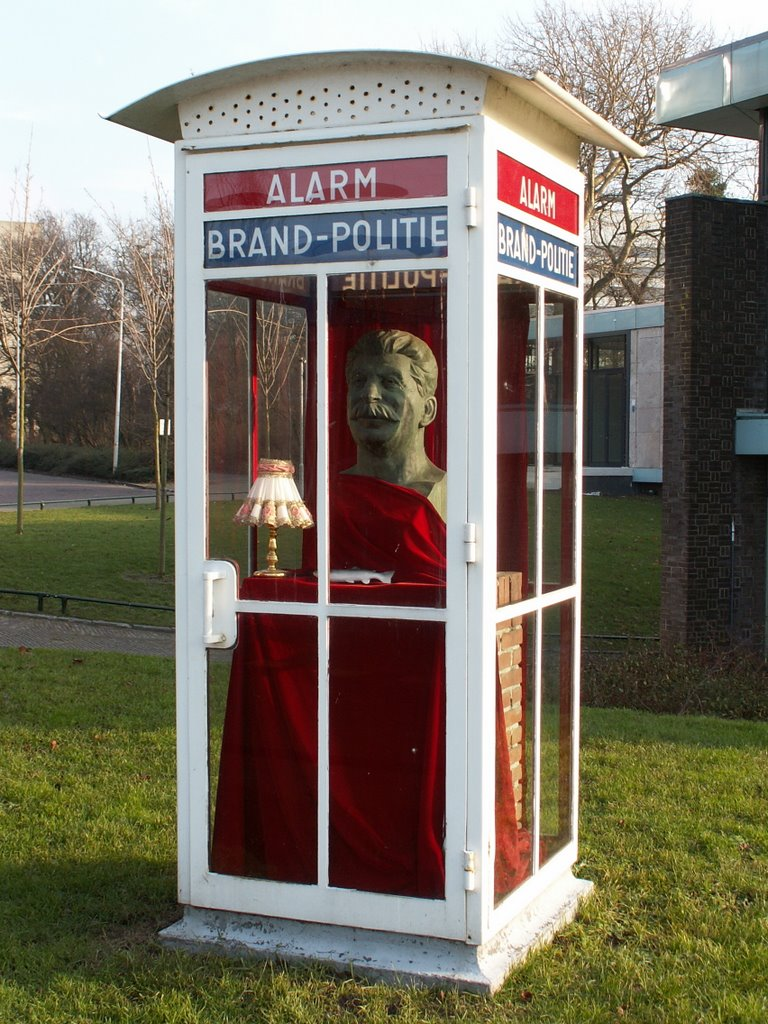
- Interactive map of Stalin Monument in The Hague
- Location: The Netherlands, The Hague, 2517 KK, Eisenhowerlaan 29
- Coordinates: 52.0907°N 4.2792°E

The Stalin Monument (also called: Stalin Bust and Herring) is an artwork in The Hague, Netherlands, created by Vitaly Komar and Alexander Melamid (the so called Komar and Melamid duo). It shows a bust of Joseph Stalin, placed in a phone booth. In front of him is a herring - Stalin was fond of eating herring - and lamp on a table covered by red felt.

The sculpture was originally placed in the red light district of The Hague in 1986. After renovation it was moved to its current location just next to the KM21 museum for modern art.

It is part of the collection of the Kunstmuseum, that oversees KM21.
