= Tatiana Goricheva =

Russian philosopher, theologian and dissident (1947–2025)

- Татьяна Горичева
- Portrait of Goricheva
- Born: Tatiana Mikhailovna Goricheva; 12 August 1947; Leningrad, Russian SFSR, Soviet Union
- Died: 23 September 2025 (aged 78)
- Education: Leningrad State University
- Occupations: Philosopher; theologian

Tatiana Mikhailovna Goricheva (Russian: Татья́на Миха́йловна Го́ричева; 12 August 1947 – 23 September 2025) was a Russian philosopher, theologian, dissident and feminist. She was a contributing author of Woman and Russia: An Almanac for Women about Women, the feminist journal founded and edited by Tatyana Mamonova samizdat, as well as a founder of the Mariia club.

== Life and career ==
Tatiana Mikhailovna Goricheva was born on 12 August 1947 in Leningrad, Russian SFSR. Goricheva studied at Leningrad State University, where she was taught by Boris Paramonov. Her initial specialism was French and German existentialism, and she corresponded with Martin Heidegger. In 1973 she started a religious-philosophical seminar with her then husband, Viktor Krivulin, which became a dissident religious group "37", publishing a samizdat journal under the same title.

In 1974 she converted to the Russian Orthodox Church.

She collaborated with Tatiana Mamonova on the feminist samizdat journal Woman and Russia, which appeared in 1979. After Mamonova's expulsion from the Soviet Union, she and Leningrad colleagues formed a women's group known as the Mariia club. After Goricheva was forced to emigrate from the Soviet Union in 1980, she settled in Paris. There she founded the philosophical and religious journal Conversations, which was published from 1983 to 1991.

Goricheva characterizes modern Western culture as 'post-nihilistic', in its indifference to religion. However, she sees this disinterest in the sacred as potentially itself akin to Christ's kenosis, allowing mundane things to be newly invested with spiritual meaning. Following Peter Sloterdijk's Critique of Cynical Reason, she diagnoses contemporary culture as displaying a conventional cynicism. She contrasts this to the individual freedom and unconventionality of the ancient cynics, which points the way to the uncompromising radicalism of the 'holy fool':

Holy fools, like cynics, are completely liberated from common sense and all of life's conventions [...] They are indecent to such a degree that they may be enlisted as Rabelaisian characters. They are grotesque and sometime seem, as did the cynics, like animals.

Goricheva died in September 2025, at the age of 78.

== Works ==
- Talking about God is dangerous: My experiences in the East and in the West. 1986.
- Cry of the spirit: witnesses to faith in the Soviet Union. 1989.
