= Viktor Krivulin =

Russian poet, novelist and essayist (1944–2001)

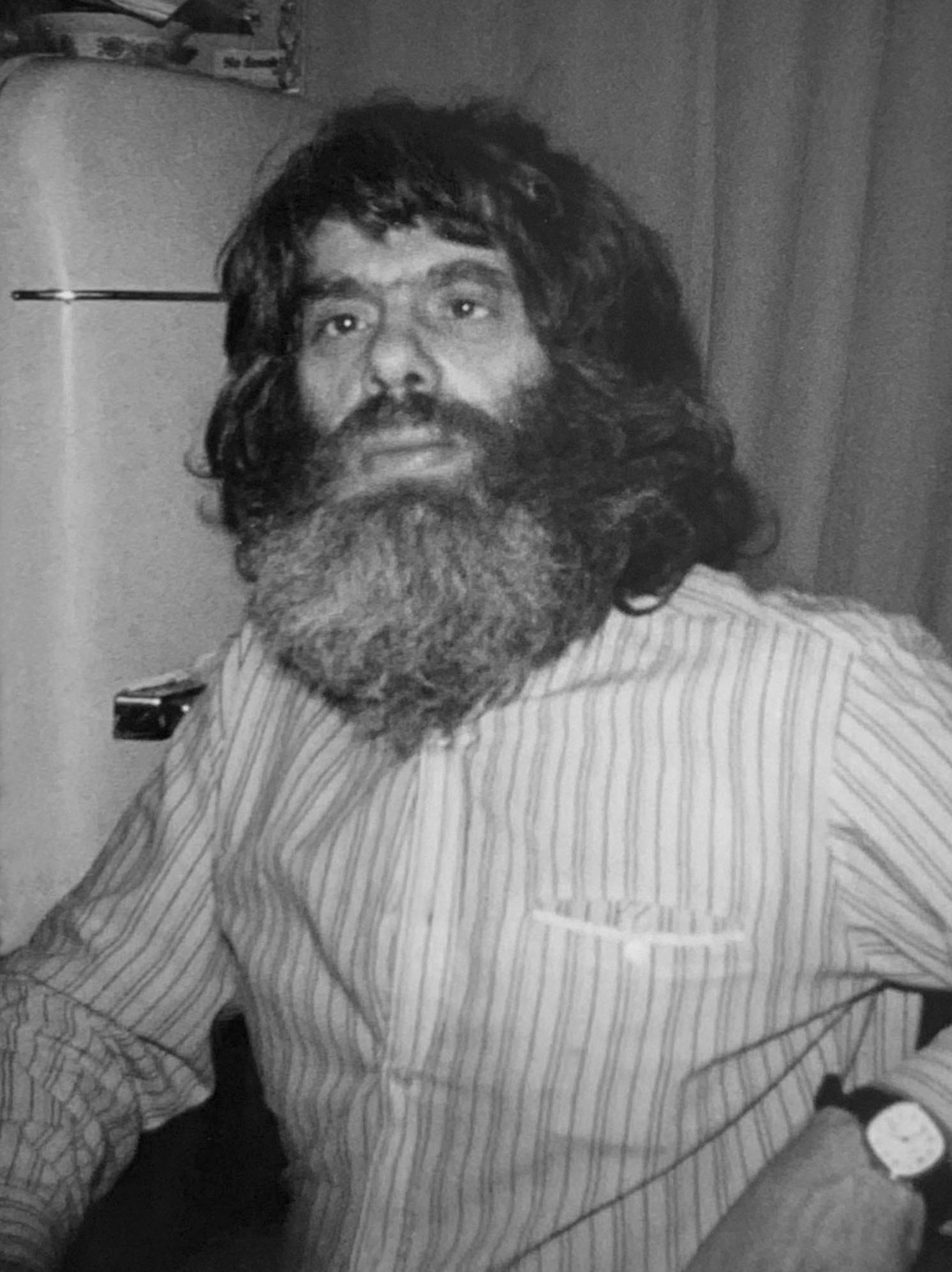
- Born: Viktor Borisovich Krivulin; 9 July 1944; Kadiivka, Ukrainian SSR, Soviet Union
- Died: 17 March 2001 (aged 56); Saint Petersburg, Russia
- Occupations: Poet; essayist
- Writing career
- Language: Russian

Viktor Borisovich Krivulin (Russian: Виктор Борисович Кривулин; 9 July 1944 – 17 March 2001) was a Russian poet, novelist and essayist.

== Biography ==
Krivulin graduated from the faculty of philology from Leningrad State University. He opted for independent cultural activity and worked mostly as a watchman, editor of short living leaflets of sanitary education while heading some important institutions of Russian uncensored literature of 1970s, such as 37 and Severnaya Pochta samizdat magazines among others. Later, Krivulin was involved with other samizdat journals Obvodnyi Kanal and Chasy, the journal of the Leningrad alternative culture club called Klub-81.

In 1978 Krivulin became the first winner of Andrei Bely independent literary prize and then for more than ten years he participated in running this award.

After the collapse of the Soviet Union Krivulin served as co-chairman of the St Petersburg branch of the Democratic Russia party, where he worked with the reformer Galina Starovoytova murdered in November 1998.

== Work ==
let it be someone good
who would come to us and say:
it is not scary to live... life — in short —
is not a road but a station
the place where we bummed
between women between columns
half dead music
in loudspeaker
stuck

— Trans. Tatiana Bonch-Osmolovskaya

Krivulin's poetic output reflects some features of the postmodern current that has been variously labelled as neomodernism and metarealism. For many years, his poetry circulated exclusively in samizdat (Leningrad journals such as Chasy, 37 and Obvodnyi kanal), as well as the émigré journals Grani ("Facets"), Tret’ia volna ("The Third Wave"), Vestnik RKhD ("Herald of the Russian Christian Movement") and Kontinent.

Krivulin's first poetry collection was published in 1981 in Paris and was followed with the two volumes of selected poems released in 1988. His first official Soviet publication appeared only in 1985 in the pages of the club's anthology, Krug. Krivulin's first book in the Soviet Union was published in 1990.

== Personal life ==
Krivulin was married several times. His first wife was the philosopher Tatyana Goricheva, with whom they organized unofficial seminars and edited the journal 37, named after the number of their communal apartment. In the 1960s before getting married with Goricheva, Krivulin started a relationship with Masha Ivashintsova, clandestine street photographer whose works were discovered by her relatives in the family attic and made public. They were breaking up and getting back together several times until Masha's death in 2000.

== Collections in Russian ==
- 1981: Stikhi (Poems), Paris: Rhythm.
- 1988: Stikhi (Poems), Paris, Leningrad: Beseda
- 1990: Obraschenie (Appeal), Leningrad: Sovetsky Pisatel
- 1993: Konzert po Zayavkam (Concert on request), Saint-Petersburg: Publishing house of the Fund of Russian Poetry
- 1994: Predgranichie: Teksty 1993-94 (Frontier: Texts of 1993–94), Saint-Petersburg: Borey Art
- 1998: Requiem, Moscow: ARGO-RISK.
- 1998: Kupanie v iordani (Bathing in the Jordan River), Saint-Petersburg, Pushkin Fund
- 2001: Stikhi yubileinogo goda (Poems of the jubilee year), Moscow: OGI
- 2001: Stikhi posle stikhov (Poems after poems), Saint-Petersburg: Peterburgsky pisatel

== Sources ==
- Johnson, Kent (1992). Third Wave: The New Russian Poetry, The University of Michigan Press
