= In Search of a Lost Paradise =

2015 film directed by Evgeniy Tsymbal

- Directed by: Evgeniy Tsymbal
- Written by: Alexander Smoljanski; Evgeniy Tsymbal
- Produced by: Alexander Smoljanski
- Cinematography: Victor Dobronitsky; Alexander Smoljanski
- Edited by: Alexander Gurin; Evgeniy Tsymbal
- Production company: Soms Films
- Release date: September 25, 2015 (United Kingdom)
- Running time: 52 minutes
- Countries: Germany; France; Russia
- Languages: Russian; (with English subtitles)

In Search of a Lost Paradise is a 2015 German-Russian documentary by Evgeniy Tsymbal and Alexander Smoljanski which tells the story of Russian artist Valentina Kropivnitskaya and her husband, the artist Oscar Rabin.

Aside from the biography of the artists, the film also addresses their thoughts about twentieth-century art. The documentary was directed by Evgeny Tsymbal.

In Search of a Lost Paradise is the recipient of a Nika Award 2016 for Best Documentary Feature.

== Background ==
In 1974, Rabin and Kropivnitskaya organized a prohibited open-air art exhibition, which was smashed by the KGB using bulldozers. The following day the event was publicized worldwide. In 1977, Oscar Rabin was placed under house arrest and shortly thereafter, the family was exiled from the USSR and stripped off their citizenship. However, this historical event forced the Soviets to change their stance regarding art.

They came to France without any money and not knowing a single word of French - they continued pursuing their artistic passion, and gradually became famous painters.

== Production ==
The pre-production started in 2008 when producer Alexander Smoljanski, who was then living in Paris, discovered that Russian painter Oscar Rabin lived next-door. After gathering more than 30 hours of interview footage, he invited Evegeniy Tsymbal to join the project which eventually was completed in summer 2015. It has since received positive reviews from critics and was awarded Best Documentary at various international film festivals.

== Awards and nominations ==
Year	Award	Location	Category	Result
2015	3rd Indian Cine Film Festival-15	Mumbai, India	Best Documentary	Nominated
2015	Portsmouth International Film Festival	Portsmouth, UK	Best Documentary	Won
2015	Southampton International Film Festival	Southampton, UK	Best Editing	Won
2015	Russia Abroad International Film Festival	Moscow, Russia	Cinema Academy Award	Won
2015	The International Human Rights Film Festival “STALKER”	Moscow, Russia	Best Documentary	Won
2016	Berlin Independent Film Festival	Berlin, Germany	Best Documentary	Won
2016	«Nika» Award	Moscow, Russia	Best Documentary	Won
2016	Paris Independent Film Festival	Paris, France	Best Documentary	Won
