= Masha Ivashintsova =

Russian photographer

- Born: March 23, 1942; Sverdlovsk, USSR
- Died: July 13, 2000 (aged 58); Saint-Petersburg, Russia
- Known for: Photographer and painter
- Website: mashaivashintsova.com

Masha Ivashintsova (March 23, 1942 − July 13, 2000) was a Russian photographer from Saint-Petersburg (then Leningrad, USSR) who was heavily engaged in the Leningrad poetic and photography underground movement of the 1960−80s. Masha photographed prolifically throughout most of her life, but she hoarded her photo-films in the attic and rarely developed them. Only when her daughter Asya found some 30,000 negatives in their attic in 2017 did Masha's works become public. In this regard, Masha Ivashintsova's work and story have been compared to those of Vivian Maier.

Ivashintsova died in 2000 at the age of 58.

== Personal life ==
Masha was born into an aristocratic family whose assets were seized following the Bolshevik Revolution. In Leningrad, Ivashintsova joined the city's literary and artistic underground. She worked odd jobs as a theater critic, a librarian, a cloakroom attendant, an elevator mechanic, and a security guard, amongst others. Occasionally, she would visit Asya in Moscow.

Masha was heavily engaged in the Leningrad poetic and photography of the 1960−80s. She was in relationships with photographer Boris Smelov, poet Viktor Krivulin and linguist Melvar Melkumyan, the latter whom she married and had a daughter, Asya Melkumyan.

== Exhibitions ==
- Masha Ivashintsova, Street Photographer (2018), International Center of Photography, New York City, USA
- Brought to Light (2019), Vintage Photo Festival, Bydgoszcz, Poland, curated by Katarzyna Gębarowska and Masha Galleries.
- Chiaroscuro (2019-2020), Juhan Kuus Documentary Photo Centre, Tallinn, Estonia

== See also ==
- Vivian Maier

== Links and sources ==
- Masha Ivashintsova official web site
- Interview: Woman Discovers Over 30,000 Secret Photos Left Behind by Her Mother // My Modern Met
