= Treblinka (sculpture) =

Sculpture in Berlin, Germany

- Треблинка (Russian)
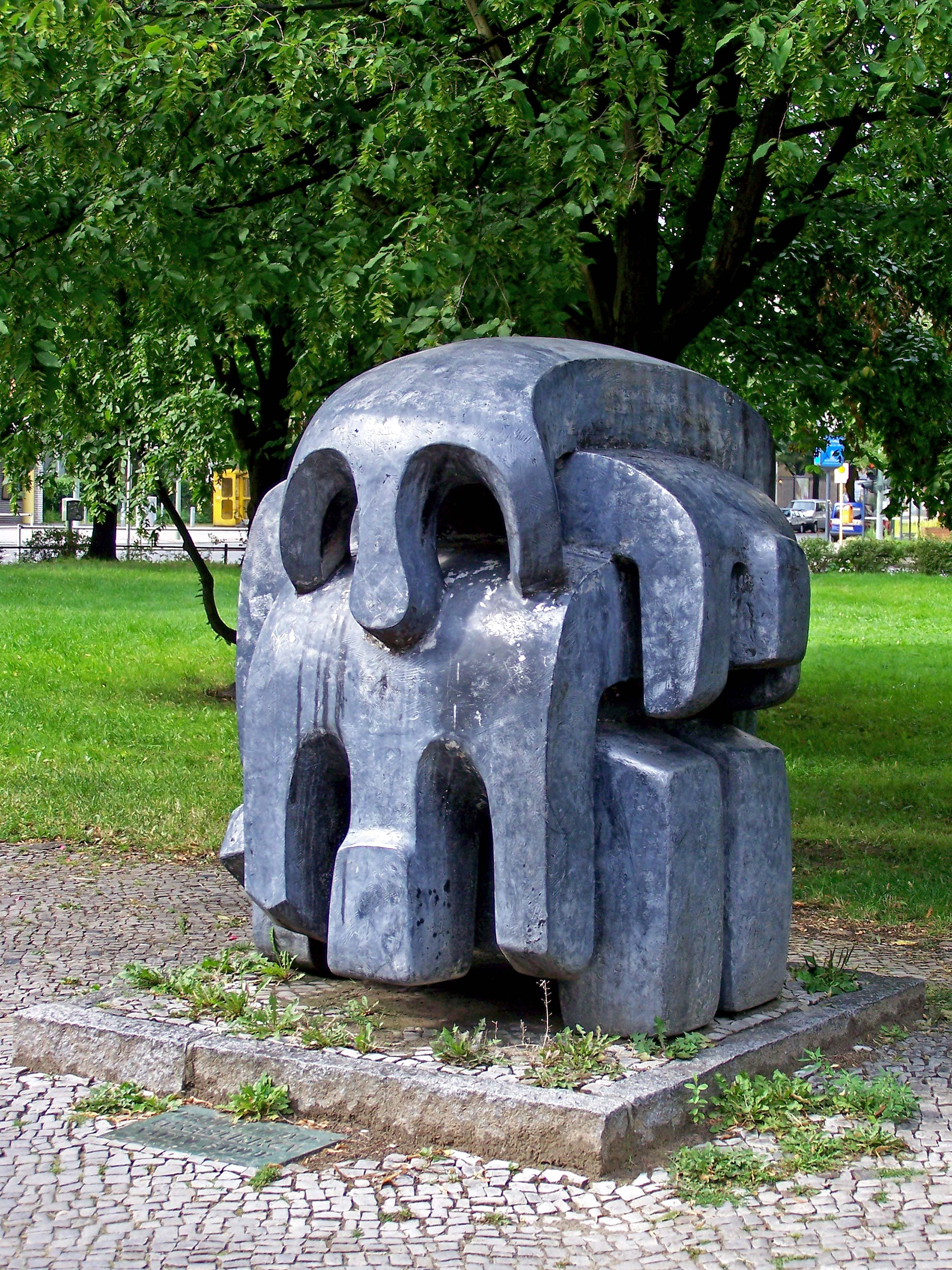
- Artist: Vadim Sidur
- Completion date: October 13, 1991
- Medium: Bronze, granite
- Movement: Underground, abstract art, avant-garde
- Dimensions: 180 cm (71 in)
- Location: Berlin

Sculpture Treblinka is a memorial to the Jews murdered by the Nazi Germany at the Treblinka extermination camp in occupied Poland during the Holocaust during World War II. It was erected in 1979 in the Charlottenburg district of West Berlin, opposite the district court building where the files of the repressed Jews were kept. The author of the sculpture was the Soviet underground artist Vadim Sidur. The memorial was one of the first representations of the memory of the Holocaust in Germany.

== Links ==
- Treblinka Gedenken in Berlin. Vadim Sidurs Skulptur am Amtsgerichtsplatz. Museum Charlottenburg-Wilmersdorf in der Villa Oppenheim
