= Vladimir Nemukhin =

Russian artist (1925–2016)

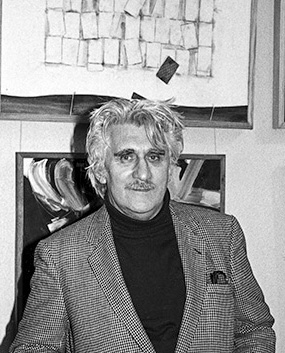
Vladimir Nemukhin, 1987

Vladimir Nikolaevich Nemukhin (Russian: Владимир Николаевич Немухин; February 12, 1925 in village Priluki, Kaluga Oblast, RSFSR, USSR – April 18, 2016 Moscow, Russia) was a Russian artist. Nemukhin was associated with the 'Lianozovo Group' along with Oscar Rabin, Valentina Kropivnitskaya (1924-2008) and Lidiya Masterkova.

== Early life ==
Born and raised in village, Nemukhin began his career working at a plant that produced technical instruments during World War II. In 1943, he met Petr Yefimovich Sokolov, assistant to Kazimir Malevich and later Pavel Kuznetsov. Sokolov introduced Nemukhin to the avant-garde movements of the time, launching him on a more experimental artistic path. Nemukhin joined the Studio School of the House of Unions (VTsSPS), from which he graduated in 1946.

From 1952 to 1956 Nemukhin worked as an interior designer. In 1956 he met Oskar Rabin, with whom he met with a group of like-minded artists and poets whose primary meeting place was Rabin’s apartment. Since Rabin lived in the barracks in a small village, Lianozovo, the group is commonly known as the 'Lianozovo Group'. They also met at the village of Priluki on the banks of the Oka River, where Nemukhin’s father was born and where Nemukhin still owns a summer house.

In 1958, Nemukhin attended the 1958 exhibit of American art in Moscow, which featured the Abstract Expressionism of Jackson Pollock and Willem de Kooning. This was followed by his first real abstract work in 1959.

== Role in Russian Art World ==
In the 1950s when Russia, under Nikita Khrushchev, enjoyed a slightly more permissive cultural climate, Nemukhin was one of the artists who searched for new ways of expression. Rejecting the Socialist Realism that was the only approved artistic form allowed in the Soviet Union at the time, 'unofficial' artists like Nemukhin formed their own ways of portraying the world around them. Their art tended to be concerned with universal values and was highly individual in nature, leading to a constant battles with censorship authorities. Nemukhin played an important role in these confrontations as, being a significant personality in the Moscow art world of the 1960s and 1970s, he served as a negotiator between the artists and the state.

Nemukhin's work is predominantly abstract and very personal. According to Julia Tulovsky, Assistant Curator at the Zimmerli Art Museum, “Nemukhin is best known for his abstract still lifes with playing cards, fragments of card tables, and fighting cocks ... In a majority of cases, these symbolize accident, intrigue, and indeterminacy, contrasting with the doctrine of predetermination demanded by the Soviet establishment. Nemukhin intends his structures, surfaces and symbols to reveal the spiritual, the unreal, the emotionally obscure, and the existential.”

Since 1959, Nemukhin participated in over a hundred group exhibitions in museums and galleries around the world, including the first show of nonconformist art, the first autumnal review "In the Open Air" ("Bulldozer Exhibition") in Belyaeva in 1974. His works are in major public collections in Russia, Europe, and the United States.

In addition to creating art, Nemukhin also collected works by artists of his generation. Refusing to sell the collection, which he claimed began when artist Anatoly Zverev painted a still life during a visit to his apartment, he instead donated it to the Tretyakov Gallery on its 150th anniversary in recognition of his friends.

Works by Nemukhin can be found in the collections of major museums: the State Tretyakov Gallery (Moscow), the Moscow Museum of Modern Art, the Stedelijk Museum (Amsterdam), and the Museum of Modern Art (MoMA) in New York, the Ludwig Museum (Cologne), amidst others. About 100 pieces are included in the Norton and Nancy Dodge Collection of Soviet Nonconformist Art (Jane Voorhees Zimmerli Art Museum, New Brunswick, New Jersey).

== Life ==
In the late 1990s, Nemukhin moved to Düsseldorf, Germany, but he recently has returned to Moscow. His latest work has taken the form of sculptural homages to artists like Cézanne, Vladimir Veisberg, and Dmitry Krasnopevtsev, with reference to geometric abstraction and Constructivism.

In 2008, Nemukhin became an honorary member of the Russian Academy of Arts.

In 2016, Nemukhin died.

== Personal life ==
Nemukhin was closely associated with Lidiya Masterkova, who is often referred to as his wife in numerous citations although the two were in fact never married.

== Bibliography ==
- Wladimir Nemuchin. Galerie BarGera. (in German, English, Russian).
- Kolodzei, Natalia. 4+4: Two Generations of Russian Avant-Garde. Mimi Ferzt Gallery, New York, 2001. Exhibition catalogue.
- Hurricane of Time: 1960-2000, Selection from the Kolodzei Collection of Russian and Eastern European Art. SanRemo, Italy. Exhibition catalogue.
- Baigell, Renee and Matthew Baigell. Soviet Dissident Artists: Interviews After Perestroika. New Brunswick: Rutgers University Press, 1995.
- Rosenfeld, Alla (editor); Dodge, Norton T. (editor). From Gulag to Glasnost : Nonconformist Art from the Soviet Union. Thames and Hudson/The Jane Voorhees Zimmerli Art Museum, Rutgers, 1995.
