= Alexei Parshchikov =

Russian poet, critic, and translator (1954–2009)

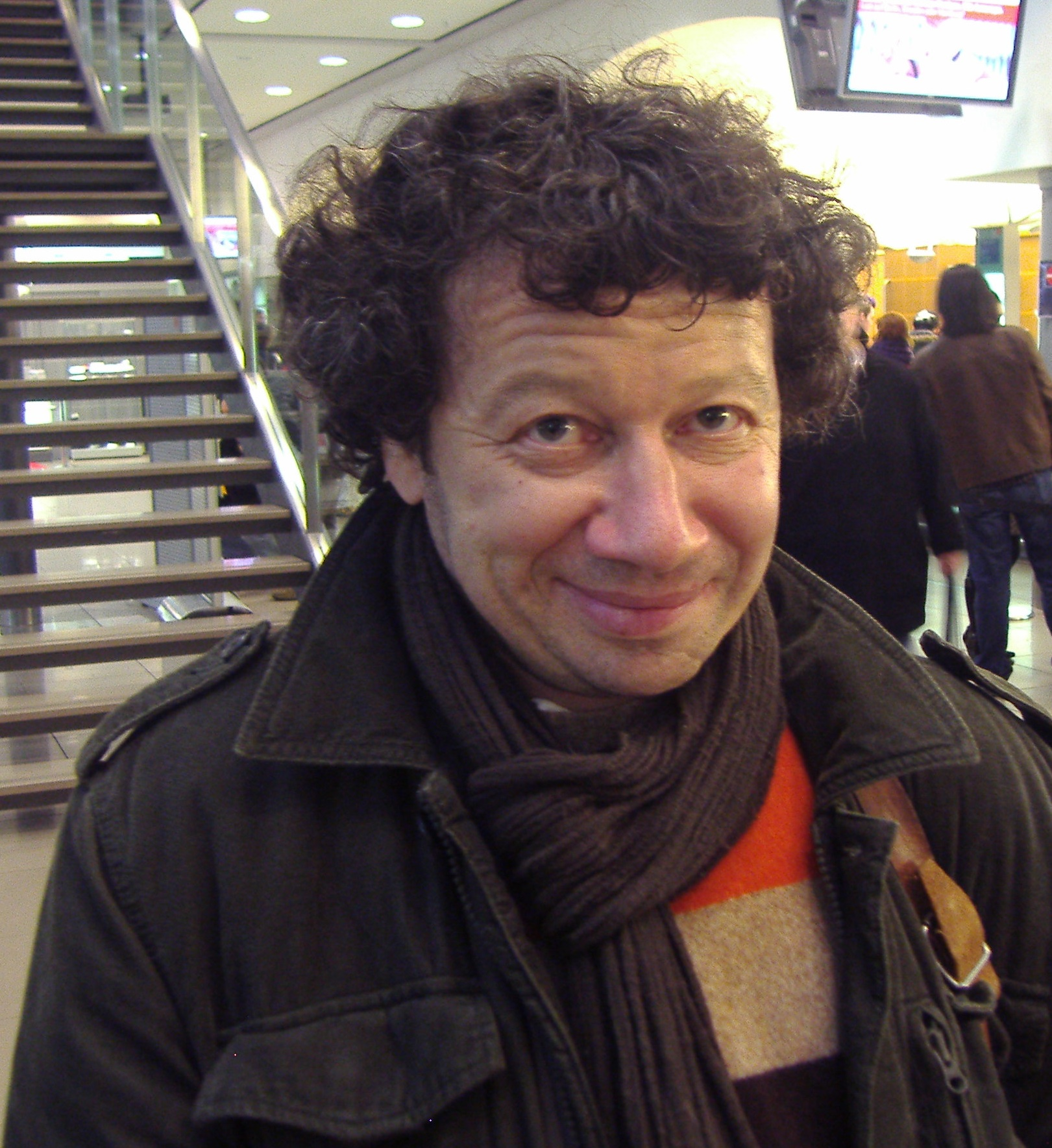
Image of Alexei Parshchikov in 2008

Alexei Maximovich Parshchikov (Russian: Алексе́й Макси́мович Па́рщиков) (25 May 1954 – 3 April 2009) was a Russian poet, critic, and translator.

Born in Olga, Primorsky Krai, Russian SFSR to the family of a famous physician, Maxim Reiderman (ru:Рейдерман, Максим Исаакович), and a surgeon, L.S. Parschikova, Parshchikov was raised in the Ukrainian SSR and attended the Kyiv Academy of Agriculture. He spent two years as an agricultural scientist before entering Maxim Gorky Literature Institute (graduated in 1981).

In 1993, he received an MA from Stanford University. His dissertation was devoted to the works of Dmitri Prigov.

Parshchikov was regarded as the major figure of the Meta-metaphorist movement (a Russian poetic movement called by some critics "Meta-realism"), which Parshchikov founded along with Aleksandr Eremenko, Ivan Zhdanov and Ilya Kutik. In the last two decades, his works have been translated into fifteen languages. His publications in English include Blue Vitriol, translated by Michael Palmer, Michael Molnar, and John High and with an Introduction by Marjorie Perloff (Avec Books, 1994).

He resided in Cologne, Germany and died there.
