= Evgeny Rukhin =

Russian painter (1943–1976)

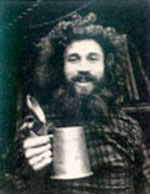
Evgeny Rukhin

Evgeny Rukhin (Russian: Евгений Рухин; July 2, 1943 - May 24, 1976) was a Russian Non-Conformist painter and one of the organizers of the Bulldozer Exhibition in 1974. He died in 1976 after his studio in Leningrad caught fire.

== Life ==
Evgeny Rukhin (ru) (1943–1976) was born in Saratov, Russia into a family of scientists. He began painting at the age of twenty, during his geology studies. He was a Russian non-conformist artist working in Leningrad in the 1960s and 1970s. He was married to Galina Popova, an official Soviet artist who studied stained glass during her art school days.

In 1976, Rukhin along with three others were in Rukhin's Leningrad art studio when it caught fire. Two of Rukhin's guest managed to escape but Rukhin and Ludmila Boblyak were later found dead in the studio. In John McPhee's book, the Ransom of Russian Art, McPhee recounted five interviews he had with Rukhin's associates (who had not been at the scene of the fire) about Rukhin's death. Each of the accounts blamed the KGB. Rukhin's wife, Galina, stated that a doctor and a medical student had told her Rukhin had been "murdered by a drug injection before the fire." None of the accounts of Rukhin's death were dispositive and McPhee was sued for libel by one of Rukhin's guests at the time of the fire.
