= Lidiya Masterkova =

Russian-French painter (1927–2008)

- Born: 8 March 1927; Moscow, Russia
- Died: 12 May 2008 (aged 81); Saint-Laurent-sur-Othain, France
- Known for: Painting
- Movement: Abstract Expressionism
- Partner: Vladimir Nemukhin

Lidiya Masterkova, also Lydia Masterkova, (Russian: Лидия Мастеркова, 1927 in Moscow, USSR – 12 May 2008 in Saint Laurent, France) was a Soviet-born French painter, and part of the non-conformist Lianozovo Group along with Oscar Rabin. She was strongly influenced by Abstract Expressionism, which she was exposed to at the exhibition of foreign artists held during the World Festival of Youth and Students in Moscow (1957).

Masterkova studied under Mikhail Perutski at the Moscow Secondary School of Art (1943–46), the Vasily Surikov School of Art (1946) and Moscow Regional School of Art (1947–50). A dedicated abstractionist, Masterkova was associated with the Lianozovo Group, a diverse group of artists and poets who fought steadfastly and uncompromisingly for creative freedom. One of these artists, Vladimir Nemukhin, lived with her, although they never married.

One of the significant personalities in the Moscow art world of the 1960s, Masterkova's work at the beginning of that decade included loosely painted watercolors in bright colors. Soon after, she darkened her palette and in the mid 1960s, her work was characterized by abstract compositions created with a palette knife in which dark, craggy forms contrasted with a light background. By the end of the decade, she began incorporating lace and brocade collected from abandoned churches into her compositions. She felt these items were filled with a kind of mysticism.

In the early 1970s, these dark, brooding forms were still in evidence, but superimposed by collages of white circles bearing the numerals 0, 1, and 9. She also created subtle, circular, black and white compositions by manipulating India ink or watercolor on wet paper, often affixing collage elements cut out of white paper.

During this period, Masterkova contributed to apartment exhibitions in Russia, foreign exhibitions, and the first shows of nonconformist art, including the first autumnal review, "In the open air" ("Bulldozer Exhibition") in 1974 in Belyayevo. Shortly afterwards, in 1975, she moved with her son to France, where she worked with the Galerie Dina Vierny in Paris (1976) and held a one-woman show called Adieu à la Russie (1977).

Composition by Masterkova

Lydia Masterkova tended to work in cycles and series, the most famous of which is "Planets" (1976). Her work resides in numerous museums and private collections, including the Museum of Modern Art in New York, the Zimmerli Art Museum in New Jersey, and the Tretyakov Gallery in Moscow, which held a retrospective of her work in 2006.

She died in 2008 at the age of 81 and was buried in Saint-Laurent-sur-Othain in Lorraine.

== Bibliography ==
- Kolodzei, Natalia. 4+4: Two Generations of Russian Avant-Garde. Mimi Ferzt Gallery, New York, 2001. Exhibition catalogue.
- Rosenfeld, Alla (editor); Norton Dodge (editor). From Gulag to Glasnost : Nonconformist Art from the Soviet Union. Thames and Hudson/The Jane Voorhees Zimmerli Art Museum, Rutgers, 1995.
- T. Smorodinskaya (Editor), K. Evans-Romaine (Editor), H. Goscilo (Editor). Encyclopedia of Contemporary Russian Culture (Encyclopedias of Contemporary Culture). Routledge, 2007.
