= Boris Smelov =

- Born: March 13, 1951; Leningrad, USSR
- Died: January 18, 1998 (aged 46); Saint-Petersburg, Russia
- Known for: Photographer and painter

Boris Smelov, Petit-Boris (March 13, 1951 — January 18, 1998) was a Russian and Soviet photographer considered a master of still life, portraits, and urban landscapes. Smelov was the founder of the ‘unofficial photography’ of the 1970s—1990s and is considered as one of the most outstanding Soviet underground artists.

== Life and work ==
Boris was born in Leningrad, USSR. As a child he was engaged in painting and studied at the mathematical school in Leningrad. Boris had started showing an interest in photography at the age of 10 and began taking classes at Leningrad's Pioneers’ Palace. He consciously began to take pictures at the age of 17.

In 1968, at one of the meetings of the photo club of the Vyborg Palace of Culture, Smelov met Boris Kudryakov, who introduced him to the circle of Konstantyn Kuzminsky. At the request of Kuzminsky Smelov started shooting portraits of unofficial artists and writers. From 1970 to 1972 Smelov studied at ITMO University, from 1972 to 1973 at the faculty of journalism at the Leningrad State University. In the early 1970s, in addition to the city landscapes and portraits Smelov also started working with still live genre. At this time Boris was already working with two cameras — «Leica» and «Rolleiflex». In those years he did not have a personal laboratory — Smelov developed the films and printed his photos in the Leonid Borganov's darkroom located at the Palace of Culture for workers of the food industry (DC «Pishevik»).

Boris Smelov first received public recognition for his photography work in the 1970s. In 1974 he took part in the first exhibition of independent photography «Under a parachute» conducted at the apartment of Konstantyn Kuzminsky. That is when Smelov got his famous nickname, Petit Boris, invented by Kuzminsky while his comrade Boris Kudryakov was nicknamed Gran-Boris.

In 1976, Smelov presented some of his photographs at the Vyborg District Palace of Culture. Due to nonconformist style of Smelov's works the Soviet authorities closed his exhibition and after that any participation in official exhibitions became impossible. Therefore, until perestroika Smelov participated only in illegal apartment exhibitions.

In 1977, he received the Gold Medal for the reportage series at the 11th International Photo Salon in Bucharest. Later Smelov became largely associated with the Mitki group, an art movement emerged from Vladimir Shinkarev's literary work Mitki (1984-1990), which expresses the anxieties surrounding Perestroika in the 1980s. During Perestroika, Boris Smelov began to participate in exhibitions intensively in USSR and abroad including Great Britain, Germany, United States, Finland, Norway, among others. In 1991 he went to Washington, where he took part in the exhibition «Changing Reality». Main theme of Smelov's work was Leningrad — Saint-Petersburg. His name is associated with the notion of ‘Saint-Petersburg still life’. He was using old objects from Saint-Petersburg households to create still life images filled with deep nostalgia for the past. Smelov died at the age of forty-seven in 1998 in Saint-Petersburg. He was buried on January 24 at the Smolensk Orthodox cemetery.

Boris Smelov's works can be found in private and public collections in Russia, USA, France, Sweden, Italy, Great Britain, Germany and Austria. His works are being compared with the pillars of the world photography such as works of Cartier-Bresson, Doyen and Curtis.

== Personal life ==
From 1974 to 1976 Smelov was in a relationship with clandestine street photographer Masha Ivashintsova, whose works were discovered by her relatives in the family attic and made public. Soon following his separation from Ivashintsova, Smelov began a relationship with a Russian painter, Natalia Zhilina. They married in the late 1970s in Leningrad. Boris Smelov adopted Natalia's children, Dmitry Shagin and Maria Snigirevskaya, who took interest in photography in 1979 thanks to her stepfather Boris Smelov, who had already been a recognized photographer by that time.

== Selected exhibitions ==
2018, Hermitage, Saint-Petersburg, Russia

2017, Columbus Museum of Art, Columbus, USA

2012-2013, Frolov Gallery, Winzavod, Moscow, Russia

2012, Lumiere Brothers Center, Moscow, Russia

2012, Rosphoto, Saint-Petersburg, Russia

2012, FotoFest, Houston, USA

2012, Nailya Alexander Gallery, New York, USA

2011, Sputnik Gallery, New York, USA

2010, Photographic museum «House Metenkova», Ekaterinburg, Russia

2009, Hermitage, Saint-Petersburg, Russia

2004, The State Central Museum Of Contemporary History Of Russia, Moscow, Russia
