= Sergei Smelov =

Russian footballer and coach

Personal information
- Full name: Sergei Vladislavovich Smelov
- Date of birth: 20 May 1969 (age 57)
- Place of birth: Moscow, Russian SFSR
- Height: 1.83 m (6 ft 0 in)
- Position: Goalkeeper

Youth career
- FC Dynamo Moscow

Senior career*
Years	Team	Apps	(Gls)
1987–1989	FC Dynamo-2 Moscow	14	(0)
1989	FC Oka Kolomna	1	(0)
1990–1991	FC Dinamo Sukhumi	32	(0)
1992	FC Tekstilshchik Kamyshin	7	(0)
1992	→ FC Tekstilshchik-d Kamyshin (loan)	1	(0)
1993–1994	FC Chernomorets Novorossiysk	36	(0)
1996	FC Khimki (amateur)		
1997–1999	FC Khimki	82	(0)
2000	FC Klin		
2001	FC Khimki-2 Khimki		
2005	FC VFO Khimki		

Managerial career
- 2013: FC Khimki (youth school)
- * Club domestic league appearances and goals

Sergei Vladislavovich Smelov (Russian: Сергей Владиславович Смелов; born 20 May 1969 in Moscow) is a Russian football coach and a former player.
