= Metarealism =

Direction in Russian poetry and art

Metarealism is a movement in Russian poetry and visual art that emerged during the 1970s and 1980s. The term was coined by Mikhail Epshtein in 1981 and first appeared publicly in the Soviet literary journal Voprosy Literatury in 1983. Poets associated with the movement include Konstantin Kedrov, Viktor Krivulin, Elena Katsyuba, Elena Shvarts, Ivan Zhdanov, Aleksandr Yeryomenko, Svetlana Kekova, Yuri Arabov, Alexei Parshchikov, Sergei Nadeem, and Nikolai Kononov, among others.

== Background and definition ==
Epshtein described metarealism as "metaphysical realism" in its philosophical dimension and "metaphorical realism" in its stylistic character. The prefix "meta" carries the double sense of "through" and "beyond" observable reality; metarealism is therefore concerned with the hyperphysical nature of things. Unlike surrealism, which draws on the subconscious, metarealism appeals to what its proponents call the superconscious, seeking a many-dimensional perception of the world.

The movement gained wider attention after it became a topic of debate at a House of Artists exhibition of hyperrealists, where its potential as a new creative method—capable of moving beyond traditional realism—was discussed.

Following postmodernism, metarealism also acquired significance in philosophy. The sharp division between the real and the non-real, or between mind-independent and mind-dependent existence, came under criticism through cross-disciplinary inquiry. Metarealism responds by moving past essentialist dualisms, arguing instead that there are multiple modes in which something can be considered "real."

== Concepts ==
=== Metabola ===
The central expressive device of metarealism is the metabola (from Greek, meaning "transfer" or "transition"), a term Epshtein developed alongside his broader theory. The metabola is distinguished from both conventional symbols and ordinary visual metaphors: rather than illustrating one reality through the image of another, it assumes the interpenetration of different but consubstantial realities, opening multiple dimensions of meaning simultaneously. Epshtein described the metabola as drawn from a kind of cultural dictionary or microencyclopedia—compressed and translated from one language to another—so that it conveys a reality composed of interpenetrating dimensions.

For Epshtein, metarealism is ultimately an attempt to restore to language the full range of its figurative and transcendent meanings. He further argued that the entire history of world art—its condensed codes, encyclopedic summaries, and cultural extracts—forms both the premise and source of metarealism.

=== Metaconsciousness ===
Metarealism is closely associated with the idea of metaconsciousness—a mode of awareness that operates beyond ordinary psychological or subjective experience. Rather than depicting reality as filtered through personal emotion or intellect, metarealist art and poetry aims to convey dimensions of reality that lie outside the polarized, fragmented perspective of the individual subject. In this sense, the movement has been compared to sacred art traditions, in which artists sought to give visible form to their perception of higher or transcendent dimensions of existence.

As a narrative style, metarealism does not center on a clearly defined lyrical hero. Instead, it focuses on what has been called a "sum of perceptions"—a kind of geometrical space defined by multiple points of view rather than a single subjective voice.

== In poetry ==
Metarealist poetry emerged in the Soviet Union during the late 1970s and 1980s, partly as a response to both official literary doctrine and to the ironic detachment of conceptualism in Russian poetry. The movement sought to recover a sense of metaphysical depth and seriousness in verse without returning to straightforward lyrical realism. Its practitioners employed dense, layered imagery and avoided conventional narrative voice in favor of a multiplicity of perspectives and registers.

== In visual art ==
In visual art, metarealism describes work created from what its theorists call a metaconscious standpoint—work inspired, in their terms, by a higher rather than a subconscious self. Critics associated with the movement, such as Bernard De Montréal, have argued that much contemporary visual art instead expresses the frustrated searching of the unconscious self, and that metarealist art offers an alternative: a conscious engagement with higher dimensions of experience, rather than the assertion of individual personality or cultural identity.

Metarealist visual art also intersects with the broader philosophical use of the term, exploring the relations between different dimensions of reality and the way human beings interpret them through imagery and symbol.

== See also ==
- Russian literature
- Postmodernism
- Surrealism
- Mikhail Epstein
