= Mark Lipovetsky =

Russian-American critic (born 1964)

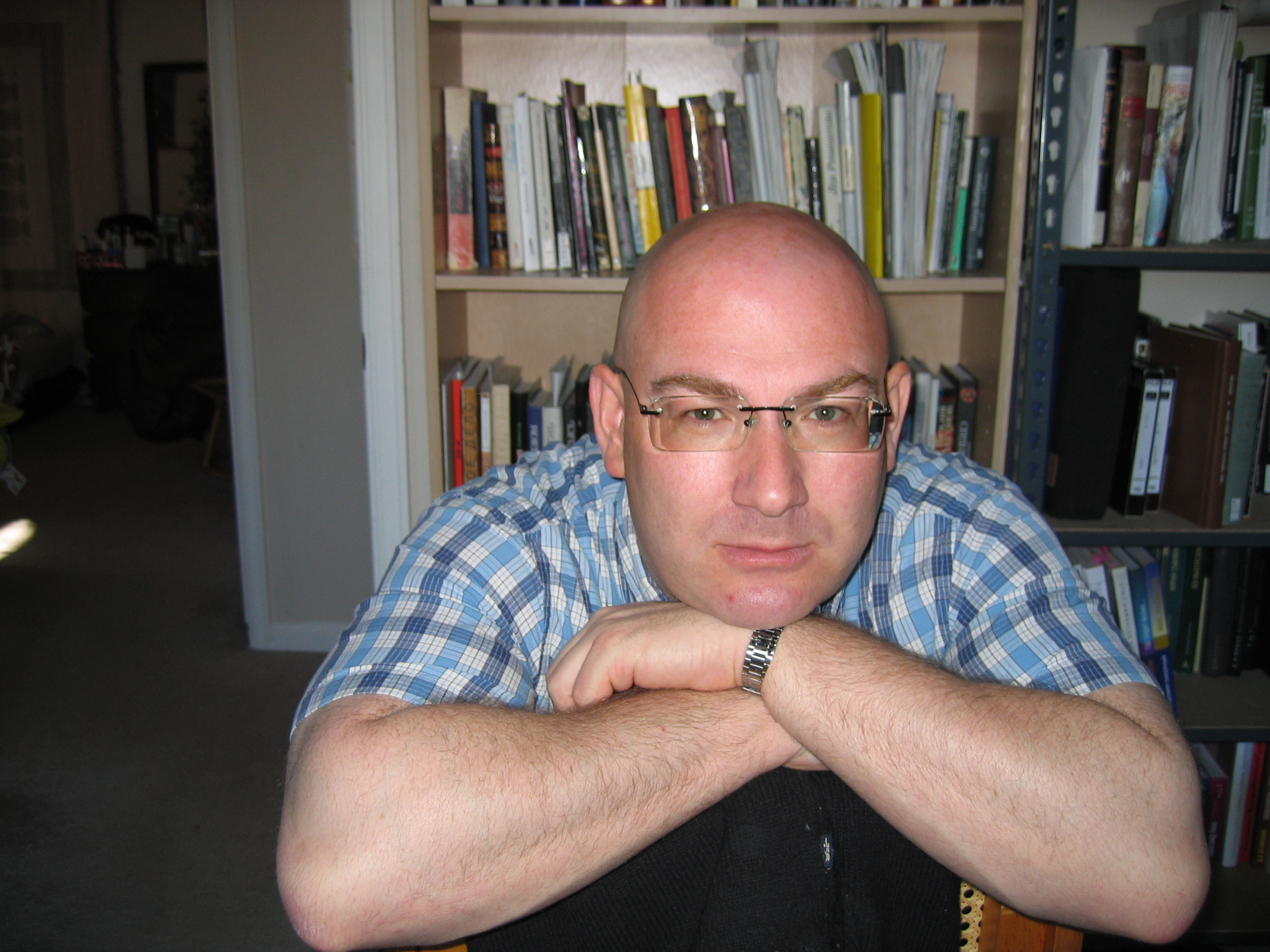
Lipovetsky in 2005

Mark Naumovich Lipovetsky (Russian: Mарк Наумович Липовецкий; born June 2, 1964) is a Russian literary, film, and cultural critic who advocates the position that postmodernism is replacing socialist realism as the dominant art movement in Russia. His major interests include 20th century Russian literature, Russian postmodernism, fairy-tales, Mikhail Bakhtin's carnival, and totalitarian and post-communist cultures.

== Early life and career ==
Lipovetsky was born in Yekaterinburg, and he attended school there. He moved to the U.S. in 1996. He was a professor within the Department of Germanic and Slavic Languages and Literatures and a joint faculty member of the Comparative Literature Program at the University of Colorado at Boulder. In 2019, he joined the Slavic Department at Columbia University with a goal of focusing on contemporary Russian culture within the Harriman Institute. In 2021, he and Vadim N. Gladyshev received the George Gamow Award, named for the Russian-speaking physicist George Gamow.

Lipovestky is the author or co-author of five books and more than seventy articles. His works include Russian Postmodernist Fiction: Dialogue with Chaos (1999), Russian Postmodernism: The Essays of Historic Poetics (1997), Performing Violence: Literary and Theatrical Experiments of New Russian Drama (2009), and Charms of the Cynical Reason (2011).

== See also ==
- Russian postmodernism
