= Vadim Sidur =

Soviet artist

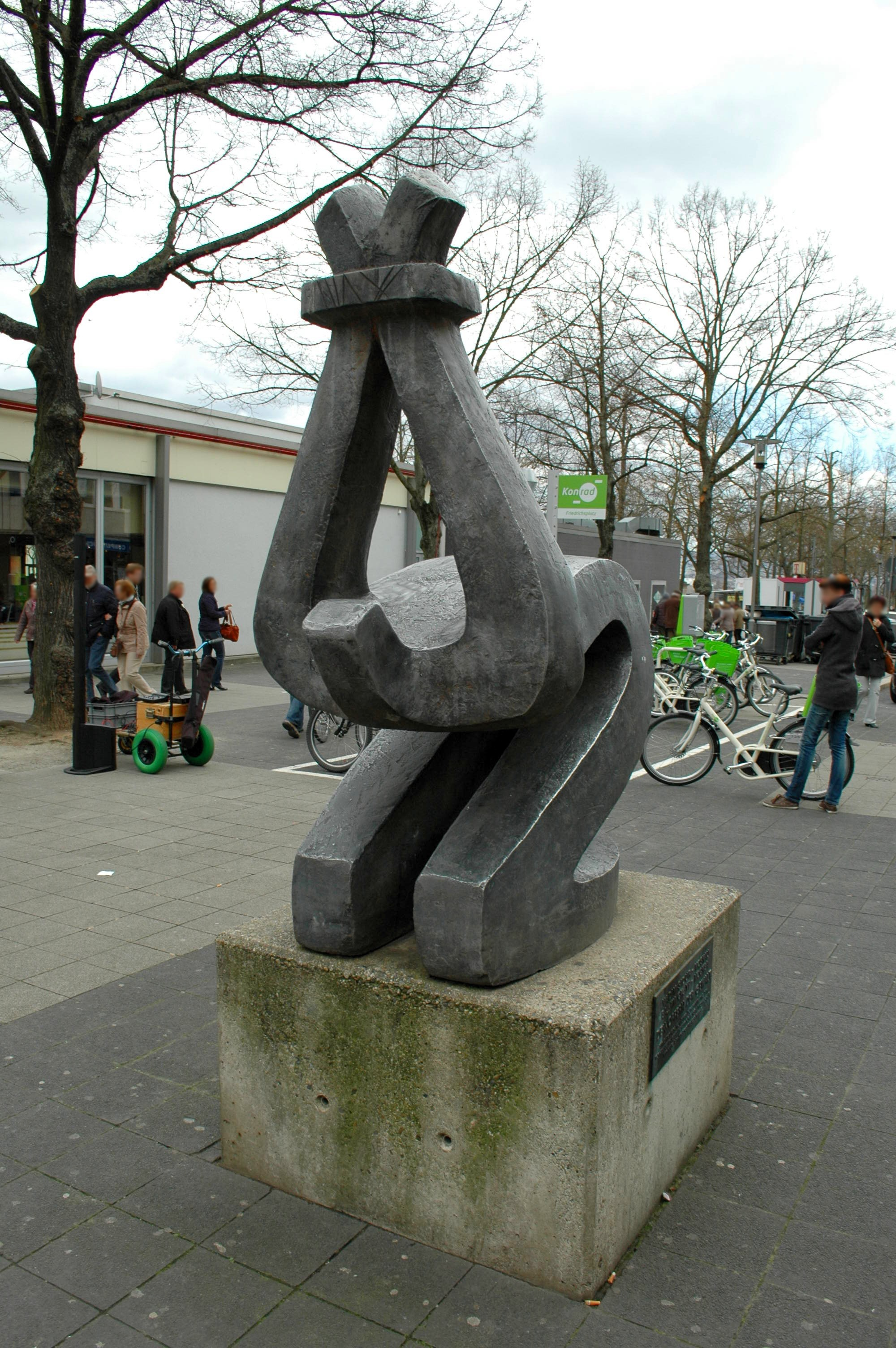
Sidur's monument Victims of Violence, Kassel

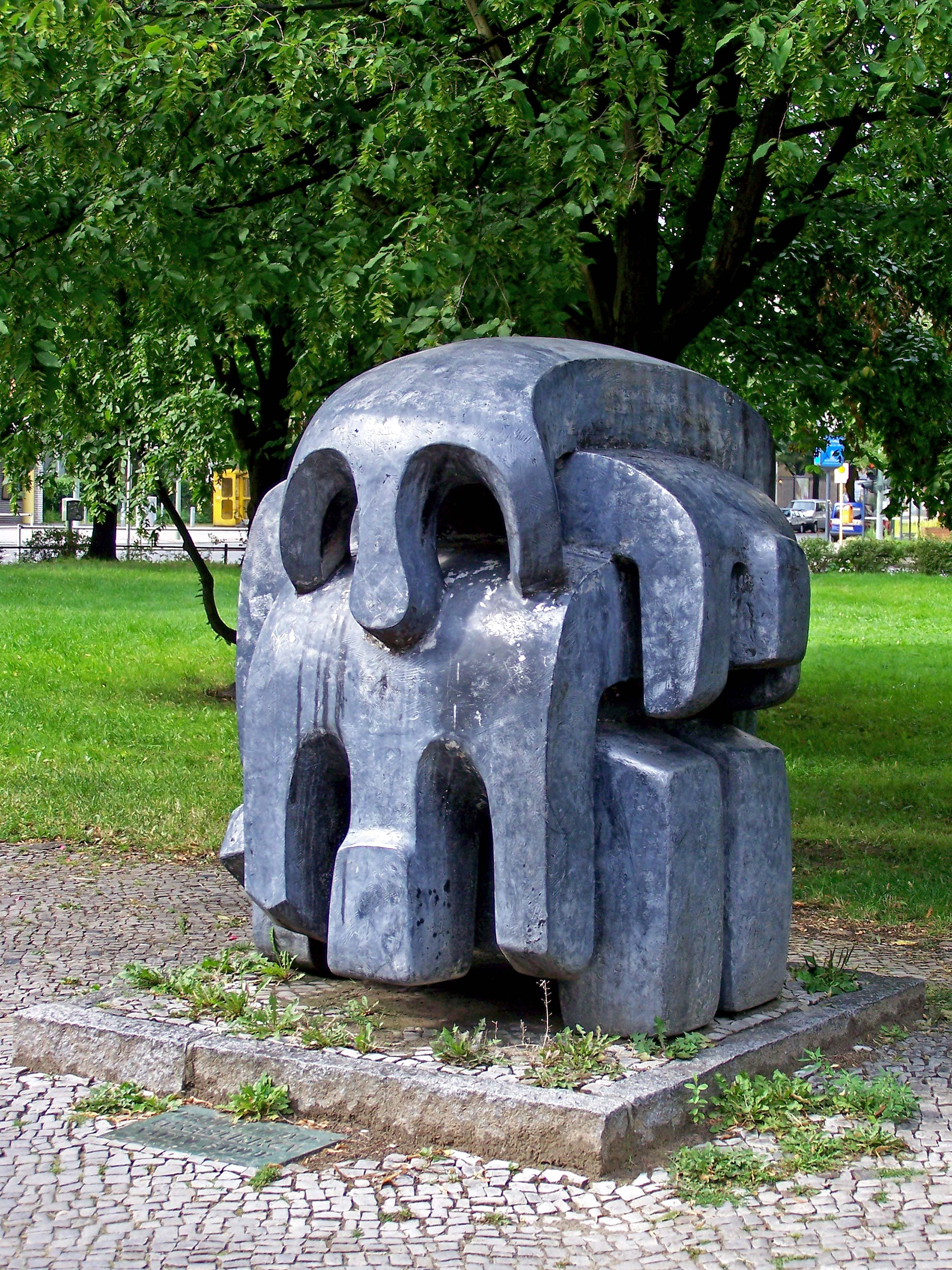
Sidur's monument Treblinka, Berlin

Vadim Abramovich Sidur (Russian: Вади́м Абра́мович Сиду́р; 28 June 1924, Yekaterinoslav — 26 June 1986, Moscow) was a Ukrainian Soviet avant-garde sculptor and artist sometimes referred as the Soviet Henry Moore. Sidur is the creator of a style named Grob-Art (Coffin-Art). He also left a book of poetry The Happiest Autumn (ru: Самая счастливая осень) and a memoir Monuments to the Current State (Памятники современному состоянию).

== Biography ==
Sidur was born in Yekaterinoslav (currently Dnipro, Ukraine) to a Jewish father and Russian mother. One of the most memorable childhood memories was the events concerned the Holodomor of 1932-1933. Particularly, Vadim Sidur mentions mass mortality from famine in the villages, cases of corpse-eating and cannibalism, and nutrition by surrogates in his autobiographical work "Monument to the Current state". He also talks about the work of the Torgsin system. In particular, his mother exchanged a silver spoon for a kilogram of flour in this shop in Dnipropetrovsk. In 1942, he was drafted into the Red Army and fought in the battles of World War II near his hometown. After being wounded in the jaw by a bullet, he was discharged as a disabled veteran. Sidur abandoned his plans to study medicine and entered Stroganov Moscow State University of Arts and Industry in Moscow instead, where his teachers were Georgy Motovilov and Saul Rabinovich. In 1957, he became a member of the Union of Artists of USSR.

During the early period, he created realistic ceramic sculpture. There were also such works as Heads of the Blinds, Portrait of Ernst Neizvestny cut out of rock. In the 1950s, Sidur's art deviated from the official canon, and he completely abandoned it in 1959, developing his own art language.

In the 1960s, he produced the sculpture series of Monuments (Монументы), almost all of which are now indeed public monuments in the squares of Russia and the West. In that work and the related series Disabled (Инвалиды), he tried to condense artistic form to a symbol, a sign, or a formula.

Later, he worked on his own philosophy centered around the artist, prophet of future global catastrophes. An incarnation of this idea in art became his style of Grob-Art, that Sidur saw as a new direction in art. In 1974, he worked on the book Monuments to the Current State (Памятники современному состоянию) that he self-described as a myth. He also shot an underground movie based on the book. He worked on sculpture series Man and Woman, Motherhood. In the 1980s, shortly before his death, he wrote a book of poetry titled The Most Happy Autumn (Самая счастливая осень).

Since the 1960s, Sidur's works became known in the West. Soon, he became famous. In the Soviet Union, his works were not exhibited from 1950 until his death, with the exception of the one-day exhibition in the House of Writers in Moscow in 1968.

== Vadim Sidur's Museum ==
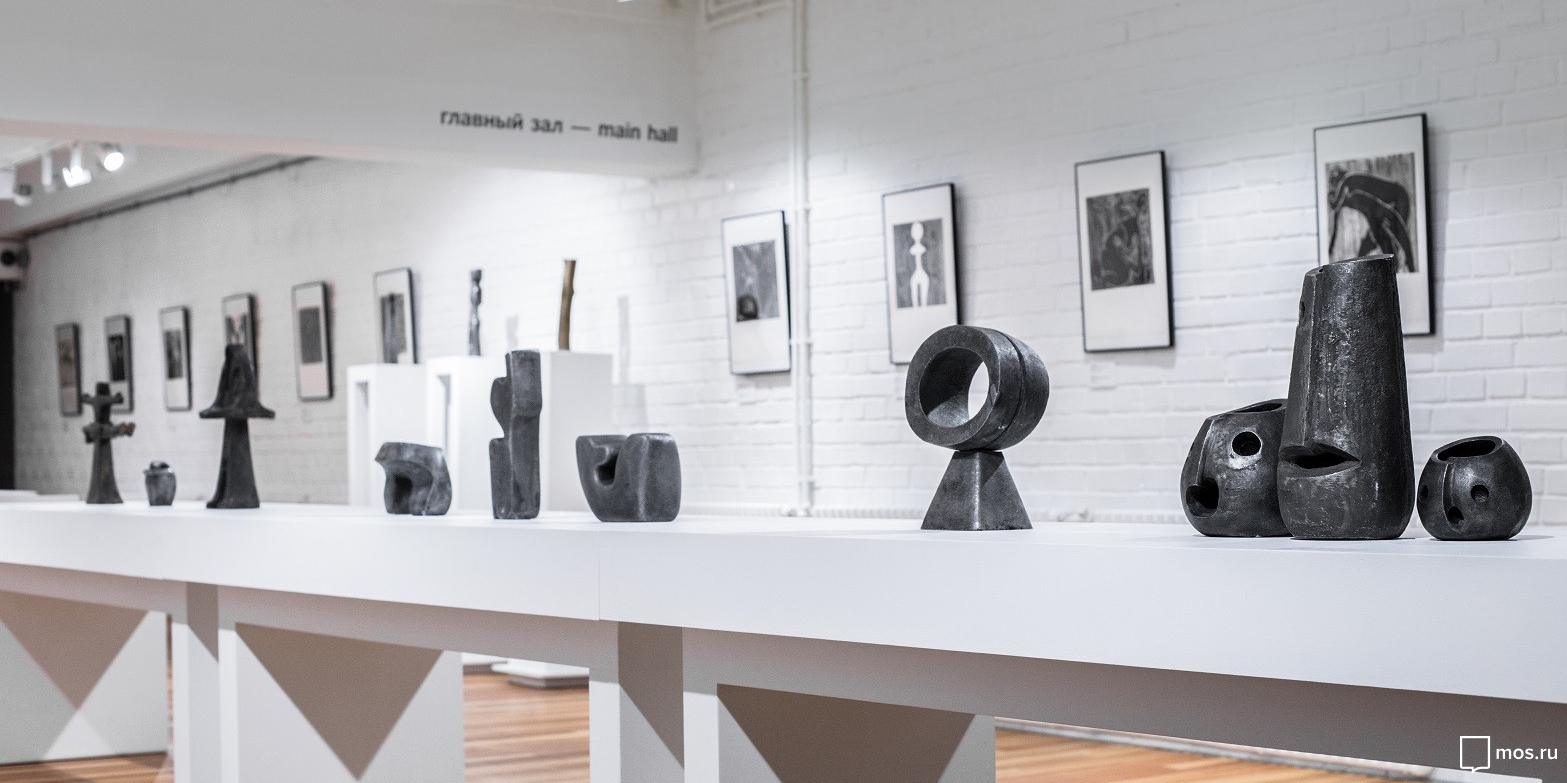
Vadim Sidur's Museum

After Sidur's death and with the onset of perestroika, there was established Vadim Sidur's Museum and the artistic legacy of Sidur was recognized as a national treasure. During 2011-2017, it was a branch of the Moscow Manege exhibition complex. Since 2018, it is a branch of the Moscow Museum of Modern Art. It holds over 1,000 sculptures and graphical works of Sidur, as well as archival materials, photographs, and publications about Sidur. It is located at 37A Novogireyevskays str., near the crossing with Zelyony Prospekt.
