= Alexander Melamid =

Russian-American artist

Alexander Melamid (/ˈmɛləmɪd/; Russian: Алекса́ндр Дани́лович Мелами́д; born July 14, 1945) is a Russian-born conceptualist and performance artist.

== Biography ==
Melamid was born into a Jewish family of Daniel Melamid, a Soviet historian living in Moscow. In his early life, he attended the Stroganov Art Institute, where he collaborated with Vitaly Komar in the Russian Sots art movement (a parallel to the Western pop art movement). Known as a cynical Social Realist, Melamid began collaborating with Komar in the late 1960s; the two emigrated together to New York City from the Soviet Union in 1977. The duo created collaborative works as "Komar and Melamid". In 2003, the two artists decided to go their separate ways. Around this time, Melamid's first-born son, Dan, introduced him to the world of hip-hop, which included his clients and close friends Whoo Kid and 50 Cent. Melamid was intrigued by hip-hop society because of its rich history and world appeal, and began to paint the hip-hop portraits that have become his first solo exhibition since splitting with Komar, on display at the Museum of Contemporary Art Detroit.

Alexander is currently working in Chelsea, NYC at his Art Healing Ministry. Recent new series of works include "Heaven and Hell" and "The Art of Plumbing."

== Sources ==
- "HOLY HIP-HOP!" Museum of Contemporary Art. 20 Aug. 2008
