= Dmitri Prigov =

Russian writer, artist, and Soviet dissident

- Дмитрий Александрович Пригов
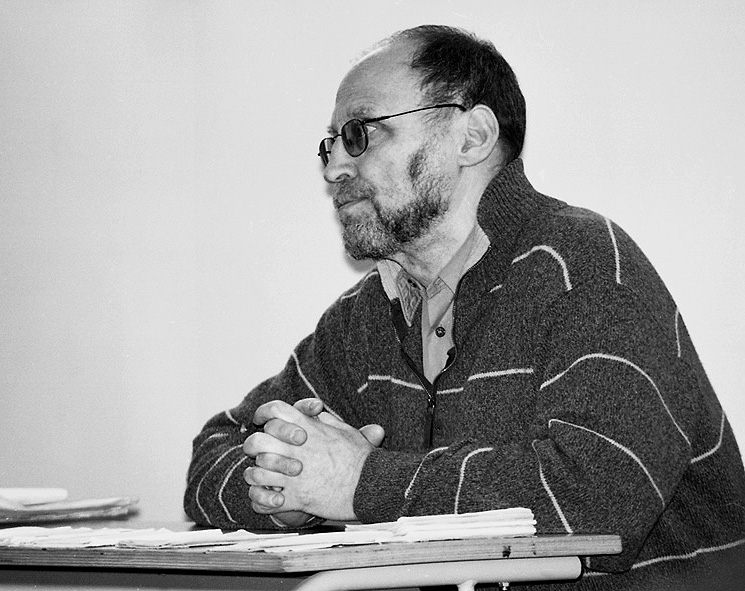
- Prigov in 2005
- Born: 5 November 1940; Moscow, Soviet Union
- Died: 16 July 2007 (aged 66); Moscow, Russian Federation
- Citizenship: Soviet Union (1940–1991) → Russian Federation (1991–2007)
- Occupations: Writer, artist
- Writing career
- Period: Contemporary
- Movements: Russian postmodernism Moscow Conceptualists

Dmitri Aleksandrovich Prigov (Russian: Дми́трий Алекса́ндрович При́гов, 5 November 1940 – 16 July 2007) was a Russian writer and artist. Prigov was part of the unofficial Moscow Conceptualists during the era of the Soviet Union and was briefly sent to a psychiatric hospital in 1986.

== Early life and career ==
Born in Moscow, Russian SFSR, Prigov started writing poetry as a teenager. He was trained as a sculptor, however, at the Stroganov Art Institute in Moscow and later worked as an architect as well as designing sculptures for municipal parks.

== Artistic career ==
Prigov and his friend Lev Rubinstein were leaders of the conceptual art school started in the 1960s viewing performance as a form of art. He was also known for writing verse on tin cans.

He was a prolific poet having written nearly 36,000 poems by 2005. For most of the Soviet Era, his poetry was circulated underground as Samizdat. It was not officially published until the end of the Communist era. His work was widely published in émigré publications and Slavic studies journals well before it was officially distributed.

In 1986, the K.G.B arrested Prigov, who performed a street action by handing poetic texts to passers-by, and sent him to a psychiatric institution before he was freed after protests by poets such as Bella Akhmadulina.

From 1987 he started to be published and exhibited officially, and in 1991 he joined the Writers' Union. He had been a member of the Artists' Union from 1975.

Prigov took part in an exhibition in the USSR in 1987: his works were presented in the framework of the Moscow projects "Unofficial Art" and "Modern Art". In 1988 his personal exhibition took place in the US, in Struve's Gallery in Chicago. Afterwards his works were many times exhibited in Russia and abroad.

Prigov also wrote the novels Live in Moscow and Only My Japan, and was an artist with works at the Moscow Museum of Modern Art. He had many strings to his bow writing plays and essays, creating drawings, video art and installations and even performing music.

Prigov, together with philosopher Mikhail Epstein, is credited with introducing the concept of "new sincerity" (novaia iskrennost' ) as a response to the dominant sense of absurdity in late Soviet and post-Soviet culture. Prigov referred to a "shimmering aesthetics" that (as explained by Epstein) "is defined not by the sincerity of the author or the quotedness of his style, but by the mutual interaction of the two."

In 1993 Prigov was awarded Pushkin Prize of Alfred Toepfer Stiftung F.V.S. and in 2002 he won Boris Pasternak Prize.

Dmitri Prigov died from a heart attack in 2007, aged 66, in Moscow. He had been planning an event where he would sit in a wardrobe reading poetry while being carried up 22 flights of stairs at Moscow State University by members of Voina Group.

In 2011 Hermitage Museum presented an important monographic exhibition of Prigov's art in Venice during 54th Biennale.

== Spelling of his name ==
Prigov's name in his native Russian Cyrillic lettering, Дми́трий Алекса́ндрович При́гов, has been rendered in English in various ways, with variations in the spelling of his first and middle names:

- Dimitri Prigov – Associated Press, The New York Times
- Dimitrii Aleksandrovich Prigov
- Dimitrij Aleksandrovich Prikov, Russian Literature, a periodical
- Dmitry Aleksandrovich Prigov – Encyclopædia Britannica
- Dimitry Prigov – The St. Petersburg Times (English language, Russia) The Moscow Times

== Selected filmography ==
- Khrustalyov, My Car! (1998)
- Taxi Blues (1990)
