= Komar and Melamid =

Russian artist duo

- Born: Vitaly Komar; September 11, 1943 (age 82); Moscow, Russian SSR Alexander Melamid; July 14, 1945 (age 80); Moscow, Russian SSR
- Education: Moscow Art School; Stroganov Institute of Art and Design
- Known for: Painting, performance, installation, sculpture, photography, music, poetry
- Notable work: Stalin Monument; The People's Choice Music
- Movement: Sots, postmodern, conceptual

Komar and Melamid (Russian: Комар и Меламид) is a tandem team of Russian-American conceptualist artists Vitaly Komar (born 1943) and Alexander Melamid (born 1945). In an artists' statement they said that "even if only one of us creates some of the projects and works, we usually sign them together. We are not just an artist, we are a movement." Both artists were born in Moscow, but emigrated to Israel in 1977 and subsequently to New York in 1978. The pair's co-authorship of works ceased in 2003–2004.

== Education ==
Vitaly Anatolyevich Komar (Виталий Анатольевич Комар) and Alexander Danilovich Melamid (Александр Данилович Меламид) attended the Moscow Art School from 1958 to 1960, followed by the Stroganov Institute of Art and Design (Illustration dept.), graduating in 1967. They began working together shortly thereafter. After 36 years they separated in 2003.

== History ==
Komar & Melamid's first joint exhibition, Retrospectivism, was held at the Blue Bird Cafe in Moscow, 1967. The following year, they joined the youth section of the Moscow Union of Artists and began teaching art. In 1972, Komar & Melamid founded a movement they called Sots Art, a unique version of Soviet Pop and Conceptual Art that combines the principles of Dadaism and Socialist Realism." In 1974, they were arrested during a performance (in a Moscow apartment) of Art Belongs to the People. Later that year, their Double Self-Portrait (similar to dual portraits of Lenin and Stalin) was destroyed by the Soviet government, along with works by other nonconformist artists, at what became known as the Bulldozer Exhibition (because bulldozers were used to destroy the artwork, which had been displayed in an open-air setting).

In 1976, Komar & Melamid's work became more widely known. Ronald Feldman Fine Arts, New York, hosted their first international exhibition, but Soviet authorities denied them permission to attend. In 1976, they also made their first attempt at emigrating, but permission was denied. In response, they created their own country, "Trans-State," complete with passports and a constitution. In 1977, they received permission to join relatives in Israel. In 1978, they moved to New York; in the same month, their first museum exhibition opened at the Wadsworth Atheneum in Hartford, Connecticut.

Throughout the 1970s, Komar & Melamid also worked in a style they called "Post-Art," pioneering the use of multi-stylistic images, prefiguring the eclectic combination of styles in post-modernism, which became popular in the 1980s. They collaborated on various conceptual projects, ranging from painting and performance to installation, public sculpture, photography, music, and poetry. In one such performance, they established a corporation, Komar & Melamid, Inc., that had as its purpose "the buying and selling of human souls." They bought several hundred souls, including Andy Warhol's (who sold it to them for free), which was smuggled into Russia and then sold for 30 roubles.

Melamid moved to New Jersey in 1980. He continued to work with Komar in New York. In 1981, their Portrait of Hitler was slashed by an ex-Trotskyist disc jockey in Brooklyn. They did not repair the work, considering the attacker a co-author.

Ronald Feldman hosted the exhibition Sots Art in 1982, which was a commercial and critical success. In 1983, the Museum of Modern Art and the Metropolitan Museum of Art purchased paintings. From 1981 to 1983, they continued to develop Sots Art in the series Nostalgic Socialist Realism, and from 1984 to 1990 they further developed Post-Art in the Diary Series, Anarchistic Synthesis Series, and Bayonne, N.J. Series.

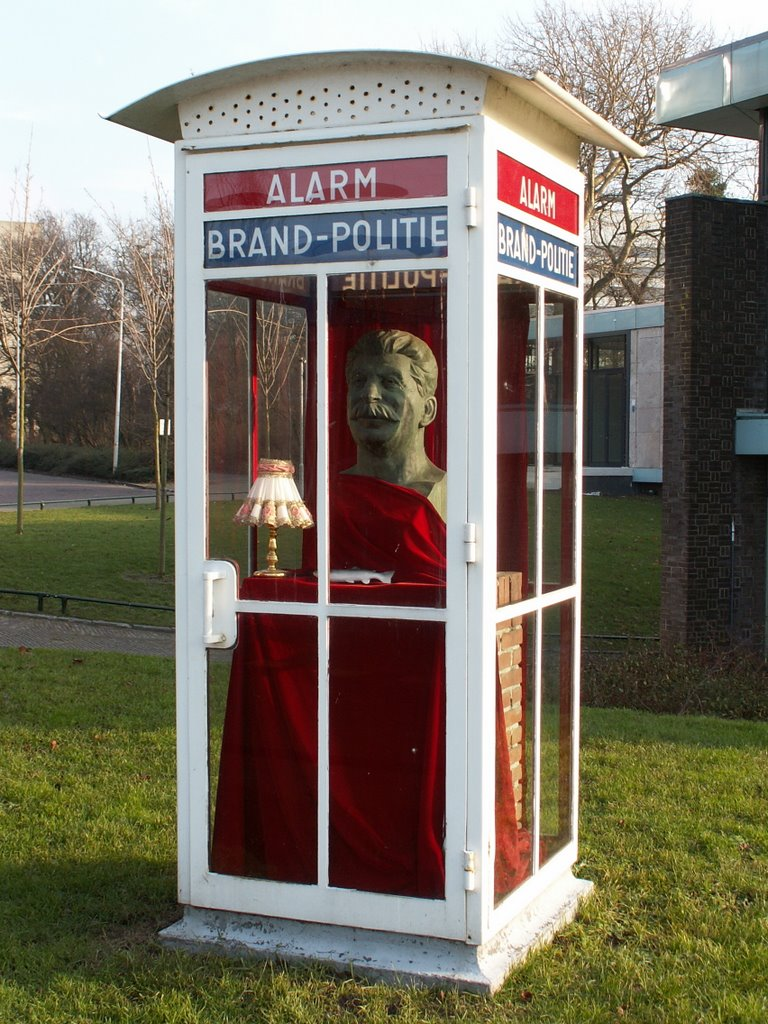
The Stalin Monument (The Hague) (2006)

Throughout the 1980s, many prominent writers and critics discussed their work, and they were invited to participate in numerous exhibitions. They were the first Russian artists to receive funding from the National Endowment for the Arts. They were also the first Russian artists to be invited to Documenta (Kassel, then in West Germany, 1987).

Komar & Melamid created their first public art sculpture in 1986, a bronze bust of Joseph Stalin, which was installed in the red light district of The Hague, Netherlands. In 1988, they became US citizens. In 1989, a monograph about them, written by Carter Ratcliff, was published by Abbeville Press.

In the early 1990s, Komar & Melamid created two icons for the Holy Rosary Church in Jersey City. In 1992, they began the series Monumental Propaganda, in response to the destruction of Socialist Realist monuments in Russia. At Komar & Melamid's invitation, more than 200 Russian and Western artists created projects for the preservation of monuments. Prolific press coverage of the project forestalled destruction of monuments in Russia.

From 1994 to 1997, the artists worked on the series People's Choice, whereby they created the "most wanted" and "least wanted" paintings of various countries based on the results of surveys conducted by professional polling companies. The book, Painting by Numbers: Komar & Melamid's Scientific Guide to Art, published in 1997, explains the statistical underpinnings of the polling process and provides the results of each country's preferences. Komar & Melamid used the same process in 1996–1997 in a collaboration with composer Dave Soldier to create The People's Choice Music, consisting of "The Most Wanted Song" (a love song with low male and female vocals, of moderate duration, pitch, and tempo) and "The Most Unwanted Song" (in part: an operatic soprano raps over cowboy music featuring least-wanted instruments bagpipes and tuba while children sing about holidays and advertise for Wal-Mart).

In 1998, Naked Revolution, an opera about George Washington, Vladimir Lenin and Marcel Duchamp, was created by Komar & Melamid with Dave Soldier and performed at the Walker Art Center, Minneapolis, and The Kitchen, New York. It became part of the exhibition American Dreams, along with a series of eight paintings, forty collages, and the artists' collection of George Washington memorabilia.

In 1998, the artists also went to Thailand to teach elephants to paint, resulting in the book, When Elephants Paint: The Quest of Two Russian Artists to Save the Elephants of Thailand. In 2000, Christie's auction house held the first-ever auction of elephant paintings. The revenue generated supported the elephants and their keepers.

In 2001, Komar & Melamid began work on their last major project together, Symbols of the Big Bang, first exhibited at the Yeshiva University Museum, Center for Jewish History, New York. Using abstract symbols, the artists explored their spirituality and the connection between mysticism and science. In 2003, they began to turn some of the symbols into stained glass, which Russian authorities refused to exhibit during the Moscow portion of the exhibition, Berlin-Moscow/Moscow-Berlin (2004). Komar & Melamid ceased collaborating in 2003.

In 2023, The group reunited for a retrospective at the Zimmerli Art Museum at Rutgers University

== Style ==
They are perhaps best known as the founders of SotsArt (СоцАрт), a form of Soviet Nonconformist Art that combined elements of Socialist Realism and Western Pop Art in a conceptual framework that also references Dadaism. Komar and Melamid often create many works within a common theme. Their prolific collaboration precludes from mentioning all of their projects, however, some of their best known series and projects are: Sots Art series (1972–1973), Post-Art series (1973), Ancestral Portraits series (1980), Nostalgic Socialist Realism series (1982–1983), Diary series (1984–1986), Anarchistic Synthesism series (1985–1986), Most-Wanted series (1993–1997), Monumental Propaganda (1994), Elephant Project (1995–2000), American Dreams (1994–1999).

== People's Choice ==
Komar and Melamid's People's Choice series, 1994–1997, consisted of the "most wanted" and "most unwanted" paintings of 11 countries, as well as two songs in the same vein. The artists commissioned polling companies in the 11 countries—including the United States, Russia, China, France, and Kenya—to conduct scientific polls to discover what they want to see in art. The use of polls was meant to mimic the American democratic process. Komar said, "Our interpretation of polls is our collaboration with various people of the world. It is a collaboration with [sic] new dictator—Majority." The process was also meant to change the artists role as a leader. Komar and Melamid believe that the broad public is an adequate judge of art, contrary to the historical precedence, much in the same way that the broad public in America is entrusted with electing the President. It is a new type of leader, one that asks questions, instead of a dictator. Melamid said, "Picasso mimicked Stalin, so we try to mimic Clinton."

Komar has said he isn't so concerned that people actually enjoy the work, so long as it provokes thoughts of free will versus predetermination. To tie that concept into their earlier work, Komar said, "In our early work, we arrived at [the] definition of freedom that entailed being free from individual cliches, being free to change intonations and styles. Individuality lost its stability and its uniqueness. Now we are searching for a new freedom. We have been traveling to different countries, engaging in dull negotiations with representatives of polling companies, raising money for further polls, receiving more of less [the] same results, and painting more or less [the] same blue landscapes. Looking for freedom, we found slavery."

A musical version of The People's Choice was produced with composer Dave Soldier resulting in The Most Wanted Song and The Most Unwanted Song.

== Sources ==
- Ratcliff, Carter. Komar and Melamid, New York: Abbeville Press, 1988. ISBN 0-89659-891-8
- Wypijewski, JoAnn, ed. Painting by Numbers: Komar and Melamid's Scientific Guide to Art, New York: Farrar Straus Giroux, 1997. ISBN 978-0374228804
- Komar and Melamid. When Elephants Paint: The Quest of Two Russian Artists to Save the Elephants of Thailand, New York: HarperCollins, 2000. ISBN 0-06-095352-7
- Nathanson, Melvyn, ed. Komar/Melamid: Two Soviet Dissident Artists, Southern Illinois University Press, 1979. ISBN 9780809308873
- Komar and Melamid The Fruitmarket Gallery, Edinburgh, exhibition catalogue, 1985. ISBN 0-947912-20-7
- Weiss, Evelyn. Komar & Melamid: The Most Wanted and the Most Unwanted Painting, Museum Ludwig Koln, Ostfildern: Cantz, 1997.
- "Komar and Melamid" The Penguin Concise Dictionary of Art HistoryNancy Frazier (ed.) Penguin Reference, New York 2000 ISBN 0-670-10015-3 .
- "Komar and Melamid" Art since the 40s by Jonathan Fineberg
- "Komar und Melamid" Bildende Kunst im 20 Jahrhundert Edward Lucie-Smith (ed.) Könemann in der Tandem Verlags-Gmbh 2002, ISBN 3-8290-1717-0 .
- "Komar and Melamid (1945– )" Who's Who in American Art 23rd edition, 1999–2000. Marquis, New Providence, NJ;
- "Komar and Melamid" Contemporary Artists Fifth edition. Sara Pendergast and Tom Pendergastm (eds.) St. James Press, Detroit, 2002.
- "Komar and Melamid" The Prestel Dictionary of Art and Artists in the 20th Century Prestel Verlag, New York, 2000.
- "Komar and Melamid" World Artists, 1950–1980 Claude Marks (ed.) H.W. Wilson Co., New York, 1984.
- "Komar and Melamid" A Dictionary of Twentieth-Century Art Ian Chilvers (ed.) Oxford University Press, New York 1998 ISBN 0-19-280092-2.
