= Oscar Rabin (artist) =

Russian painter (1928–2018)

Oskar Rabin. "Roses on Preobrazhensky Val" (1966)

Oscar Rabin (Russian: Оскар Яковлевич Рабин; 2 January 1928 – 7 November 2018) was a major Russian painter and activist who defined the core of the Soviet Nonconformist Art movement, affecting the careers of countless painters and sculptors of that era and its aftermath.

== Biography ==
Born in Moscow on January 2, 1928 in the family of doctors Yakov Rakhmilovich Rabin (originally from Ukraine) and Veronika Martynovna Anderman (from Latvia). In 1946-1948 he studied at the Art Academy of Latvia in Riga. In 1948-1949 he studied at the Surikov Art Institute in Moscow. Oscar Rabin was one of the originators of the nonconformism era and a key organizer of what is now referred to as the 'Lianozovo Group', a collective which grew around Yevgeniy Kropivnitskiy (1893-1979). Over a period of seven years (1958-1965), the former camp barracks in Lianozovo, where Oskar Rabin lived with his wife, Valentina Kropivnitskaya, acted as the center of the progressive intelligentsia. Soviet material life and its dramatic absurdity was for many years the central theme of Rabin’s creativity. The artist’s favorite genres included landscape, still life and interiors, continuing in the tradition of 1920s European expressionism. Rabin uses a distortion of perspective, the principles of deformation and the destruction of large-scale relationships.

Along with the writer and collector Alexander Glezer, Oscar Rabin was instrumental in the organization of what is known as the dissident Bulldozer Exhibition, an unofficial art exhibition on a vacant lot in the Belyayevo (ru) urban forest by Moscow avant-garde artists on 15 September 1974. The exhibition was forcefully broken up by a large police force that included bulldozers and water cannons. These events and Rabin's biography have been documented in the two-part documentary Oscar (2018) and In Search of a Lost Paradise (2015).

Subsequently, he participated in the jubilee exhibition on Gogol Boulevard in 1995, dedicated to the 20th anniversary of the exhibition of painting in the pavilion "beekeeping" at the Exhibition of Achievements of National Economy with Eduard Drobitsky, Julia Dolgorukova and other nonconformist artists.

In 1978, Rabin and his family were reportedly stripped of their Soviet passports and citizenship; that year, Rabin emigrated to Paris where he lived until his death at the age of 90 on 7 November 2018.

In November 2016, via a signed Order of the President of the Russian Federation, Oscar Rabin - now long a citizen of France - was granted dual Russian citizenship.

The artist had been predeceased by his wife - Valentina Kropivnitskaya (1924-2008) and their son, Alexandre Rabine (1952-1994), both noted artists as well.

The Catalogue Raisonne of all oil paintings produced by Rabine during his lifetime is being prepared by the London based academic Dr Robert Rabilizirov, who has been working on this project for over 20 years.
