= 1 Moscow Biennale of Contemporary Art =

2005 art exhibition in Moscow, Russia

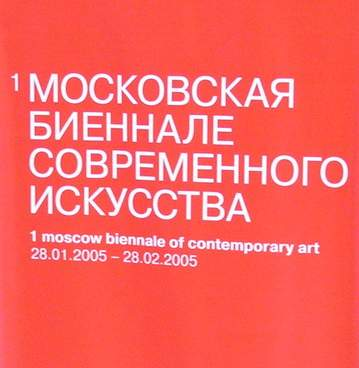
- Poster of the 1 Moscow Biennale
- Genre: Art exhibition
- Begins: January 28, 2005
- Ends: February 28, 2005
- Location: Moscow
- Country: Russia
- Next event: 2 Moscow Biennale of Contemporary Art (2007)

The 1 Moscow Biennale of Contemporary Art was held in Moscow from January 28 to February 28, 2005. This exhibition laid the concept, structure and traditions of the Moscow Biennale, in accordance with which the subsequent shows were held: the division of the Biennale program into three parts - the thematic main project, special projects and a parallel program, - invitation of special guests, appointment of commissioner and a curatorial group with a curator-coordinator, distribution of exhibition sites around the city, publication of a catalog, etc.

The organizers of the Biennale were the Ministry of Culture of the Russian Federation, the Federal Agency for Culture and Cinematography (FACC) and the State Museum and Exhibition Center ROSIZO. The Minister of Culture (since 2004 - the head of FACC) Mikhail Shvydkoy was appointed the chairman of the organizing committee, the commissioner - the director of ROSIZO Evgeny Zyablov, the curator-coordinator - Zyablov's deputy and art critic Joseph Backstein. Russian art theorist Viktor Misiano and the international group of curators - Hans Ulrich Obrist, Daniel Birnbaum, Nicolas Bourriaud, Rosa Martinez, Yara Bubnova and Robert Storr - also took part in the development and implementation of the project.

The Moscow and Venice projects are completely different things. In Moscow we wanted to do something special. A group of curators came here, each with their own ideas, and it is a collective project. <..> We present a new generation of interesting, emerging artists from different countries, from whom we made a focused selection. We had never worked with many of them before. Hans Ulrich Obrist

The theme of the 1 Moscow Biennale was "Dialectics of Hope", and Boris Kagarlitsky was named the Associated Thinker. The main project sites were the V. I. Lenin Museum, the Shchusev Museum of Architecture and the Vorobyovy Gory Moscow Metro station. As part of the main project, 41 artists from 22 countries presented their works.

More than 30 special projects were posted at the Pushkin Museum, the Tretyakov Gallery, the Central House of Artists, the Moscow Museum of Modern Art (MMMA) and the Museum Center of the Russian State University for the Humanities.

The artists Christian Boltanski (France), Bill Viola (United States) and Ilya Kabakov (United States) were invited as special guests.

Moscow exhibitions of contemporary art were selected for the parallel program, which coincided with the Biennale and were announced by galleries and exhibition halls. Thus, about 300 artists took part in the event.

== Background - "The Big Project for Russia" ==
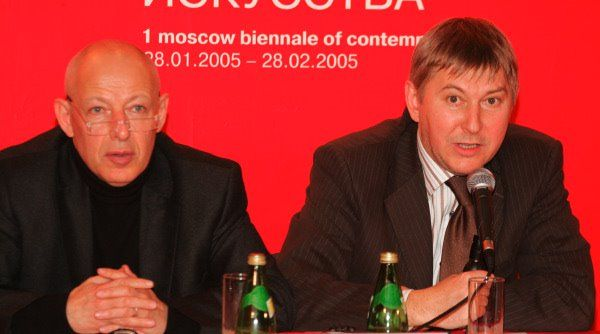
Evgeny Zyablov (right) and Joseph Backstein at the press conference on July 6, 2004

By the mid-1990s, regular large international event were held in Moscow, dedicated to most areas of culture and art: the International Tchaikovsky Competition, the Moscow Film Festival, the Golden Mask Theater Festival, the Moscow International Book Fair and others. An obvious gap in this row was the absence of an event related to contemporary visual arts. By the beginning of the XXI century, the idea of establishing such a forum was literally "in the air" and was often discussed both among cultural figures and among officials.

At the same time, the state began to pursue an active policy in the field of culture, which was in decline after the crisis of the 1990s. This policy was expressed in increasing the participation of the state in the cultural life of the country, primarily through the growth of funding for large-scale cultural projects. The embodiment of the new cultural policy was the federal target program "Culture of Russia (2001-2005)", adopted by the Ministry of Culture.

The key project for the implementation of this program was destined to become a new international event in the field of contemporary art. The idea of holding such an event in Moscow and in the form of a biennale was actively lobbied by art theorist and editor-in-chief of "The Art Magazine" Viktor Misiano, art critic Joseph Bakshtein, as well as the general director of ROSIZO Evgeny Zyablov, whose deputies at that time they both worked. The idea was supported in the ministry and personally by the Minister of Culture Mikhail Shvydkoy, who headed the organizing committee created in 2003 to prepare the Moscow Biennale. 53 million rubles were allocated from the state budget to hold the biennale. The preparation itself, which lasted about two years, was accompanied by a broad public discussion and enthusiasm, expressed in the designation of the initiative - "The Big Project for Russia" (Russian: Большой проект для России).

On January 30–31, 2003 in the Central House of Artists on Krymsky Val, an international symposium organized by ROSIZO took place on the theme "The Big Project for Russia. Problems and Prospects ". Prominent curators from all over the world took part in the symposium, which became the first stage of the implementation of the "Big Project": Francesco Bonami and Germano Celant (Italy), Harald Szeemann and Hans Ulrich Obrist (Switzerland), Rene Block (Germany), Robert Storr (United States). In May, 2003 the Moscow Biennale of Contemporary Art was established by order of the Ministry of Culture.

In the summer and autumn of 2003, Evgeny Zyablov and Victor Misiano took part in the work of the Russian pavilion at the 50th Venice Biennale: Zyablov as commissioner, and Misiano as curator. For Zyablov, this was not the first such experience - a year earlier he worked as Commissioner for a Russian project at the 25th Bienal de São Paulo, and then his partner-curator was Backstein. Thus, at the beginning of the following year, Evgeny Zyablov was appointed Commissioner of the 1 Moscow Biennale of Contemporary Art.

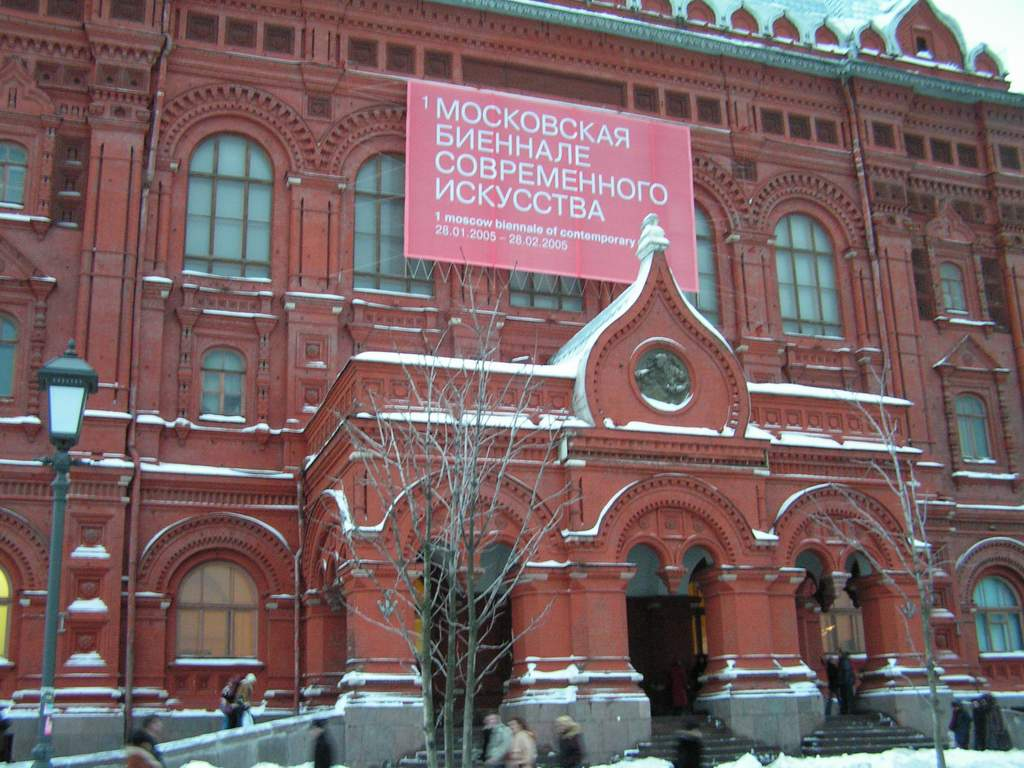
1 Moscow Biennale. Exhibition of the avant-garde of contemporary art. Former V.I.Lenin Museum.

In March 2004, Mikhail Shvydkoy was dismissed from the post of Minister of Culture and appointed head of the Federal Agency for Culture and Cinematography (FACC), so this structure was also involved in organizing the Moscow Biennale. In May, as a result of a conflict in the curatorial group, Victor Misiano left the project.

On July 8, the first major press conference on the upcoming Biennale took place. It was attended by: the head of the FACC Mikhail Shvydkoy, the head of the Department of Contemporary Art of the FACC Maya Kobakhidze, her deputy Alexander Zavolokin, the Biennale Commissioner, the General Director of ROSIZO Evgeny Zyablov and the curator-coordinator of the Biennale Joseph Backstein. The fact of holding the 1st Moscow Biennale of Contemporary Art was finally confirmed. The organizers saw their task in creating an international periodical forum of contemporary art in Russia, able to stand on a par with the Venice Biennale, documenta in Kassel, Ars Electronica in Linz, the European Manifesto, the São Paulo Art Biennial and other festivals. However, it was decided not to copy the structure of other festivals, but to develop their own original concept. This is how the program of the Moscow Biennale was divided into three modules - the main project, special projects and a parallel program. Another important principle was the scattering of the Biennale venues across Moscow, in order to include as much of the urban environment as possible in the forum area. At the press conference, the sites of the main project were named, the main of which at that time was supposed to be the Central House of Artists. The composition of the curatorial group of the main project was also confirmed, which included 6 international curators: Joseph Backstein (curator-coordinator), Daniel Birnbaum (Sweden), Yara Bubnova (Bulgaria), Nicolas Bourriaud (France), Rosa Martinez (Spain) and Hans Ulrich Obrist (Switzerland). An independent and separate curatorial program was announced by Robert Storr (United States).

However, at a regular press conference on September 2, 2004, a significant adjustment to the concept of the forum was announced: the central project was redirected to young (20–30 years old) and unknown ("their names will not tell you anything yet") artists from different countries. Another important news was the transfer of the main site of the main project from the Central House of Artists to the building of the V. I. Lenin Museum on Red Square.

== Main project - "Dialectic of Hope" ==
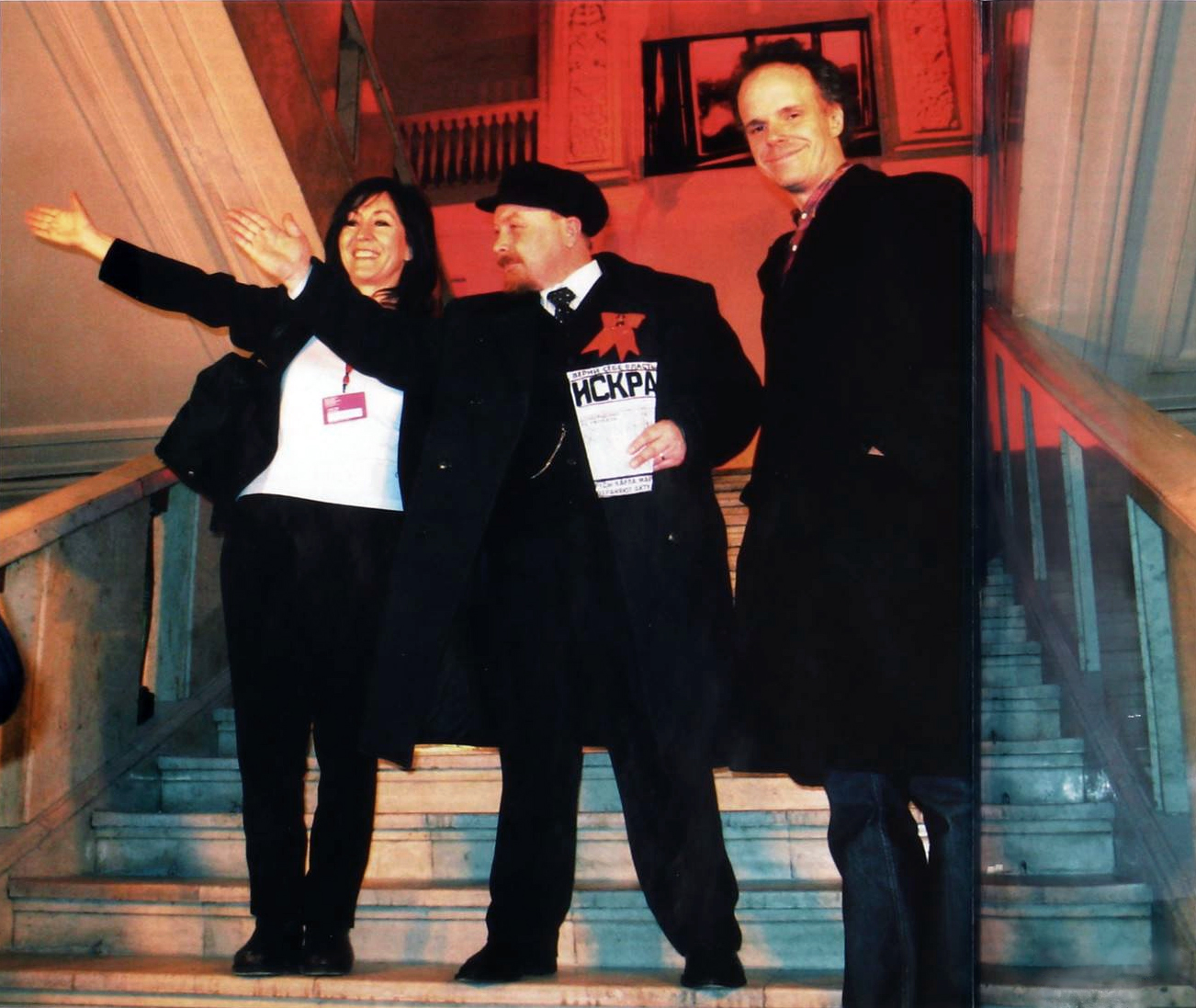
Opening ceremony of the 1st Moscow Biennale of Contemporary Art. Rosa Martinez, "Vladimir Ilyich Lenin" and Hans Ulrich Obrist on the front staircase of the former V.I.Lenin Museum, 28 January 2005

Almost from the very beginning of the preparation, the theme of the Biennale was announced as "The Dialectic of Hope" - after the title of the book by the sociologist and publicist of the left wing Boris Kagarlitsky (1988), which was banned in the Soviet Union. Kagarlitsky himself was declared an "associated thinker", which came as a surprise to him. It has been suggested that this choice was supported by Misiano, who was better versed in the field of New Left ideas than Backstein. The choice of the concept, coupled with the designation of the V.I.Lenin Museum as the main site of the main project, prompted commentators to assume that the entire event was left-leaning. However, Zyablov and Backstein invariably answered journalists' questions that "the project will not be left-wing." The Biennale Commissioner explained in his opening remarks to the catalog:

The main exhibition of the Biennale - "The Dialectic of Hope" - focuses on the concept of "hope" as one of the fundamental experiences of modern man. The Dialectic of Hope is a reflection of the influence of social and political changes taking place in the world on our ideas about our personal and collective future. Evgeny Zyablov

To accommodate the exposition "Dialectics of Hope", the building of the Lenin Museum, which has been part of the State Historical Museum since 1993 and closed to visitors, was freed from the funds stored in it. The organizers understood that they were taking a risky step:

The Biennale is unlikely to cause a culture shock. It has been prepared by many exhibitions of contemporary art in Russia. By world standards, this all looks almost academic. Another thing is that sharp criticism may be caused by the fact that the former Lenin Museum was chosen as the central venue for the Biennale. Let me remind you right away that Lenin was a revolutionary. That is, an actual political artist. <...> So there is no particular hostility from this place to what will be displayed there. Mikhail Shvydkoy

The 1st Moscow Biennale of Contemporary Art opened on January 27: first at the Vorobyovy Gory metro station, then at the Shchusev Museum of Architecture, and late in the evening at the main site, in the former Lenin Museum. The opening was attended by about 1000 people, including 200 foreign guests - critics, artists, journalists, well-known media personalities.

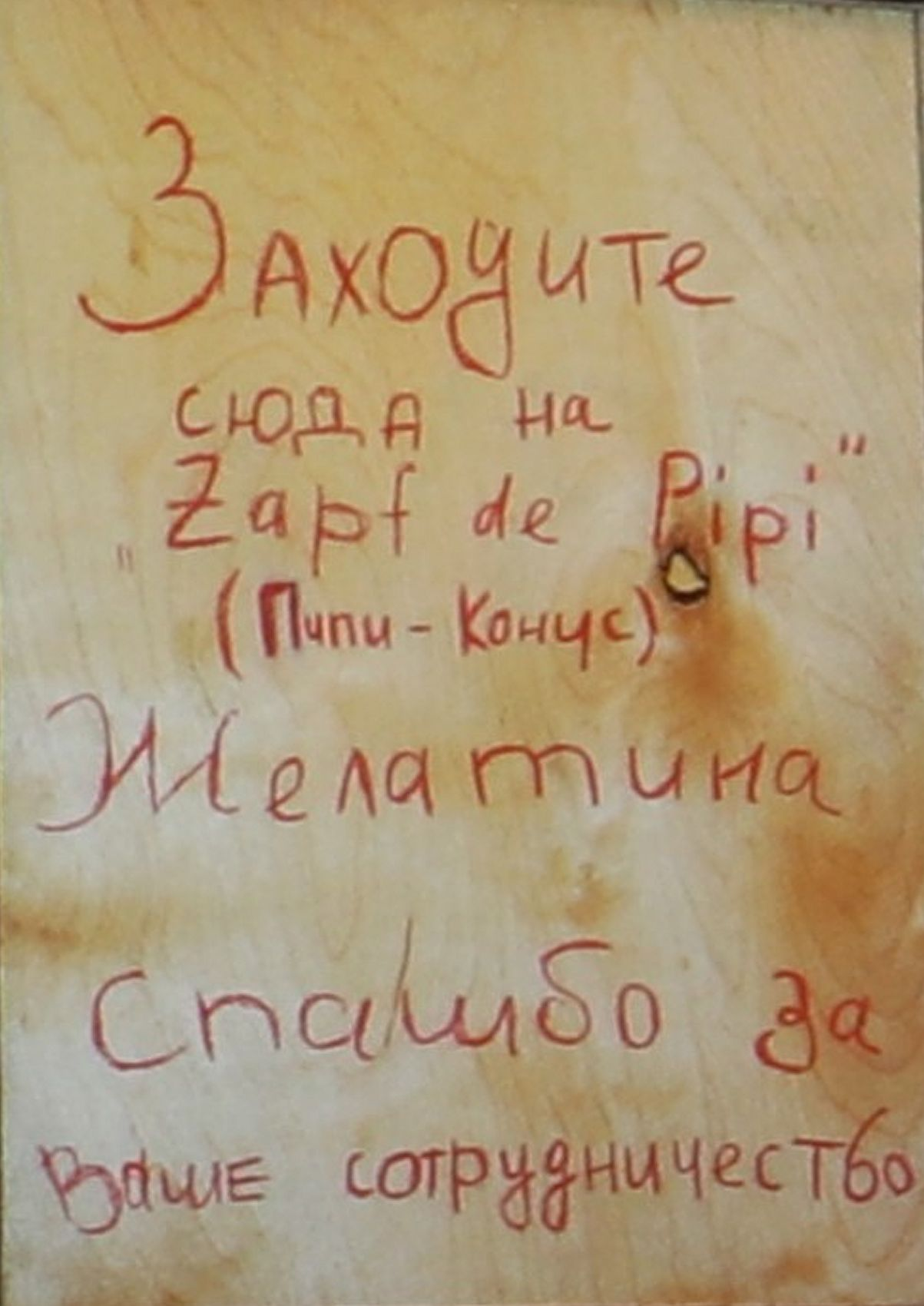
Announcement to draw attention to the action Zapf de Pipi (art group Gelitin, Austria)

The fears were confirmed: during the opening days of the Biennale, the building of the former Lenin Museum was picketed by its employees, and rallies against the content of the exposition were held there. Conservatives - : communists, monarchists, representatives of the Orthodox Church - were harshly criticized in media. The exhibition was criticized for pessimism, "chernukha", the desire to scare and shock the viewer.

Of course, there is some kind of mysticism here, that the Lenin Museum went to the Biennale. Inevitably, the contemporary artists enter into a dialogue with the Soviet past here. Yara Bubnova (curator from Bulgary)

Once in the building of the former museum, the audience first passed through the cinema, in which, as an "epigraph", they demonstrated Mikhail Romm's documentary "Living Lenin", entirely composed of newsreels and once part of the museum exposition. Many of the artists presented at the exhibition also worked with the "theme of the leader", others - with a broader theme of reflection on the revolutionary and totalitarian past. For example, Alexander Shaburov and Vyacheslav Mizin (The Blue Noses Group) visualized Lenin turning over in a coffin (video installation at the bottom of a cardboard box). Konstantin Luser from Austria presented the installation "Lenin's dream" - a graffiti fresco reminiscent of a cobweb or a labyrinth. Chinese artist Shao Fei brought a hundred small bronze figurines of Deng Xiaoping - such figurines were created by her father, a socialist realist artist. French artist Melik Ohanian invited viewers to compose a chain of words on the light panel, leading from the word slave to its anagram valse. Moscow artist David Ter-Oganyan presented the installation "These Are Not Bombs": bottles of cola, pumpkins, cans of vegetables - with wires and alarm clocks tied to them.

The interactive work "Zapf de Pipi" by the Austrian art group Gelitin turned out to be the most radical. The object was a wooden toilet stall protruding from the window onto the street, into the courtyard of the museum, where there were severe February frosts. Anyone could walk into the booth and urinate. In the courtyard, a stalactite of a characteristic yellow color hung down, which was the final piece of art. The artists dedicated their brainchild to Marcel Duchamp, who exhibited a urinal as an art object, and Joseph Beuys, who declared that everyone is an artist. Later it was reported that the "stalactite" was prepared by the artists themselves, a few days before the opening of the exhibition, pouring lightly brewed tea on a specially fixed wooden pin.

== Special projects and guests ==
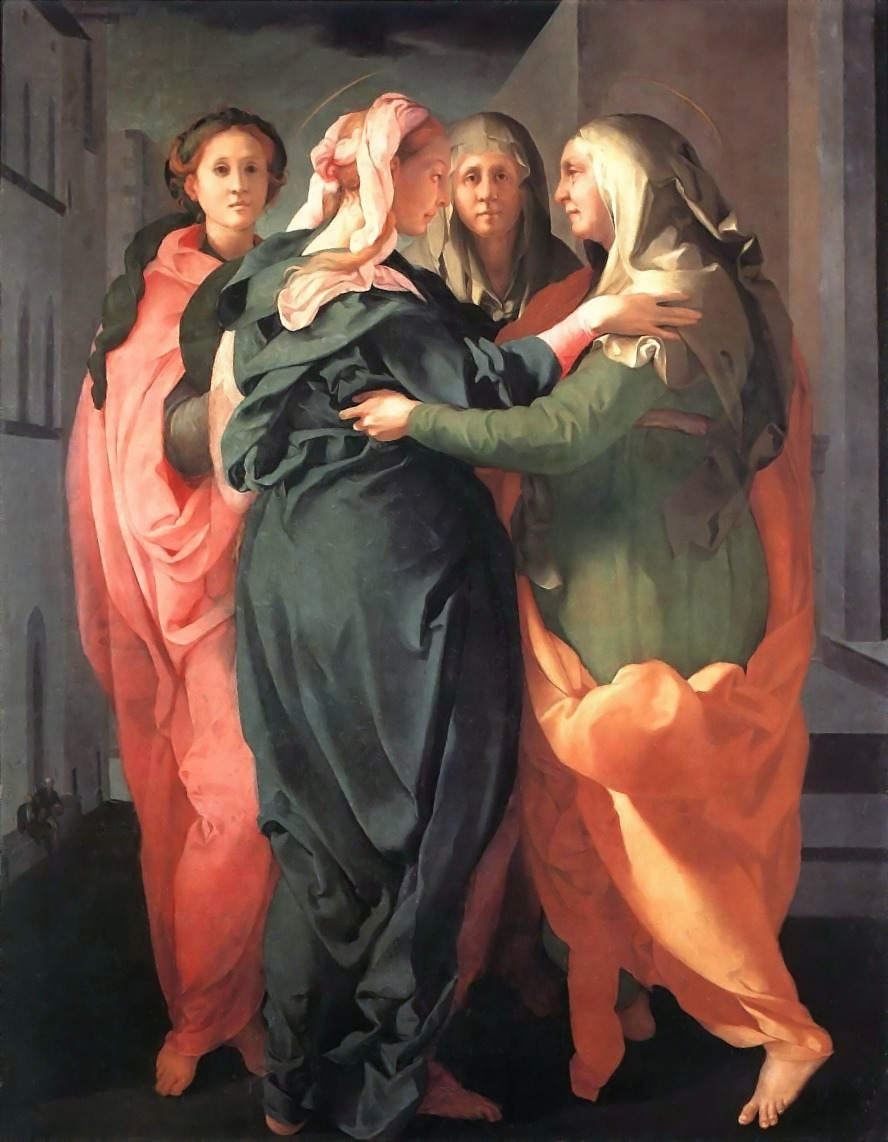
Painting "Meeting of Mary and Elizabeth" by Pontormo (1529), which became the basis for the video installation "Greeting" by Bill Viola

More than 30 special projects were presented at the 1st Moscow Biennale of Contemporary Art. They were housed in the Pushkin Museum, the Tretyakov Gallery, the Central House of Artists, the Moscow Museum of Modern Art (MMMA) and the Museum Center of the Russian State University for the Humanities. The artists Christian Boltanski (France), Bill Viola (United States) and Ilya Kabakov (United States) were invited as special guests.

The classic of Moscow Conceptualism, Ilya Kabakov, who lives in the US, did not come to Moscow, but presented his famous work "16 pitches", created in 1984 and considered to be the first "total installation". The work was exhibited in the same place where it was first shown: in the former workshop of Ilya Kabakov, located in the attic of the house of the insurance company "Russia" at Sretensky Boulevard, 6/1.

Christian Boltanski's work "The Ghosts of Odesa" was housed in two wings of the Museum of Architecture.

American artist Bill Viola presented his video installation "Greetings" in a small hall of the Greek courtyard of the Pushkin State Museum of Fine Arts. The video installation "revived" Pontormo's painting "The Meeting of Mary and Elizabeth": three actresses portraying the heroines of Pontormo's painting acted out a scene of the meeting [34]. The ultra-high-definition video was played back in slow motion and instead of the prescribed minute lasted about ten minutes, so that viewers could capture the smallest nuances in the change in the characters' facial expressions. The exposition was opened by the director of the museum, Irina Antonova, in whose opinion "Greeting" became the best work of the Biennale.

== Parallel program ==
For the parallel program, more than 200 artists and art groups were selected - participants in most of the significant exhibitions of contemporary art in Moscow that took place during the Biennale. Many artists, galleries and curators with various projects participated in two programs at once - main / special and parallel.

Among the most eminent participants in the parallel program of the 1st Moscow Biennale: Ilya and Emilia Kabakov, Ukrainian photographer Boris Mikhailov, Vladislav Efimov, Aristarkh Chernyshev, Anatoly Osmolovsky, Lyudmila Gorlova, George Pusenkoff, Boris Matrosov, Maxim Kantor, necrorelist Yevgeny Yufit, Rostan Tavasiev, Slava Mogutin, Anna Broche, Alexey Zverolovlev, Dmitry Shorin, Nikolay Nasedkin, Alexander Gnilitsky, Ananta Dasa and others. Also, the list of the parallel program of the biennale included non-personal exhibitions and entire festivals, for example, the 2nd international festival of digital art Art Digital-2004 with the central project of Konstantin Khudyakov and Viktor Bondarenko Deisis / Anthropology.

== Results ==
The main result of the 1st Moscow Biennale of Contemporary Art, according to many commentators, was the confident statement of Russia about itself in the world art community.

The Biennale was attended by about 200 thousand people, and 600 publications dedicated to this event were published in the Russian and world press. Among the shortcomings were named: the transfer of the main site of the forum "at the last moment", the lack of discussions, lectures, direct communication between spectators and artists.

Based on the results of the show, it was concluded that the idea of the Moscow Biennale had proved its viability, and immediately after the event was closed, discussion and preparation for the 2nd Moscow Biennale of Contemporary Art started. These works were taken over by the curator-coordinator of the 1st Moscow Biennale, Joseph Backstein, who established the art fund-operator "Moscow Biennale" for these purposes and acted as the Commissioner of the Moscow Biennale until the abolition of this position in 2016.

We must make this decision that for our country the Moscow Biennale is no less important than the Moscow Film Festival, which was held for the 27th time, the Tchaikovsky Competition or the Chekhov Festival, and so on and so forth. Daniil Dondurey, editor-in-chief, Iskusstvo Kino
