= Alexey Orlovski =

Russian painter (born 1963)

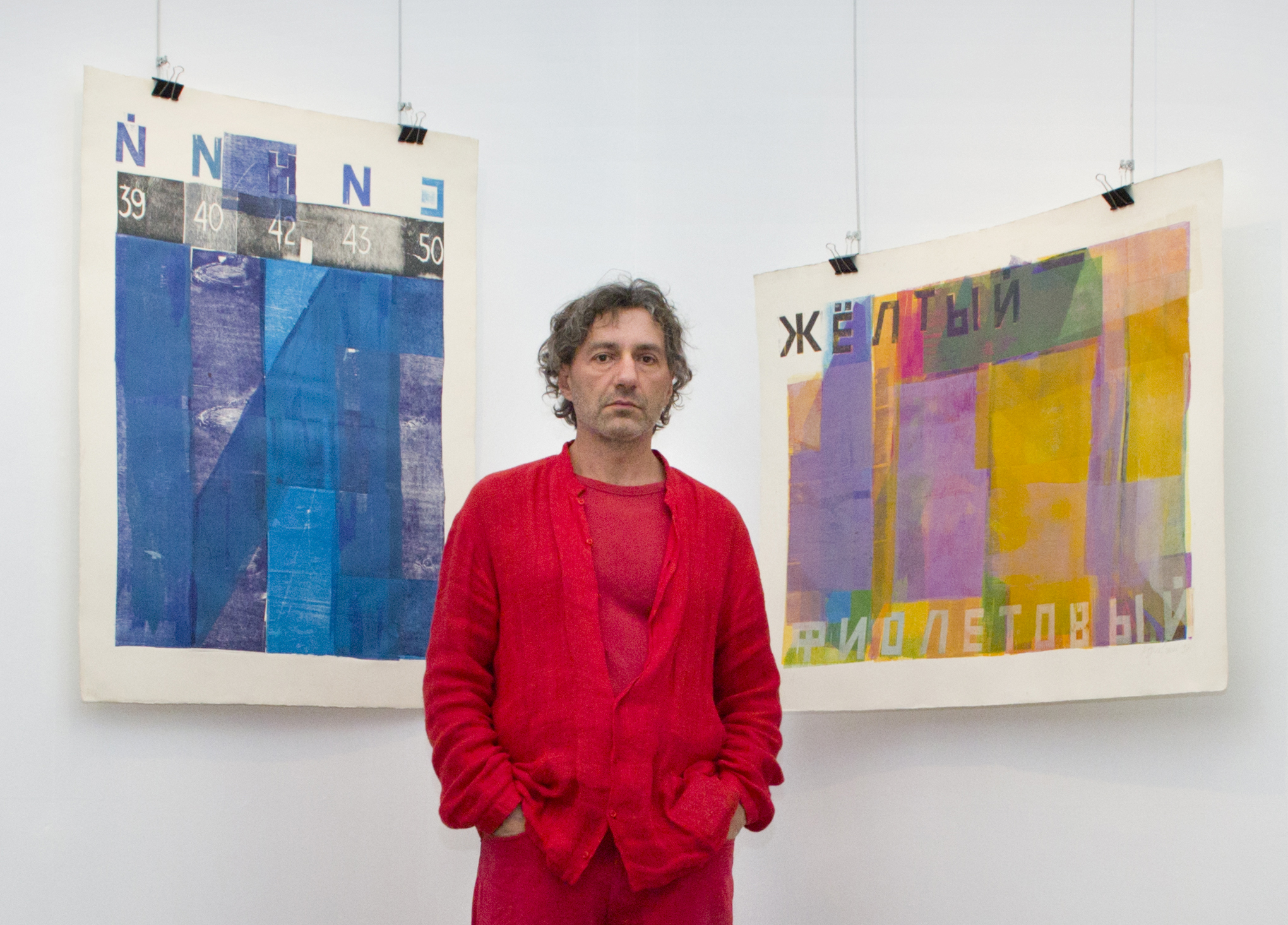
- Orlovsky in 2014
- Born: Alexey Borisovich Orlovski; 24 March 1963 (age 63); Moscow, Soviet Union
- Education: Moscow State University of Printing Arts
- Occupations: Painter, graphic artist, photographer, illustrator
- Title: Fellow of the Union of Artists of the USSR (1990–1991), Member of the Moscow Union of Artists (1993–present)

Alexey Borisovich Orlovski (born 24 March 1963) is a Russian painter, graphic artist, photographer and illustrator. He is fellow of the Union of Artists of the USSR (1990–1991). He is a member of the Moscow Union of Artists (1993–present).

== Biography ==
Alexey Orlovski was born on 24 March 1963 in Moscow. Between 1982 and 1988, he attended Dmitry Bisti's course at the Moscow Polygraphic Institute.

From 1981 to 1988, he worked as typographer (etching, engraving, lithography) at the "Cheliuskinskaya's" House of Creativity. In an interview, the artist said: "At a certain moment of my career at "Cheliuskinskaya", I felt that the stage of formation turns into an independent creation. The acquaintanceship with such great painters as Iulyi Perevezentsev and Valeryi Orlov contributed to this. I learned from Perevezentsev the freedom of thinking and from Orlov the freedom of work in the matter".

From 1988 to 1991, he worked in the teams of teenagers from the House of Creativity "Senej" of the Artists' Union of the USSR, where he wrked in lithography and screen printing (in 1988 he made the first silk-screening) From 1989, he participated in the exhibitions in Germany as a member of the "5+1" group.

In 1993, he came back to the "Cheliuskinskaya" House of Creativity, already as a painter, and worked there for 6 months in the lithography workroom. From 1990 to 2001, Alexey Orlovski worked in Germany, in Heidenheim an der Brenz at the printing workroom Schnitzer Design, where he made a series of screen prints. In 1994, in Denmark, in Odense, the joint graphic exhibition "Seasons" took place with Valery Orlov, Pavlo Makov, and Leonid Tishkov.

In 2002, he participated in Sotheby's auction the "International Young Art".

From 2002 to 2003, in the printing workroom "U&M Marat Gelman", Orlovski finished a series of printed pages by using two techniques – engraving on plywood and silk-screening. Starting in 2001, the artist was teaching at the School of Modern Art at the National Institute of Design. In 2007, in M-Gallery in Kharkiv, a retrospective exhibition of Alexey Orlovski was held – "20 years of work. Printed graphics" (1987–2006).

From 2001 to 2008, Alexey Orlovski collaborated with a children's publishing house "August", created illustrations for books: "Travkin's adventures" by S. Rozanov, "Russian poets for children and grown-ups" by A.I. Konyashov, "Turk's plaints" by Rozenshtorm. In 2008, the exhibition-presentation of "Turk's plaints" took place in the Zverev Center for Contemporary Art, where Alexey Orlovski demonstrated an array of works from 1987 to 2007, a few of which were used in the book.

Between 2009 and 2001, the artist was engaged in lithography in the workroom on Nizhnyaya Maslovka.

In 2014, he worked on a monumental painting of the facades of a private house in Alupka, Crimea.

The works of Alexey Orlovski are parts of the collections of State Tretyakov Gallery, The Pushkin Museum of Fine Arts, State Galleries of Ekaterinburg, Kurgan, Tyumen, The Nizhny Tagil Museum of Fine Arts, NCCA of Vladikavkaz as well as of private collections.

== Publications ==
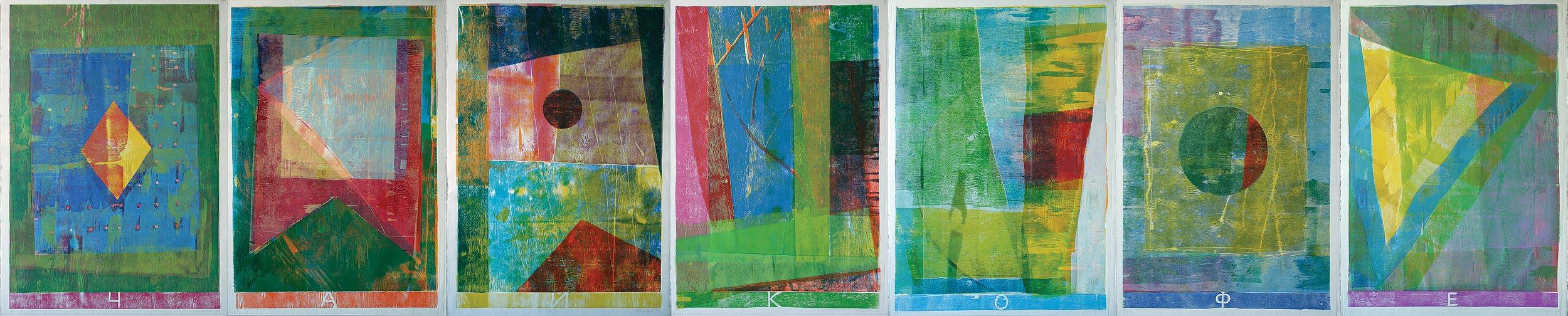
TEACOFFEE. Woodcut. 100х490 (1997)

"Alexey Orlovski works with various techniques. Makes gravures on plywood and with dry needle, silk-screenings, lithography; he is engaged in photography, writes picturesque paints. And with this set of plastic languages he tells in essence, one story, remaining surrounded by the same repetitive from the leaf to the list of landmark reference point". Galina Elshevskaya

"… he got his voice, his own theme in the polyphonic choir of modern art and started to speak as a Master, who can point and solve overarching objectives in creation and in life". A.Rider

"The artist creates bold collages, juxtaposing the blurred imagery of old photographs with the stamped precision of tea packaging and Southern Night wine labels. Throughout these works one can trace the influence of Favorsky, the Expressionists, Jasper Johns, Rothko, and Rauschenberg, alongside Alexey Orlovsky’s own painterly achievements."

"The creative ingenuity of the current artist Alexei Orlovsky has no limits. He managed to work in all techniques known to art (including xylography, lithography and silkscreen printing), in addition he inventing several new ones. The master's creativity is truly popular"

"Alexei Orlovsky is extremely realistic: everything that he creates is familiar, self-experienced, felt by that to which his memory relentlessly returns, using different levels of fixation – from the documentary series to the colored image. In the cacophony of color and the large format of Orlovsky's works, the artist's picturesque temperament finds its expression, signifying the attitude toward life…".

"The typical Orlovsky is "summer", generously sprinkled with the brightest colors, sketched from the pieces of cotton blanket. This observation of crawling slowly during the day and changes in lighting. His lyrical hero is an idle eyewitness of his own tracks on the sand, an amateur of beautiful things – a teashop on Myasnitskaya, tea-striped tin boxes, round letters which the word "tea" is written with...". Ludmila Lunina

== Personal exhibitions ==
- 1991 "Krussparcasse" Gallery. Heidenheim an der Brenz, Germany
- 1993 1994 1996 2002 "Velta" Gallery. Moscow
- 1993 "Im griesbad" Gallery. Ulm, Germany
- 1994 1996 "Gangway" Gallery. Heidenheim an der Brenz, Germany
- 2000 2003 Zverev Center for Contemporary Art. Moscow
- 2001 "MARS" Gallery. Moscow
- 2002 Art Museum. Nizhny Tagil
- 2004 "Manej" Gallery. Moscow
- 2007 M-Gallery. Kharkiv, Ukraine
- 2007 Russian gallery. Together with Ekaterina Rojkova. Tallinn, Estonia
- 2014 "Cultproject" Gallery. Together with Oleg Kudryashov and Yurii Shtapakov. Moscow
- 2015 Tyumen State Picture Gallery. Together with Alexey Bachiurin and Konstantin Shohov. Tyumen
- 2015 "Subsidiary of the State Khanty-Mansiysk Art Museum" "Workroom gallery of the artist GS Rayshov". Together with Alexey Bachurin and Konstantin Shohov.

== Selected exhibitions ==
- 1986 XVII th youth exhibition
- 1987 All-Union Youth Exhibition. Moscow
- 1987 1st Moscow auction. Moscow
- 1988 Triennial graphics. Nuremberg, Germany
- 1988 XVIII youth exhibition. Moscow
- 1989 Graphic exhibition "66 graphs". Central House of Artists, Moscow
- 1989 "5 + 1". Munich, Cologne, Bonn, Aachen, Kassel, Germany
- 1989 "MARS" Gallery, Moscow
- 1989 Graphics of Moscow artists. Central House of Artists, Moscow
- 1990 Triennial graphics. Frechen, Germany
- 1992 "Letter to Bulgakov." Central House of Artists, Moscow
- 1992 "4 Russian artists". "Alten Kloster" Cologne, Germany
- 1993 Graphic exhibition. Central House of Artists, Moscow
- 1993 "An irrelevant tradition in Russian art." Ankara, Turkey
- 1994 1996 1998 2000 2002 Biennale of graphics. Kaliningrad, Russia
- 1994 "Seasons". Odense, Denmark
- 1998 Biennale of Graphics, Prague, Czech Republic
- 1999 "Living nature." Yekaterinburg, Russia
- 1999 "Ural, Tibet ...". Moscow
- 2001 Triennial graphics. Tallinn, Estonia
- 2002 Artlink International Young Art. Artlink, Sotheby's.
- 2004 The Eurographics. Moscow. Bridge integration of European culture, triennial of graphics. Kraków, Poland
- 2007 "Nefertiti. Practice yourself ", Project Factory. Moscow
- 2008 "Translation of paper", 2009 "Bathers", Zverev Center for Contemporary Art. Moscow
- 2015 Gallery "A3" "Manifestation of artists". Moscow
- 2016 KIM BO SUNG / ART CENTER. Dialogue: Contemporary Art from Russia. Seoul, South Korea

== Honors and awards ==
- II prize in the section "Graphics" XVIII youth exhibition. Moscow, 1988.
- II Prize of the Biennale of Graphics. Kaliningrad, Russia, 1994.
- Winner of the V International biennial of easel graphics. Kaliningrad, Russia, 1996.
