= Matrosov =

Matrosov (masculine), Matrosova (feminine) is a Russian-language surname derived from the term matros, "seaman". Notable people with the surname include:

- Alexander Matrosov
- Anastasiia Matrosova
- Boris Matrosov
- Denis Matrosov
- Irina Matrosova
- Marina Matrosova

== See also ==
- 17354 Matrosov, minor planet
