= ArtChronika =

Former Russian contemporary art magazine

- Editor: Maria Rogulyova (2011-2013)
- Former editors: Milena Orlova (2009-2011), Nikolay Molok (2002-2009), Evgeny Zyablov (1999-2001)
- Categories: Arts
- Circulation: 10 000 - 40 000
- Publisher: Evgeny Zyablov (1999-2005), Alexander Sysoenko (2000-2005), Shalva Breus (2005-2013)
- Founder: Evgeny Zyablov
- Founded: 1999
- First issue: May 1999
- Company: OOO "ArtChronika" (2000-2001), ЗАО "ArtChronika" (2002-2005), OOO "Art-Media" (2006-2013)
- Country: Russia
- Based in: Moscow
- Language: Russian, English
- Website: www.artchronika.ru
- ISSN: 1607-3983

ArtChronika (Russian: Артхроника) — was a Russian magazine about contemporary art, published from 1999 to 2013. It was one of the most influential Russian periodicals on this subject.

== History ==
=== 1998—2001 ===
In September 1998, the Moscow Collection Gallery, owned by Evgeny Zyablov, registered a periodical illustrated magazine about art - Moscow Collection (Russian: Московское собрание). In June 1999, the "zero" issue of this magazine was presented with the changed title ART Moscow Collection (Russian: ART Московское собрание) and with the subtitle “Chronicle of Artistic Life” (Russian: Хроника художественной жизни) (No. 0, May 1999).

Evgeny Zyablov became the editor-in-chief, Evgeny Raitses became the art director, the declared circulation was 10 thousand copies. The issue included an article by Irina Vakar about Kazimir Malevich and Ivan Kliun, and on the cover was a photo of Zyablov's daughter, for which the editor-in-chief was criticized. For some time the concept of the journal was refined and since 2000 it has been published regularly. For its release, ООО "ArtChronika" was formed.

In 2000, Alexander Sysoenko joined Zyablov as a co-publisher, and in 2000-2001 the magazine was issued every 2 months, under the title "ART CHRONIKA" (in Latin script) in a bilingual format (Russian and English versions under one cover). The chief editor was still Zyablov (under the pseudonym Evgeny Maksimov), who in May 2001 was appointed director of ROSIZO. A feature of each issue of the magazine in 2001 was an addition to the main circulation - a limited edition of 100 to 300 numbered copies, contained a signed original of a work by the artist, who became the next hero of the new magazine heading named "Project".

Each project is a complete action with all the attributes, including comments from the authors and explanations from critics. It is being prepared specifically for the magazine and has nothing to do with the material about the artist or the documentation of a previously carried out curatorial project.

— ART CHRONIKA, No. 1, May 2001

The artists of the project are Igor Makarevich (No. 1, 2001), Ivan Lubennikov (No. 2, 2001), Vladislav Mamyshev-Monroe (No. 3, 2001) and Eduard Gorokhovsky (No. 4-5, 2001).

=== 2002—2005 ===
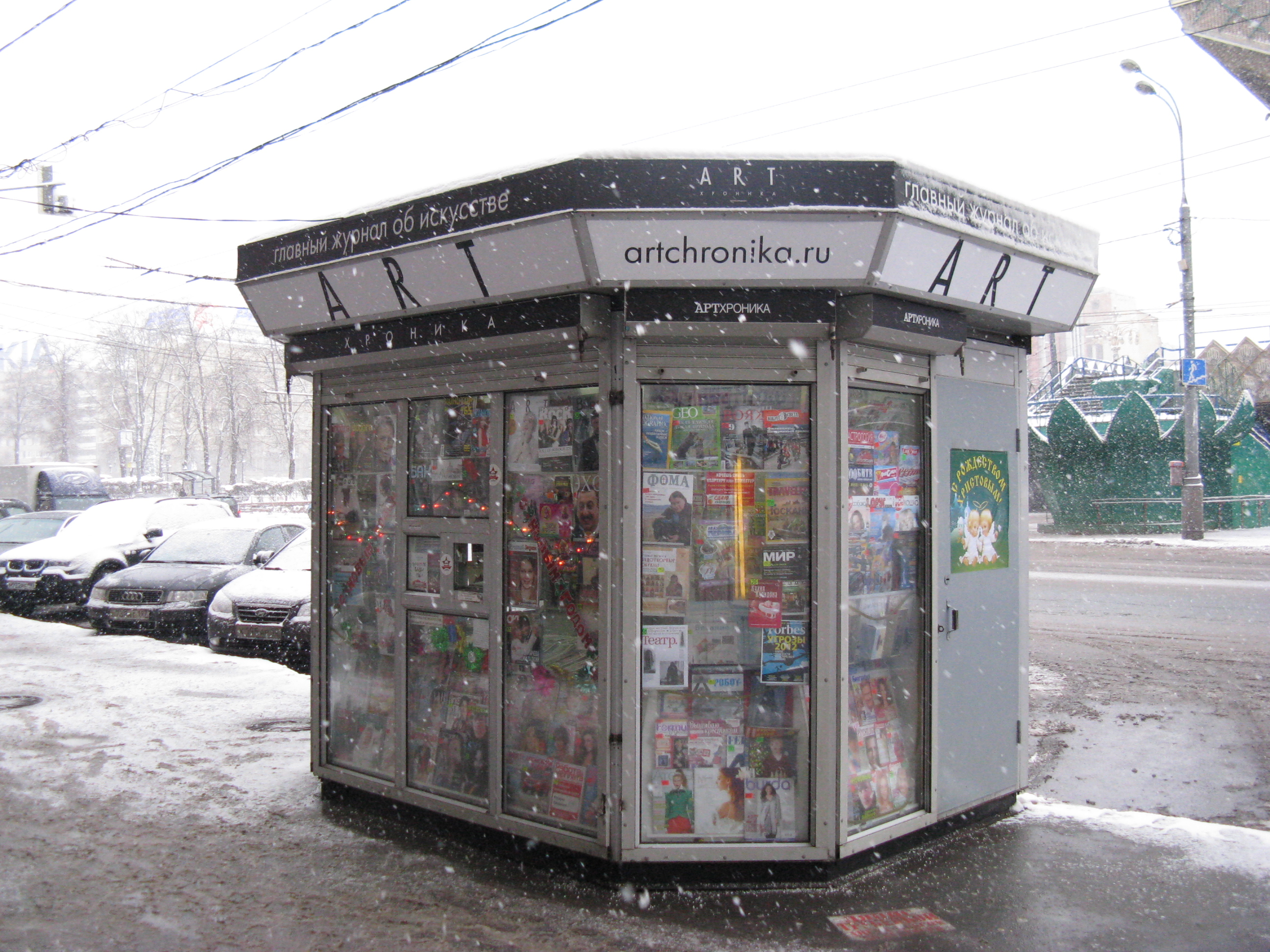
Kiosk "Artchronika" on Pushkinskaya Square in Moscow, January 2012

At the beginning of 2002, ООО "ArtChronika" was transformed into Art Chronicle ЗАО "ArtChronika", where Vyacheslav Terpugov was appointed director. Since then, the ArtChronika magazine has been published only in Russian with a summary of articles in English at the end of each issue. The title of the magazine on the cover is written in Russian - "АртХроника". The editorial board of the magazine was created, consisting of: Iosif Bakshtein, Evgeny Zyablov, Victor Misiano, Nikolay Molok, Alexander Sysoenko. Nikolay Molok was appointed editor-in-chief. During this period, the magazine was carried out with the support of the Ministry of Culture of Russia and it a joint project of ЗАО "ArtChronika" and the State Exhibition Center ROSIZO.

In 2003, the JamilCo company became a shareholder of ЗАО "ArtChronika". The main project of the final (No. 6) issue of the magazine in 2004 was the rating “Top 30 of most influential persons in Russian art”. This rating has become so popular in the Russian art community that it was published annually (Top-50) since 2006 till the termination of the magazine. And even after that, the editors of another Russian art-magazine, ArtGuide, picked up and continued this project.

Issue No. 1 of ArtChronika magazine for 2005 is entirely devoted to the 1st Moscow Biennale of Contemporary Art, and is the only complete printed source - a reference book that lists the names of everyone who participated in the main project, each special project and each project of the parallel program of this biennale. This issue was released in two separate versions - in Russian and in English.

In No. 5-6 / 2005, Shalva Breus and Evgeny Zyablov are listed as publishers of the magazine for the first time. During the preparation for issue No. 5-6 / 2005, an experiment was carried out to cover two antagonistic segments of the art markets - contemporary art and antiques: the issue was released with two different covers ("Artchronika (contemporary)" and "Artchronika Antique"); within the magazine, 70% of the volume covered, as usual, the most important events in art, regardless of belonging to old or new art, and 30% of the pages - the main topic - were devoted, respectively, to contemporary art or to the antique market. At the turn of 2005–2006, ЗАО "ArtChronika" sold the rights to the magazine ArtChronika to OOO "Art-Media", owned by Shalva Breus. The amount of the deal was not disclosed.

=== 2006—2013 ===
From 2006 until the closure of the magazine, its publisher was entrepreneur and the Deputy Minister of Property Relations of Russia Shalva Breus. Until 2011, the magazine was published monthly, later - with a complicated periodicity of six issues per year (one in winter and summer and two in spring and autumn). The declared circulation of the magazine in 2011-2013 was 40,000 copies.

In August 2013, it became known about the closure of ArtChronika. A year and a half earlier, the magazine had grown, but its release slowed down from ten to six issues per year, and publishers abandoned English-language issues. Breus Foundation (in 2006–2013, this foundation was called "ArtChronika" too) switched to the creation of the Udarnik Museum of Contemporary Art, as well as to the publication of monographs by Russian artists.

== Staff ==
chief editors

- 1999 - 2001 - Evgeny Zyablov
- 2002 - 2009 - Nikolay Molok,
- 2009 - 2011 - Milena Orlova,
- 2011 - 2013 - Maria Rogulyova.

From 2007 to 2011 Andrey Shelyutto was the art director of the magazine.

From 2011 to 2013 Nika Dobina was an Art Director of the magazine.

Among the columnists in the magazine collaborated: Andrey Erofeev, Ilya Falkovsky, Arina Kholina, Irina Kulik, etc.
