= Alexander Shafransky =

- Born: 1946
- Died: 2017 (aged 70–71)
- Known for: Graphics, Painting

Alexander Stepanovich Shafransky (Russian: Александр Степанович Шафранский; 8 January 1946 – 9 January 2017) was a Soviet and Russian graphic artist, painter, and designer. He was a member of the Creative Union of Artists of Russia.

== Early life and education ==
Alexander Shafransky was born in Moscow on January 8, 1946, into the family of a military construction engineer. He spent his childhood near the Sheremetev Estate, which he cited as an early source of aesthetic inspiration. His interest in art was further encouraged by his older brother, Gennady, who was an amateur artist.

Shafransky attended the Moscow State Historico-Archival Institute, graduating in 1970. While studying at the institute, he began formal artistic training at the ZIL Palace of Culture art studio, where he studied for two years under Alexei Kulakov. He continued his artistic education in various studios from 1963 to 1968, studying under A.E. Sukhinin.

Seeking professional qualification, he enrolled at the Moscow Polygraphic Institute (now the Moscow State University of Printing Arts), where he graduated in 1978. During his time there, he studied under prominent Soviet artists including P.G. Zakharov, V.M. Basov, and Dmitry Zhilinsky.

== Career ==
Shafransky began his professional career in 1976, prior to his graduation from the Polygraphic Institute. He established himself as a book illustrator, collaborating with several major Soviet publishing houses such as Molodaya Gvardiya, Znanie, Planeta, and Progress.

In 1976, he participated in a youth exhibition of the Moscow Union of Artists (MOSKh), where his etching works, specifically in the mezzotint technique, received praise from noted graphic artists D. Bisti and I. Golitsyn.

He became a member of the International Federation of Artists in 1992 and the Union of Artists of Russia in 1999. Throughout his career, Shafransky participated in approximately 100 exhibitions, including solo exhibitions in Moscow.

== Death ==
Alexander Shafransky committed suicide in Moscow on January 9, 2017, at the age of 71.
