= Evgeny Zyablov =

Russian curator and entrepreneur

Evgeny Maksimovich Zyablov
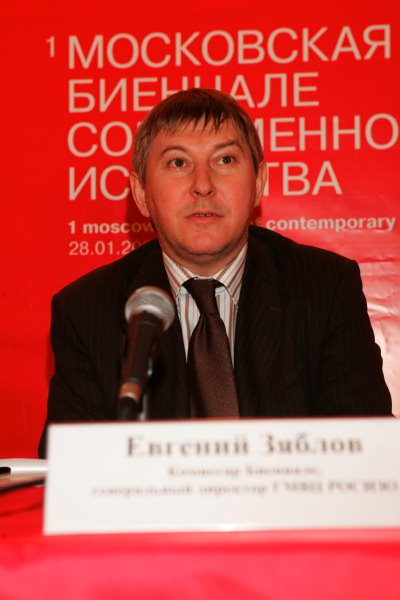
- Born: June 27, 1960 (age 64)
- Occupation(s): publisher, manager, curator, entrepreneur
- Years active: 1999-present
- Known for: founding and publishing ArtChronika magazine, heading ROSIZO, founding Moscow Biennale of Contemporary Art

Evgeny Maksimovich Zyablov (Russian: Евге́ний Макси́мович Зя́блов, born 27 June 1960, Tashkent) is a Russian curator, manager, art publisher and entrepreneur, internationally renowned as Commissioner of the 1 Moscow Biennale of Contemporary Art (2005). Zyablov also was the Commissioner of the Russian pavilion at the 50th and 51st Venice Biennale of Contemporary Art (2003, 2005), and at the 9th and 10th Venice Biennale of Architecture (2004, 2006) as well.

Zyablov was a founder, publisher (1999-2006, together with Alexander Sysoenko in 2000–2005) and editor-in-chief (1999-2001) of one of the leading Russian art publications, the ArtChronika magazine; founder, publisher and art director of the ArtGuide magazine (2005).

From 2001 to 2007, Evgeny Zyablov was the Director of the State Museum and Exhibition Center ROSIZO.

== Biography ==
Evgeny Zyablov was born in 1960 in Tashkent (Uzbek SSR) into a family of engineers from Taganrog. His father - Maxim Pavlovich Zyablov, mother - Nelly Vladimirovna Zyablova (Lomakina). After serving military service in the Soviet Army, Evgeny trained as a geologist at the Rostov State University, and then, as an architect at the Rostov Civil Engineering Institute. He worked in geological expeditions, as a designer and furniture design engineer.

Zyablov is a Graduate Gemologist (G.G.) of the Gemological Institute of America. He studied economics and audit in absentia, defended his thesis for the degree of Candidate of Economic Sciences (PhD) at the Moscow Higher School of Privatization and Entrepreneurship (HSPP).

He has participated in various private and public projects in the fields of art, protection of cultural heritage and investment. Co-founder (in 2003, together with Denis Lukashin) of the first Russian non-state technological laboratory for complex examination of painting "Art Consulting". He is a patent holder for a method for determining the age of oil paintings.

Over the years, Evgeny Zyablov worked in government positions, in particular, he was the head of the Investment Department of the Moscow Property Fund (1995-1996), the Deputy Chairman of the Committee for Municipal Loans and Stock Market Development in Moscow (Moskomzaim) (1997-1999), the Director of ROSIZO (2001-2007).

From 2009 to 2011, he managed investments in the field of cultural heritage at CJSC Leader (pension fund asset management company). In 2014–2015, he was the developer and scientific supervisor of the professional retraining program “Art Market and Investments in Art and Jewelry” at the Financial University under the Government of the Russian Federation.

== Publishing projects ==
=== ArtChronika ===
In September 1998, the Moscow Collection Gallery, owned by Evgeny Zyablov, registered a periodical illustrated publication about art named Moscow Collection. In June 1999, the "zero" May issue of this magazine was presented under the title ART Moscow Collection and with the subtitle "Chronicle of Artistic Life". Evgeny Raitses joined the project as art director, while Zyablov retained the functions of editor-in-chief. A photo of Zyablov's daughter was placed on the cover of the issue, for which the founder of the magazine was criticized. Since 2000, the magazine ArtChronika has been published regularly, every two months.

To issue the magazine, Evgeny Zyablov created ArtChronika LLC, and in 2000 Alexander Sysoenko joined him as a co-publisher. Zyablov continued to lead the publication for some time, but hid under the pseudonym "Evgeny Maksimov". In May 2001, Zyablov was appointed to the post of Director of ROSIZO, and since 2002, Nikolay Molok has replaced him in the chair of the editor-in-chief. The appointment of Zyablov opened new prospects for ArtChronika: the magazine began to enjoy the support of the Ministry of Culture and became a joint project of the reorganized ArtChronika CJSC and ROSIZO.

Starting in 1999 with a declared circulation of 10 thousand copies, Artchronika quickly gained a reputation as one of the leading Russian publications on the topic of contemporary art, and at the peak of its success it was published with a circulation of 40 thousand copies. Probably the most successful initiative of the Artchronika editorial staff was the rating “Top 30 of most influential persons in Russian art” based on the results of 2004, which has been published annually (in an expanded to the "Top 50" version) since 2006.

At the turn of 2005–2006, Evgeny Zyablov sold the publishing rights to Shalva Breus for an unnamed amount and didn't take part in ArtChronika anymore. In 2013, the magazine was closed.

=== ArtGuide ===
Artguide (full name - Artguide Moscow) was Evgeny Zyablov's second publishing project. It was a periodical illustrated pocket-size guide about current and upcoming events in Moscow art life. It was a "flip-flop": on the one hand, the cover and texts in Russian, on the opposite side - the cover and texts in English. The first issue of Artguide was released in March 2005 with a declared circulation of 40 thousand copies. Zyablov again combined several functions: the author and ideologist of the project, as well as the publisher, but this time the chief editor was originally Nikolai Molok. Apart from him, the editorial board included eminent specialists, and the project itself was carried out with the support of Natural Le Coultre (the family company of Yves Bouvier), as well as Le Petit Futé and E.K ArtBureau. However, already in 2006, the publication of Artguide, for unnamed reasons, was stopped.

In 2009, a former employee of the Artguide editorial board Danila Stratovich, after agreeing with Zyablov, resumed the release of Artguide, indicating in the imprint of the printed version "Founded in 2005 by Evgeny Zyablov". Currently Artguide exists only as a website and a mobile application.

=== Guidance on inventory and documentation of the cultural heritage ===
The print edition of Guidance on inventory and documentation of the cultural heritage has been prepared by the ad hoc accounting and documentation group under the Cultural Heritage Cooperation and Technical Assistance Program. It was published by the Council of Europe in 2001. The Russian edition produced by Art Consulting in February 2008 (ISBN 978-5-903892-02-0). The head of the Russian edition was Evgeny Zyablov.

== Exhibition projects ==
Over the years of his work as the director of ROSIZO, Evgeny Zyablov has repeatedly organized both separate exhibition programs at major international forums, and these forums themselves. Already in 2002, at the 25th Bienal de Arte São Paulo, he acted as the Commissioner of the Russian exhibition project (artist Sergei Bratkov, curator Iosif Backstein).

Twice Evgeny Zyablov acted as Commissioner of the Russian pavilion at the Venice Biennale of Contemporary Art (2003, 2005), and also twice - at the Venice Biennale of Architecture (2004, 2006).

At the Festival "Europalia-Russia" (October 2005 - February 2006) ROSIZO under the leadership of Evgeny Zyablov presented a program (the head of the exhibition program was Alexander Sysoenko) of 18 art exhibitions, with the participation of 48 Russian museums.

=== 1 Moscow Biennale of Contemporary Art ===
Since the second half of the 1990s, the idea of creating a large Russian art forum comparable to the world's largest biennials has been in the air. This idea was supported by the Ministry of Culture and, after the adoption of the Federal Target Program "Culture of Russia. 2001-2005", began to take real shape. Preparation for such a large-scale event was accompanied by great anticipation, enthusiasm and widespread public debate, in which the initiative was called "The Big Project for Russia" (Russian: Большой проект для России).

On January 30–31, 2003 the State Museum and Exhibition Center ROSIZO, then headed by Evgeny Zyablov, held a symposium in Moscow "The Big Project for Russia. Problems and prospects". The most famous curators of the world became its participants: Francesco Bonami, Germano Celant (both Italy), Harald Szeemann, Hans Ulrich Obrist (both Switzerland), René Block (Germany), Robert Storr (United States).

In the same year, the Moscow Biennale of Contemporary Art was established by the Ministry of Culture. The Federal Agency for Culture and Cinematography and ROSIZO also became its organizers. The chairman of the organizing committee was the Minister of Culture Mikhail Shvydkoy. Evgeny Zyablov, who became the Commissioner of the 1st Moscow Biennale, Iosif Bakshtein, who acted as the curator-coordinator, and Victor Misiano, who left the curatorial group before the opening of the forum, were directly involved in the preparation and conduct of the event. The 1 Moscow Biennale of Contemporary Art held in January–February 2005.

The Moscow Biennale has become the largest periodical cultural event in the Russian capital. In total, 41 young artists from 22 countries took part in the main program of the festival. Starting from the very first biennale, the parallel program began to include practically all Moscow exhibitions of contemporary art, which coincided in time, including exhibitions in private galleries.
