= Russian pavilion =

Venice Biennale national pavilion

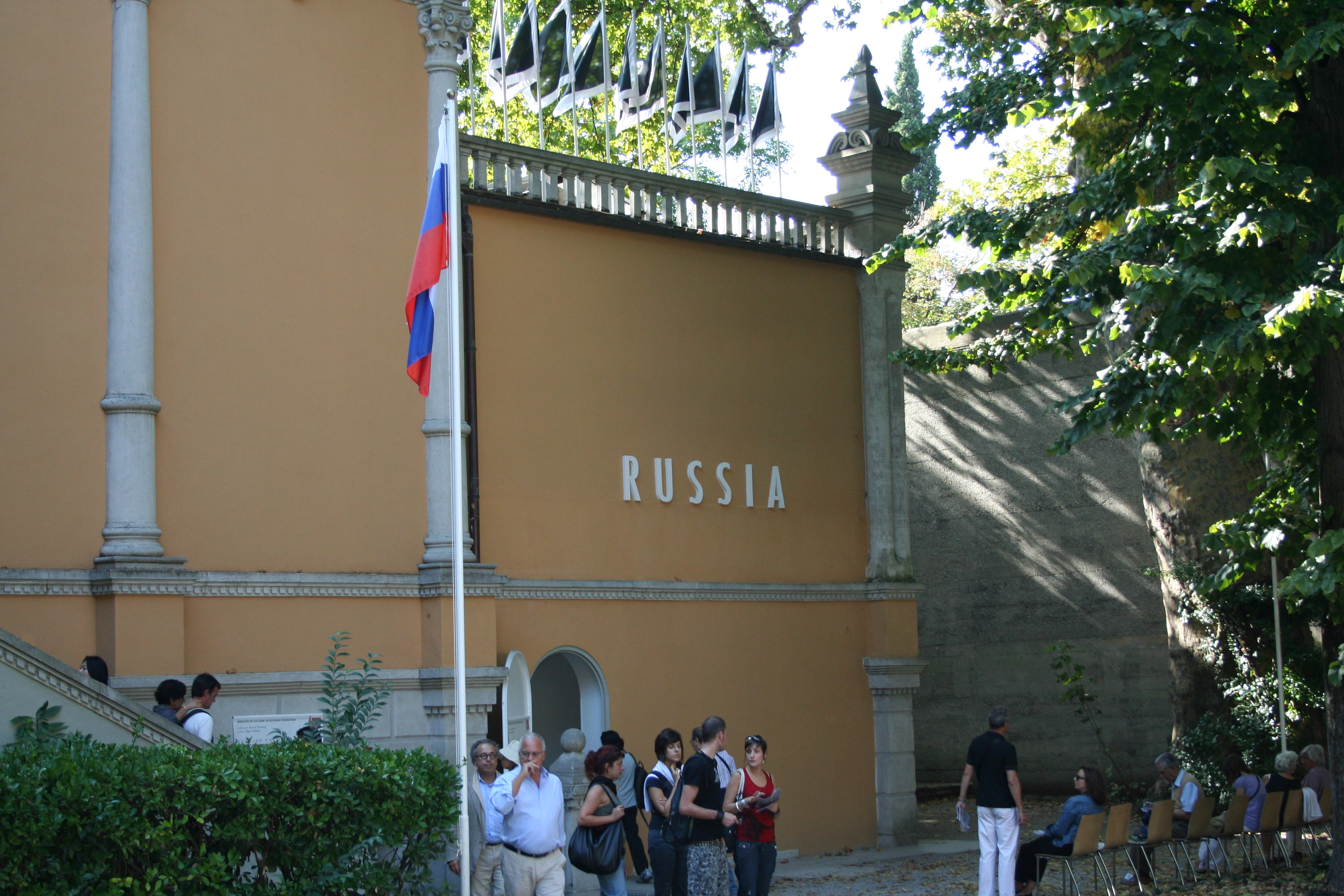
Russia pavilion Biennale Giardini art 2009

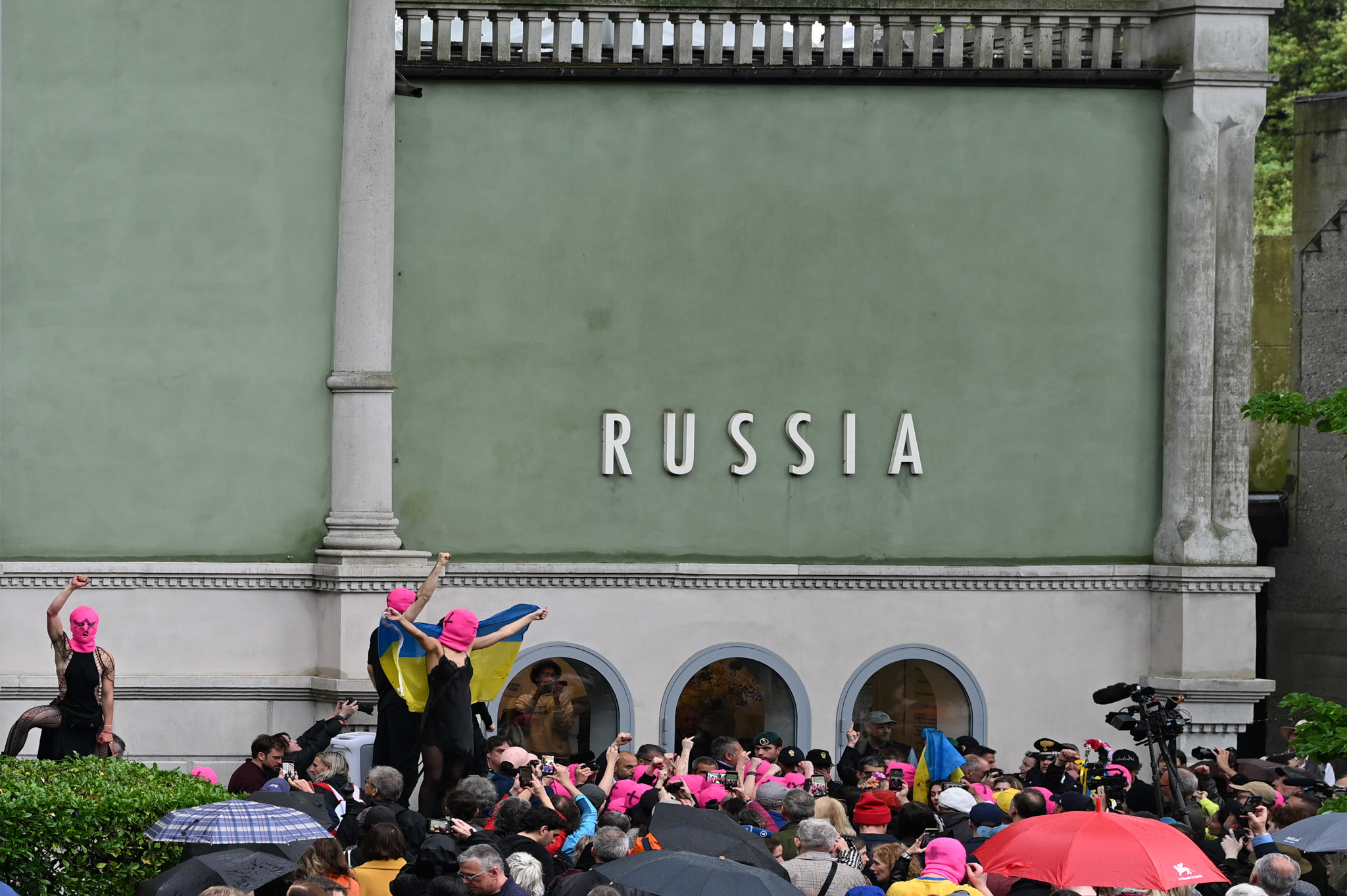
Pussy Riot & Femen protest at the Biennale di Venezia 2026

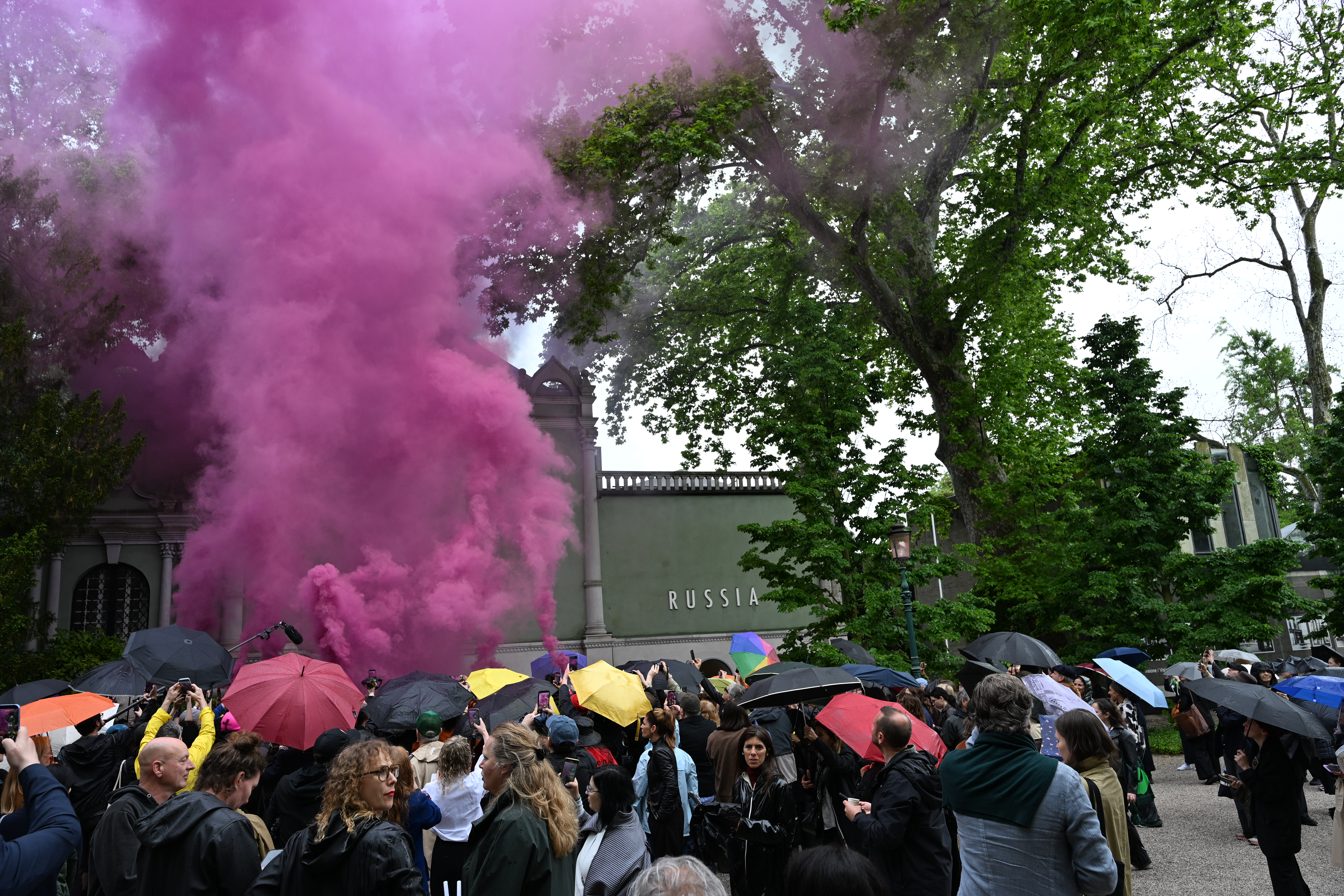
Pussy Riot & Femen protest at the Biennale di Venezia 2026

The Russian Pavilion accommodates the national representation of Russia during the Venice Biennale arts festivals.

== Background ==
The Venice Biennale is an international art biennial exhibition held in Venice, Italy. Often described as "the Olympics of the art world", participation in the Biennale is a prestigious event for contemporary artists. The festival has become a constellation of shows: a central exhibition curated by that year's artistic director, national pavilions hosted by individual nations, and independent exhibitions held throughout Venice. The Biennale's parent organisation also runs regular festivals in other arts: architecture, dance, film, music and theatre.

Outside the central international exhibition, individual nations produce their own shows, known as pavilions, as their national representation. Nations that own their pavilion buildings – such as the 30 housed in the Giardini – are responsible for their own upkeep and construction costs as well. Nations without dedicated buildings create pavilions in venues throughout the city.

== Organization and building ==
The Russian Pavilion was designed and erected between 1913 and 1914. Its architect, Alexey Shchusev, drew upon motifs from the Russian architecture of the seventeenth and eighteenth centuries.

The Russian Pavilion was closed in 1922, from 1938 to 1954, and again between 1978 and 1980. In both 1926 and 1936, the Russian Pavilion played host to exhibitions of Italian Futurism curated by Filippo Tommaso Marinetti.

== Representation by year ==
=== Art ===
- 1914 — Group exhibition of 68 artists, including Léon Bakst, Isaak Brodsky, Mikhail Vrubel, Mstislav Dobuzhinsky, Boris Kustodiev
- 1920 — Group exhibition of 20 artists, including Aleksandr Arсhipenko, Marianne von Werefkin, Natalia Goncharova, Boris Grigoriev, Mikhail Larionov, Dmitry Stelletsky, Alexej von Jawlensky
- 1924 — Group exhibition of 97 artists, including Nathan Altman, Lev Bruni, Igor Grabar, Boris Kustodiev, Aristarkh Lentulov, Kazimir Malevich, Mikhail Matyushin, Ilya Mashkov, Kuzma Petrov-Vodkin, Lyubov Popova, Nadezhda Udaltsova, Robert Falk, Vasily Chekrygin, Sergei Chekhonin, David Shterenberg, Alexandra Ekster
- 1928 — Group exhibition of 72 artists, including Nathan Altman, Abram Arkhipov, Aleksandr Deineka, Petr Kontchalovsky, Elizaveta Kruglikova, Kuzma Petrov-Vodkin, Yuriy Pimenov, Robert Falk
- 1930 — Group exhibition of 47 artists, including Aleksandr Deineka, Aleksandr Labas, Aristarkh Lentulov, Yuriy Pimenov, David Schterenberg
- 1932 — Group exhibition of 49 artists, including Isaak Brodsky, Aleksandr Deineka, Petr Konchalovsky, Aleksandr Labas, Kuzma Petrov-Vodkin, Yuriy Pimenov, David Schterenberg
- 1934 — Group exhibition of 23 artists, including Isaak Brodsky, Aleksandr Deineka, Vera Mukhina, Kuzma Petrov-Vodkin
- 1956 — Group exhibition of 72 artists, including Igor Grabar, Aleksandr Deineka, Boris Ioganson, Petr Konchalovsky, Pavel Korin, Ilya Mashkov, Vera Mukhina, Georgy Nissky, Yuriy Pimenov, Nadezhda Udaltsova, Semen Chuikov, Kukryniksy
- 1958 — Group exhibition of 17 artists, including Evgeny Vuchetich, Sergej Gerasimov, Kukryniksy, Georgy Nissky, Yuriy Pimenov, Arkady Plastov
- 1960 — Group exhibition of 22 artists, including Aleksandr Deineka, Kukryniksy, Dmitry Moor, Vera Mukhina, Andrey Mylnikov, Georgy Nissky (Commissioner: Irina Antonova)
- 1962 — Group exhibition of 12 artists, including Mikhail Anikushin, Sergey Konenkov, Geliy Korzhev, Viktor Popkov, Tair Salakhov (Commissioner: Larissa Salmina)
- 1964 — Group exhibition of 42 artists, including Aleksandr Deineka, Pavel Korin, Evsey Moiseenko, Vladimir Stozharov, Evgeny Vuchetich
- 1966 — Group exhibition of 26 artists, including Vladimir Stozharov, Dmitry Zhilinsky, Misha Brusilovsky
- 1968 — Group exhibition of 15 artists, including Dmitry Bisti, Arkady Plastov, Yuri Vasnetsov
- 1970 — Nikolay Andreev, Aleksandr Deineka
- 1972 — Group exhibition of 31 artists, including Evsey Moiseenko, Kuzma Petrov-Vodkin, Nikolay Tomsky
- 1976 — Group exhibition of 45 artists, including Georgy Nissky, Yuriy Pimenov, Tair Salakhov, Vladimir Stozharov
- 1977 — Group exhibition of 99 artists in frames of Biennale of Dissident, including Erik Bulatov, Ilya Kabakov, Andrey Monastyrsky, Oskar Rabin, Oleg Vasiliev, Anatoly Zverev
- 1982 — Group exhibition of 32 artists, including Tatiana Nazarenko, Viktor Popkov, Dmitry Zhilinsky
- 1984 — Group exhibition of 6 artists, including Nikolay Akimov, Aleksandr Tyshler
- 1986 — Group exhibition of 23 artists, including Dmitry Bisti, Vladimir Favorsky
- 1988 — Aristarkh Lentulov
- 1990 — Group exhibition of 7 artists, including Evgeny Mitta, Robert Rauschenberg, Aidan Salakhova
- 1993 — Ilya Kabakov
- 1995 — Evgeny Asse, Dmitry Gutov, Vadim Fishkin (Commissioner: Victor Misiano)
- 1997 — Maksim Kantor (Commissioner: Konstantin Bokhorov; curator: Yury Nikich)
- 1999 — Sergey Bugaev (Afrika), Vitaly Komar & Aleksandr Melamid (Commissioner: Konstantin Bokhorov; curators: Olesya Turkina, Joseph Bakshtein)
- 2001 — Leonid Sokov, Olga Chernyshova, Sergey Shutov (Commissioner: Leonid Bazhanov; curator: Ekaterina Degot)
- 2003 — Sergey Bratkov, Aleksandr Vinogradov & Vladimir Dubossarsky, Konstantin Zvezdochetov, Valery Koshlyakov (Commissioner: Evgeny Zyablov; curator: Victor Misiano)
- 2005 — Provmyza group, Program 'Escape' (Commissioner: Evgeny Zyablov; curators: Olga Lopukhova, Lyubov Saprykina)
- 2007 — AES+F, Andrey Bartenev, Georgy Frangulian, Arseny Mescheryarov, Julia Milner, Alexandr Ponomarev (Commissioner: Vassily Tsereteli; curator: Olga Sviblova)
- 2009 — Alexei Kallima, Andrei Molodkine, Gosha Ostretsov, Anatoly Zhuravlev, Sergei Shekhovtsov, Irina Korina, Pavel Peppershtein (Commissioner: Vassily Tsereteli; curator: Olga Sviblova)
- 2011 — Andrey Monastyrsky and "Collective Actions" group (Elena Elagina, Sabina Hensgen, Igor Makarevich, Nikolai Pantikov, Sergei Romashko and others) (Commissioner: Stella Kesaeva; curator: Boris Groys)
- 2013 — Vadim Zakharov (Commissioner: Stella Kesaeva; curator: Udo Kittelmann)
- 2015 — Irina Nakhova (Commissioner: Stella Kesaeva; curator: Margarita Tupitsyn)
- 2017 — Grisha Bruskin, Sasha Pirogova (ru), Georgy Kuznetsov, Andrei Blokhin (Curator: Semyon Mikhailovsky)
- 2019 –
- 2022 – Did not participate (Russian invasion of Ukraine)
- 2024 – Did not participate
- 2026 – ca. 50 artists, (Curator: Anastasia Karneeva)

== Reopening and closure of the Russian Pavilion (2026) ==
In 2026, the Russian Pavilion briefly reopened after several years of inactivity occasioned by the Russian invasion of Ukraine. The decision prompted censure from artists, curators and cultural commentators, some of whom maintained that the move undermined both the Biennale's historical identity as an anti-fascist institution and the broader framework of cultural sanctions against Russia. Amid controversy and reports of institutional discord, the Pavilion was subsequently closed once more during the period of the exhibition.

== Bibliography ==
- Russeth, Andrew (April 17, 2019). "The Venice Biennale: Everything You Could Ever Want to Know". ARTnews.
- Volpi, Cristiana (2013). "Russia". In Re Rebaudengo, Adele (ed.). Pavilions and Garden of Venice Biennale. Rome: Contrasto. p. 170. ISBN 978-88-6965-440-4.
