= National Centre for Contemporary Arts =

Museum in Russia

- Государственный центр современного искусства
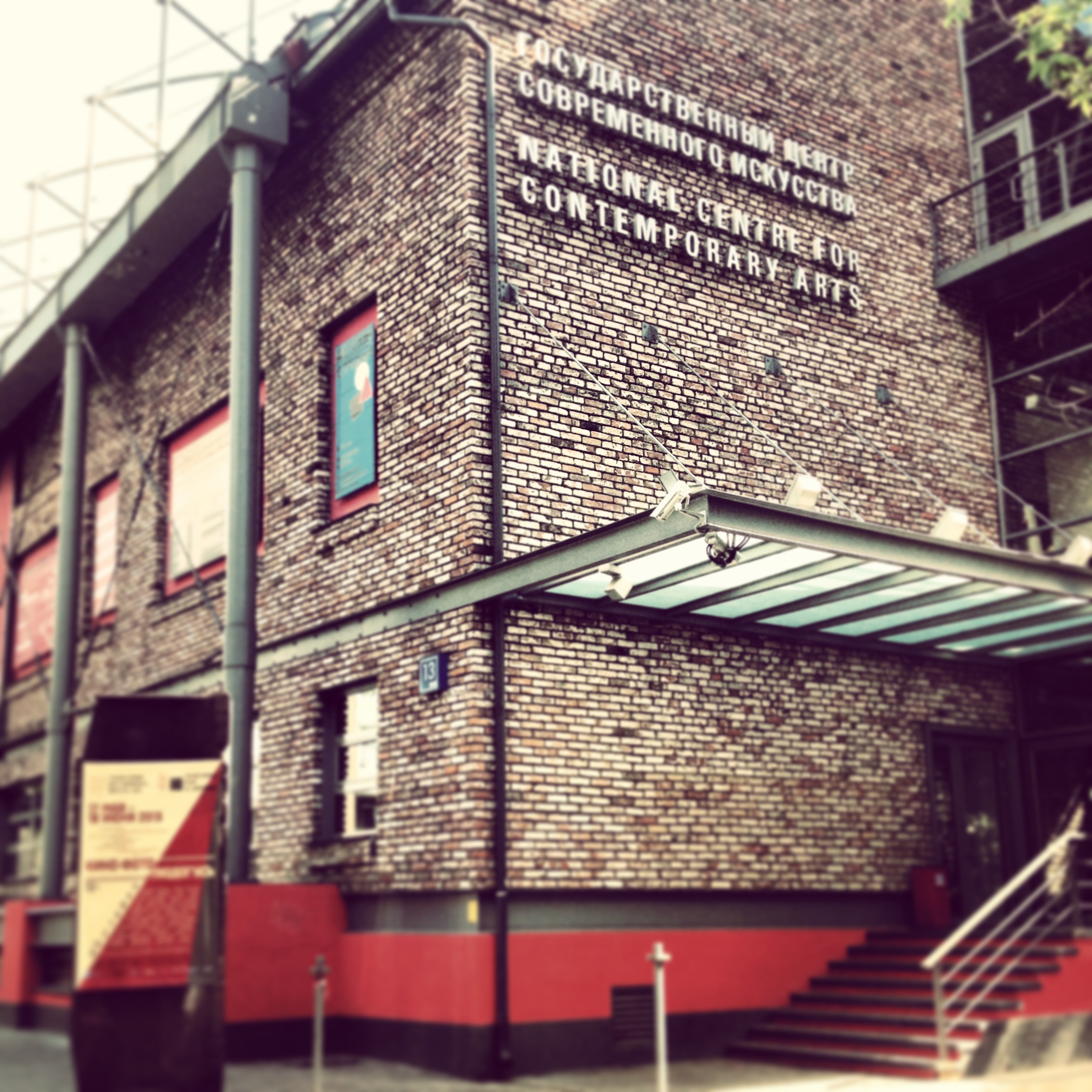

- Location within Moscow
- Established: 1992
- Location: Moscow, Russia
- Coordinates: 55.7892°N 37.6078°E
- Type: museum
- Website: Official site of NCCA

The National Center for Contemporary Art (NCCA; Russian: Государственный центр современного искусства) in Moscow, Russia, is a museum, exhibition and research organization which primarily aims its efforts at the development of Contemporary Russian Art within the context of the global art process.

== History ==
The museum was founded in 1992 by nonconformist figures of the Soviet Union. In 2012, the Ministry of Culture rejected the previously approved project to build the museum headquarters in Moscow. In 2016, the museum and all of its branches were disbanded and merged to the ROSIZO building. In 2020, the museum was taken over by Pushkin State Museum of Fine Arts.

== Architecture ==
The museum has nine branches around the country, which are in Vladikavkaz, Ekaterinburg, Kaliningrad, Nizhny Novgorod, Saint Petersburg and Tomsk.

== Exhibitions ==
The museum had been exhibiting various conceptual art of paintings. Until before the merger in 2020, the museum had had 72 exhibitions involving 919 artists, which were 56 group exhibitions and 16 solo exhibitions.

== See also ==
- List of Moscow tourist attractions#Museums
- Tretyakov Gallery
- Moscow Museum of Modern Art
- Moscow House of Photography
