= Zelfira Tregulova =

Russian art historian and curator

Zelfira Ismailovna Tregulova
- Зельфира Исмаиловна Трегулова
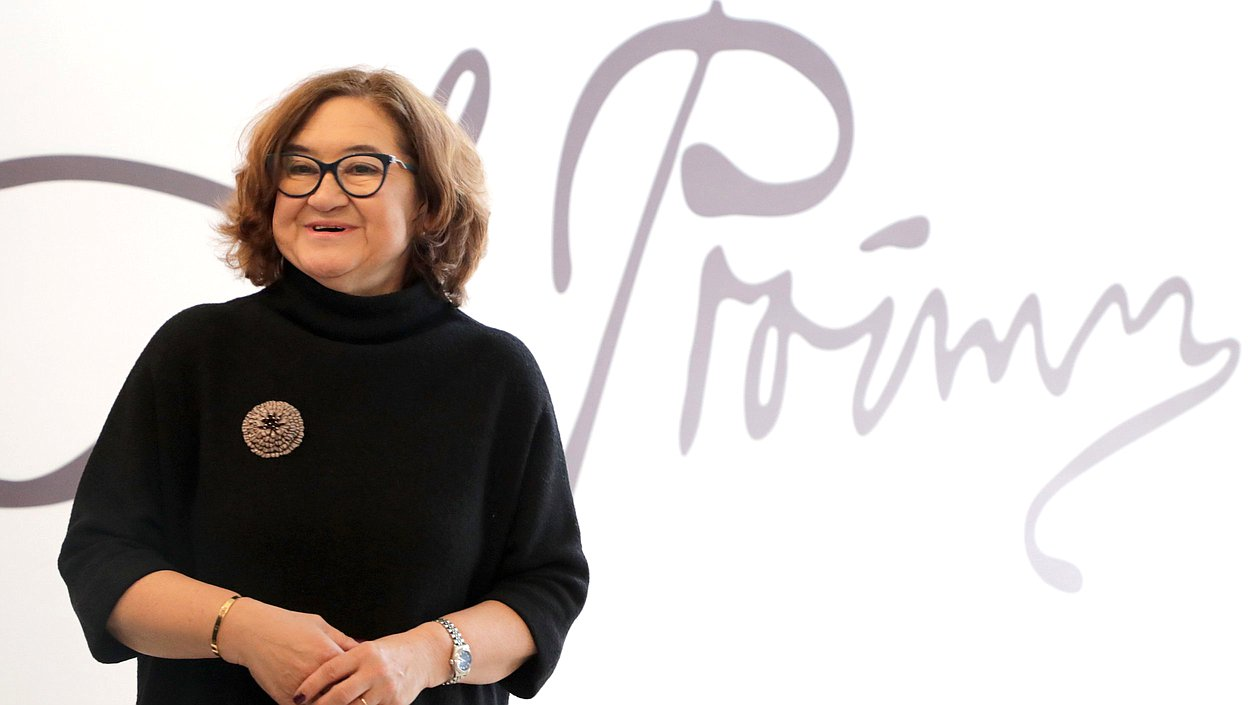
- Tregulova in 2020
- Born: 13 June 1955 (age 71); Riga, Latvian SSR
- Education: Moscow State University
- Employer(s): Solomon R. Guggenheim Museum (1993-1994); Pushkin Art Museum (1998-2000); Moscow Kremlin Museums (2002-2013)
- Title: Director (formerly)
- Board member of: ROSIZO (2013-2015); Tretyakov Gallery (2015-2023)

Zelfira Ismailovna Tregulova (Russian: Зельфира Исмаиловна Трегулова) is a Russian art historian and curator who served as a director of the Tretyakov Gallery in Moscow between 2015 and 2023.

== Early life ==
Tregulova was born on 13 June 1955 in Riga, Latvian SSR. She graduated in 1977 from the faculty of history of Moscow State University. Since 1984, she worked as art curator specializing in Russian art. In 1993-1994, Tregulova ran an internship in the Solomon R. Guggenheim Museum. Between 1998 and 2000, she worked at the Pushkin Art Museum in Moscow, and between 2002 and 2013 at the Moscow Kremlin Museums as a deputy director. On 14 August 2013, Tregulova was appointed the director of ROSIZO, a state organization which manages exhibitions and cultural projects in Russia. In the Moscow Kremlin Museums, she organized in 2012 the first ever exhibition of contemporary art in the history of the museum, the one by Henry Moore. Generally, during her time in the Moscow Kremlin and ROSIZO, she developed a solid reputation of an art curator, both in Russian and abroad.

== Appointment ==
On 10 February 2015, Tregulova was appointed the director of the Tretyakov Gallery. Her predecessor, Irina Lebedeva, was fired. The official explanation was that the visitor infrastructure of the museum was insufficient; unofficially media speculated that Lebedeva refused to support the Annexation of Crimea by the Russian Federation in public. However, Tregulova continued with the ambitious exhibition program which was started under Lebedeva. She organized a number of highly popular exhibitions, starting from the retrospective of Valentin Serov in 2016 that generated a long queue of visitors. The Tretyakov Gallery, which is a museum of Russian art, also started exhibiting art of other countries. Furthermore, Tregulova was actively extending the museum collection by pieces of contemporary art.

While director, Tregulova significantly expanded the exhibition areas. In particular, the building of the museum located on Krymsky Val was fully transferred to the Tretyakov Gallery. Tregulova ordered a reconstruction project of the building hiring architect Rem Koolhaas to carry it out. The project was slated started in 2023. She also opened the museum building in Samara, the first building of the Tretyakov Gallery outside of Moscow. Construction of two more buildings, in Kaliningrad and Vladivostok, started as well. In 2015, the first videoguide in sign language, the first one in Russia, was introduced.

== Controversy ==
In 2022, the Russian Orthodox Church demanded that the Trinity icon by Andrei Rublev be temporarily moved to Trinity Lavra of St. Sergius for an event in July 2022. The demand met with anonymous rejection of museum workers and art historians in Russia, since the painting requires special treatment and needs to be kept in a closed environment. However, Tregulova was apparently ordered by the Ministry of Culture to deliver the painting, which then had to undergo restoration for six months after it was returned to the gallery.

After the beginning of the Russian invasion of Ukraine, the policy of internationalization and modernization of the museum became obsolete. On 8 February 2023, Tregulova was fired and replaced by Yelena Pronicheva.
