= Moscow Polytechnic University =

Technical university in Moscow, Russia

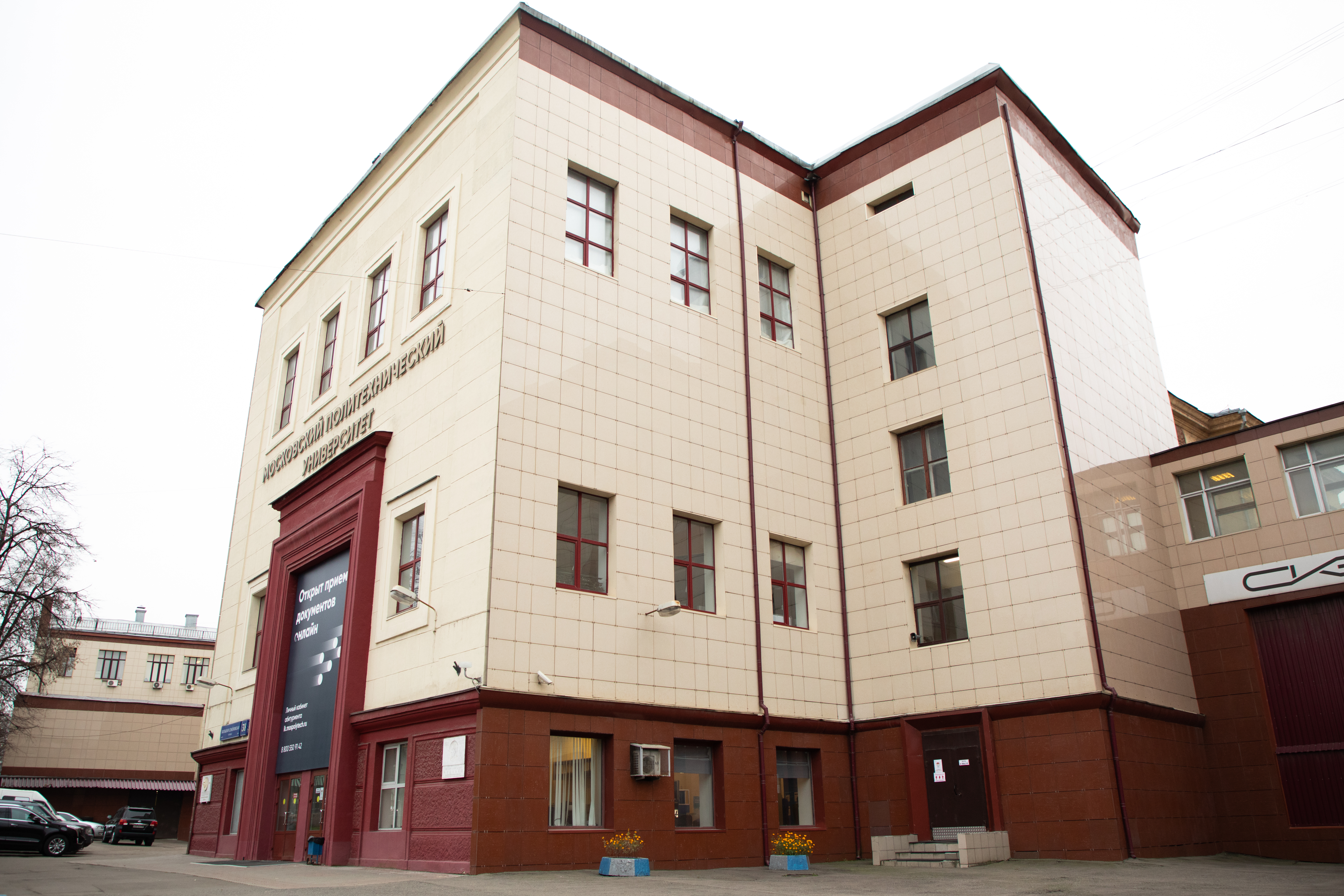
- Other names: Roman: Moskovski politekhnicheski universitet, Russian: Московский политехнический университет
- Former name: Komisarov Technical School
- Type: Public
- Established: 1865
- Rector: Vladimir Miklushevsky
- Location: B. Semyenovskaya St, 38,, Moscow, Russia; 55.78147040647276°N 37.71119273708416°E
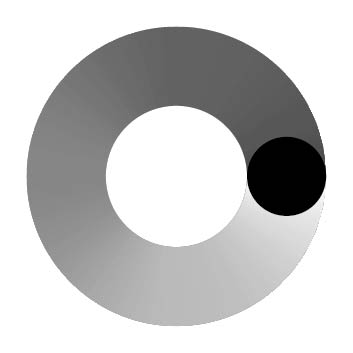

University rankings

Regional – Overall
- QS Emerging Europe and Central Asia: 351-400 (2022)

Moscow Polytechnic University (Russian: Московский политехнический университет, romanized: Moskovski politekhnicheski universitet) or Moscow Polytech is a university in Moscow, Russia. It specializes in the field of automobile design and, tractor design. It was founded in 1865 as Komissarov Technical School.

== History ==
=== Chernomyrdin Moscow State Open University ===
Moscow State Open University is an institution of higher professional education that considered itself the successor to the A. L. Shanyavsky Moscow City People's University.

The history of open public education in Russia began in 1870. The mathematician and educator Karl Karlovich Masing pioneered open education, including correspondence courses in technical and economics. Evening courses and classes, workers' faculties, and a real school were opened in St. Petersburg and Moscow, providing opportunities for secondary and higher education. He devoted much effort to the organization of the Polytechnic Institute.

In 1908, the world's first People's Open University was established in Moscow on the initiative of renowned statesmen P. A. Stolypin, D. A. Milyutin, M. M. Kovalevsky, and A. L. Shanyavsky. The decision of the State Council of Russia and the State Duma was legitimized by decree of Nicholas II. Secondary and higher education was provided at A. L. Shanyavsky University. Thus, the foundation for open public education in Russia was laid.

In 1932, the All-Union Correspondence Polytechnic Institute (VZPI) was established on the basis of the Polytechnic School and 10 industry-specific correspondence institutions by Order No. 907 of the People's Commissariat of Heavy Industry dated December 13, 1932 (S. Ordzhonikidze).

By decree of August 20, 1982, the Presidium of the Supreme Soviet of the USSR awarded VZPI the Order of the Red Banner of Labor.

In 1992, by a Decree of the Government of the Russian Federation signed by First Deputy Chairman G. Burbulis, the All-Union Correspondence Polytechnic Institute was transformed into the Moscow State Open University.

In 2007, the university celebrated its 75th anniversary and the 100th anniversary of open education in Russia. K. Masing, who founded the first workers' faculties, P. A. Stolypin, who founded the People's University in Moscow on Miusskaya Square (the building is now occupied by the Russian State Humanitarian University), and A. L. Shanyavsky, were among the pioneers of open education.

In June 2010, the MGOU branch in Baku was closed.

On July 26, 2011, the university was named after Viktor Chernomyrdin, who studied there from 1968 to 1972, although V. S. Chernomyrdin himself received his first higher education at the Kuibyshev Polytechnic Institute from 1962 to 1966. In accordance with the order of the Ministry of Education and Science of the Russian Federation dated December 20, 2012, the reorganization of the Chernomyrdin Moscow State Open University and the Moscow State Evening Metallurgical Institute has begun through a merger with the Moscow State University of Mechanical Engineering (MAMI).] The decision to merge the universities was made based on the results of the Interdepartmental Commission for Monitoring the Activities of State Universities.

In accordance with the order of the Ministry of Education and Science of the Russian Federation on the reorganization of the Moscow State University of Mechanical Engineering and the Ivan Fedorov Moscow State Printing University through a merger to form the Moscow Polytechnic University.

From 2012 to 2016, its name was Moscow State University of Mechanical Engineering (MAMI) (Russian: Московский Государственный Машиностроительный Университет (МАМИ)), where MAMI stood for Moscow Auto Mechanical Institute. On September 2016 the Moscow State University of Printing Arts became the Higher School of Printing and Media Industry within the university.
