= Maxim Kantor =

Russian painter and writer

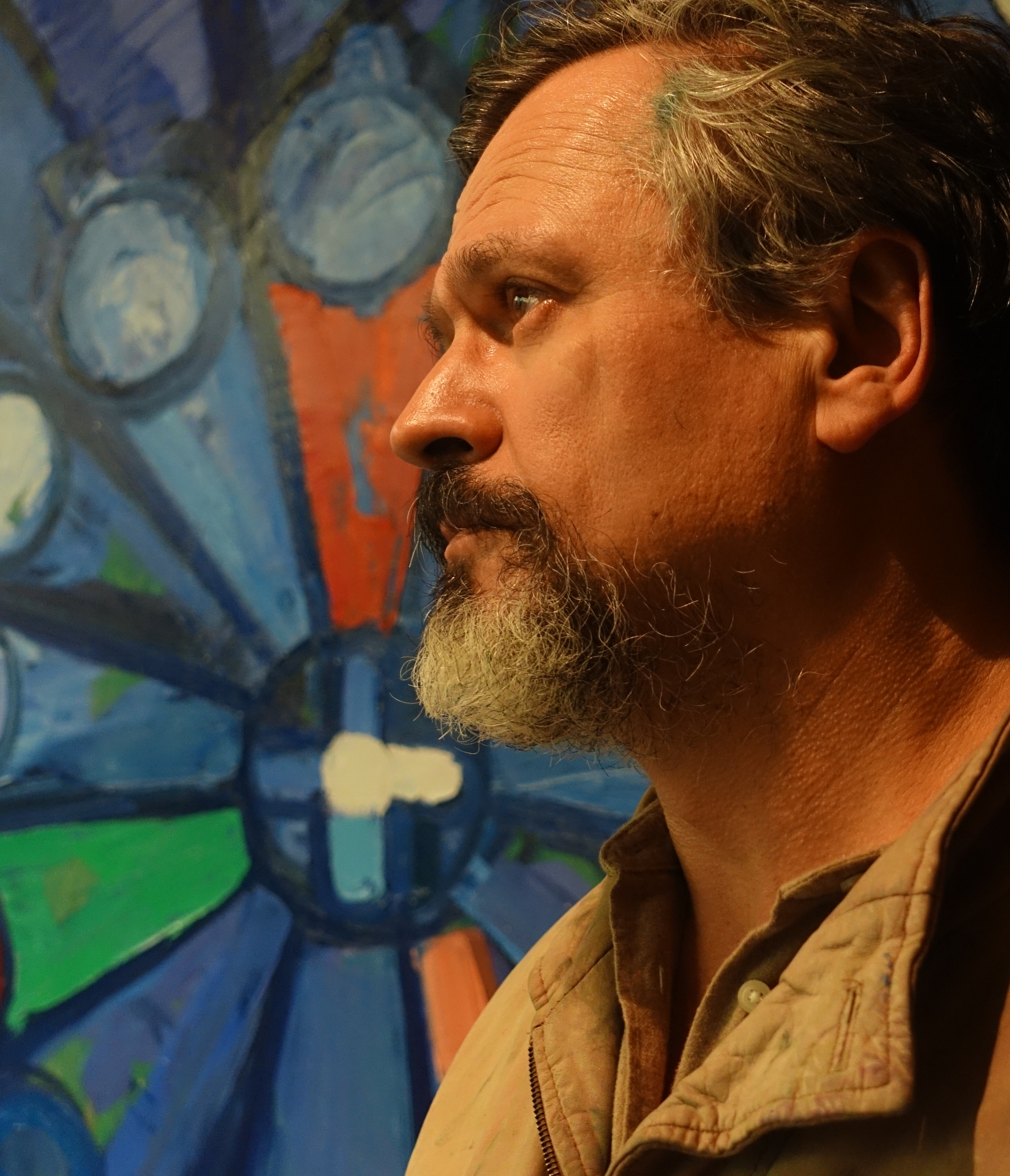
Maxim Kantor and his painting ROSE for the church Saint Merri in Paris, 2017

Maxim Karlovich Kantor (Russian: Максим Карлович Кантор; born 22 December 1957), is a Russian painter, writer, essayist and art historian.

Maxim Kantor's pictures can be seen in the Bundestag in Berlin, Genscher Saal (Library and Storm); the Pontifical Academy of Sciences St. Thomas Aquinas in Rome; Paris Saint Merry Church; Brussels Cathedral; Common Room of Pembroke College of Oxford, Hesburgh Library, University Notre Dame, Indiana (USA). He started to be exhibited in Europe since 1986. Held personal shows in museums around the world, among them: Frankfurt Staedel Museum, Schirn Kunsthalle, Moscow State Tretyakov Gallery, Bochum Museum, London British Museum, Akademie der Kunste, Berlin, Osnabrück Felix Nussbaum Haus, South Australian Gallery, Adelaida, Luxembourg National Museum, Saint-Petersburg State Russian Museum, Academy of Fine Art in Vienna, National Museum in Gdansk, etc. The detailed lists of Kantor's exhibitions and of the Museums and Collections with his works are attached. In 1997 he represented Russia on 47 Biennale d’Arte di Venezia with the personal exhibition Criminal Chronicle. He collaborated with a number of art galleries (Eva Poll, Berlin; Asbaek, Copenhagen; Nierendorf, Berlin; Wittrock Kunsthandel, Düsseldorf-Berlin; Barry Fridman, New York).

As a writer, he published several novels (Textbook of Drawing, Red Light, Hazard), translated into German, French, Italian, Dutch, and Polish, theatre plays (staged in Russia), and essay books. The book Thistle and Thorn published in August 2021, is dedicated to the philosophy of art and social history of Europe, and is based on researches and lecture courses held at Notre Dame University (IN US), Cambridge, and Oxford Universities.

As an author of graphic works in the tradition of "livre d'artist", he created Die Hermannsschlaht, The Ballades of Robin Hood, and Faust. He created etching portfolios (Atlases: Wasteland, Metropolis, Vulcanus) purchased by the National Libraries of France, Austria, Luxembourg.

In 2020 - 21 he executed the stained-glass window Saint Jerome and the Lion for the decoration of historical buildings of Moscow City Hospital No. 23 (Davidovsky Hospital).

Since 2021 Maxim Kantor has been holding lectures on history and philosophy of art on the YouTube channel Maxim Kantor. He is an Honorary Fellow of Pembroke College, Oxford. He was offered an honorary degree in philosophy of Turin University. Maxim Kantor lives and works in France (Ile de Ré), Germany (Emden and Berlin) and UK (Oxford).
