= The Blue Noses Group =

- Known for: Kitchen Suprematism
- Notable work: My (Slava Mizin)
- Style: Experimental; Video Performance; Conceptual
- Movement: Postmodernism

The Blue Noses, an artistic duo consisting of Alexander (Sasha) Shaburov and Vyacheslav (Slava) Mizin, was founded in 1999. The pair are known for their satirical and often provocative works, which encompass photographs, videos, and performances that parody and critique Russian society, art, politics, and religion. Using decidedly low-tech methods in their artistic endeavors, their works are often marked by black humor and some have labeled them as modern-day yurodivy, street people who, during medieval times, were believed to be both insane and touched by God.
