= ROSIZO =

Coordinates: 55°44′51″N 37°35′7″E

State Museum and Exhibition Center ROSIZO
- Государственный музейно-выставочный центр «РОСИЗО»
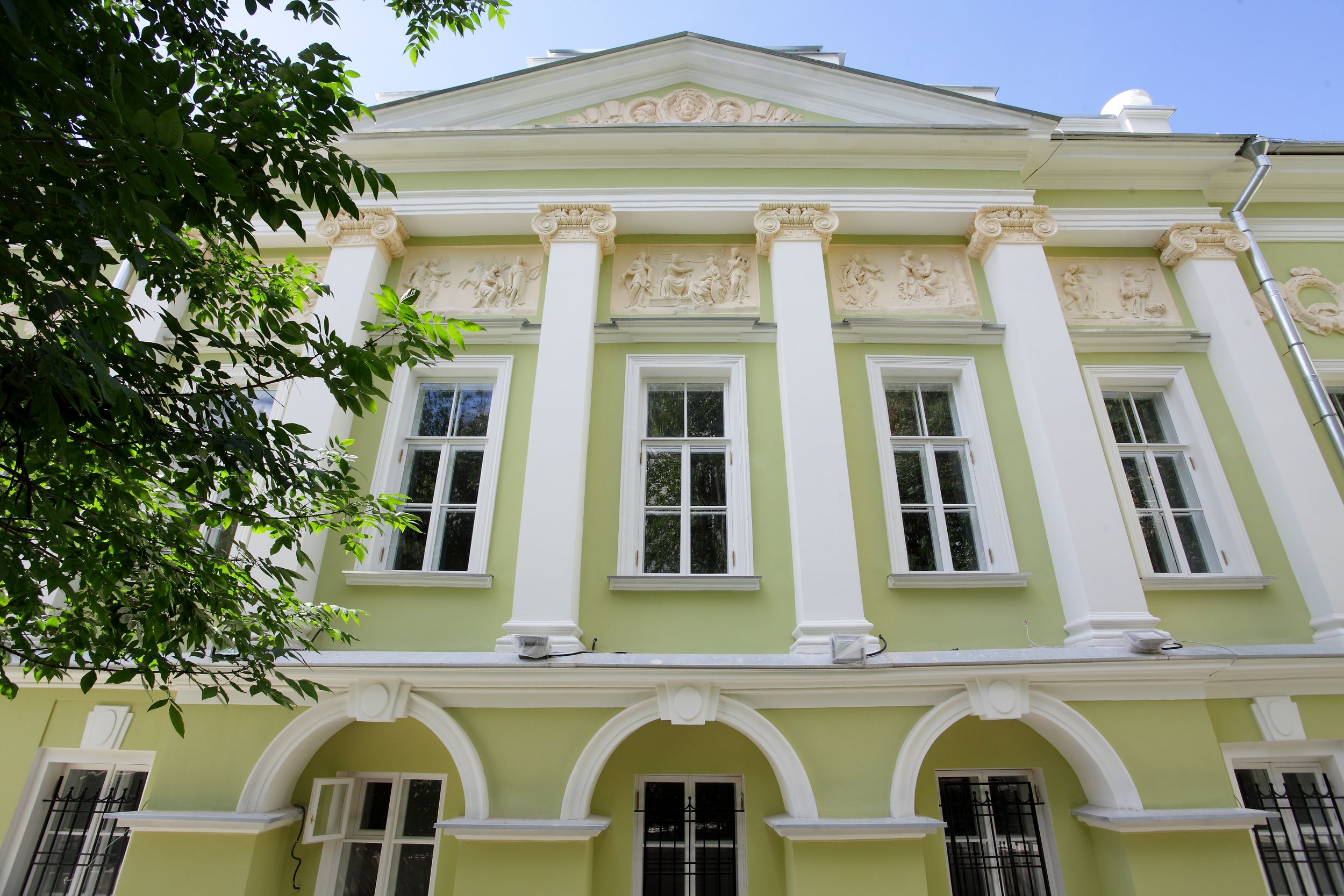
- The estate of Turgenevy-Botkiny is the headquarters of ROSIZO since 2019
- Type: Art museum
- Collection size: 45,000
- Director: Ivan Lykoshin
- Website: https://www.rosizo.ru

State Museum and Exhibition Center ROSIZO (Russian: Государственный музейно-выставочный центр «РОСИЗО») is an institution of the Ministry of Culture of the Russian Federation. It is a multidisciplinary organization that develops and implements exhibition, cultural and educational projects in Russia and around the world.

ROSIZO exhibitions are created both on the basis of their own collections and in the format of inter-museum and interdisciplinary cooperation. ROSIZO has its own collections of painting and sculpture, applied and folk arts, graphics and Soviet posters, as well as a collection of art from the late XX-early XXI centuries. The entire collection of ROSIZO has more than 45,000 items.

== History and collection ==
ROSIZO traces its history back to 1959, when the Directorate of Art Stocks and Design of Monuments was established under the Ministry of Culture of the RSFSR. From 1977 to 1994, there was the Republican Center for Art Exhibitions and the Promotion of Fine Arts "Rosizopropaganda". The center organized traveling exhibitions and distributed works of art to museums in the USSR. Over the years of the organization's existence, about 500,000 works of art have been transferred from its stocks to art museums, art galleries and museums-reserves.

ROSIZO's own collection was formed after 1992 and included the stocks of the former Ministry of Culture of the USSR and the All-Union Art and Production Plant named after E.V. Vuchetich. The resulting collection allows ROSIZO to make its own exhibitions and participate in the largest and most prestigious group exhibition projects - over its half-century history, ROSIZO has achieved a special place in the Russian and international art arena as an organizer of exhibitions.

From January 1, 2010, the State Museum and Exhibition Center ROSIZO acquired the status of a museum. The founder of the center is the Ministry of Culture of the Russian Federation. At present, ROSIZO operates about 40,000 storage units of the main stock.

On May 25, 2016, by order of the Ministry, the National Centre for Contemporary Arts (NCCA) was incorporated into ROSIZO as a structural unit. In 2019, the NCCA became a part of the Pushkin State Museum of Fine Arts.

== Structure of ROSIZO ==
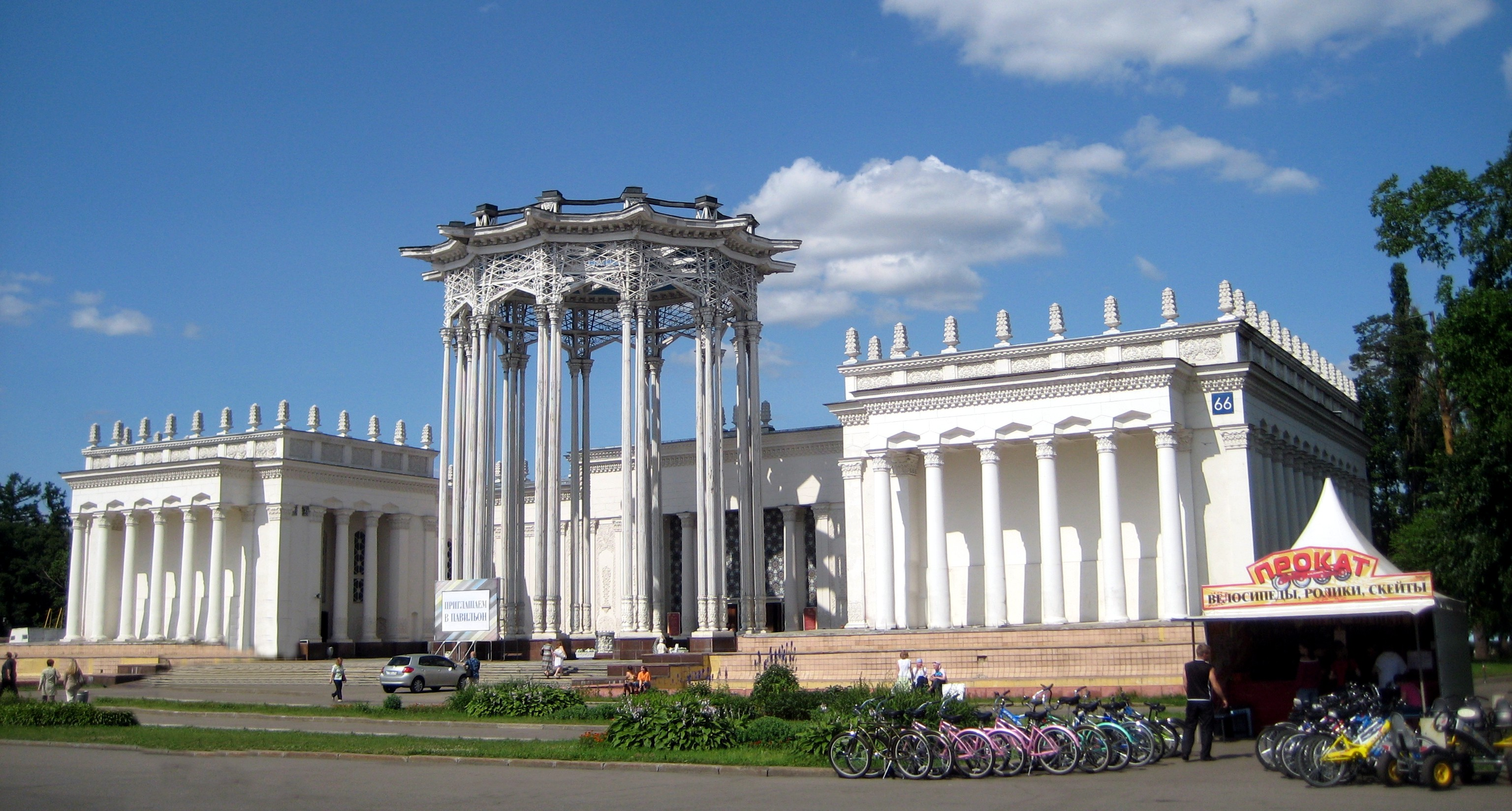
The pavilion "Uzbekistan" ("Culture", No. 66) at VDNKh was at the disposal of ROSIZO from 2016 to 2019.

ROSIZO has several sites in Moscow:

- Since 2019, the headquarters of ROSIZO has been located in the Estate of Turgenevy-Botkiny (Petroverigsky lane in the Basmanny District of central Moscow).
- Since 2017 ROSIZO runs the "Books" (No.516) pavilion at VDNKh (after restoration). Another pavilion, "Uzbek SSR" ("Culture"), was handed over to ROSIZO in 2016, also after restoration. For several years it has hosted various cultural events. However, in 2019, this pavilion was again handed over to Uzbekistan.
- A storage facility is located in the building on Profsoyuznaya Street. In addition, there are ROSIZO restoration workshops. All stages of the preparation of exhibition projects are carried out in the building: collection of exhibits, preparation of museum items for transportation. The work of curators, restorers and employees of the stocks accounting department is also carried out here.
- One of the offices of ROSIZO is located in the building on Lyublinskaya Street. Here is the department of regional exhibitions and some administrative departments. The building was erected in the late 1920s and is a monument to Moscow constructivism.

Among the structural divisions of ROSIZO there are quite unusual ones. For example, in 2001, by order of the Ministry of Culture within the framework of ROSIZO, the Directorate of the Museum Stock of the Russian Federation was created, headed by Alexander Sysoenko. Among other tasks, the Directorate was entrusted with the formation of the State Catalog of the Museum Stock of Russia, which includes a list of all the exhibits of all state museums in Russia.

== Exhibitions ==
The subjects of ROSIZO's interdisciplinary projects are very wide: from expositions dedicated to historical issues and exhibitions of Russian art to presenting the achievements of culture, science and various biennials of contemporary art.

ROSIZO was the organizer and coordinator of significant exhibitions of the late XX-early XXI century ("Amazons of the Avant-garde", "Moscow - Berlin", "Russia - Norway", "Moscow - Warsaw", "Russia - Italy. From Giotto to Malevich", etc.), held at major festivals in the world's leading museums: the Louvre in Paris, the Stedelijk Museum in Amsterdam, the Scuderie del Quirinale in Rome, etc.

A particularly significant event in the cultural life of Russia was the holding of the 1st Moscow Biennale of Contemporary Art in 2005. For Russia, this was a fundamentally new format of the event, and it was held entirely under the auspices of ROSIZO. The director of the center, Evgeny Zyablov, also acted as the Commissioner of the Biennale. Another global event of that year was the holding of a festival with Russia as the main guest of Europalia-2005, where ROSIZO presented 15 exhibitions at once. In the same period, from 2003 to 2006, the center was the organizer of the Russian participation in the Venice Biennale of Contemporary Art and Architecture.

Notable recent events include exhibitions: a retrospective of Viktor Popkov in Moscow (2013), Venice and London (2014), projects “Kazimir Malevich and the Russian avant-garde” (Amsterdam - Bonn - London, 2013–2014), “Palladio in Russia” (Venice - Moscow, 2015), “Cosmonauts: Birth of the Space Age” (London, 2015), “Russian avant-garde. Delight of the Future” (Mexico City, 2015–2016), “Always modern. Time for Cinema" (Moscow, 2016), "Facing the Future. Art of Europe 1945-1968" (Belgium-Germany-Russia, 2016–2017), "War through the eyes of eyewitnesses. Frontline drawing and poster" (Moscow, 2016), "The history of Soviet cinema in film poster. 1919 - 1991", (Moscow, 2016), "1917. Revolution. Russia and Switzerland” (Switzerland, 2017), “Valentina Tereshkova: The First Woman in Space” (Great Britain, 2017), “Revolution. Russian art 1917 - 1932" (Great Britain, 2017), "Builders of the new world. Comintern. 1918-1924" (Moscow, 2017), "Russian Arctic" (the first exhibition in the Zaryadye Park), the 4th Ural Industrial Biennale of Contemporary Art.

Since the beginning of the 2000s, ROSIZO has taken part in organizing more than 450 exhibitions in Russia and abroad.

== Cooperation ==
ROSIZO cooperates with museums across Russia and around the world, with private cultural institutions, foundations, public organizations and government agencies. Within the framework of inter-museum cooperation over the half-century history of ROSIZO, the works of Russian artists could be seen in Italy, Great Britain, Netherlands, United States, Mexico, China and in many other countries.

ROSIZO's partners in organizing exhibitions at different times were the world's leading museums, such as the Science Museum (London), the Centre Georges Pompidou (Paris), the Museum of the Palacio de Bellas Artes (Mexico City), the Royal Academy of Arts (London), National Art Museum of China (Beijing), the Museo Correr (Venice). ROSIZO cooperates with all regional museums of Russia, partners in the CIS, as well as the largest state museums - the State Tretyakov Gallery, the Pushkin State Museum of Fine Arts, the State Historical Museum, the State Central Museum of Contemporary Russian History and the State Hermitage Museum.

ROSIZO implements joint projects with Moscow museums of modern art - the Moscow Museum of Modern Art and the Multimedia Art Museum. ROSIZO's partners in exhibition activities are private cultural institutions, including the Garage Museum of Contemporary Art, the Jewish Museum and Tolerance Center, the Institute of Russian Realist Art (IRRI), well-known Russian and international foundations - the Foundation for the Development of Contemporary Art, the Beyeler Foundation (Basel, Switzerland), the V-A-C Foundation, public organizations and government agencies - the Russian Military-Historical Society, the Union of Artists of Russia, the International Children's Center "Artek", Russian Post and the Roscosmos State Corporation for Space Activities.

== Executives ==
- 1988—2000 — Oleg Shandybin
- 2000 — Vladimir Kudryavtsev (acting Director)
- 2001—2007 — Evgeny Zyablov
- 2007—2009 — Ramazan Koloev
- 2009—2013 — Alexander Lvov
- 2013—2014 — Zelfira Tregulova
- 2015—2018 — Sergey Perov
- 2018 — Vera Lagutenkova (acting Director)
- 2018—2019 — Sofia Grachyova
- 2019—2021 — Tatiana Volosatova
- 2021—2025 — Olga Galaktionova
- 2025—present — Ivan Lykoshin
