= Georgy Nissky =

Soviet painter (1903–1987)

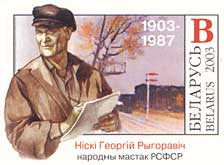
- Belarusian stamp of Nissky
- Born: Georgy Grigoryevich Nissky; January 21, 1903; Novobelitsa station, Gomelsky Uyezd, Mogilev Governorate, Russian Empire
- Died: June 18, 1987 (aged 84); Moscow, Soviet Union
- Awards: Stalin Prize; Order of the Red Banner of Labour

Georgy Grigoryevich Nissky (Russian: Георгий Григорьевич Нисский; 21 January 1903 – 18 June 1987) was a prominent Soviet painter and a founder of the severe style.

In 2019, an exhibition of his work was held at the Institute of Russian Realist Art.

== Biography ==
Nissky was born in the family of a station feldsher at a small Novobelitsa station not far from Gomel. He loved to draw since childhood, he studied at the fine arts studio, where he got thanks to the local painter Zorin.

After graduating from the M. A. Vrubel Gomel Art Studio-School in 1921, he went to Moscow and entered preparatory courses at the Higher Art and Technical Workshops (VKHUTEMAS). After completing the courses, he moved to the painting department, where his teachers were Robert Falk and Aleksandr Drevin. In addition to studies, he paid a lot of attention to sports, in particular volleyball and acrobatics.

== Awards and honors ==
- People's Painter of the RSFSR (1965)
- Stalin Prize, 3rd class (1951)
- Order of the Red Banner of Labour
