= Oleg Kudryashov =

Russian painter and printmaker

- Born: 24 January 1932; Moscow, USSR
- Died: 13 September 2022 (aged 90); Moscow, Russian Federation
- Website: oleg-kudryashov.com

Oleg Alexandrovich Kudryashov (24 January 1932 – 13 September 2022) was one of the most important Russian painters and printmakers of the Post-War era. He almost exclusively worked on paper using drypoint and watercolor/gouache as his medium. He is best known for his three-dimensional works, called constructions or reliefs, made by cutting and folding printed works to create sculptural pieces. Most of his works are unique or in very small editions.

== Early life ==
Born in Moscow, Kudryashov initially studied in an art studio for youths from 1942 to 1947 and at the Grabar Art School for Children from 1949 to 1951. After serving in the Russian military, he spent the next three years, 1956 to 1958, at the Moscow Animation Film Studios. In 1961 Kudryashov joined the Moscow Organization of Artists Union. He was well known in avant-garde circles but rarely exhibited together with his fellow artists. In 1974 he emigrated to London, England. Before departing he burned his life’s work of some twenty years in an open airfield on the outskirts of the Russian capital. After spending almost 25 years in London, he returned to Moscow in 1997.

== Career ==
Kudryashov’s work is difficult to categorize since it is at once both representational and abstract. He did not want to be pigeonholed and believes that ideology is the enemy of art because it limits the human imagination. Although his work was influenced by Russian constructivism and Suprematism, Lubok prints, and Russian Orthodox icons, Kudryashov did not share their utopian ideals.

Kudryashov created sculpture, videos, performance pieces, book illustrations, and an occasional collage but, was primarily a printmaker. His favorite technique was drypoint and engraving and his preferred material was the industrial zinc plate. Kudryashov did no preparatory studies prior to drawing directly on the plate using a large burin or engraving needle. For his larger prints he laid the sheet of zinc directly on the floor and works from all sides. For colored prints, paint is applied to the paper before being run through the press with the inked zinc plate.

== Later three-dimensional works ==
In 1978 Kudryashov systematically began to produce three dimensional reliefs from his drypoint prints. For these pieces, the image is run twice through the press and one of the images is cut into various geometrical shapes. Then, the cut-up geometrical shapes are slotted one into another and the resultant three-dimensional construct is attached to the initial print. These art works blur the boundary between printing, painting, and sculpture. While Kudryashov “draws on the zinc plate as if it where a piece of paper, he uses the printed paper as if it were metal, exploiting its stiffness to cut and bend it into rigid structures.”

Since 1978 Kudryashov has been exhibited and collected widely in Europe, the United States, Japan and Russia. He is currently represented by Robert Brown Gallery in Washington, DC. In recent years, Kudryashov has exhibited alongside artists such as William Kentridge at the Kreeger Museum's 'Against the Grain,' as well as David Nash and Richard Serra at Robert Brown Gallery's 'Flattening the Form'.

== Monograph ==
The first monograph 'Oleg Kudryashov. Bridge to the Future' was written by Christina Lodder, Edward Lucie-Smith, Igor Golomstock and Sergei Reviakin and published in the United Kingdom in 2017.

== Selected Public Collections ==
- Arts Council of England
- Baltimore Museum of Art, Baltimore, Maryland
- Museum Boijmans Van Beuningen, Rotterdam, Netherlands
- Collection of the City New-Ulm
- Contemporary Art Society, London, England
- Fitzwilliam Museum, Cambridge, England
- Grafische Sammlung, Schaetzlerpalais, Augsburg, Germany
- Hirshhorn Museum and Sculpture Garden, Smithsonian Institution, Washington, DC
- Hunterian Museum and Art Gallery, Glasgow, Scotland
- Kreeger Museum, Washington, DC
- Los Angeles County Museum of Art
- Minneapolis Institute of Art
- Museum of Fine Arts, Boston, Massachusetts
- National Gallery Prague, Prague, Czech Republic
- National Gallery of Art, Washington, DC
- Norwich Castle Museum
- The Phillips Collection, Washington, DC
- Pushkin Museum of Fine Arts, Moscow, Russia
- State Library of Saltykov-Schedrin, St. Petersburg, Russia
- State Museum of Literature, Moscow
- Tate Gallery, London
- Tretyakov Gallery, Moscow
- Trinity College Dublin, Ireland
- Victoria and Albert Museum, London
- Wakefield Art Gallery
- Yale Center for British Art, New Haven
