= Moscow State University of Printing Arts =

Coordinates: 55°50′0.47″N 37°32′38.81″E

- Московский государственный университет печати имени Ивана Фёдорова (МГУП)
- Type: State
- Active: October 21, 1930–2016
- Undergraduates: 7.000
- Postgraduates: 800
- Location: Moscow, Russia
- Website: Official website

Moscow State University of Printing Arts of Ivan Fedorov (MSUPA (MGUP in Russian); former name: Moscow Polygraphic Institute, Moscow State Academy of Printing) is Russia's largest university in the field of preparing specialists in printing and publishing.

== History ==
Founded in 1930 as the Moscow Polygraphic Institute (MPI) based printing department of the Moscow and Leningrad VHUTEIN. Initially, the MPI was administered Polygraphic union of the RSFSR Supreme Economic Council, was then subject to Narkommestpromu RSFSR, and the second half of 1930 - ASBMP (associations of state books and magazine publishers) of the RSFSR. In 1949, the Ministry of Higher Education of the USSR established a scholarship named after Ivan Fedorov for students MPI. At the same time in connection with the dissolution of Ogiz MPI over by the Glavpoligrafizdata USSR.

In 1993, the MPI was transformed into the Moscow State Academy of Printing (MSAP). In 1997 it received excellent marks and was given university status. From July 2010 MSUPA bears the name of Ivan Fyodorov, the pioneer of printing in Russia.

On March 21, 2016, the Ministry of Education and Science of the Russian Federation decided to merge the Moscow State University of Printing Arts and the Moscow International Automobile and Road Institute (MAMI) and establish Moscow Polytechnic University on their basis, which began operations on September 1, 2016. On September 1, 2016, the University of Printing Arts became the Higher School of Printing and Media Industry (HSPMI) within Moscow Polytechnic University.

== Structure ==
At the beginning of 2000's MSAPA conducted training on the five main faculties (now six) in 11 specialties. Number of students in 2002 was about 4000 people. MGUP structure includes 30 departments and employs 400 teachers (including 72 professors and doctoral degrees, 233 associate professors and PhDs).

== Faculties ==
- Faculty of Economics and Management
- Faculty of Print Media Technology (until May 2004 the Department of Printing Technology; until February 2011, Faculty of Printing Equipment and Technologies)
- Faculty of Digital Systems and Technologies (until May 2004 the Faculty of Mechanics and Control Systems)
- Faculty of Publishing and Journalism (Until 2007, Faculty of books and ads)
- Faculty of Graphic Arts (until 2004 Faculty of Arts and technical design of printed materials, HTOPP)
- Faculty of Advertising and Public Relations (up to 2007 Faculty of books and ads)
- Faculty of Excellence (Center for Continuing Education)
- Open Education Institute (Center for Distance Education)

== Publication ==
- "Proceedings of the higher education institutions. Problems printing and publishing"
- "Bulletin of Moscow State University Print

== Student theatre ==
From 1978 to the MSUPA operating, maintaining artistic continuity, student theater, which for nearly three decades, led by director Galina Ignatyevna Mishevich. The theater maintains a relatively stable repertoire and regularly gives tours in Moscow and other Russian cities and countries.

== Notable alumni ==
- Alexey Orlovski
- Irina Starshenbaum
