= Boris Matrosov =

Russian artist (born 1965)

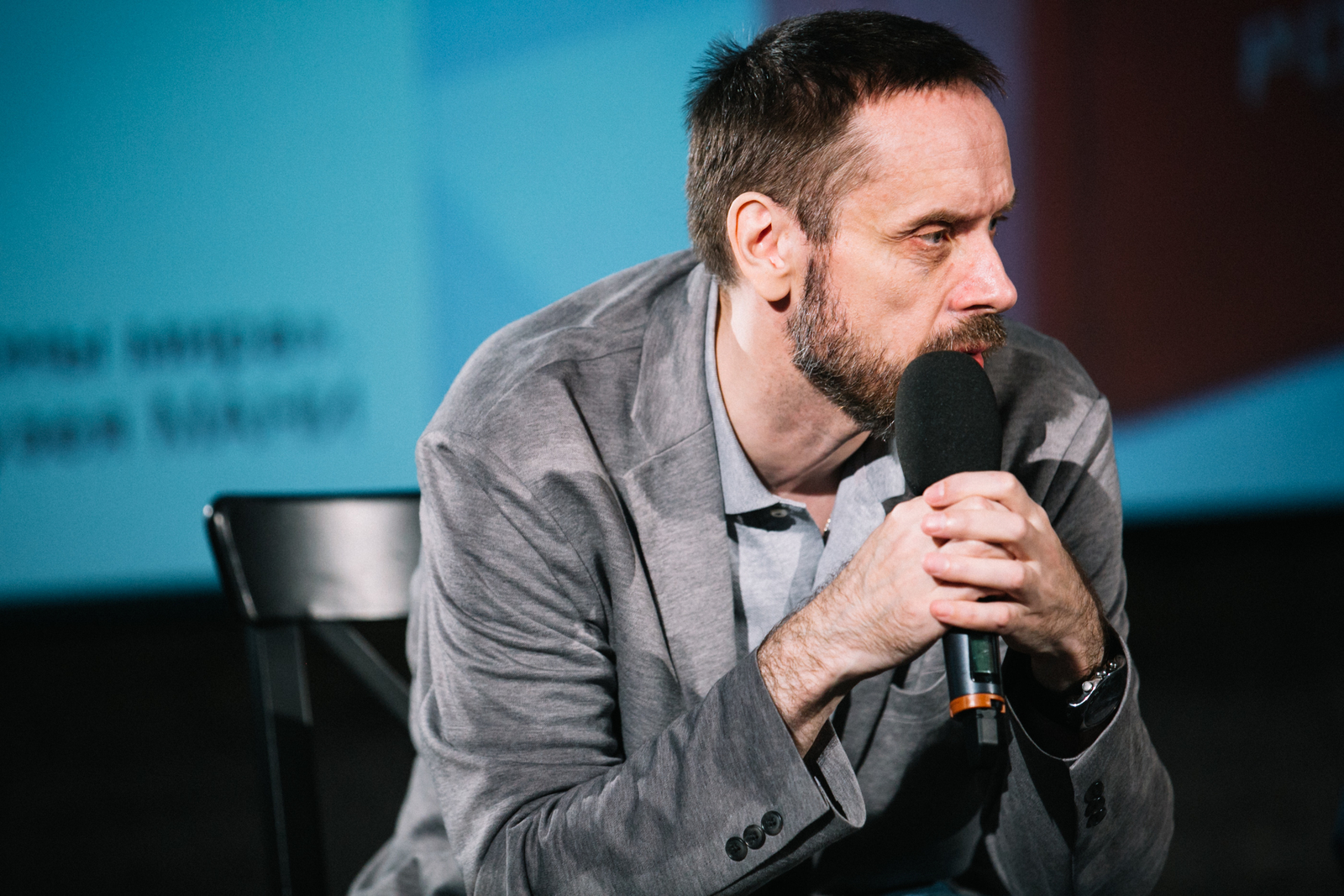

Boris Igorevich Matrosov (born 1965, Moscow) is a Russian artist, former member of the art group World Champions and Chair of the Avant-garde Club (CLAVA). Matrosov is best known for his work Happiness Is Not Far on a Perm riverbank.

== Life and work ==
Boris Matrosov was born in 1965 in Moscow. From 1986 to 1988 he was a member of World Champions (with Konstantin Latyshev, Andrei Yakhnin, Giya Abramishvili, and Konstantin Zvezdochetov, who was part of the group in its early days). In 1988, he was the Chairman of the Moscow Avant-Garde Club (CLAVA). From 1988 to 1990 he worked in the studios in Furmanny Lane, and from 1990 to 1994 at Chistye Prudy. He has been a member of the Moscow Union of Artists since 1994 and is currently based in Moscow.

World Champions were known for mocking the seriousness of the practices of the older generation of Moscow Conceptualists, such as Andrei Monastyrsky and Collective Actions. They received critical acclaim for absurdist actions like Strokes of Joy (where they worked collectively to create a drawing of random objects on a large sheet of paper attached to a wall) and The Gray Sea (in which Abramishvili brought a bottle of water from the White Sea and Zvezdochotov from the Black Sea, and the group mixed the water in a little pool, announcing the discovery of a new sea).

After the group broke up, Matrosov continued to work solo. He created “images of images” of the everyday world: interiors and landscapes painted minimally using black lines and monochrome color. In 2005, he made a text object Happiness Is Not Far, for the Art-Pole Festival, curated by Aidan Salakhova. The object was later installed on a riverbank in Perm, becoming an unofficial symbol of the city. In 2016, Matrosov made an object No, She Couldn’t Have Known How It Would All… (based on the text from his earlier work) on the rooftop of Garage Museum of Contemporary Art

Matrosov's works are in the collections of the State Tretyakov Gallery, Pierre-Christian Brochet, Paquita Escofet Miro, Igor Markin and Sergey Borisov

== Solo exhibitions ==
2015 — Only Paper. Peresvetov Pereulok Gallery, Moscow

2014 — The Austere Russian Landscape (with Nikita Alexeev). Gridchinhall, Moscow Oblast

2011 — Casual Painting. GMG Gallery, Moscow

2009 — Inner Ornament. Paperworks, Moscow

2006 — Conversation between a Deaf and a Dense Person. VP Studio, Moscow

2004 — Wooden Tango. VP Studio, Moscow

2003 — Guide to Miming with a Guitar (with A. Petrelli and A. Kuznetsov), Ulitsa OGI, Moscow

1990 — The Gray. First Gallery G1, Moscow

== Group exhibitions ==
2009 — The show must go on. GMG Gallery, Moscow

2009 — A Frozen Bear or a Russian Story as a Global Puzzle. Kunsthal Den Helder, Netherlands

2007 — Woe from Wit. The State Literature Museum, Moscow

2007 — The Future Depends on You. Pierre-Christian Brochet Collection. Moscow Museum of Modern Art

2006 — The Last Romantics of the Soviet Union. Zverev Center of Contemporary Art, Moscow

2005 — Accomplices. The State Tretyakov Gallery, Moscow

2005 — ArtKlyazma. Klyazminskoye Reservoir, Moscow Oblast

2003–2004 — A New Beginning. The Digital Russia (as a POTS member). Central House of Artists, Moscow

2003 — ArtKlyazma. Klyazminskoye Reservoir, Moscow Oblast

2001 — The Salient of Stability. Leningrad Blockade Museum (Rumyantsev Mansion), Saint Petersburg

2001 — Daedaluses and Icaruses. National Reserve Bank, Moscow

2001 — In-depth Germany. Na Kashirke Exhibition Hall, Moscow

2000 — CLAVA's Lovers (Avant-Garde Club exhibition at Art Moscow). Central House of Artists, Moscow

2000 — Ephemeris. State Library for Foreign Literature, Moscow

1998 — Motherland, Repin House, Shiryaevo, Samara Oblast

1998 — European-Style Renovation. Slavyansky Cultural and Historical Center, Moscow

1998 — Motherland or Death (Avant-Garde Club exhibition). Zverev Center of Contemporary Art, Moscow; The Museum of Non-Conformist Art, Saint Petersburg

1996 — How to Draw a Horse (Part 2). Central House of Artists, Moscow

1995 — Dry Water. Khan's Palace in Bakhchisaray, Crimea.

1995 — Moscow — Yerevan. The Question of the Arc. Modern Art Museum, Yerevan

1995 — About a House. Exhibition Hall at Profsoyuznaya 100, Moscow

1995 — How to Draw a Horse (Part 1). Horseracing Center in Sokolniki, Moscow

== Sources ==
- Maria Kravtsova. Interview with Boris Matrosov // Artchronica. 2008, No 12
- Konstantin Agunovich. Personal File: Boris Matrosov // Art-Azbuka
- Aleksanda Paperno. Interview with Boris Matrosov // Interview. 2014, No 25
- Artist talk. Boris Matrosov: Everything used to be free, and now you have to pay for everything.’ // ArtandYou.ru 17.10.2015
- Garage Museum of Contemporary Art. No, She Couldn’t Have Known How It Would All… by Boris Matrosov
- Boris Matrosov. 2016. Photo: Garage Museum of Contemporary Art
- Boris Matrosov. Zurich. 1990. (c) Sergey Borisov
- Boris Matrosov in Chistye Prudy Studios. Photo: Viktor Misiano
