= Mikhail Shvydkoy =

Russian historian and political activist (born 1948)

- Михаил Швыдкой
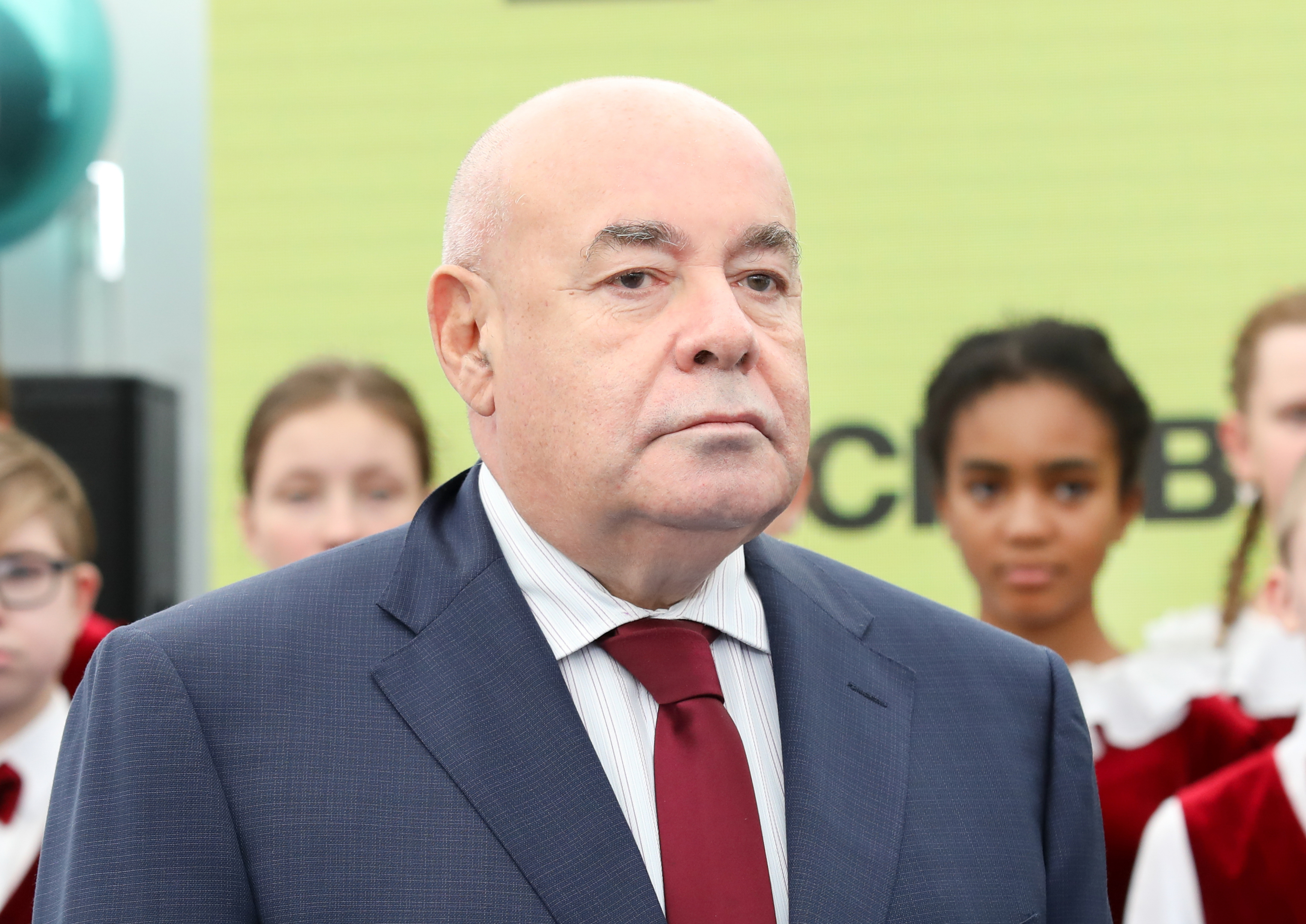
- Shvydkoy in 2023

Special Presidential Envoy on International Cultural Cooperation
- Incumbent
- Assumed office 31 July 2008
- President: Dmitry Medvedev; Vladimir Putin

Minister of Culture
- In office 8 February 2000 – 24 February 2004
- Prime Minister: Mikhail Kasyanov; Viktor Khristenko (acting)
- Preceded by: Vladimir Yegorov
- Succeeded by: Aleksandr Sokolov

Personal details
- Born: Mikhail Yefimovich Shvydkoy; September 5, 1948 (age 78) Kant, Kirghiz SSR, Soviet Union
- Education: Russian Institute of Theatre Arts
- Profession: Theatre critic; artistic director
- Awards: State Prize of the Russian Federation, Order "For Merit to the Fatherland", Order of Alexander Nevsky, Order of Friendship, Order of the Badge of Honour, Order of Merit of the Federal Republic of Germany, Order of Merit of Ukraine, Legion of Honour, Ordre national du Mérite, Dostlug Order
- Mikhail Shvydkoy's voice Mikhail Shvydkoy on the Echo of Moscow program, 22 April 2013

Mikhail Yefimovich Shvydkoy (Russian: Михаил Ефимович Швыдкой; born 5 September 1948) is a Soviet and Russian theater critic, drama, social and political activist. Laureate of the State Prize of Russia. The artistic director of the Moscow theater musical, supervisor of the Faculty of the Graduate School of cultural policy and management in the humanitarian sphere, Moscow State University.

He was the Russian Minister of Culture from 8 February 2000 to 9 March 2004 and the Chairman of the Federal Agency for Culture and Cinematography from 30 June 2004 to 7 June 2008.

Shvydkoy is an atheist.

== Awards and honours ==
- Order For Merit to the Fatherland 4th (2008)
- Order of Friendship (2013)
- Order of the Badge of Honour
- National Order of Merit (France)
- Order of Merit of the Italian Republic (2012)
- Legion of Honour (2011)
- Commander of the Order of Saint-Charles.
- State Prize of the Russian Federation (2000)
