= Dmitry Bisti =

Russian artist (1925–1990)

Dmitry Spiridonovich Bisti (Russian: Дмитрий Спиридонович Бисти; June 27, 1925 – October 21, 1990) was a Soviet graphic artist and woodcut illustrator.

== Life ==
Bisti was born in 1925 in Sevastopol, Crimea, Soviet Union. He studied at the Moscow Polygraphic Institute under A. Goncharov and P. Zakharov.

The best of Bisti's graphic cycles include the illustrations for The Iron Current by Serafimovich (1957), Homer's Odyssey (1959), Byron's selected works (1960), Lust for Life by Irving Stone (1961), Vladimir Ilyich Lenin by Mayakovsky (1967), and others. One of Bisti's other achievements is his series of xylographs The Internationale (1969). He was attracted by their authors' exalted way of thinking, and by the great emotional force of their art.

== See also ==
- List of Russian artists
