= Vladimir Logutov =

Russian contemporary artist

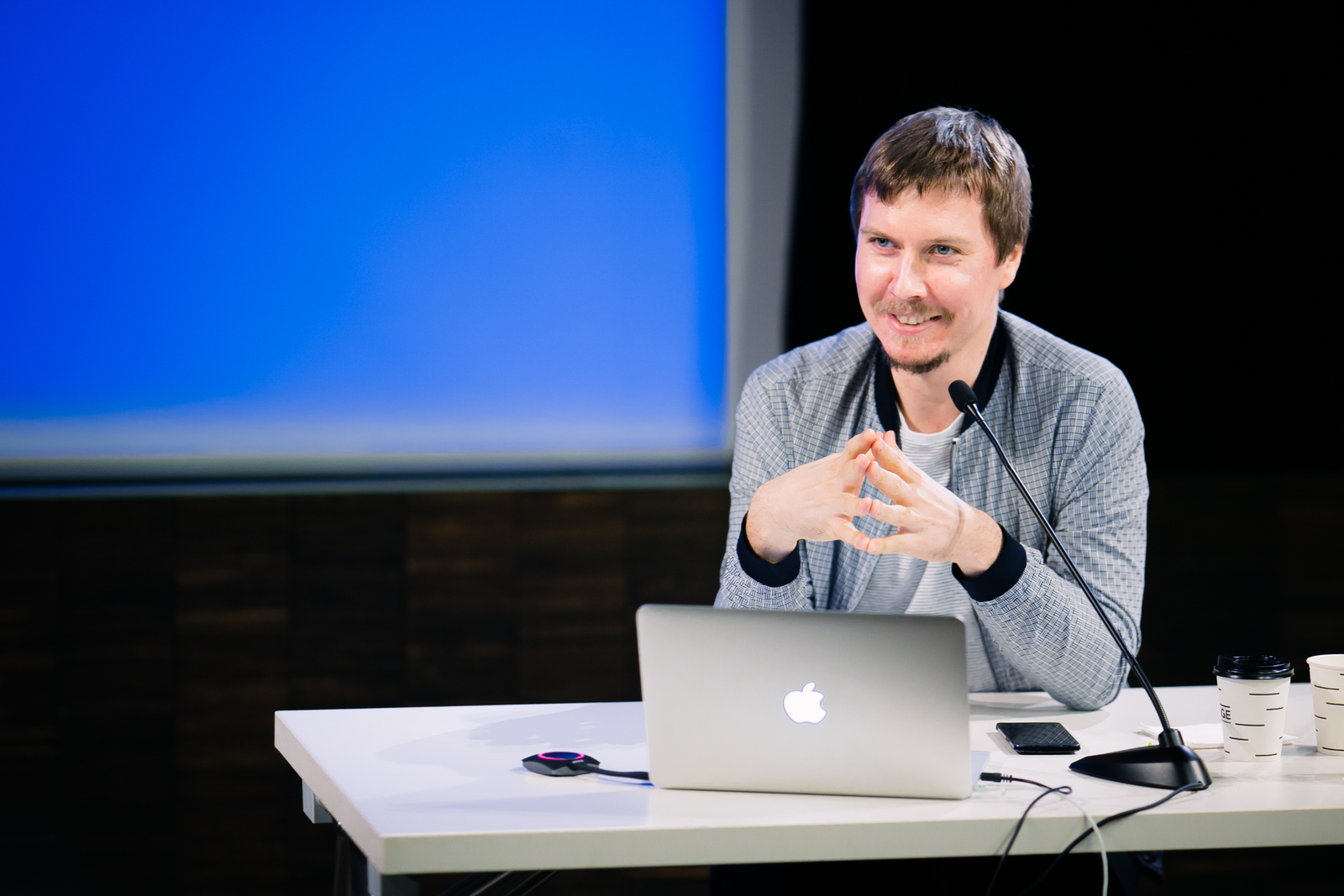
- Vladimir Logutov. 2017
- Born: Vladimir Andreevich Logutov; 24 October 1980 (age 45); Samara, Russia
- Education: Samara State Pedagogical University; Institute of Contemporary Art Moscow
- Known for: Video art, sculpture, painting
- Style: Contemporary art
- Awards: Innovation Art Prize (2018)
- Website: logutov.art

Vladimir Andreevich Logutov (Russian: Владимир Андреевич Логутов; born October 24, 1980, Samara) is a Russian contemporary artist working in video art, installation, sculpture, and painting. He is known for participation in the Venice Biennale, the Guangzhou Triennial, and exhibitions at the State Tretyakov Gallery and Garage Museum of Contemporary Art.

== Biography ==
Vladimir Logutov was born in Samara in 1980. He graduated from the Samara Art College (Department of Painting, 1996–2001) and later from Samara State Pedagogical University (Faculty of Fine Arts and Decorative and Applied Arts, 2002–2006). In 2005, he received an independent art scholarship from the Stuttgarter Kunstverein e.V. (Stuttgart, Germany), which enabled him to continue his studies in Germany.

In 2006, Logutov received the main award in the Cinema Without Film digital video competition at the Kinoshock Festival for his film About Me.

He has participated in numerous group exhibitions in Russia and internationally, including the 1st and 2nd Moscow Biennale of Contemporary Art, in video-art festivals at the Venice Biennale in 2011 and 2013, the 4th Guangzhou Triennial (2012), Russia 21: Contemporary Russian Art at the PinchukArtCentre (2009), and MODUS R: Russian Formalism Today, presented during Art Basel Miami Beach (2006).

== Selected solo exhibitions ==
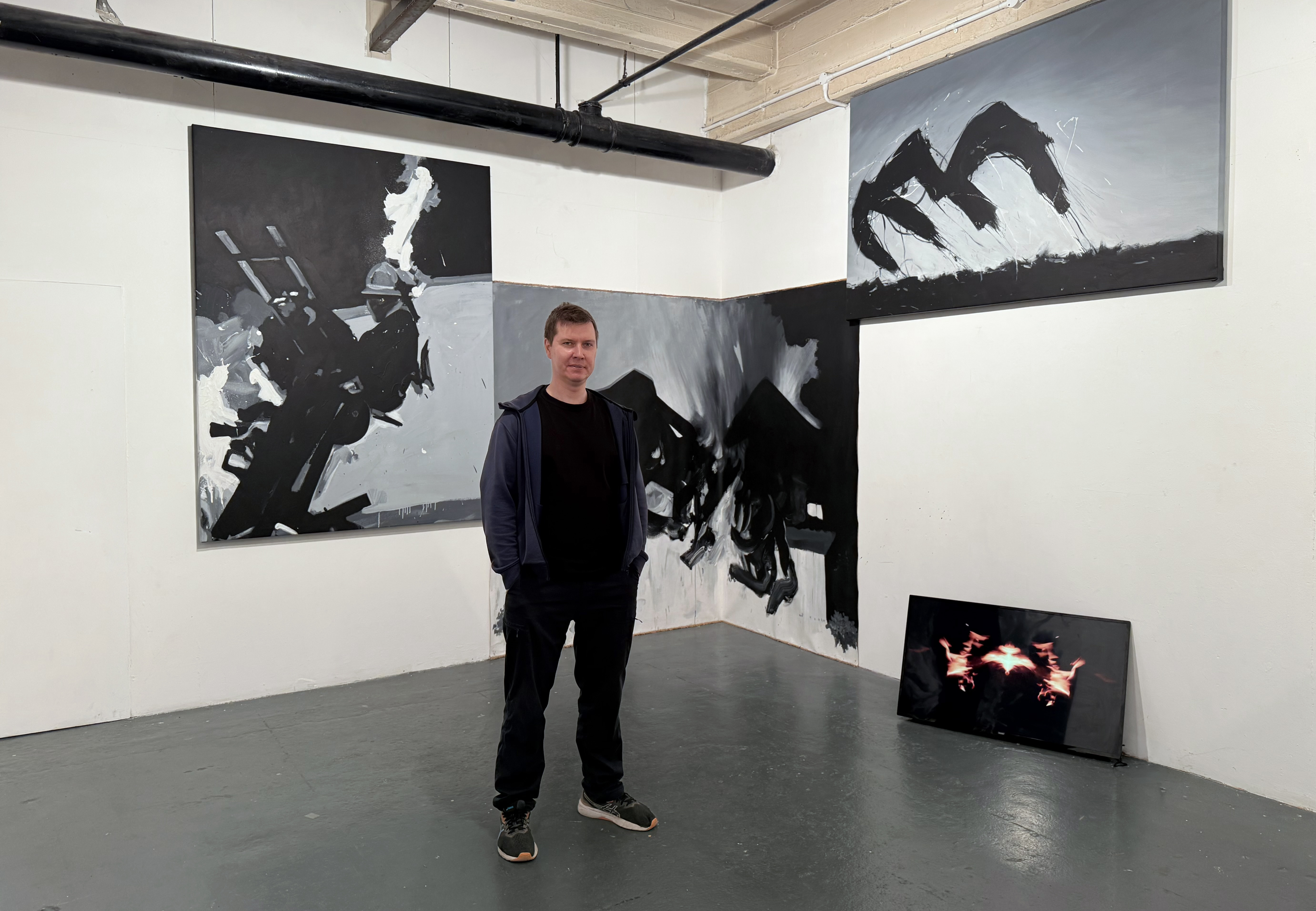
Vladimir Logutov on his exhibition Fire Run at Unit 3 Projects, London. 2025

- 2026 — Fireline. Kollectiv Centre for Contemporary Art, Folkestone
- 2025 — Fire Run. Unit 3 Projects, London
- 2024 — 42/44. Vladey Gallery, Moscow
- 2019 — Vladimir Logutov’s Working Studio. American Academy in Rome, Rome
- 2018 — Next Level 2,0. Aperto Raum, Berlin
- 2016 — Meeting. PERMM Museum of Contemporary Art, Perm
- 2015 — Encounters. Regina Gallery, Moscow
- 2013 — The end of the industrial era. Regina Gallery, Moscow
- 2013 — Interpenetration of the Visible and the Real. Stanislas Bourgain Gallery, Paris
- 2013 — Formal Relationship: Erik Bulatov – Vladimir Logutov. Gallery of the International University in Moscow, Moscow
- 2006 — Vladimir Logutov. Ikon Gallery, Birmingham

== Selected group exhibitions ==
- 2025 — It Happened to Me. Winzavod, Moscow
- 2023 — Lawless Imagination. RuptureXIBIT, London
- 2021 — Raw and Cooked. Ethnographic Museum, St Petersburg
- 2020 — 2nd Garage Triennial of Russian Contemporary Art. Garage Museum of Contemporary Art, Moscow
- 2020 — Generation XXI. Gift of Vladimir Smirnov and Konstantin Sorokin. State Tretyakov Gallery, Moscow
- 2019 — Central Russian Zen. Momentum, Berlin
- 2019 — After Us. Special project of the 5th Ural Industrial Biennale of Contemporary Art, Yekaterinburg
- 2018 — The Art of the 2000s. State Tretyakov Gallery, Moscow
- 2017 — Toward the Source. Garage Museum of Contemporary Art, Moscow
- 2017 — The Work is Never Done. Special project of the 4th Ural Industrial Biennale of Contemporary Art, Tyumen
- 2016 — Contemporary Art: Reboot. State Tretyakov Gallery, Moscow
- 2015 — The Promise of the Landscape. PERMM Museum of Contemporary Art, Perm
- 2014 — A Time for Dreams. 4th Moscow International Biennale for Young Art, Museum of Moscow
- 2013 — Lost in Translation. 55th Venice Biennale, Università Ca’ Foscari, Venice
- 2012 — The Unseen. 4th Guangzhou Triennial, Guangdong Museum of Art, Guangzhou
- 2010 — Modernikon. Contemporary Art from Russia. Fondazione Sandretto Re Rebaudengo, Turin
- 2009 — 21 RUSSIA. Group exhibition of the contemporary Russian artists. PinchukArtCentre, Kyiv

== Selected collections ==
- State Tretyakov Gallery, Moscow
- Moscow Museum of Modern Art, Moscow
- FRAC Bretagne Museum, Rennes, France

== Awards ==
- 2007 — Kandinsky Prize: finalist
- 2019 — Kandinsky Prize: longlist
- 2018 — Innovation Art Prize: Artist of the Year (winner)
- 2018 — Brodsky Fellowship Fund: fellow
