= Polina Kanis =

Russian artist (born 1985)

- Born: 02.08.1985; Saint Petersburg
- Education: Herzen State Pedagogical University, Rodchenko School of Arts

Polina Vladimirovna Kanis (born August 2, 1985, Leningrad) is a Netherlands-based artist, working primarily with performance and video. Her practice explores hidden power structures and the politics of affect, focusing on how ideological systems are embodied in everyday life. She is winner of the Kandinsky Prize (2011) and the Sergey Kuryokhin Prize (2016). She graduated from the Rodchenko Art School (Moscow) in 2011. Her work has been presented in numerous solo and group exhibitions, film festivals and film screenings, including a solo exhibition at the Haus der Kunst Munich (2017)., the VISIO program at Palazzo Strozzi in Florence (2019), the parallel program of the Manifesta 10, in 2015 at the Ural Industrial Biennale of Contemporary Art, Garage Museum of Contemporary Art (2014, 2018), the VI Moscow International Biennale of Young Art (2015), the Moscow International Experimental Film Festival (2016, 2018), the Hamburg Short Film Festival (2019) and many others. Her films are in the collections of numerous museums and foundations, including the Fonds régional d'art contemporain Bretagne, Fondazione In Between Art Film, Rome, Foundation Kadist, Paris, etc. Kanis was an artist-in-residence at the Rijksakademie van beeldende kunsten programs in Amsterdam (2017-2018) and ISCP New York (2020).

== Biography ==
Polina Kanis was born in 1985 in Leningrad. She graduated from the Herzen State Pedagogical University (2000-2006) and from the Nekrasov Pedagogical College No.1 (2000-2006). Later she moved to Moscow and worked as an assistant producer at Filmservice Production.

In 2008 enrolled at the Moscow Rodchenko School of Photography and Multimedia (workshops of Irina Meglinskaya and Kirill Preobrazhensky, 2008–2011).

In 2011 she was awarded the Kandinsky Prize in the Best Young Artist category for her project Eggs (2010). In the same year Kanis works on the project Workout, which was shown at the group exhibition Auditorium Moscow. A Sketch of Public Space at the Beliye Palaty exhibition hall, curated by David Riff and Ekaterina Degot. The work is also in the collection of the Kadist Foundation. In addition, Workout was presented as part of the exhibition In the Heart of the Country at the Museum of Modern Art in Warsaw.

In 2012, along with the group Voina, AES+F, Oleg Kulik and others, Kanis took part in the Russian Renaissance exhibition at Brot Kunsthalle, Vienna.

In 2013, she created the work New Flag about the difference between the representation of an ideological form and the mechanism of its creation. This project was shown in the group exhibition Rehearsal Time at the Triumph Gallery. The work was also presented at Kanis' solo exhibition of the same name in New Holland (2013).

In 2014, Kanis is working on two projects: Celebration and Parade Portrait. In Celebration, the artist shows a moment of repression lurking in the ritual of celebration: "This work captures a moment when the repression that is embedded in everyday life is crystallized during a ritual of celebration. It shows us men in uniform dancing indifferently with each other. We do not understand who they are, why they are together and what will happen next. Although united in action, it is a strongly felt that each of the characters remains in his personal space, quite alienated from the others. It takes time to realize that the absurdity of the scene is a challenge to vision itself. More than a plea for empathy that maintains a safe distance, it is a diagnosis presented to the audience. But the distance between scene and audience disappears when the suspicion arises that this contrived image of the world is the nightmare of social reality. In this conventional celebration the sparkling trash is not jolly, and the signs of attraction do not entice. Absurdity remains the inherent meaning of these ritual exchanges. They are the worm-eaten fruit of tradition" – A. Evangely on Celebration.

This project by Polina Kanis was awarded a special prize by the Stella Art Foundation and the Institut Français as part of the Innovation Award (2014). Celebration by Kanis was also presented at the Ural Industrial Biennale of Contemporary Art in 2015. Luigi Pecci Center for Contemporary Art (Centro Pecci) chose the work Celebration for the exhibition The End of the World.

With her work Formal Portrait Kanis participated in the parallel program of the Manifesta 10 in 2014. "The main motif becomes the infinity of waiting – we hear the roar of the motor as a symbol of readiness for action, the pole is prepared, the figures obediently fold into the flag – this endless rehearsal is doomed to remain in eternity without becoming a moment of history. The ritual of raising the flag, designed to demonstrate a victorious force, in a staged infinity, only exposes the powerlessness of the action produced: the flag is raised in closed, publicly invisible territory, its solemn raising becoming a metaphor for a victory that will never happen" – Daria Atlas.

In 2016 Kanis received the Sergey Kuryokhin Award in the "Best Media Object" category for the project The Pool (2015). The project was first presented at the exhibition Inside the Event at Artwin Gallery as a special project of the 6th Moscow Biennale of Contemporary Art (2015). The Pool was also shown at the Rauma Biennale Balticum (2016). Three years later, Kanis' The Pool was presented at VISIO. Moving Images After Post-Internet at the Palazzo Strozzi in Florence, curated by Leonardo Bigazzi. The video is in several collections, including In Fondazione Between Art Film and the Fonds régional d'art contemporain Bretagne.

In 2016, the artist participated in the Rote Fabrik art residency in Zurich with the support of the Swiss Cultural Council Pro Helvetia.

In 2017, Polina Kanis had a solo exhibition at the Haus der Kunst Munich curated by Daniel Milnes. "In The Procedure Kanis takes a fictional museum building lying in ruins after an unknown disaster as the starting point for her meditations on collectivity and division. As the sequences unfold the viewer becomes privy to a hermetically sealed system, with the building and the surrounding forest now forming an exclusion zone. Access to the outside world is permitted only after completing the routine procedure of questioning and body search in the border zone. Any attempts to ascertain what has happened to the building elicit the same response from the people interviewed: "I saw nothing." As we begin to unravel the logic of this universe, we realize that the unknown event which has led the characters to this point has become secondary to the procedure that has developed in its wake" – Daniel Milnes.

The Procedure project was shown as part of the online pavilion of the Russian Federation "Open?" at the Venice Architecture Biennale (2020). The Procedure was short-listed for the 2016 Kandinsky Prize.

In 2017–2018, Polina Kanis was an artist-in-residence at the Royal Academy of Fine Arts in Amsterdam (Rijksakademie van beeldende kunsten). During this time, Kanis creates the project Adaptive Degradation.

Since 2019 she has been teaching at the Rodchenko Moscow School of Photography and Multimedia. Together with Boris Klyushnikov, Andrei Kachalyan and Kirill Savchenkov, Kanis teaches the workshop Image in Motion.

In 2020 the artist starts working on the project Toothless Resistance, which consists of several parts. The first part was created as part of the Turbulence program organized by the Cultural Creative Agency (CCA) with the assistance of the Embassy of Qatar in Russia. The second part of the project Toothless Resistance. Friendship Tree was shown at the Survival Kit contemporary art festival organized by the Latvian Center for Contemporary Art in 2020. The next part of Toothless Resistance will be realized as part of the exhibition in Moscow in 2021.

In 2020, Kanis was the recipient of the AES+F Artist Residency Award grant, through which Polina Kanis became a resident at The International Studio & Curatorial Program (ISCP) in New York.

She collaborates with Artwin gallery (Moscow) and Galerie C (Neuchâtel)

Based in Ewijk.

== Selected personal and group exhibitions ==
- 2021 – Post-Soviet Histories, REDCAT – Roy and Edna Disney/CalArts Theater, Los Angeles
- 2020 – "Des théâtres du silence", Galerie C, Neuchâtel
- 2020 – The Contemporary Art Festival Survival Kit, Latvian Centre for Contemporary Art, Riga
- 2020 – A4 x Kadist Video Library Project, Screening, A4 Art Museum, Chengdu
- 2020 – The Turbulence, CCA Gostiny Dvor, Moscow
- 2020 – Generation XXI. The gift from Vladimir Smirnov and Konstantin Sorokin, The Tretyakov Gallery, Moscow
- 2020 – Other Zones, Film program for the Russian Federations' pavilion of the 2020 Venice Architecture Biennale
- 2020 – CYLAND Video Archive, The Oberhausen International Short Film Festival
- 2019 – VISIO. Moving Images After Post-Internet, Palazzo Strozzi, Florence
- 2018 – Rijksakademie Open, The Rijksakademie van beeldende kunsten, Amsterdam
- 2018 – "The beginning, the end and everything between them", NCCA Ural, Ekaterinburg
- 2018 – Performing Words, Filmwerkstatt, Düsseldorf
- 2017 – Rijksakademie Open, The Rijksakademie van beeldende kunsten, Amsterdam
- 2017 – Metronomes, Galerie C, Neuchâtel
- 2017 – Solo Show Polina Kanis, IkonoTV, Berlin
- 2017 – The Procedure, Haus Der Kunst, Munich
- 2017 – Videobox Festival, Carreau du Temple, Paris
- 2017 – "When the other meets the other Other? What matters? What not", Cultural Center Belgrade, Belgrade
- 2016 – The End of the World, The Centro per l'Arte Contemporanea Luigi Pecci, Prato
- 2016 – Rauma Biennale Baiticum 2016, Rauma Art Museum, Rauma
- 2016 – Anthropo(s)cène, Galerie C, Neuchâtel
- 2015 – Balagan!!!, Kunstquartier Bethanien, Berlin
- 2015 – Spaces for Maneuver — Between Abstraction and Accumulation, Main Project of 3rd Ural Industrial biennial of contemporary art, Ekaterinburg
- 2015 – Inside an Event, Special Project of the 6th Moscow Biennale of Contemporary Art, Artwin Gallery
- 2014 – The World Must Still Be Young, Stiftelsen 3,14, Bergen
- 2014 – Semiconductors, Stella Art Foundation, Moscow
- 2014 – Russian Performance: A Cartography of its History, Garage museum of contemporary art, Moscow
- 2014 – Not a Museum. Aesthetic Suspicious Lab, First Cadets' Corpus, St. Petersburg
- 2013 – In the Heart of the Country, Museum of Modern Art, Warsaw
- 2013 – Rehearsal Time, Triumph Gallery, Moscow
- 2012 – I am Who I am, Kunsthalle Düsseldorf, Düsseldorf
- 2012 – School of Freedom, Paperworks Gallery, Moscow
- 2012 – Angry Birds, Museum of Modern Art, Warsaw
- 2012 – Russian Renaissance, Brot Kunsthalle, Wien
- 2011 – Auditorium Moscow. A Sketch for a Public Space, Bielie Palaty, Moscow
- 2010 – "GOGOLFEST Festival", Kyiv
- 2010 – "East End Film Festival/10, Russian Art Festival", The Foundry Gallery, London

== Awards ==
- 2019 finalist, ARCOmadrid Video Art Award
- 2019 finalist, Kandinsky Art Prize, in the "Project of the Year" category
- 2017 finalist, Kandinsky Art Prize, in the "Project of the Year" category
- 2016 Sergey Kuryokhin Contemporary Art Award, in "Best Media Object" category
- 2016 finalist, Kandinski Prize Young Artist, Project of the Year
- 2016 nominated, Innovation Prize, in "New Generation" category
- 2015 nominated, Innovation Prize, in "New Generation" category (Stella Art Foundation Prize and Institute of France Prize)
- 2014 nominated, Innovation Prize, in "New Generation" category
- 2011 winner, Kandinski Prize, Young Artist, Project of the Year
- 2011 nominated, Innovation Prize, in "New Generation" category

== Collections ==
- Fonds régional d'art contemporain Bretagne (Frac Bretagne), Rennes
- Fondazione In Between Art Film, Rome
- Kadist Art Foundation, Paris
- Museum of Modern Art, Warsaw
- National Center for Contemporary Arts
- Moscow Aksenov Family Foundation, Moscow
- Gazprombank collection, Moscow
- The Foundation of Vladimir Smirnov and Konstantin Sorokin, Moscow
- Art and Science Videoinsight Foundation Bologna
- Stella Art Foundation, Moscow
- Multimedia Art Museum, Moscow
