= Evgeny Granilshchikov =

Russian artist and film director

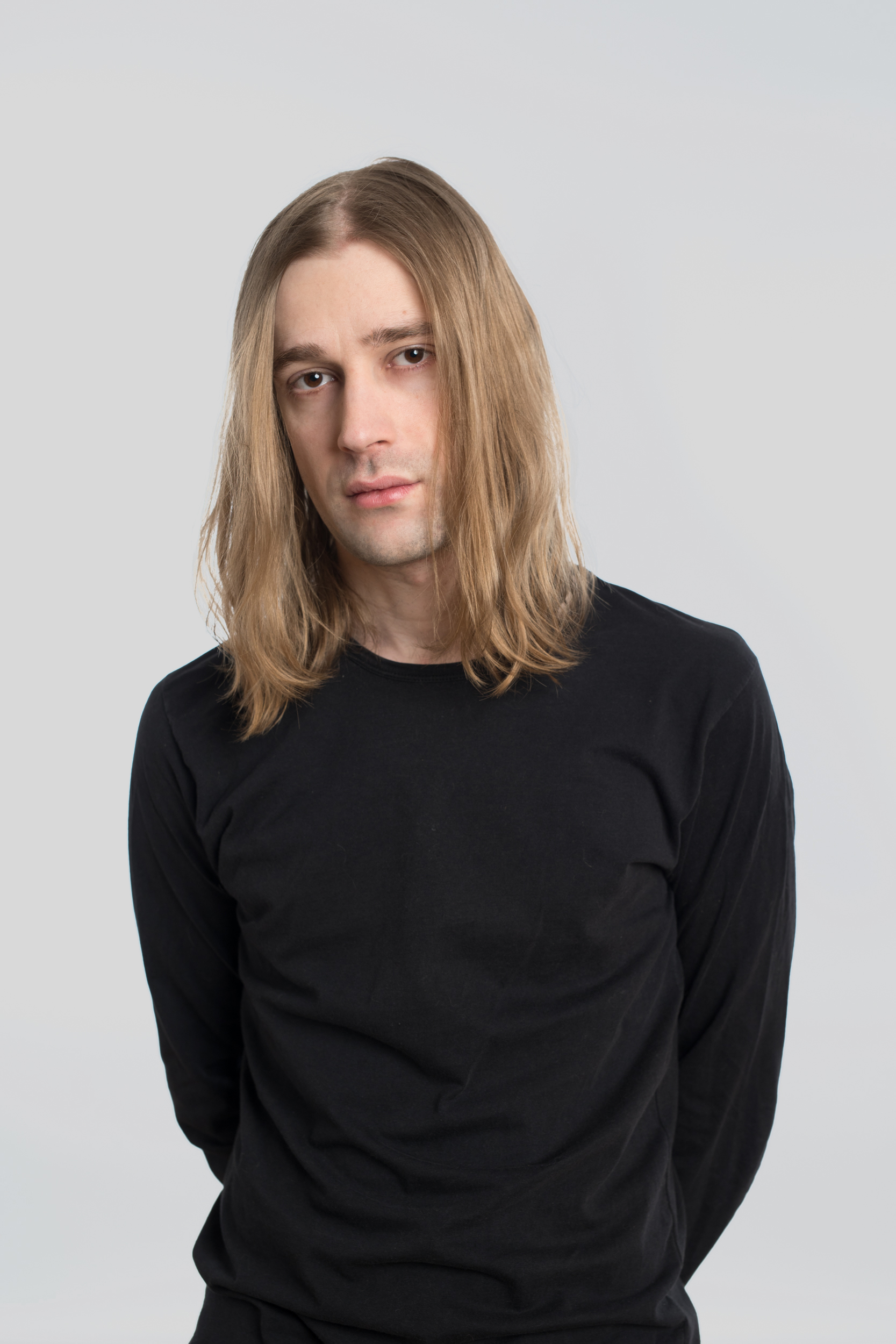

Evgeny Granilshchikov (born June 23, 1985, in Moscow) is a Russian artist and independent film director. He currently lives and works in Clermont-Ferrand, France.

Granilshchikov's works include video and sound art, photography, installation, and independent cinema. His projects explore questions of his own generation as well as themes of personal and political frustrations.

== Biography ==
Granilshchikov graduated from the Lyceum of Animation Cinematography (2004), the Moscow Institute of Journalism and Literature, Department of Journalism and Photography (2009), and the Rodchenko Moscow School of Photography and Multimedia where he studied at Igor Mukhin's studio in 2010–2013.

In 2013–2015 Granilshchikov received a scholarship from the Garage Museum of Contemporary Art.

== Description of films ==
"A direct point of view, medium-shot, but more often a long shot, the interspersing of long and short episodes, an uneven rhythm," describes Granilshchikov himself. "In this film, there is no classical narrative, as if it has been assembled from chance scenes which have no unambiguous links between them. We never find out where the characters are going, what their aims are, but we see how an implicit feeling of alarm is hidden behind all their simple actions and movements."

== Career ==
Bohemia (2009–2011) and Insomnia (2011) photo series are the first two projects completed by Granilshchikov. His thesis became a three-channel film Positions. It depicts personal and political search of three Muscovites. For this work, Granilshchikov won the Kandinsky Prize for "New Artist. Project of the Year" in 2013.

In 2013–2014 artist's works were on display at the cycle of shows High Hopes, organized by the Museum of Screen Culture Manege | MediaArtLab.

In 2014, Granilshchikov's film Courbet's Funeral was screened at the 4th Moscow International Biennale for Young Art, The film also appeared at the Kino Der Kunst festival in Munich It was named as one of the best artworks of year 2014 by aroundart.org. The film was shot using a smartphone and comprised found videos, both documentary and production footage.

In 2015, Unfinished Film (2015) was screened during the International Short Film Festival Oberhausen and goEast Festival of Central and Eastern European Film, where it won the OPEN FRAME AWARD. The film was also shortlisted in the New Generation" cateogrof the Innovation Prize-2014, the 10th all-Russian competition in contemporary art.

Together with the short video Untitled (reenactment), works Courbet's Funeral and Unfinished Film form a trilogy that, according toGranilshchikov, can be interpreted as "a reenactment of the everyday life of the noughties."

In 2015, Granilshchikov filmed To Follow Her Advice in Thailand It appeared at the 6th Moscow Biennale .

In 2016, the Multimedia Art Museum (Moscow) organized a solo show for Granilshchikov, Untitled (after defeats)/ It presented his polaroid series Untitled (accidental shots), videos Munich (2015), Empire (2016), and Ghost movie (2016). This exhibition entered the finals of the Kandinsky Prize in the category "Project of the Year."

In 2016, War (untitled), first screened as part of the show One Within The Other. Art of New and Old Media in the Age of High-speed Internet in the Moscow Museum of Contemporary Art, It was shortlisted in nomination "New Generation" of the Innovation Prize 2015.

Granilshchikov was represented on the inaugural Triennial of Russian Contemporary Art, organized by Garage Museum of Contemporary Art. His work appeared in the Common Language section, which featured "artists who work with the internationally spoken language of contemporary art in no need for translation."

== Filmography ==
- 2016 – The Ghost
- 2015 – To Follow Her Advice
- 2015 – Untitled (reenactment)
- 2015 – Unfinished Film
- 2014 – Courbet's Funeral

== Personal Shows ==
- 2016 – Untitled (after defeats), Multimedia Art Museum, Moscow – http://www.mamm-mdf.ru/exhibitions/evgr/
- 2014 — Something Will Be Lost, as part of the cycle High Hopes, Manege Central Exhibition Hall, Moscow – http://moscowmanege.ru/ru/granilshikov/

== Group Shows ==
- 2017 — Triennial of Russian Contemporary Art, Garage Museum of Contemporary Art, Moscow;
- 2016 – Exhibition of the nominees for the 11th Innovation Prize 2016, National Center for Contemporary Art, Moscow;
- 2016 – Experiences of the Imaginary, "New Holland: Cultural Urbanisation,” New Holland Island in St. Petersburg;
- 2016 – Moscow International Experimental Film Festival, Moscow;
- 2015 – How to Gather? Acting in a Center in a City in the Heart of the Island of Eurasia, as part of the main programme of the 6th Moscow Biennale, Central Pavilion of VDNKH, Moscow;
- 2015 – One Within the Other. Art of New and Old Media in the Age of High-speed Internet, Moscow Museum of Modern Art, Moscow;
- 2015 – XVI Media Forum of the Moscow International Film Festival, Moscow;
- 2015 – Alanica. The Experimental Method, Special Programme of the 6th Moscow Biennale of Contemporary Art;
- 2015 – Exhibition of the nominees for the 10th Innovation Prize 2015, National Center for Contemporary Art, Moscow;
- 2015 – Notation, Anniversary exhibition, Center of Creative Industries "Fabrika," Moscow
- 2015 – International Short Film Festival, Oberhausen, Germany;
- 2015 – Kino Der Kunst Festival, Munich, Germany;
- 2015 – goEast Festival of Central and Eastern European Film, Wiesbaden, Germany;
- 2015 – High Hopes, Final show in the cycle, Manege Central Exhibition Hall, Moscow;
- 2015 – Political Populism, Kunsthalle Wien, Vienna, Austria;
- 2015 – Boderlands, GRAD Gallery, London, UK;
- 2014 – Time for Dreams, the 4th Moscow International Biennale for Young Art, Moscow Museum, Moscow;
- 2014 – 11. Garage Museum of Contemporary Art, Moscow;
- 2014 – Burning News, Hayward Gallery, London, UK;
- 2013 – Kandinsky Art Prize Exhibition, Udarnik, Moscow;
- 2013 – Zero Gravity, Parallel programme of the 5th Moscow Biennale, Worker and Kolkhoz Woman, Moscow;
- 2013 – Stability. Ghosts, Random gallery, Moscow;
- 2013 – The Happy End, Exhibition of the Rodchenko School Alumni, Multimedia Art Museum, Moscow;
- 2013 – Rehearsal Time, Triumph Gallery, Moscow;
- 2012 – Unfinished Analysis, Special Project of the 3rd Moscow Young Art Biennale, Moscow Museum of Contemporary Art, Moscow;
- 2012 – Kandinsky Art Prize Exhibition, Udarnik, Moscow;
- 2012 – Show and Tell, Exhibition of the Rodchenko School Alumni, E. K. ArtBureau, Moscow;

== Media ==
- 2017 – "The Extent of Freedom. Interview with Evgeny Granilshchikov,”
- Arts Dialog the Journal of the Moscow Modern Museum of Art, January 2016.
- 2016 – "Top-10 +1 & 50: prominent young artists," The Artnewspaper Russia, No.45, July–August 2016.
- 2016 – "Something Personal Untitled. Interview with Evgeny Granilshchikov," arterritory.com.
- 2015 – "Evgeny Granilshchikov. Untitled," text by author, Arts Journal No.94.
- 2015 – "Evgeny Granilshchikov: ‘Screens are part of the landscape’,” seanse.ru.
- 2015 – "Challenge by Choice. Interview with Evgeny Granilshchikov," Arts Dialog the Journal of the Moscow Modern Museum of Art.
- 2015 – "Evgeny Granilshchikov. Untitled," aroundart.org.
- 2015 – "‘The History of Cinema is a Long Discussion of How to Make Art Democratic.’ Evgeny Granilshchikov on film as method and liberating intentions of the cinema," Theory and Practice.
- 2015 – "Key Artworks of 2014," aroundart.org.
- 2014 – "Interview with Evgeny Granilshchikov for the section ‘A Portrait of the Artist as a Young Man’," aroundart.org.
- 2014 – "Evgeny Granilshchikov. Until Sorrow Takes Over," aroundart.org.
- 2013 – "Evgeny Granilshchikov. Elusive Places," Arts Journal №90.
