= Olya Kroytor =

Russian contemporary artist

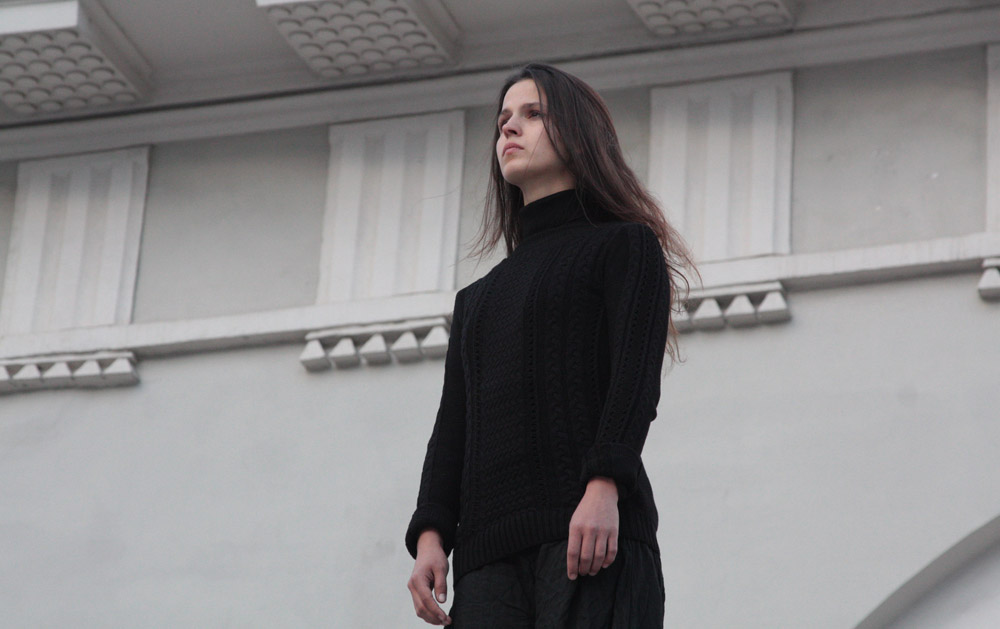
- Olya Kroytor during a performance in 2014
- Born: Olga Igorevna Kroytor; 21 April 1986 (age 40); Moscow, Russia
- Education: Institute of Contemporary Art (Moscow)
- Alma mater: Moscow Pedagogical State University
- Known for: Performance
- Style: Contemporary art
- Awards: Kandinsky Prize (2015)
- Website: olyakroytor.com

Olya Kroytor, full name Olga Igorevna Kroytor (Russian: Ольга Игоревна Кройтор, born 1986), is a Russian contemporary artist, based in Moscow. She works in the mediums of painting, collage, installation, sculpture, image manipulation and performance. She is particularly renowned for her performance pieces, receiving the Kandinsky Prize in 2015 in the category of 'Young artist: Project of the Year'.

== Biography ==
Born in 1986 in Moscow, she studied at Moscow State Pedagogical University in the Graphic Art Department (graduated in 2008) and the Institute of Contemporary Art (2009). Later she participated in Moscow Museum of Modern Art's programme «Free Workshops» (2007)

Olya Kroytor has shown her work in many different exhibitions, solo shows being «Unnecessary» (Komnata Gallery, Moscow, 2014),«Dissociative identity disorder» (Moscow Museum of Modern Art, Moscow, 2011), «Split personality» (Regina Gallery, Moscow, 2011), «Composition No1» (“Dvorets”, Saint Petersburg, 2010).

Her solo exhibition «Olya Kroytor. 8 Situations» inaugurated the opening of Artwin Gallery's space on Tverskoy Boulevard. Since then she has exhibited in Baku with «On The Other Side» (Kicik Qalart, 2015-2016) and in Moscow, «The Coordinates of Disappearance» (Artwin Gallery, Moscow, 2016).

In 2016 she was the recipient of a fellowship from the Joseph Brodsky Memorial Fund.

== Sources ==
- MMOMA exhibition (in Russian)
- «The Coordinates of Disappearance»
