= Evgeny Antufiev =

Russian artist

Evgeny Antufiev (Russian: Евгений Антуфьев; born 1986) is a Russian artist.

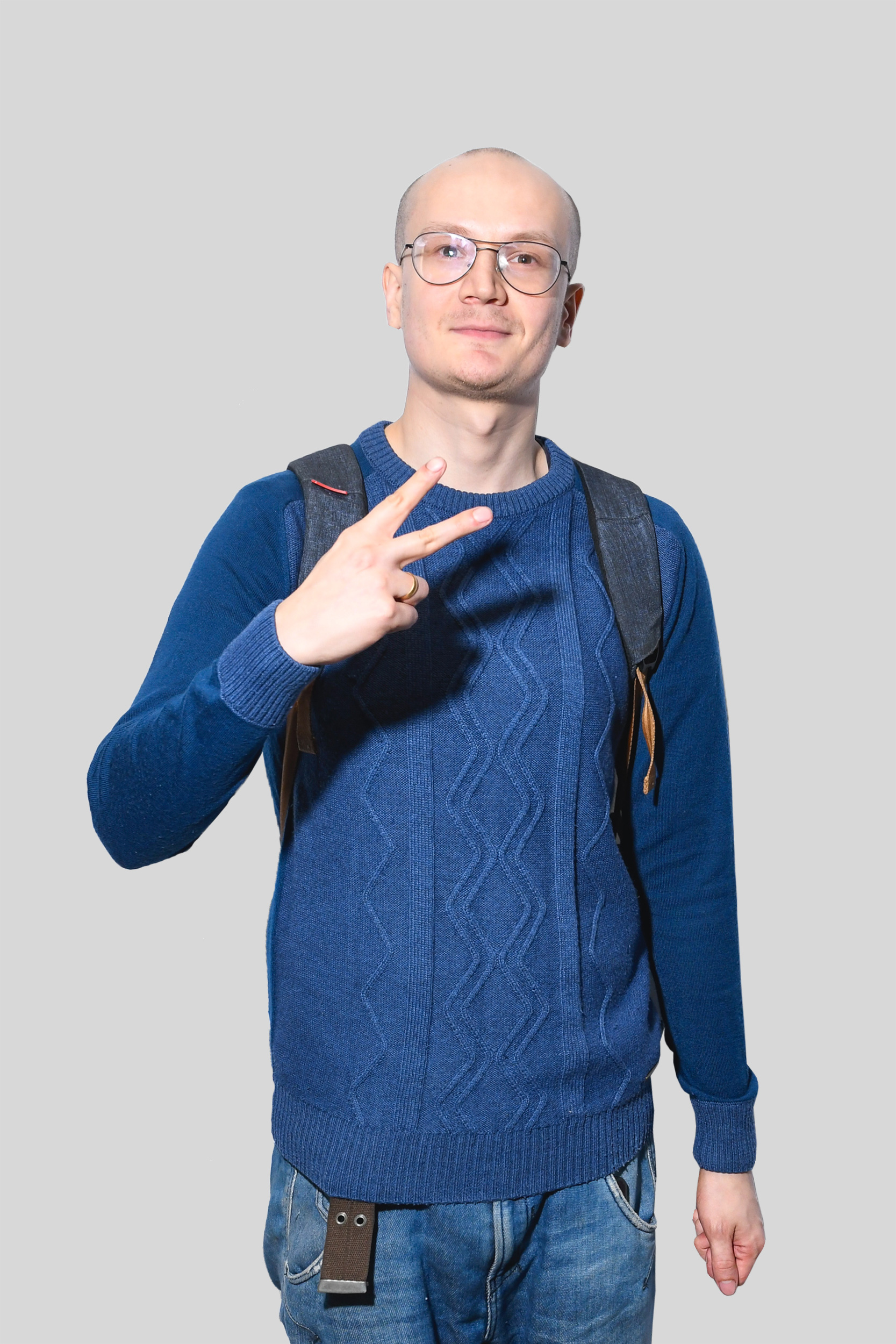

== Life and work ==
Born 1986 in Kyzyl (Tuva Republic), Antufiev graduated from the Institute of Contemporary Art (Moscow) in 2009. His artistic career began with the Objects of Protection solo exhibition, which took place on the Start Platform in Winzavod (Moscow) in late 2008 – early 2009. His debut show expressed Antufiev's key creative method and the primary topic in the focus of his practice: working with non-typical, ‘organic’ materials such as bones, hair, teeth, and skin, the artist contemplates the immortality of form and the transformation of content while making visual references to shamanic practices common in Tuva region, as well as to other archaic cultures.

In 2009 Antufiev took part in a number of group shows in Moscow and St. Petersburg: Needlework (PROUN Gallery, Moscow), The Space of Silence (The Red Flag Factory, St. Petersburg), and had his second solo exhibition Myths of My Childhood (Globe Gallery, ETAGI loft project, St. Petersburg). The same year Antufiev became the winner in the “Young artist. Project of the year” category of the Kandinsky Prize for his debut show, Objects of Protection. Well received by critics, he continued working in Moscow where Winzavod Contemporary Art Center provided him with a free studio, while Anton Belov's White Gallery project opened with the artist's installation Bones.

In 2011 the New Museum (New York, USA) held a group show Ostalgia, where Antufiev's works drew attention of collector and businessman Luigi Maramotti. He invited the artist to visit Italy, and later in 2013 Collezione Maramotti (Reggio Emilia, Italy) organized Antufiev's large-scale solo exhibition Twelve, wood, dolphin, knife, bowl, mask, crystal, marble and bones – fusion. Exploring materials. The show was partly reproduced in 2014 by Multimedia Art Museum (Moscow) as a special project of the 6th Moscow Biennale. In 2015-2016 Antufiev's solo exhibitions took place in Moscow and Rome: the Immortality Forever project (2015, MMOMA, Moscow), Seven Underground Kings, or a Brief Story of the Shadow (Regina Gallery, Moscow), Fusion and Absorption (2015, z2o Gallery, Rome), and Fragile Things (2016, Pechersky Gallery, Moscow).

In 2016 Evgeny Antufiev participated in the main project of Manifesta-11, the European biennale for contemporary art. The same year one of the leading media resources on contemporary art in Russia, Artguide Editions, ranked Antufiev first among the 20 most influential artists nationwide.

Apart from his individual practice, Antufiev also works as a curator, and since 2012 he has been coordinating Garage Museum's Program in support of emerging Russian artists. In 2014 he curated project 11 for Garage Museum's Project Space, presenting works by the first eleven recipients of the scholarship.

In 2015 Antufiev was announced as the winner of the Collecting Young Russian Art, V-A-C (Moscow)/M HKA (Antwerp) scheme, and he was also one of the award winners of Cosmoscow Contemporary Art Fair 2015 Patron Program in support of young Russian artists.

Antufiev lives and works in Moscow and Moscow region. His works can be found in various private and public collections: Collezione Maramotti (Reggio Emilia, Italy), Museum of Contemporary Art, Antwerp M HKA (Belgium), Moscow Museum of Modern Art, and Multimedia Art Museum, Moscow.

== Awards and prizes ==
- 2009 – Winner in the “Young artist. Project of the year” category, the Kandinsky Prize

== Personal exhibition ==
- 2018 – When Art Became Part of the Landscape. Chapter I. Salinas Regional Archaeological Museum, Palermo
- 2016 – Fragile Things, Pechersky Gallery, Winzavod, Moscow

== Group exhibitions ==
- 2016 – All Eyes On Me, Pechersky Gallery, Winzavod, Moscow
- 2016 – Cosmoscow Art Fair 2016, Gostiny Dvor, Moscow
- 2016 – Artissima Art Fair, Torino, Italy
- 2016 – Cabaret Kultura With V-A-C Live, Performance at Whitechapel Gallery, London, UK
- 2014 – Generation START, as part of the parallel program of Manifesta-10, St. Petersburg
- 2009 – Nominees of the Kandinsky Prize Show, Central House of Artist, Moscow
- 2009 – The Space of Silence, The Red Flag Factory, St. Petersburg

== Resources ==
- Evgeny Antufiev: Longing for the Myth by Yana Yukhalova on AroundArt/29.10.2015
- Selected articles from the catalogue published in support of Evgeny Antufiev’s show at Collezione Maramotti, February 2013
- Artist talk with Evgeny Antufiev and Taus Makhacheva
- Maria Kravtsova in an interview with Evgeny Antufiev
- Oblivion and Death Everywhere by Yulia Kulpina in Dialogue of Arts №6/2015
- “…Grown-ups are stronger but they are incapable of making magic…” by Andrey Misiano in Moscow Art Magazine №95/2015
- Evgeny Antufiev. Publisher: A+m Bookstore, 2013. - 150 p, ills colour & bw, Italian/English. ISBN 9788887071481
