= Anastasia Ryabova =

Russian contemporary artist

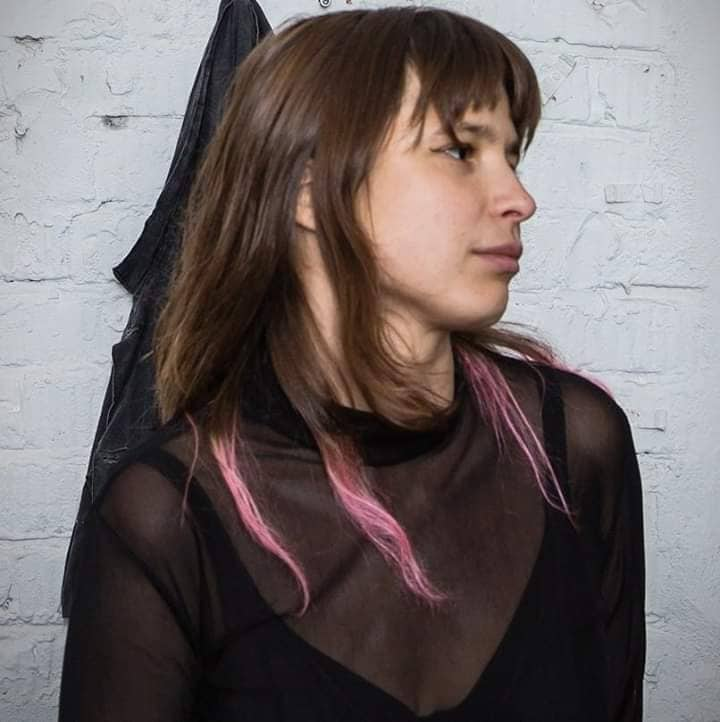
- Born: 1985 (age 40–41); Moscow, Russian SFSR, Soviet Union
- Known for: New media art, installation art, drawing
- Awards: Kandinsky Prize in media projects, 2011; Soratnik awards laureate, 2011
- Website: http://nastyaryabova.com

Anastasia Ryabova (Russian: Анастасия Рябова; born 1985) is a contemporary artist who won the 2011 Kandinsky Prize in media projects for her work, Artist's Private Collections, a virtual "museum of contemporary art based on artists' private collections". She is known for works that play "linguistic games". She was also the Soratnik awards laureate for 2011. Her art has been exhibited in Russia, Austria, Italy, Germany and the USA.

In 2015, she was included in the list of promising young artists of Russia according to Forbes, and in 2017 in the TOP 100 young authors according to InArt.

She holds a Master of Philosophy from the National Research University Higher School of Economics.

== Biography ==
Born in 1985 in Moscow. The creator of "Artist's Private Collections" is an online archive of works of contemporary art from private collections of artists. The site project "Artist's Private Collections" was carried out with the initial financial support of the Victoria Foundation and the Sandretto Re Rebaoudengo Foundation in the framework of the Russian-Italian exhibition Modernikon. One of the authors of the magazine.biz project, an online store where you can't buy anything (all products are painted by artists Alexei Buldakov, Alexandra Galkina, Alisa Yoffe, Zhanna Kadyrova, Viktor Makarov, Lena Martynova, Maxim Roganov, Anastasia Ryabova, David Ter-Oganyanom and Olga Chtak).

In 2011, she was twice nominated for the Kandinsky Prize. For the prize of the young artist of the year, Anastasia Ryabova put on the plastic work "Where is your banner, dude?", And for the prize "Project of the year in the field of media art" - her own no-art project "Artist's Private Collections". As a result, the artist won the second nomination and became the only woman to receive the Kandinsky Prize in the nomination "Project of the Year in the Field of Media Art".

In 2011, she carried out the project "Artist's Ride Space", arranging on her own bicycle, in a small "window" under the wheel, an art gallery of one work. During the year, the works of Alice Yoffe, Alexei Buldakov, Valery Chtak and other artists were exhibited there.

In 2012, with the support of the Victoria Foundation, it launched The False Calculations Presidium project. The exhibition was held in a non-standard place for Moscow - in the Museum of entrepreneurs, philanthropists and benefactors.

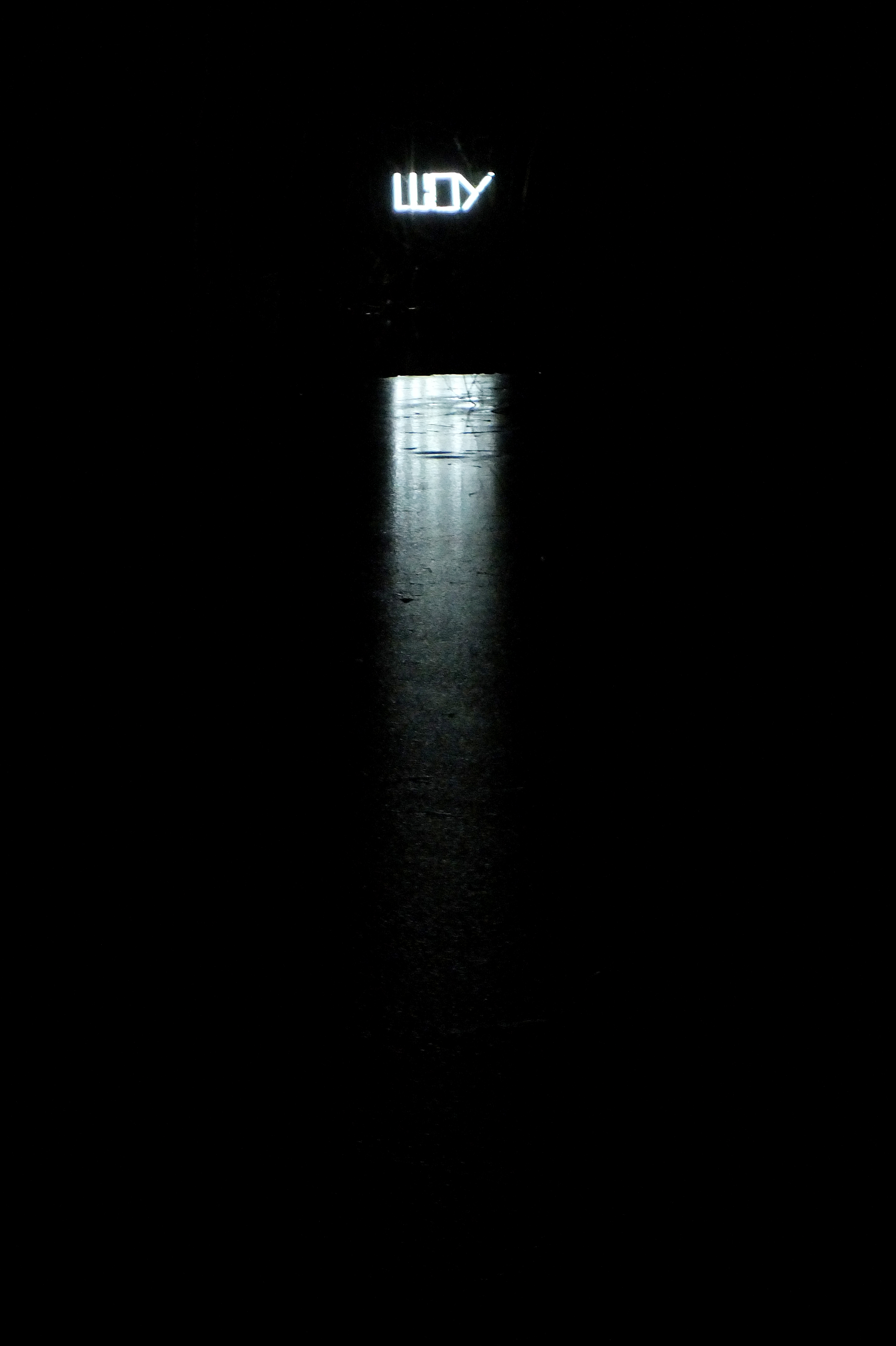
Night Movement "SHOW". 2019

Since 2015 Ryabova has been a founding member of the Night Movement "which is a series of events in the genre of relational aesthetics. Being a voluntary organizational network moderated by its founders, the "Night Movement" is a specially organized process, orchestrated according to one scenario or another."

In 2021 author of the geometric "Route H^{3}" of the V-A-C fund for the "Museum Four" project.

== List of exhibitions ==
=== Personal shows ===
- JDOO ILI DOO (shared with Marianna Abovyan), Institute of Fossil Fuels, Moscow, 2021
- Discord Show / Sticker packs, Work More! Rest More!, Online, Minsk, 2020
- + (+++), FFTN, Saint-Petersburg, 2019
- From Your Morning to My Night, Zarya AiR studio, Vladivostok, 2019
- Candy and toffee on the edge of feud or where to find four mistakes?, The Foundation of Vladimir Smirnov and Konstantine Sorokin, Moscow, 2017
- Candy and toffee on the edge of feud or where to find four mistakes?, Academy of Fine Arts, Tasku-galleria Näyttely, Helsinki, 2016
- Reverse Motion Inventory, Triangle Curatorial Studio, Moscow, 2015
- Star Tonnel, Banka Gallery, Moscow, 2013
- Billion (shared with A. Buldakov), Cultural Center Art Propaganda, Samara, 2011
- artistsprivatecollections.org (as part of the "Top" project), ARCOmadrid, Madrid, 2011
- Annual Report, As part of the parallel program of the art fair COSMOSCOW, Moscow, 2010
- It Works!. Brown Stripe Gallery, Moscow, 2010
- TrolleyTram&Transp! (Jointly with M. Roganov). LabGarage Gallery, Kyev, 2009
- Crowds of angry cunts, FABRIKA Project, Moscow, 2006

=== Group shows ===
- Salute, SPHERE Contemporary Art Foundation, Moscow, 2021
- Neoinfantilism, DK Gromov, Saint Petersburg, 2020
- Infographics, Cube.Moscow, Moscow, 2019
- VII PERMANENT COLLECTION, Moscow Museum of Modern Art, Moscow, 2016
- Metageography. Space — Image — Action, Tretyakov Gallery, Moscow, 2015
- Vertical Reach, Artspace, New Haven, 2015.
- Referendum on withdrawal from the human race, Teatr Powszechny, Warsaw, 2014
- Weightlessness, National Centre for Contemporary Arts, Nizhny Novgorod, 2013
- 5th Moscow Biennale of Contemporary Art - Presented a piece "Your Money Works No More Here", Moscow, 2013
- The Compromise Unidee in residence final expedition, Arte al Centro, Biella, 2013
- Toasting the Revolution, Family Business, New York, 2012
- 4th Moscow Biennale of Contemporary Art, Moscow, 2011
- Modernikon Palazzio, Casa dei Tre Oci, Venice, 2011
- Modernikon, Fondazione Sandretto Re Rebaudengo, Turin, 2010
- TAPE IT!, Centre D'art Contemporain "OUI", Grenoble, 2010
- Moscou dans la valise, Les Salaisons Romainville, Paris, 2010
- Policy in streets!, FABRIKA Project, Moscow, 2008

== Curatorial projects ==
- The False Calculations Presidium, Museum of Entrepreneurs, Patrons and Philanthropists, Moscow, 2012
- Artists' Ride Space, Moscow, 2011

== Collections ==
- Museum Garage, Moscow
- Gazprombank, Moscow
- V-A-C Foundation, Moscow
- Moscow Museum of Modern Art, Moscow
- Zarya Foundation, Vladivostok
