= Roman Sakin =

Russian sculptor (born 1976)

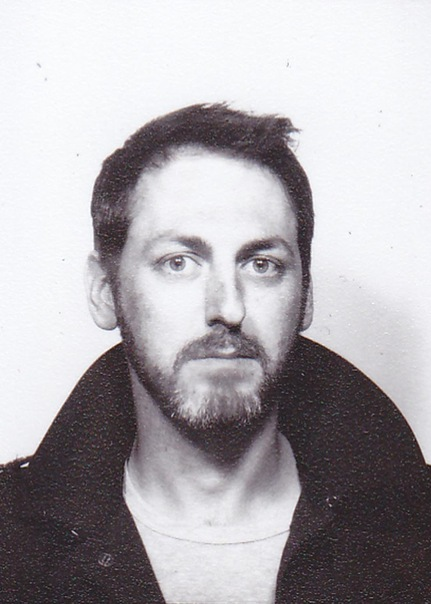
- Sakin in 2011
- Born: Roman Ilyich Sakin; 17 March 1976 (age 49); Kursk
- Education: AHPK im. V.M.Vasnetsova; Stroganov Moscow State University of Arts and Industry
- Known for: Sculpture
- Awards: The nominee of the Kandinsky Prize 2009; The nominee of the Kandinsky Prize 2012

Roman Sakin (Russian: Роман Сакин; born 17 March 1976) is a Russian sculptor. He lives and works in Moscow.

== Biography ==
Sakin was born on 17 March 1976 in Kursk, Russia. Having graduated from V.M.Vasnetsov Art and Industry College in 1997, he graduated from the Department of Monumental-Decorative Sculpture at Stroganov Moscow State University of Arts and Industry in 2005. In 2009 he was nominated for the Kandinsky Prize in "Media Art Project of the Year" with project "Les". In 2012 he was nominated for the Kandinsky Prize in "Media Art Project of the Year" with project "Master 3-go razryada".

== Selected collections ==
- ART4.RU Contemporary Art Museum, Moscow
- Spazio Carbonesi, Bologna
- Moscow Museum of Modern Art

== Solo exhibitions ==
- 2007 — «K.B.-1». Art Strelka Gallery, Moscow.
- 2008 — «Les». Moscow Museum of Modern Art, Moscow.
- 2011 — «Master 3-go razryada». Marat Guelman Gallery, Moscow.
- 2014 — «School Of Athens». Pechersky Gallery, Moscow.

== Group exhibitions ==
- 2005 — 2007 — «Masterskaja». Moscow Museum of Modern Art, Moscow.
- 2008 — «Opyt 1». LABORATORIA Art&Science Space, Moscow.
- 2009 — «Kandinsky Prize». Central House of Artists, Moscow.
- 2009 — «Cliche». Moscow Museum of Modern Art, Moscow.
- 2009 — «10 years of the Moscow Museum of Modern Art. 1989-2009 Russian art from the museum's collection». Moscow Museum of Modern Art, Moscow.
- 2010 — «Erased Walls». ZAMEK, Poznań. Freies Museum Berlin, Berlin. SPACE, Bratislava.
- 2010 — «New Formalism». City Sculpture Museum, Saint Petersburg.
- 2011 — «Imperfetto». Spazio Carbonesi, Bologna.
- 2011 — «Freedom». Spazio Carbonesi, Bologna.
- 2011 — «Nuzhnoe Iskusstvo». Gorky Central Park of Culture and Leisure, Moscow.
- 2012 — «Pyl». LABORATORIA Art&Science Space, Moscow.
- 2012 — «Kandinsky Prize». “Udarnik” cinema, Moscow.
