= Katerina Belkina =

Russian contemporary painter

- Katerina Belkina
- Born: 16 April 1974 (age 52); Kuibyshev, Samara, Russia
- Occupations: photographer and painter
- Website: belkina.art

Katerina Belkina (Russian: Катерина Белкина; born 1974, Samara, Russia) is a Russian contemporary pictoralist photographer and painter. She digitally manipulates many of her photographs to appear as paintings, and often uses herself as the model in her work.

== Life ==
Belkina grew up in an artistic family. Her mother was also an artist. From 1989 Belkina studied at the Art School and the Petrow-Vodkin art academy in Samara. From 1994 to 1999 she worked at the publishing house Fedorow in Samara. In 2000 she started to study at the Michael-Musorin school for photography in her hometown where she studied till 2002. At the same time she worked as a computer graphic designer at a Russian television channel.

In 2007, Belkina was nominated for the Russian Kandinsky Prize. In 2009/2010 she was at the 1st Photo Biennale of the Russian Museum at the Marble Palace in St. Petersburg. In 2011, she was in the framework of the Fourth Moscow Biennale of Contemporary Art, an exhibition curated by Tatiana Kurtanova. In 2015, she was awarded the International Lucas-Cranach-Preis. In 2016, she won the Hasselblad Masters’ Competition with a self-portrait as a pregnant woman.

Belkina is a member of the Union of Russian Photographers.

== Work ==
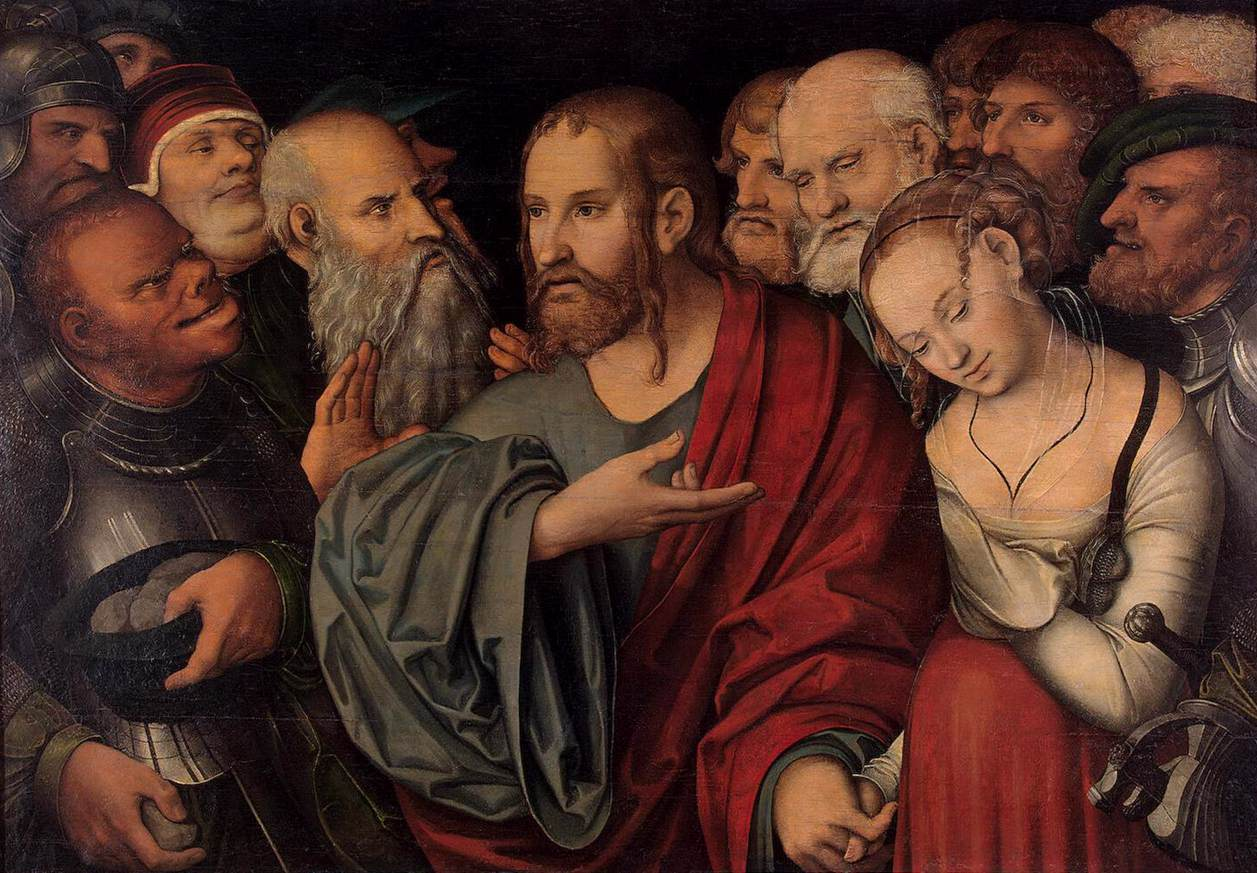
Lucas Cranach d. J. – Christ and the Woman Taken in Adultery served as a model for The Sinner.

Belkina's photographic work is strongly influenced by the painting. It focuses entirely on portraits. In recent years she mainly focused on staged self-portraits. The series "Paint" combined picturesque and photographic elements and reinterpreted paintings by famous painters. The series "Hieroglyph" consists of body fragments, processed for a collage. The series "Empty Spaces" was created in 2010/11. Here she staged herself in a chilly style in front of urban skylines. Her artworks were published, for example, in Photo Art, Twill, Kunstbeeld.NL, Eyemazing, the Monthly Art Magazine, Fine Art Photo, Zebra, National Geographic and in the Russian Gala, Photo Biennale of the Russian Museum.

== Awards ==
- 2007: Kandinsky Prize, Moscow (nomination for "Project of the Year")
- 2012: IPA International Photography Awards, Los Angeles (1st place in the categories "Fine Art, Collage", "Fine Art, Portrait", "People, Self-Portrait" and "Special, Digitally Enhanced")
- 2015: International Lucas-Cranach-Preis of the Cranach-Foundation (1st place)
- 2016: Hasselblad Masters Award (1st place in the category "Art")

== Selected exhibitions ==
=== Solo ===
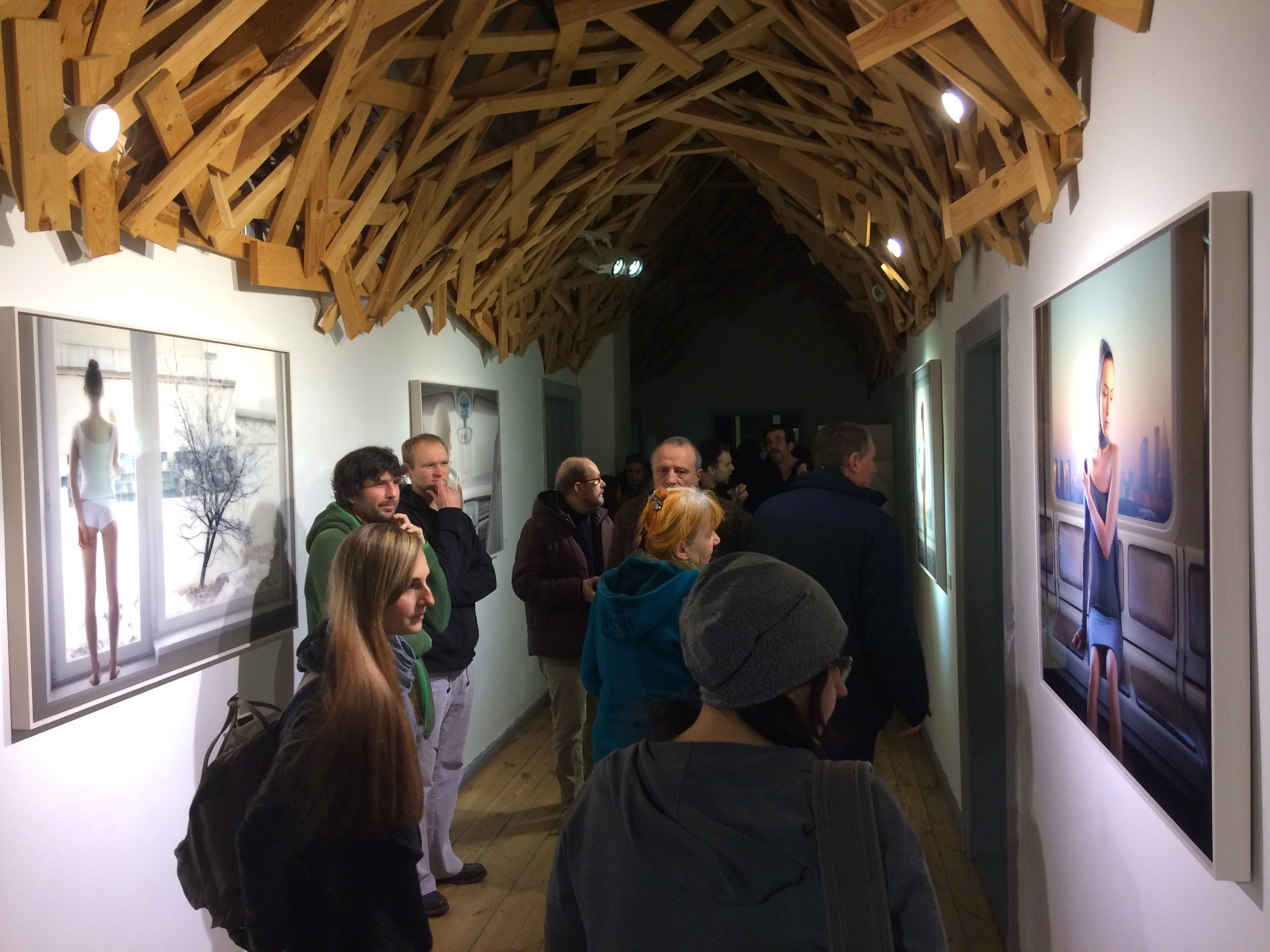
Solo Exhibition at Direktorenhaus – Museum for Art Crafts Design, Berlin

- 2014: Empty Spaces, Duncan Miller Gallery, Santa Monica, US
- 2015: The Sinner, Being 3 Gallery, Beijing, China
- 2015: Revival, Galerie Lilja Zakirova, Heusden, Netherlands
- 2016: Humanism, CreArte Studio, Oderzo, Italy
- 2016" Paint, Faur Zsófi Gallery, Budapest, Hungary
- 2017: Repast, Till Richter Museum, Buggenhagen, Germany
- 2017: Katerina Belkina, Direktorenhaus – Museum for Art Crafts Design, Berlin, Germany
- 2018: Katerina Belkina, GalerieKanzlei im Kunstareal, Munich, Germany

=== Group ===
- 2009: 1st Photo Biennale of the Russian Museum, Marble Palace, Saint Petersburg, Russia
- 2010: Russian Tales, EXPRMNTL Gallery, Toulouse, France
- 2012: Madre Russia, Museo Civico, Asolo, Italy
- 2015: Humble me, aeroplastics contemporary, Brussels, Belgium
- 2015: Cranach und die Moderne, Stiftung Christliche Kunst Wittenberg, Lutherstadt Wittenberg, Germany
- 2015: Cranach 2.0, Cranach-Stiftung Wittenberg, Lutherstadt Wittenberg, Germany
- 2016: Beyond the boundaries, Faur Zsófi Gallery, Budapest, Hungary
- 2016: PhotograpHER – women taking photos of women, Spazio Contemporanea, Brescia, Italy
- 2016: error: x, OSTRALE Centre for Contemporary Art, Dresden, Germany
- 2016: Until It Turns Slightly Pink..., C.A.M Gallery, Istanbul, Turkey
- 2017: CRANACH. Meister – Marke – Moderne, Museum Kunstpalast Düsseldorf, Germany
- 2017: HUMAN/DIGITAL: a symbiotic love affair, Kunsthal Rotterdam, Netherlands
- 2017: Nature Morte. Contemporary Artists Revive the Still Life, National Museum, Wrocław, Poland
- 2017: Denn durch die Liebe wird der Mensch besser, Stiftung Christliche Kunst Wittenberg, Germany
- 2017: so weit – so gut, Kunsthalle Erfurt, Germany

== Publications ==
- My Work Is My Personal Theatre. Shift Books, Berlin 2020, ISBN 978-3-948174-05-7
