= Kandinsky Prize =

Arts award

- Country: Russia
- Presented by: Deutsche Bank
- First award: 2007
- Website: kandinskyprize.org

The Kandinsky Prize, named after Russian painter Wassily Kandinsky is an award sponsored by the Deutsche Bank AG and the Art Chronika Culture Foundation. It was organized in hopes of developing Russian contemporary art, and to reinforce the status of Russian art within the world. In total, €55,000 are awarded to the artists.

It was first given out on 4 December 2007, hosted at the Winzavod Contemporary Art Center in Moscow. Four awards were given. The Young Artist Category is awarded to an artist under 30 and they receive a three months stay in Villa Romana. New Media Project of the year is awarded 10,000 euros. Artist of the Year is awarded 40,000 euros. Audience's Prize is awarded 5,000 euros.

The award has been evolving over the years. "One of the distinctive features of the prize is that artists are able to nominate themselves." Now the categories are 'Project of the Year', 'Young Artist. Project of the Year' and 'Scholarly Work. History and Theory of Contemporary Art'. Every year the venue changes, the finalists' projects being shown in different cities.

== Background ==
On 20 September 2007 Deutsche Bank and ArtChronika presented their nominations of over 250 names for the Kandinsky Prize in a press conference. Their work was displayed in exhibitions at Moscow's Central House of Artist and in St. Petersburg. It was eventually cut down to 50. The winners were announced in December. The objective is to promote contemporary Russian art and to offer insights into the art scene's most important trends and perspective.

"This is a natural progression. In the last two years, we have had the Biennale, art fairs and many exhibitions. With all these events, there comes growth in numbers of art critics, art investors, art foundations and institutes, and so we decided there should also be an art prize," Nikolai Molok, the editor of ArtKhronika.

== Kandinsky Prize 2007 ==
=== Jury ===
Jean-Hubert Martin, Valerie Higgins, and Andrey Yerofeyev.

=== Nomination ===
==== Project of the Year ====
Anatoly Osmolovsky, AES+F, Yuri Albert, Yuri Avvakumov, Katerina Belkina, Alexander Vinogradov and Vladimir Dubossarsky, Dmitri Vrubel and Victoria Timofeeva, Dmitry Gutov, Larisa Zvezdochetova, Alain Kirtsova, Vitaly Kopachev, Oleg Kulik, Konstantin Latyshev, Anton Litvin, Rauf Mamedov, Irina Nakhova, Nikola Ovchinnikov, George Pervov, Alexei Politov and Marina Belova, Alexander Sauko, Sergei Saigon, Sumnina Maria, Olga and Alexander Florensky, Gor Chahal, Yuri Shabelnikov, Evgeny Semyonov (2010, Living Mathematics).

==== Young Artist (aged up to 30) ====
Vladlena Gromova, Catherine Belyavskaya, Lyoha Garikovich, Peter Goloshapov, Bashir Borlakov, Ekaterina Gavrilova and Petr Zhukov, Oleg Dou, Diana Machulina, Alexei Stepanov, Sergei Uryvaev and Alexei Stepanov, Gregory Yushenko.

==== Media Art Project of the Year ====
Vladislav Mamyshev Monroe, Anton Litvin, Vladimir Logutov, Alexei Buldakov and Petr Bystrov, Philip Dontcov, Oleg Kulik, Provmyza Victor Freudenberg, Marina Chernikov, Aristarchus Chernyshev.

=== Winners ===
- Young Artist (aged up to 30) — Vladlena Gromova
- Media Art Project of the Year — Vladislav Mamyshev-Monroe
- Artist of the Year — Anatoly Osmolovsky
- People's Choice Award — Peter Goloschapov

== Kandinsky Prize 2008 ==
=== Jury ===
Jean-Hubert Martin, Valerie Higgins, Andrei Erofeev, Friedhelm Hütte, Catherine Bobrinskaya, Alexander Borovsky

=== Nomination ===
==== Project of the Year ====
Alexey Belyaev-Gintovt, Dmitry Gutov, Boris Orlov, Victor Alimpiev, Peter White, Alexander Vertinsky, Sergei Vorontsov, Dmitri Vrubel and Victoria Timofeeva, group "Blue Noses", Olga Stone, Sergei Kostrikov, Gregory Maiofis Bogdan Mamonov, Boris Markovnikov, Diana Machulina, Rosedkin, Vincent Nilin and Dmitri Prigov, George Pervov, Igor Pestov, George Pusenkoff, Vitaly Pushnitsky, Kerim Ragimov, Leonid Rotar, Aidan Salakhova, Sergey Skachkov, Marina Fedorova, Galina Hailu, Dmitry Tsvetkov, Sergey Chilikov, Sergey Shekhovtsov.

==== Young Artist (aged up to 30) ====
Diana Machulina, Anna Gholud, Grigory Yushchenko, 3 ART, MAKE, Andrei Blokhin and Georgy Kuznetsov, Ilya Gaponov and Cyril Koteshov, Alexander Gronskiy, Alina Gutkina, Oleg Dou, Alexander Klymtsov, Lera Matveeva, Misha Most, Nikolai Rykunov, Anna Titova.

==== Media Art Project of the Year ====
Group "PG", Vladimir Logutov, Group "Blue Soup", Maria Andre, Hope Anfalova, Vladlen Gromov, Marina Zvyagintsev, Anton Litvin, Ksenia Peretrukhina, Group PROVMYZA, Programme ESCAPE, Thanatos Banionis, Alexander von Busch, Svetlana Hansemann, Marina Chernikov.

=== Winners ===
- Young Artist (aged up to 30) — Diana Machulina
- Media Art Project of the Year — PG Group (Ilya Falkovsky, Alexey Katalkin and Boris Spiridonov)
- Project of the Year — Alexey Belyaev-Gintovt

== Kandinsky Prize 2009 ==
=== Nomination ===
==== Project of the Year ====
Konstantin Batynkov, Peter White, Vita Buivid, Alexei Garikovich, Dmitry Gretzky, Alla Esipovich, Vadim Zakharov, Vladimir Kozin, Irina Korina, Rostislav Lebedev, Gregory Maiofis, Igor Moukhin, Nikolay Nasedkin, Arkady Nasonov, Pavel Pepperstein, Nikolay Polissky, Roman Sakin, Semen Fajbisovich, Natalia Khlebtsevich, Anastasia Horoshilova, Dmitry Tsvetkov, Cyril Chelushkin, Dmitry Shorin, Sergei Shutov.

==== Young Artist ====
Eugene Antufiev, Lyoha Garikovich, Ivan Lungin, Stepan Subbotin, Dmitry Teselkin, Alexander Frolov, ART 3, Makeev, Milk & Vodka, Recycle.

==== Media Art Project of the Year ====
Thanatos Banionis, Julia and Alexander Devlyashova Toschevikova, Alexandra Dementieva, Vadim Zakharov, Marina Zvyagintsev, Elena Kovylina Alexander Lavrov, Alexei Politov and Marina Belova PROVMYZA Olga Tobreluts and Dmitry Sokolenko, Aristarch Chernyshev and Alexei Shulgin.

=== Winners ===
- Young Artist (aged up to 30) — Evgeny Antufiev
- Media Art Project of the Year — Electroboutique (Aristarkh Chernyshev and Alexey Shulgin)
- Project of the Year — Vadim Zakharov

== Kandinsky Prize 2010 ==
=== Winners ===
- Young Artist — Taisia Korotkova for Reproduction (2009), Recycle (Andrei Blokhin and Georgy Kuznetsov) for Reverse
- Media Art Project of the Year — Andrei Blazhnov for Cost?
- Project of the Year — Alexander Brodsky for The Road. Evgany Semyonov "Living Mathematics".

== Kandinsky Prize 2011 ==
=== Winners ===
- Young Artist — Polina Kanis for Eggs
- Media Art Project of the Year — Anastasia Ryabova for Artists' Private Collections
- Artist of the Year — Yuri Albert for Moscow Poll

== Kandinsky Prize 2012 ==
=== Nomination ===
- Art Collective Pussy riot was nominated, but not included on the shortlist, causing a number of nominees to retract their names in protest.

=== Winners ===
- Young Artist — Dmitry Venkov for Mad Mimes
- Main category — Grisha Bruskin for H-HOUR Sculpture project and AES+F Allegoria Sacra

== Kandinsky Prize 2013 ==
=== Winners ===
- Young Artist — Evgeny Granilshchikov for Positions and Tim Parchikov Times New Roman Episode III: Moscow
- Main category — Irina Nakhova for The project Untitled

== Kandinsky Prize 2014 ==
=== Winners ===
- Young Artist — Albert Soldatov for the project Baltus
- Main category — Pavel Pepperstein for the project Holy Politics
- Scholarly Work. History and Theory of Contemporary Art — Mihail Yampolskii for the work Gnosis in Images

== Kandinsky Prize 2015 ==
=== Winners ===
- Young Artist — Olya Kroytor for the project Fulcrum
- Project of the Year —Filippov Andrey for the project The Wheel in the Head
- Scholarly Work. History and Theory of Contemporary Art – Podoroga Valeriy for the project The Second Screen: S. Eisenstein and the Cinematography of Violence

== Kandinsky Prize 2016 ==
=== Winners ===
- Young Artist — Super Taus
- Project of the Year — Andrey Kuzkin
- Scholarly Work. History and Theory of Contemporary Art — Victor Misiano

== Kandinsky Prize 2017 ==
=== Winners ===
- Young Artist — Sasha Pirogova
- Project of the Year — ZIP Grouping
- Scholarly Work. History and Theory of Contemporary Art — Alexander Borovsky

== Kandinsky Prize 2019 ==
=== Winners ===
- Young Artist — Albina Mokryakova
- Project of the Year — Evgeny Antufiev
- Scholarly Work. History and Theory of Contemporary Art – Andrey Khlobystin

== Kandinsky Prize 2021 ==
=== Winners ===
- Young Artist – Albina Mokryakova
- Project of the Year – Andrey Kuzkin
- Scholarly Work. History and Theory of Contemporary Art – Roman Osminkin

== See also ==
- Turner Prize
