= Vita Buivid =

Ukrainian Russian artist and photographer (born 1962)

- Born: Victoria Buivid; 11 May 1962 (age 64); Dnepropetrovsk, Ukrainian SSR, Soviet Union (now Ukraine)
- Education: Dutch Art Institute (ArtEZ University of Arts), Dnepropetrovsk State University
- Known for: contemporary art, photography, lens-based media

Vita Buivid (born Victoria Buivid; born 1962) is a contemporary artist and photographer living in Amsterdam.

Buivid graduated from the Dutch Art Institute (ArtEZ University of Arts), and was a resident at the Rijksakademie van Beeldende Kunsten in 2023

Buivid, started working with animation and painting, after graduation from the Dnepropetrovsk State University in 1988. She moved to Leningrad (now St. Petersburg, Russia), and later to Moscow, and to the Netherlands.

== Life ==
Vita was born in Dnepropetrovsk, USSR, now Ukraine. Buivid has been engaged in contemporary art since the late 1980s, initially photography and photo-based art. In the early 1990s, she began to add to her work watercolour, oil, textiles and collage, not limited by pure print.

Since 1990 she has taken part in numerous exhibitions worldwide. In 1994, Vita received a grant from the CIRC Foundation promoting cultural exchange between Russia and the Netherlands and worked on a project regarding the influence of Dutch art on Russian culture. With support from Rutgers University, she travelled to New York to work on a photo project, and also was influenced by fashion photography and started to work with local fashion magazines on her return to Russia. In 2000, Vita received a grant from la Mairie de Paris and spent two months at the Cité internationale des arts residence working on project «Paris. Red» and produced a limited edition artist book.

In 1990s - 2000s Vita Buivid was considered to be one of the forward-thinking feminists in Russian art. The most notable project in past years have been a series «How I Spent My Summer», nominated for a Kandinsky Prize in 2009, colliding the collage images of peaceful relaxation with a military invasion, and «Peonymania», 2013. Both projects are based on carefully guarded family history, discovered and interpreted by the artist.

== Exhibitions ==
=== Selected solo shows ===
- 2022 – TEXT/TEXTILE; not (too) old/ not (too) you young, Hotel Maria Kapel, Hoorn
- 2017 – Fragments, RuArts gallery, Moscow
- 2017 – Family portrait in an Interior, We-Fest, Urban culture centrum, Perm, Russia
- 2016 – My Love Is Not a Wisp of Smoke, Moscow Museum of Modern Art
- 2013 – Peonymania, RuArts gallery, Moscow
- 2013 – Reservoir Dogs, AL gallery, St. Petersburg
- 2013 – Act of civil status, Karas gallery, Kiev
- 2011 – Workdays, Museum of the History of Photography, St. Petersburg
- 2010 – Love me as I love you, Karas gallery, Kiev
- 2008 – How I Spent My Summer, ARTStrelka projects gallery, Moscow
- 2007 – Photo-knitwear, “Fashion and Style in Photography" Biennale, Moscow Museum of Modern Art
- 2006 – Familia, Freud Dream Museum, St. Petersburg

=== My love is not a wisp of smoke, 2016 – retrospective ===
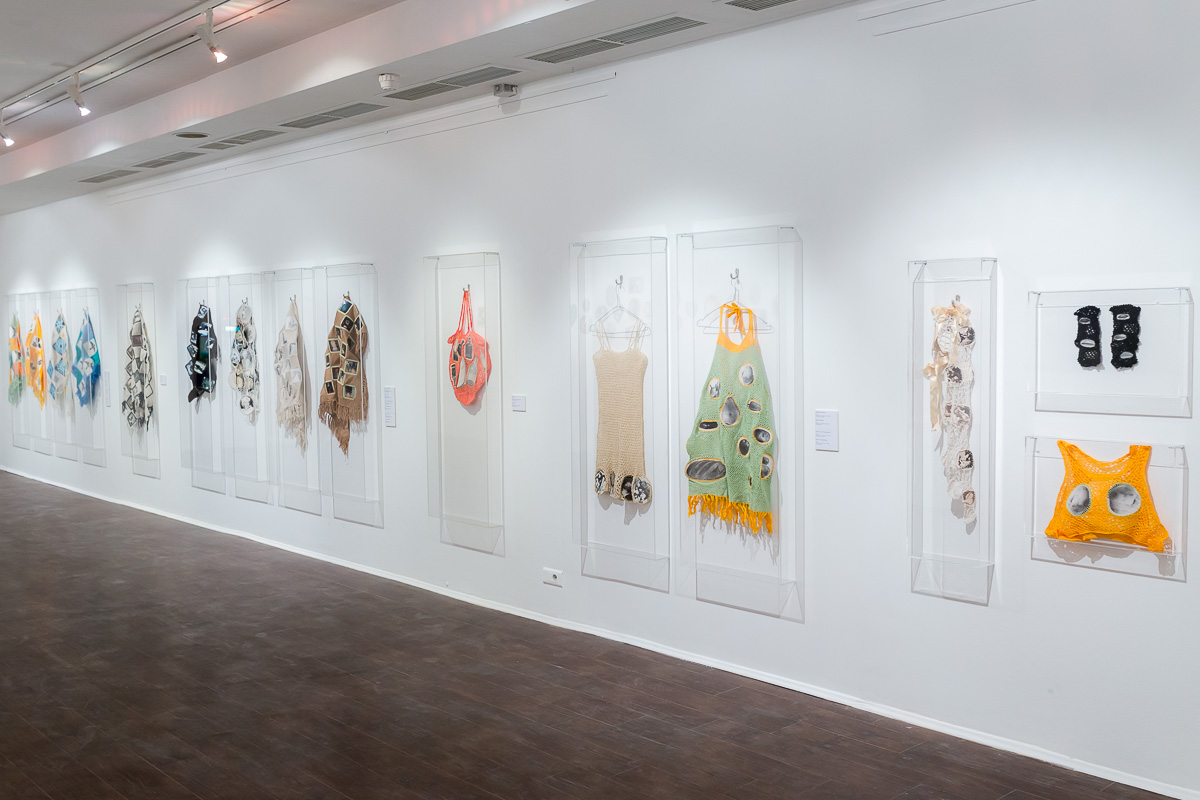
Vita Buivid's retrospective at Moscow Museum of Modern Art, 2016 – exhibition view

In 2016 Moscow Museum of Modern Art and RuArts Foundation of Contemporary Art presented the first Vita Buivid's retrospective show. The project occupied five floors of the museum venue on Ermolaevsky, 17 and contained projects, created by the author from the early 1990s till the present time. It is the first time when the oeuvre of the artist is presented in such a full. The works by the artist can be attributed to the photo-based art. However, every time the artist manages to expand the borders of the genre. In her artworks, the aesthetics are united with the expressive and unfinished «democratic» photography. However, this form is filled with the in-depth content of different levels of perception. Each series by the artist is a social and cultural narrative, revealing details of the bohemian lifestyle, family conflicts, personal experiences, which turns into large-scale research, able to move the audience from the emotional maturity to existential.

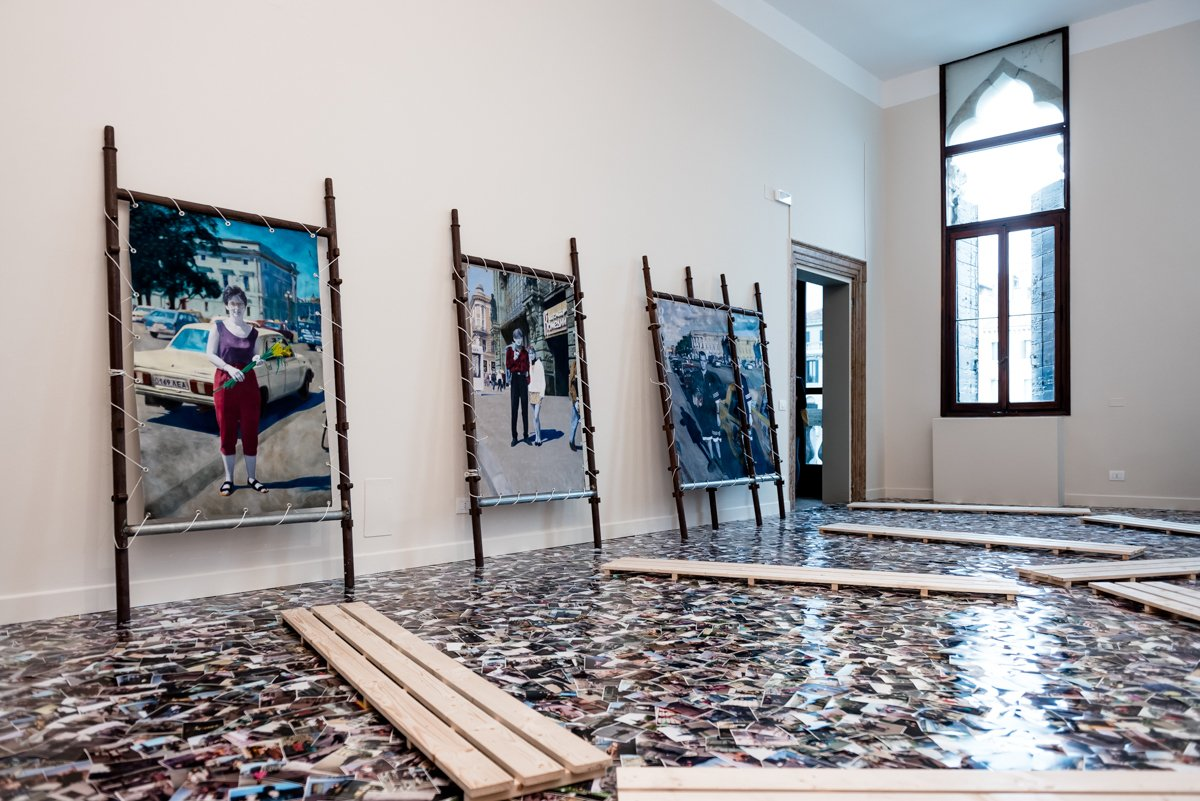
Vita Buivid, installation Nevsky Ave at the Personal Structures group show at Palazzo Bembo, Venice, 2017

=== Selected group shows ===
- 2023 – Galatea Kunstprijs, Dordrechts Museum
- 2018 – Women at Work: Subverting the Feminine in Post-Soviet Russia, White Space Gallery, London
- 2017 – Personal Structures, European Cultural center, Palazzo Bembo, Venice
- 2017 – Too Much as Not Enough, Shtager gallery, London
- 2016 – Sfumato, Arkaniya Gallery, Tbilisi, Georgia
- 2015 – WAR/SHE, Kharkov, Ukraine
- 2014 – Ukrainian Landscape, Mystetskyi Arsenal, Kiev
- 2013 – Dinner is Served, The State Russian Museum, St. Petersburg
- 2013 – ARCHSTOYANIE, Land art festival, Kaluzhskaya Oblast, Russia
- 2012 – Anonymous, Perm Museum of Contemporary Art (PERMM), Russia
- 2012 – FotoFest 2012 Biennial: Contemporary Russian Photography, Houston, TX, USA
- 2012 – Straight Look – Contemporary photography from Eastern Europe, pop/off/art gallery, Berlin
- 2011 – INDEPENDENT: new art of the new country 1991–2011, Mystetskyi Arsenal, Kiev
- 2010 – ŽEN d’АRТ. The Gender History of Art in the Post-Soviet Space: 1989–2009, Moscow Museum of Modern Art

== Awards and collections ==
Buivid was shortlisted for Kandinsky Prize in 2009 and 2017 and Sergey Kuryokhin Modern Art Award in 2012 and 2013.

Artists' works are in private and museum collections, such as: Moscow House of Photography; The State Russian Museum, St. Petersburg; RuArts Foundation, Moscow; Museum of Contemporary Art Kiasma, Helsinki; The Forbes Collection, Navigator foundation, Boston; Mőlndal commun collection, Sweden; Harry Ransom Center at the University of Texas, Austin and others.

Some of Buivid's artworks already on a secondary art market and presented by leading auction houses, including Sotheby's, Bonhams and Vladey

== Name transcriptions ==
Artists' name Vita Buivid has been variously transcript from Cyrillic (Вита Буйвид), and the last name can also be spelt as Buyvid, Bujvid or Bouivid; while first name variations include Victoria or Viktoria; and possible combinations of above
