= Irina Korina =

Russian installation artist

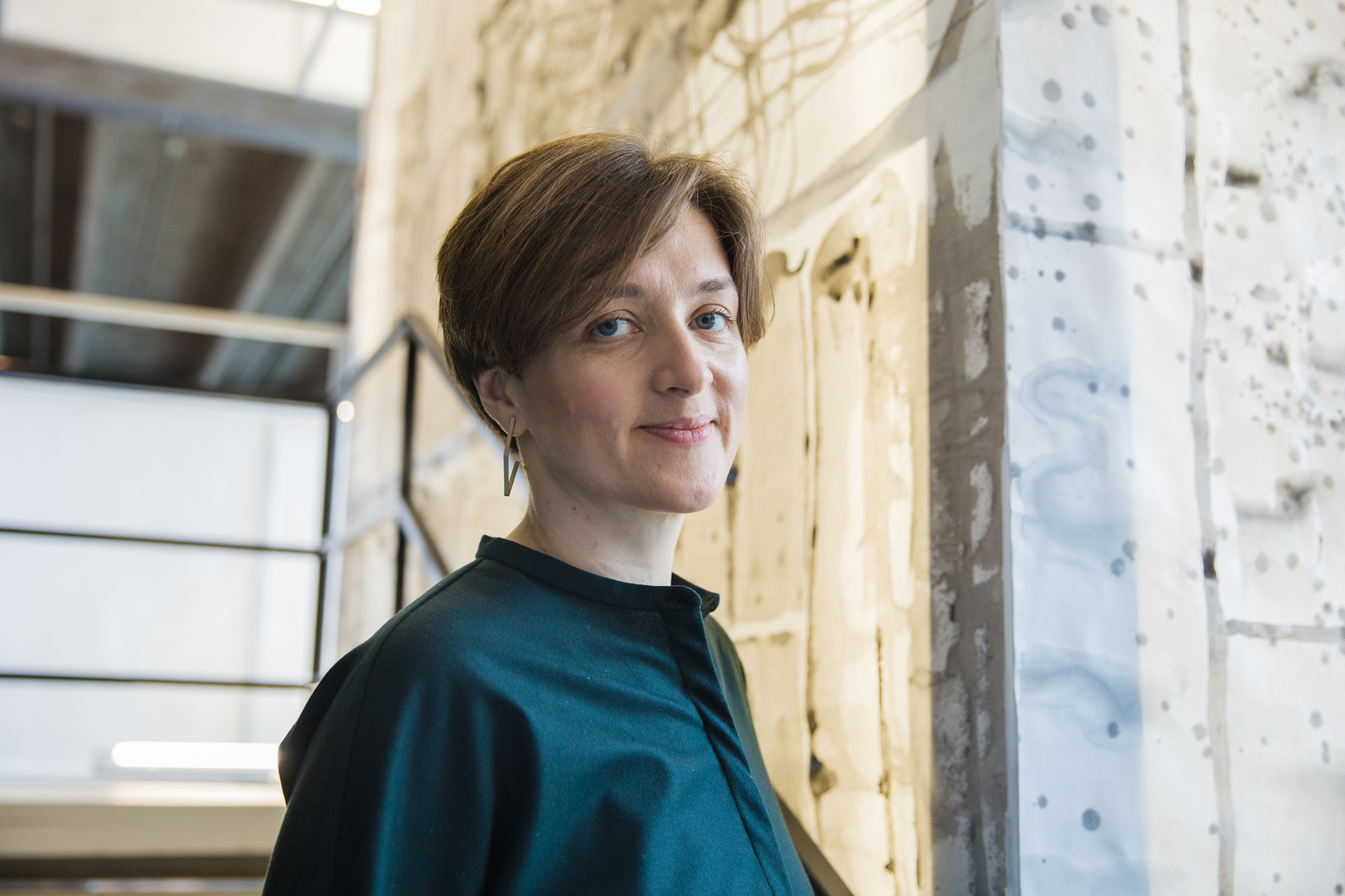
- Portrait of Irina Korina. 2017
- Born: Irina Valerievna Korina; 11 January 1977 (age 49); Moscow, Russia
- Education: Russian Institute of Theatre Arts; Institute of Contemporary Art Moscow; Academy of Fine Arts Vienna
- Known for: Installation art
- Notable work: Good Intentions (2017)
- Style: Contemporary art
- Awards: Innovation Art Prize (2008, 2015), Cosmoscow Artist of the Year (2021)
- Website: irinakorina.com

Irina Korina (Russian: Ирина Валерьевна Корина; born 11 January 1977) is a Russian installation artist known for large-scale immersive installations that combine elements of architecture, theatre scenography, and everyday materials. Drawing on her background in scenic design, her work explores post-Soviet urban space, collective memory, and the relationship between domestic and public environments.

== Biography ==
Korina graduated from the stage design faculty of the Russian Institute of Theatre Arts (GITIS), Moscow, in 2000. She also participated in the Valand Academy exchange programme in Sweden. From 2002 to 2005, she studied at the Academy of Fine Arts Vienna.

Korina has been actively engaged with theatre practice and has had a number of exhibitions since 1999. She was awarded The Debut Prize for drama works in 1999 and also the Soratnik All-Russian Contemporary Art Prize three times in 2006, 2009, and 2012. In 2008 and 2015 Korina became a laureate of the Innovation Prize, the All-Russian State Competition in Contemporary Art. She took part in the 57th Venice Biennale in 2017, and was also awarded the Terna Award for Contemporary Art in 2012.

== Selected Exhibitions ==
=== Solo Exhibitions ===
- 2018 — Schnee von gestern (Snow of Yesterday). Steirischer Herbst Festival, Graz, Austria
- 2017 — The Tail Wags the Comet. Garage Museum of Contemporary Art, Moscow, Russia
- 2016 — Destined to be Happy. GRAD, London, United Kingdom
- 2016 — Humiliated and Elated. XL Gallery, Moscow, Russia
- 2015 — Art Experiment. In the Studio. Garage Center for Contemporary Art, Moscow, Russia
- 2014 — Celebration. Special project for Manifesta 10, Saint Petersburg, Russia
- 2014 — Refrain. Stella Art Foundation, Moscow, Russia
- 2013 — Chapel. Brooklyn Academy of Music, New York City, United States
- 2012 — Demonstrative Behavior. Scaramouche, New York City, United States
- 2009 — Comma13. Bloomberg Space, London, United Kingdom
- 2009 — Installationen. Museum Folkwang, Essen, Germany
- 2009 — Installations. Moscow Museum of Modern Art, Moscow, Russia

=== Group Exhibitions ===
- 2021 — Diversity United. Tempelhof Airport, Berlin, Germany
- 2020 — The Russian Fairy Tale. Tretyakov Gallery, Moscow, Russia
- 2019 — The non-conformists. The Story of a Russian Collection. MO.CO. Montpellier Contemporain, Montpellier, France
- 2019 — The City of Tomorrow. Tretyakov Gallery, Moscow, Russia
- 2019 — XIII Krasnoyarsk Museum Biennale: Negotiatiors. Museum Centre Ploschad Mira, Krasnoyarsk, Russia
- 2018 — The Art of the 2000s. Tretyakov Gallery, Moscow, Russia
- 2018 — It’s Okay to Change Your Mind!. MAMbo – Museo d'Arte Moderna di Bologna, Bologna, Italy
- 2017 — Viva Arte Viva. Main project of the 57th Venice Biennale, Arsenale, Venice, Italy
- 2017 — Space Force Construction. V-A-C Foundation, Palazzo delle Zattere, Venice, Italy
- 2017 — The Travellers: Voyage and Migration in New Art from Central and Eastern Europe. KUMU Art Museum, Tallinn, Estonia
- 2017 — The Work Never Stops. Special project of the Ural Industrial Biennial of Contemporary Art, Tyumen Museum and Education Association, Tyumen, Russia
- 2015 — Post Pop: East Meets West. Saatchi Gallery, London, United Kingdom
- 2015 — Balagan!!!. Kühlhaus, Berlin, Germany
- 2015 — Hope. Special project of the 6th Moscow Biennale of Contemporary Art, Moscow, Russia
- 2014 — Prudential Eye Awards. Suntec City, Singapore
- 2014 — Manifesta 10. Parallel programme, Saint Petersburg, Russia
- 2013 — Modern Art Museum: The Department of Labour and Employment. Special project of the 5th Moscow Biennale of Contemporary Art, Tretyakov Gallery, Moscow, Russia
- 2013 — Lost in Translation. Venice Biennale with the Moscow Museum of Modern Art, Venice, Italy
- 2013 — Archstoyanie. Nikola-Lenivets, Kaluga Region, Russia
- 2012 — Gaiety Is The Most Outstanding Feature Of the Soviet Union. Saatchi Gallery, London, United Kingdom
- 2012 — Angry Birds. Museum of Modern Art, Warsaw, Poland
- 2012 — 2nd Ural Industrial Biennial of Contemporary Art. Yekaterinburg, Russia
- 2010 — Nevermore. MAC VAL Musée d'Art Contemporain du Val-de-Marne, Vitry-sur-Seine, France
- 2009 — Victory Over the Future. Russian Pavilion 53rd International Art Exhibition La Biennale Di Venezia 2009. 53rd Venice Biennale, Venice, Italy
- 2005 — Dialectics of Hope. Main project of the 1st Moscow Biennale of Contemporary Art, Lenin Museum, Moscow, Russia

== Theatre projects and scenography ==
- 2019 — GES-2 Opera, directed by Vsevolod Lisovsky, National Research University MPEI, Moscow, Russia
- 2016 — Love Machines, directed by Maria Chirkova, Electrotheatre Stanislavsky, Moscow, Russia
- 2013 — Marina, directed by Evgenia Berkovich, Gogol Center, Moscow, Russia

== Film work ==
- 2004 — Call Me Genie! (production designer), directed by Ilya Khotinenko

== Selected collections ==
- Saatchi Gallery, London, United Kingdom
- London Mithraeum Bloomberg SPACE, London, United Kingdom
- M HKA. Museum of Contemporary Art, Antwerp, Belgium
- State Tretyakov Gallery, Moscow, Russia
- Garage Museum of Contemporary Art Moscow, Russia
- Moscow Museum of Modern Art, Moscow, Russia
