= AES+F =

Russian artist collective

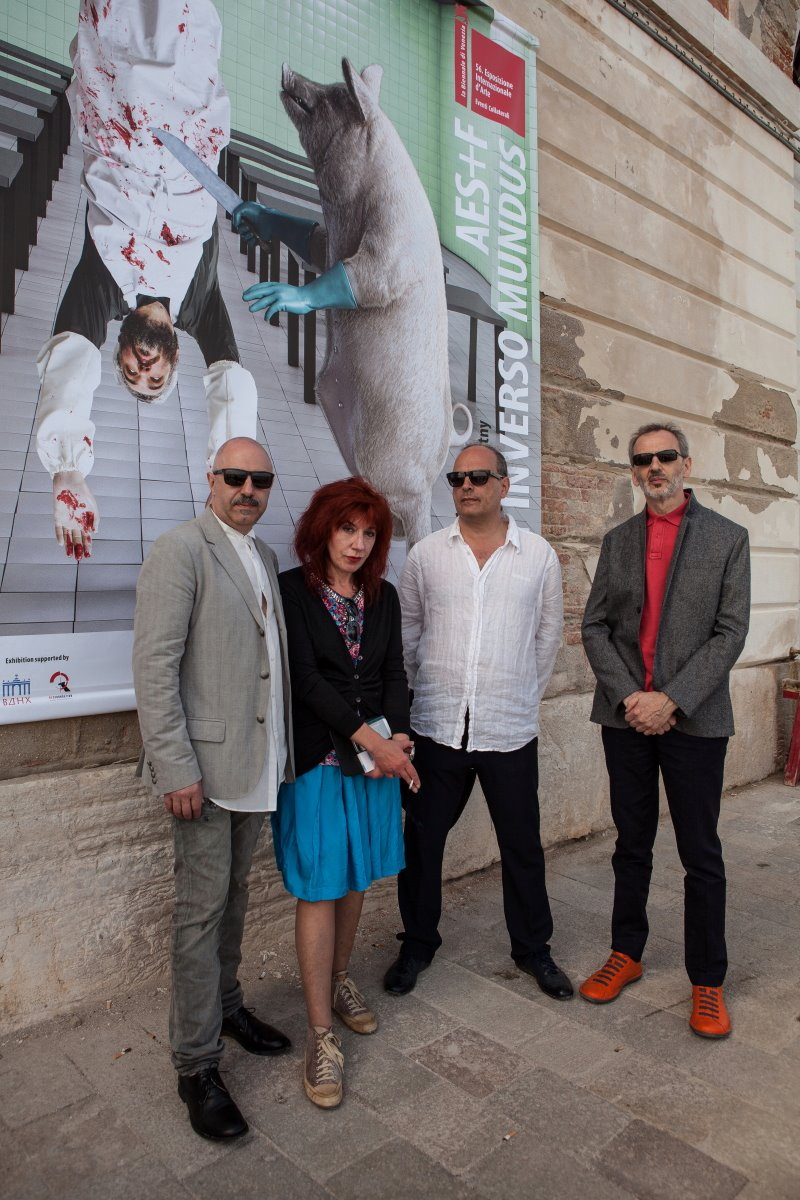
- AES+F at opening of Inverso Mundus, Venice Biennale 2015. Left to Right: Evgeny Svyatsky, Tatiana Arzamasova, Lev Evzovich, Vladimir Fridkes
- Known for: Photography, Video Art, Installation
- Notable work: Islamic Project, The Liminal Space Trilogy, Inverso Mundus
- Awards: Kandinsky Prize
- Website: http://aesf.art

AES+F is a collective of four Russian artists: Tatiana Arzamasova (born 1955), Lev Evzovich (born 1958), Evgeny Svyatsky (born 1957), and Vladimir Fridkes (born 1956). It was first formed as AES Group in 1987 by Arzamasova, Evzovich, and Svyatsky, becoming AES+F when Fridkes joined in 1995. The collective works in photography, video, installation, and animation, as well as more traditional media, such as painting, drawing, and sculpture. AES+F's early work included performance, installation, painting, and illustration. Well known for their monumental video-art installations that Gareth Harris describes as "monumental painting set in motion", AES+F create grand visual narratives that explore contemporary global values, vices and conflicts.

== Members ==
=== Tatiana Arzamasova ===
Tatiana Arzamasova was born in 1955 in Moscow, where she graduated from Moscow Architectural Institute (MArchI) – State Academy in 1978. Prior to founding AES Group, Arzamasova was a conceptual architect. She participated in conceptual architecture exhibitions in London, Paris, and Venice.

=== Lev Evzovich ===
Evzovich was born in 1958 in Moscow, where he graduated from Moscow Architectural Institute (MARCHI) – State Academy in 1982. Prior to founding AES Group, Evzovich also worked in conceptual architecture. He participated in conceptual architecture exhibitions in Milan, Frankfurt-on-Main, and Paris. He also worked as an art director in film.

=== Evgeny Svyatsky ===
Evgeny Svyatsky was born in 1957 in Moscow, where he graduated from the Moscow University of Print Design in 1980. Prior to founding AES Group, Svyatsky worked in book illustration, advertising, and graphic design. He also worked as the creative director for publishing houses in Moscow.

=== Vladimir Fridkes ===
Vladimir Fridkes was born in Moscow in 1956, where he worked as a fashion photographer prior to joining the collective. His work was published in many leading fashion magazines: VOGUE, Harper's Bazaar, ELLE, Marie Claire, Cosmopolitan and the Sunday Times Style.

== Career ==
AES+F began their career as AES Group, with Arzamasova, Evzovich, and Svyatsky forming the group in 1987. The collective exhibited internationally for the first time in 1989 with a solo show at Howard Yezerski Gallery in Boston, and a performance at the Carpenter Center at Harvard University in Cambridge. The group expanded with the addition of the photographer Vladimir Fridkes in 1995 and subsequently changed its name to AES+F.

The collective achieved wider recognition in the Russian Pavilion at the 52nd Biennale di Venezia in 2007 with Last Riot (2007), the first in a trilogy of large-scale, multi-channel video installations. The second of the series, The Feast of Trimalchio (2009), appeared in Venice in 2009, and the third, Allegoria Sacra (2011), debuted at the 4th Moscow Biennale in 2011. Together, all three projects premiered as The Liminal Space Trilogy in September 2012 at the Martin-Gropius-Bau, Berlin, and the Moscow Manege, the central exhibition hall of the artists’ home city. The Trilogy was shown in the Museum of Fine Arts in La Chaux-de-Fonds, Switzerland (June–September 2014). Most recently all three videos were shown at Albright–Knox Art Gallery, Buffalo, NY (June–September 2015).

AES+F have exhibited at numerous international festivals: (namely the biennales of Venice, Lyon, Sydney, Gwangju, Moscow, Gothenburg, Havana, Tirana, Istanbul, Bratislava, Seoul etc.), ARS-06 (KIASMA, Helsinki). Their works appear in some of the world's most important collections, such as Moderna Museet (Stockholm), Musée de l'Elysée (Lausanne), MOCAK (Kraków), Sammlung Goetz (Munich), ZKM (Karlsruhe), Maison européenne de la photographie (Paris), Art Gallery of South Australia (Adelaide), and the Museum of Old and New Art (Tasmania), Centro de Arte Dos de Mayo (Madrid), Centre Georges Pompidou (Paris), and the Louis Vuitton Foundation (Paris). Their work is represented in some of Russia's principal national museums, such as Tretyakov Gallery (Moscow), Russian Museum (St. Petersburg), and the Multimedia Art Museum (Moscow).

AES+F's project Inverso Mundus was presented at the 56th Venice Biennale as a collateral event at the Magazzini del Sale and later presented at COME ALIVE (Niet Normaal INT) in Het Nieuwe Muntgebouw, Utrecht, The Netherlands.

== Works ==
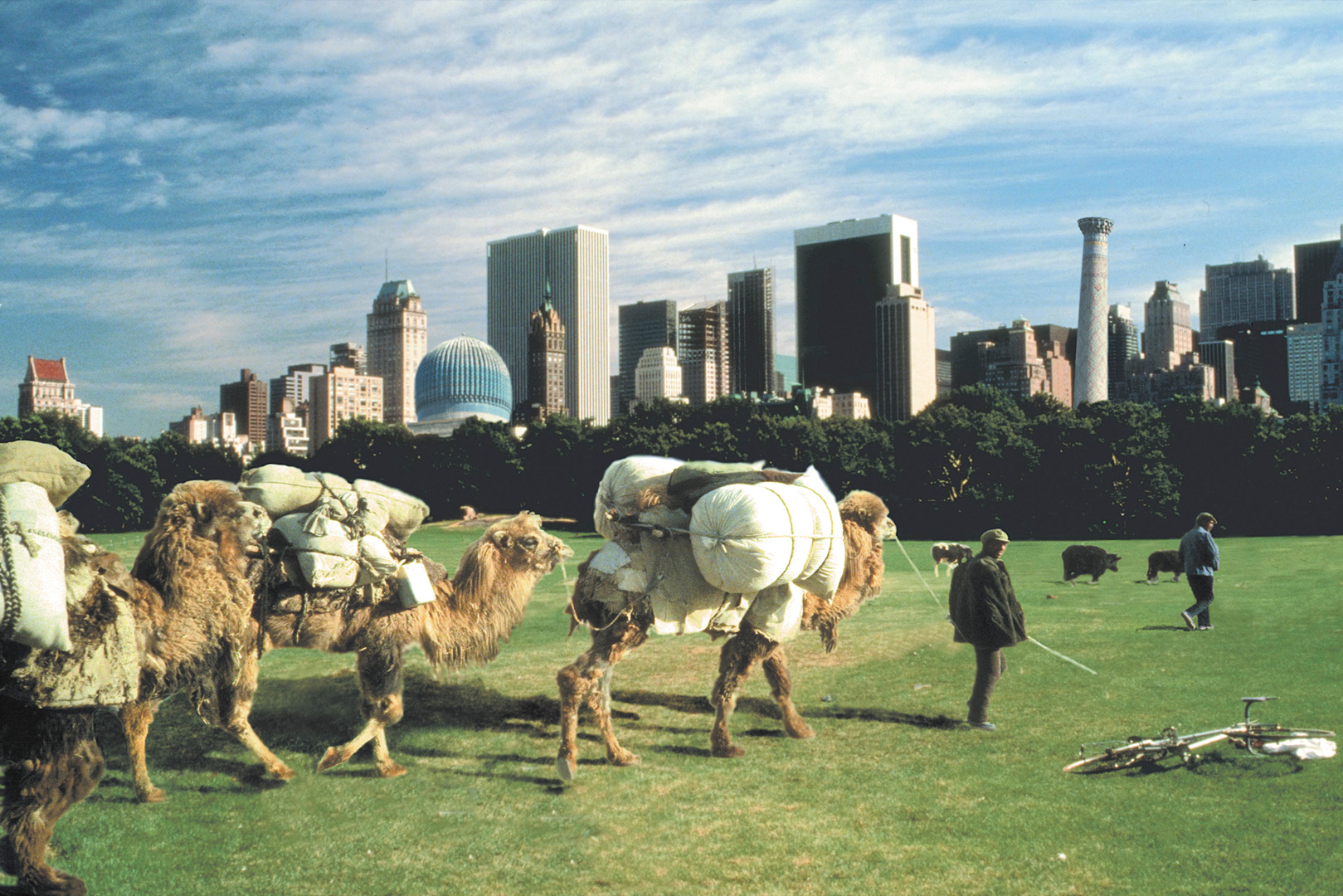
Islamic Project - Central Park by AES+F, 1996.

=== Islamic Project (1996-2003) ===
Islamic Project began in 1996 as a performance and public intervention. AES+F created the "AES Travel Agency to the Future," an imitation of a travel office with subversive materials - souvenirs from a future in which the influence of Islam has been superimposed upon all of Western culture in the form of architectural and cultural transformations. In one of the images, the artists transformed the Statue of Liberty to show her in a Burka, holding a Quran; in another, they prophetically depict the New York skyline absent of the Twin Towers. The project has been met with attempts to censor certain imagery when it was shown in the New Art Gallery in Walsall, United Kingdom in 2006.

In 2000, AES+F created another installation in the form of a Bedouin tent titled "Oasis", consisting of a series of traditional carpets, each with imagery from the Islamic Project printed on silk in the center." Oasis was first exhibited at the La Caixa Foundation in Barcelona, Spain.

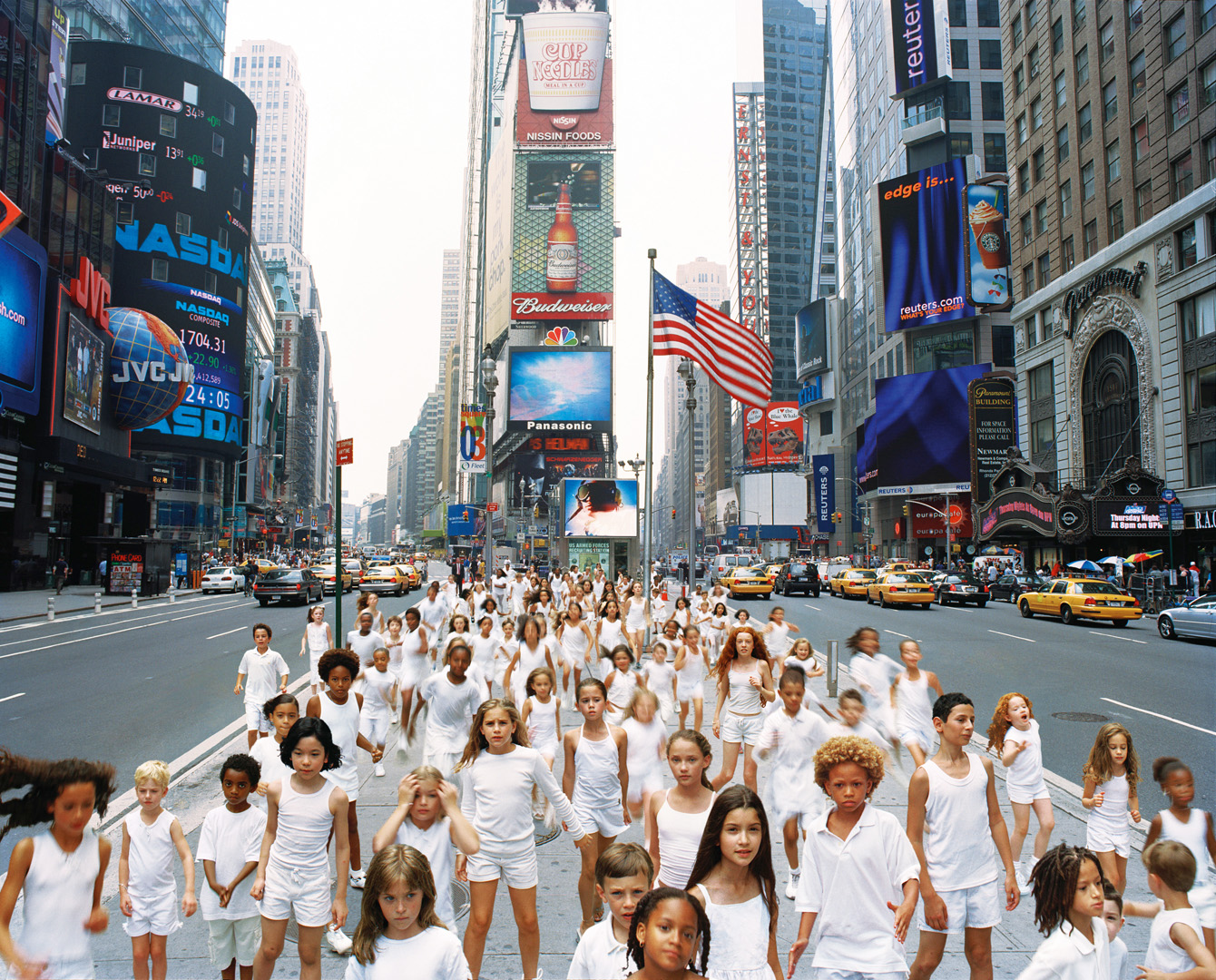
KFNY by AES+F, 2003.

=== King of the Forest (2001-2003) ===
The King of the Forest is a trilogy of projects inspired by Erlkönig, the Ogre - a mythological creature of medieval Europe and also the subject of an eponymous novel by Michele Tournier. The King of the Forest stole beautiful children from nearby villages and kept them in his palace. According to AES+F, this series of projects concerns itself with the theft of youth by mass media culture - a contemporary analogue to the medieval Ogre.

In AES+F's King of the Forest, the artists created three videos on different continents - Le Roi des Aulnes in St. Petersburg, More than Paradise in Cairo, and KFNY in New York. The first in the series, Le Roi des Aulnes, was shot at Catherine the Great's palace in Tsarskoye Selo. The second, More than Paradise, was shot at the Mosque of Muhammad Ali. The final project in the series, KFNY, was shot on Military Island in Times Square.

=== The Liminal Space Trilogy ===
The Liminal Space Trilogy attempts to analyze the 21st century from the perspective of a centuries-old art-historical tradition of depicting Hell, Heaven, and Purgatory. The trilogy is presented as three projects consisting of video installations, prints, drawings, paintings, and sculptures. It is set respectively in a video game landscape, an exotic luxury resort, and a futuristic airport, each of which is depicted as a unique surrealistic fantasy that explores contemporary themes.

==== Last Riot (2005-2007) ====
The project consists of an HD video installation (3- and 1-channel versions), series of stills from the video, series of pictures, series of drawings, series of sculptures

Last Riot premiered at the Russian pavilion at the Venice Biennale in 2007. The work depicts an imagined future digitally manipulated where snow-capped mountains sit next to desolate beaches, neon dragons rest atop oil platforms, planes collide without flames, and a band of attractive teens with completely ambiguous and detached facial expressions are engaged in ritualistic battle with one another and with themselves.

Conceived as a reflection of the 21st century, Last Riot raises questions regarding Western values, and reflects contemporary Western mythology without passing judgment. The visual ethos of Last Riot is rife with allusions to art history, from Caravaggio and Baroque painting, to Romanticism, combined with contemporary visual culture in the form of advertising, film, and video games, and traversing the aesthetic line between beauty and ugliness.

==== The Feast of Trimalchio (2009-2010) ====
The second project in the Liminal Space Trilogy, The Feast of Trimalchio, is titled as such in reference to the epic "Satyricon" by Gaius Petronius Arbiter, namely, the Cena Trimalchionis, which describes the life of a wealthy former slave who hosts gluttonous and orgiastic feasts. In AES+F's The Feast of Trimalchio, an imaginary island with an absurdly luxurious resort-hotel, which is a de-personification of Petronius' Trimalchio, serves as a "temporary paradise" that guests pay to enter. The guests of the hotel indulge in all of the contemporary pleasures perpetuated in advertisements of resort getaways, from leisurely fitness to "body purification," while the viewer sees any notion of social hierarchy dissipate as the masters begin to court the servants, acting out their fantasies of a Roman Saturnalia.

The project consists of an HD video installation (9-, 3-, and 1-channel versions), series of pictures, series of stills from the video, series of portfolios with photographs and drawings.

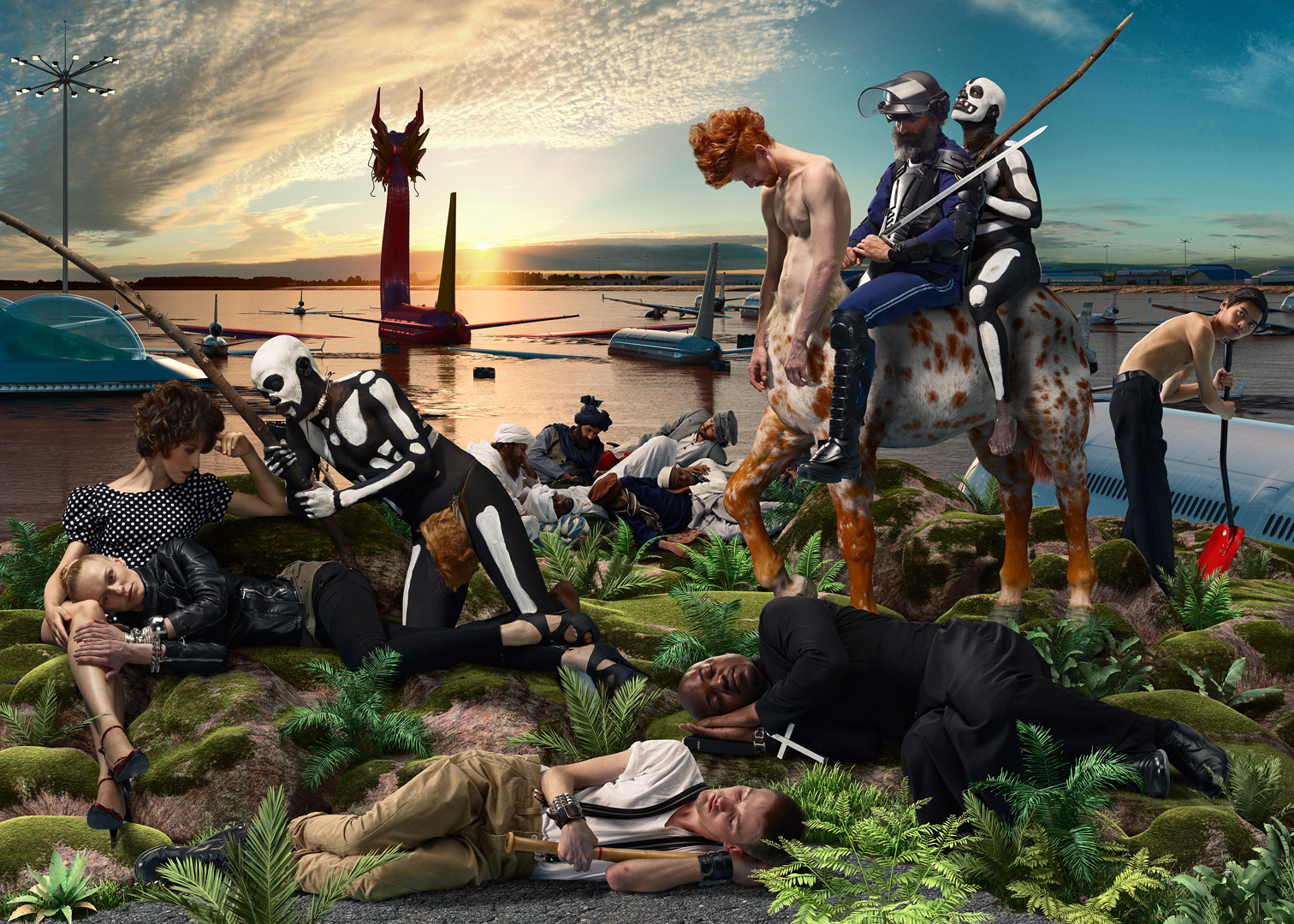
Allegoria Sacra, Knight and Death, by AES+F. 2012

==== Allegoria Sacra (2011-2013) ====
The project consists of an HD video installation (5-, 3-, and 1-channel versions), series of pictures, series of stills from the video.

Allegoria Sacra is the final part of the Liminal Space Trilogy. Named after Giovanni Bellini's eponymous painting which hangs in the Uffizi Gallery, AES+F's Allegoria Sacra represents Purgatory. Taking place in a futuristic international airport, Allegoria Sacra serves as a metaphor for limbo, where the souls of "righteous sinners" await their fate. The characters that inhabit Giovanni Bellini's masterpiece, from biblical figures to mythological creatures, were transposed and sometimes reinterpreted by AES+F. The Saracen-Muslim was transformed into a group of refugees. St. Sebastian became a young, shirtless traveler, hitchhiking his way through tropical countries, while Apostle Paul is represented as an airport policeman. However, AES+F's piece is more of an allegory of contemporary life than a reinterpretation of Giovanni Bellini's painting. As the travelers enter dream-like states, the airport and the aircraft undergo several metamorphoses, while the landscape and the climate go through four phases - from being a snowy field to a desert, a jungle, and finally becoming an endless river Styx.

Maintaining their signature style, AES+F combine recognizable motifs from art-history and pop-culture, such as the numerous allusions to Stanley Kubrick's film 2001: A Space Odyssey. Allegoria Sacra weaves complex global issues into visually compelling metaphors, letting them unfold in the neutral transitory space of an airport, where all kinds of things can temporarily coexist before going to their destination.

Allegoria Sacra won the Sergey Kuryokhin Award (2011), the main award of the Kandinsky Prize (2012), the main award of the Nordart Festival (2014), and the Pino Pascali Prize (2015) (18th Edition).
