= Valery Chtak =

Russian conceptual artist (1981–2024)

Valery Chtak (Russian: Валерий Чтак; 1981 – 23 May 2024) was a Russian conceptual artist, most notable for monochrome paintings with inscriptions. He is sometimes considered one of the most recognizable Russian artists of his generation.

Chtak started as an artist at the end of the 1990s, under the influence of Avdey Ter-Oganyan and Anatoly Osmolovsky in Moscow. Originally, he participated in street actions, but soon decided to switch to different art forms. At the time, his main topic became political protest using the language of art. Already in the 2000, Chtak had several solo exhibitions in Moscow. His paintings were bought, among others, by the Tretyakov Gallery and the Moscow Museum of Modern Art.

Chtak used various media, including installations, and even founded a rock band Sthowʼs Seths, but he was mainly known for his paintings, often monochrome and having simple inscriptions. The inscriptions were a direct message and were most often in Russian, but sometimes also in languages Chtak did not speak such as German or Czech. He sometimes painted portraits which intentionally did not bear resemblance to the models, and in this case the inscription identified the model.

He died 23 May 2024 after battling a serious illness.
