= Joseph Backstein Institute of Contemporary Art =

Contemporary art school in Moscow, Russia

Coordinates: 55°45′55″N 37°37′37″E

- Институт современного искусства Иосифа Бакштейна
- Moscow; Russia

Information
- Former name: Institute of Contemporary Art (1992–2001); Institute of Problems of Contemporary Art (2001–2018)
- Type: Independent art school
- Established: 1992 (Note: Some sources give 1991 as the year of foundation.)
- Director: Taisia Korotysheva
- Rector: Stanislav Shuripa
- Website: icamoscow.ru

The Joseph Backstein Institute of Contemporary Art (Russian: Институт современного искусства Иосифа Бакштейна), also known as ICA Moscow, is an independent school of contemporary art in Moscow. It was founded in 1992 by the curator Joseph Backstein together with a group of artists, curators and theorists, and was directed by him until his death in 2024.

The organisation was originally called the Institute of Contemporary Art. In November 2001, following re-registration, its Russian name became Институт проблем современного искусства (Institute of Problems of Contemporary Art, abbreviated ИПСИ or IPSI), while in English it continued to use the name ICA Moscow. It was named after its founder in 2018.

ICA Moscow is a prominent Russian contemporary art school, alongside the Free Workshops (Svobodnye Masterskie), the Rodchenko Moscow School of Photography and Multimedia, and the Baza Institute. The institute maintains partnerships with art schools abroad and preserves archival and theoretical material relating to its educational and curatorial work.

Olga Sviblova, director of the Rodchenko Moscow School of Photography and Multimedia, has said that ICA Moscow occupies an important niche in contemporary art education and has become one of the more flexible alternatives to traditional academic programmes.

== History ==
In 1990 Joseph Backstein visited the Institute of Contemporary Art in Boston and, impressed by the American model of art education, decided to set up a similar institution in Moscow. With Igor Makarevich, Elena Elagina and other colleagues he registered an organisation that later developed into the institute. The founding is generally dated to 1992, although some sources give 1991.

Initially the institute functioned as a discussion club for like-minded artists and theorists, which published books on art and organised exhibitions of the Avant-Gardists' Club (KLAVA) in Russia and abroad. The first formal intake of students took place in 1999.

The institute's flagship course, "New Artistic Strategies", covered twentieth- and twenty-first-century art theory, work with contemporary media, curatorial practice and the development of individual projects. Teaching was pitched at postgraduate level and aimed at artists already established in practice.

From November 2001, following re-registration, the institute's Russian name became the Institute of Problems of Contemporary Art.

In 2013 the institute and the non-profit organisation International Projects 21 opened the Sokol Centre for Contemporary Art at Baltiyskaya Street 9 in Moscow, which hosted exhibitions, educational programmes, workshops and artists' studios until it closed in 2015.

The course became a two-year programme in 2015, and in 2016 new strands were added alongside "New Artistic Strategies" to train curators and art historians as well as artists.

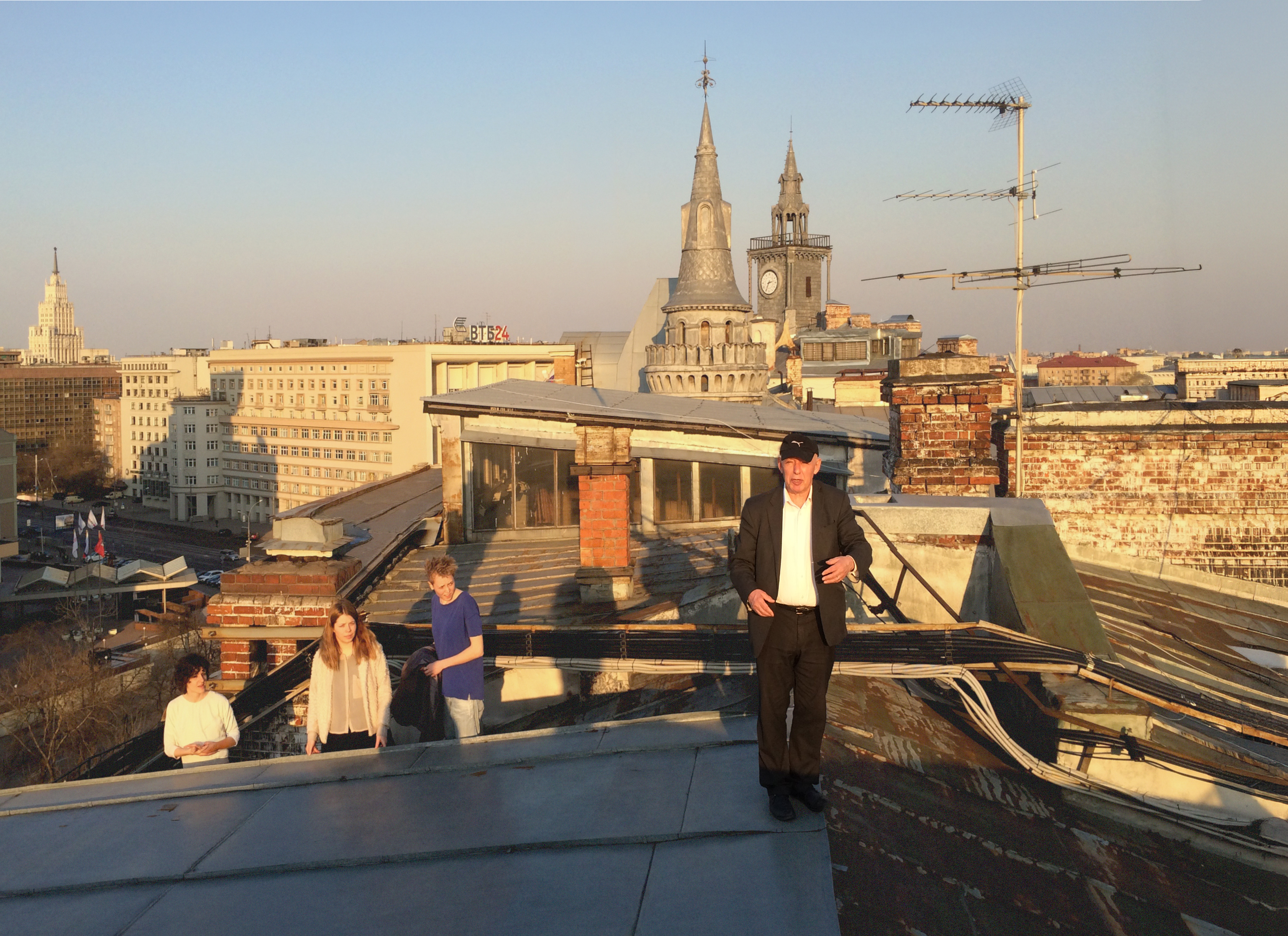
Joseph Backstein with ICA students on the roof of Ilya Kabakov's former studio on Sretensky Boulevard, Moscow

Until 2018 classes were held in Ilya Kabakov's former studio on Sretensky Boulevard. In 2018 the institute was renamed the Joseph Backstein Institute of Contemporary Art.

Backstein died in London on 12 January 2024, aged 78, after a long illness. The institute has continued to operate under rector Stanislav Shuripa and director Taisia Korotysheva.

== Teaching staff ==
Key figures on the teaching staff have included Stanislav Shuripa, who teaches "The History of Ideas in Art of the Second Half of the 20th Century" and also serves as the institute's rector; Alexandra Obukhova, who teaches "The History of Contemporary Russian Art"; Irina Kulik, who teaches "Major Movements in Art of the Second Half of the 20th Century"; and Antonio Geusa, who teaches "The History of Video Art".

== Educational approach ==
The "New Artistic Strategies" programme is built around independent student work, theory courses, critical seminars and exhibitions. Classes are held in the evenings, and the institute does not impose a single artistic school or stylistic requirement. The programme is intended to develop conceptual thinking, familiarity with the language of contemporary art and the ability to realise independent projects.

The programme comprises:

- lectures on art history and theory;
- master classes with artists and curators;
- seminars and discussions with theorists and other art-world specialists;
- individual tutorials;
- student exhibitions and degree projects;
- summer schools and exchange programmes.

The strand for curators and theorists is integrated into the main course and includes textual analysis, discussion of exhibitions and joint curatorial projects with students. Teaching is available both in person and remotely.

Admission involves a short interview assessing the applicant's motivation; in 2010 around 90 candidates competed for 35 places. Auditing the course as a non-degree student is also possible. Applicants are expected to have a craft grounding already, so the institute is not a substitute for a traditional art school; students often arrive having graduated from the Surikov Institute or the Stroganov Academy.

In an interview with Ekaterina Muromtseva, Shuripa said that teaching at the institute rests on independent artistic practice: an artist needs to be able to "see the subject, the metaphor", and to work with images as both data and signs.

The first year is devoted to the humanities and art theory, including courses in philosophy, cultural studies, the sociology of culture and twentieth-century art history. The second year concentrates on practical work and individual projects while retaining a theoretical component.

== Partnerships ==
Key partners have included:

- Valand Academy (Gothenburg, Sweden) — one of the first institutions with which the institute set up a staff and student exchange. In the late 1990s and early 2000s a number of ICA Moscow students went on to study at Valand.
- Städelschule (Frankfurt, Germany) — joint projects, exhibitions and staff exchange.
- University of Applied Arts Vienna (Vienna, Austria) — the partnership began in 2012 and has included master classes and joint student exhibitions with the university's Digital Art department. In 2014 the institute and the university mounted a joint exhibition, "Transformation of Perception", curated by Roland Schöny of the university, shown at the Sokol Centre.
- Goldsmiths, University of London — student exchange, joint courses and exhibitions. In 2013 and 2014 students from ICA Moscow and Goldsmiths made reciprocal visits, culminating in a joint exhibition, "Space Without Exceptions", at the Sokol Centre, which brought together Russian and British participants including Carl Gent, Sarah Duffy, Doreen van Meel, Pavel Otdelnov, Maria Gorodetskaya and Ekaterina Isaeva.

== Publishing ==
The institute publishes print and electronic material, including selected lectures by its teaching staff, texts on the history and theory of contemporary art and material on the philosophy of culture, as well as catalogues of its exhibitions and other research and curatorial output.

Publications include:

- Shuripa, Stanislav (2013). Molok, Nikolai (ed.). Selected Lectures on Contemporary Art and Philosophy. Proceedings of IPSI (in Russian). Vol. I. Moscow: Institute of Problems of Contemporary Art. p. 272. ISBN 978-5-904652-05-0.
- Aronson, Oleg; Petrovskaya, Elena (2015). What Remains of Art. Proceedings of IPSI (in Russian). Vol. 2. Moscow: Institute of Problems of Contemporary Art. p. 344. ISBN 978-5-9906243-0-6.
- Shuripa, Stanislav (2017). Action and Meaning in Art of the Second Half of the 20th Century. Proceedings of IPSI (in Russian). Vol. 3. Moscow: Institute of Problems of Contemporary Art. p. 344. ISBN 978-5-9906243-4-4.
- Molok, Nikolai, ed. (2013). Judgement Day, or the Problem of Aesthetic Judgement: Conference Proceedings (in Russian). Moscow: Institute of Problems of Contemporary Art. p. 208. ISBN 978-5-904652-03-6.
- Bushenyova, Nadezhda; Oleynik, Valeria (2010). Time, Forward? Catalogue of the Group Exhibition (in Russian). Moscow: Institute of Problems of Contemporary Art. p. 118.

== Alumni ==
By September 2017 the institute had some 650 graduates; as of 2025 the institute's website gave a figure of more than 700 artists and curators.

Notable alumni include Viktor Alimpiev, whose work was shown in the main exhibition of the 55th Venice Biennale; the two-time Innovation Prize laureate Irina Korina; the Kandinsky Prize laureates Diana Machulina and Taisia Korotkova; and other participants in major Russian and international exhibitions.
