= Garage Museum of Contemporary Art =

Art museum in Moscow, Russia

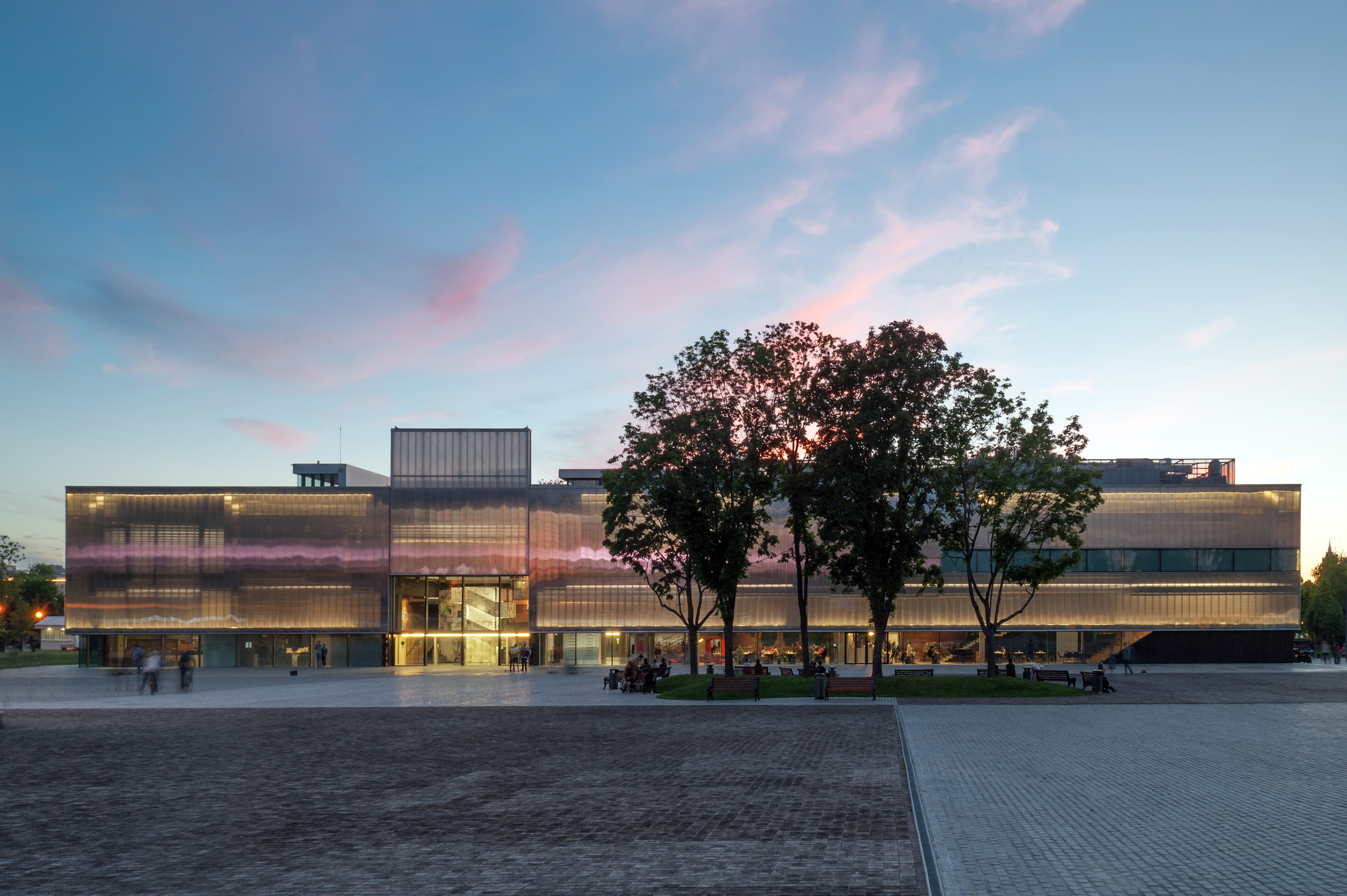
- Garage Museum, 2017
- Former name: The Garage Center for Contemporary Culture
- Established: 2008; 18 years ago
- Location: Moscow, Russia
- Coordinates: 55°43′40.31″N 37°36′5.75″E
- Type: Art Museum
- Founders: Dasha Zhukova; Roman Abramovich
- Architect: Rem Koolhaas
- Website: www.garageccc.com/en

The Garage Museum of Contemporary Art, also referred to simply as The Garage Museum, is a privately funded art gallery in Moscow, Russia. It was founded by Dasha Zhukova and Roman Abramovich as the Garage Center for Contemporary Culture in 2008 and was renamed on 1 May 2014. Since June 2015, it has been housed in a building designed by the Dutch architect Rem Koolhaas.

As well as providing permanent collections and changing exhibitions, the museum also operates as a research centre. It has archives relating to Russian contemporary art from the 1950s. It also runs educational programmes and publishes material relating to current developments in Russian and international art and culture.

== History ==
When the museum opened in June 2008, it was housed in Moscow's former Bakhmetevsky Bus Garage, designed in 1926 by the Constructivist architect Konstantin Melnikov, hence the museum's name. Dasha Zhukova was the first director of museum. The British singer Amy Winehouse gave a private performance at the official opening.

In 2009 it was the main venue for the Third Moscow Biennale of Contemporary Art, curated by Jean-Hubert Martin. During the Biennale, over 100,000 people a month visited the Garage Museum.

In 2012, the museum relocated to a temporary pavilion designed by architect Shigeru Ban in Gorky Park before moving to its permanent home on 12 June 2015.

The museum's new headquarters was originally a modernist building built in 1968 as the Vremena Goda (English:Seasons of the Year), a Soviet-era restaurant. It was redesigned by Rem Koolhaas specifically for the Garage Museum.

Zhukova, who was formerly editor-in-chief of the fashion magazine Pop, founded Garage Magazine, an art and fashion magazine in 2008.

The museum was awarded the Japanese Foreign Minister’s Commendation for their contributions to promotion of Japanese Culture in Russia on December 1, 2020.

== Collections and exhibitions ==
In 2018, the museum was the venue for bauhaus imaginista. Moving Away: The Internationalist Architect, which explored the work of a group o trained German architects, Konrad Püschel, Philipp Tolziner and Lotte Stam-Beese, who along with their former teacher, Hannes Meyer, worked in the Soviet Union in the early 1930s. Bauhaus Imaginista ran a series of exhibitions around the world to commemorate the 2019 centenary of the founding of the Bauhaus.

In June 2024, the museum announced a new direction of activity: it starts collecting contemporary Russian art of the 1980s-2020s.
