= Moscow Biennale =

Russian arts festival

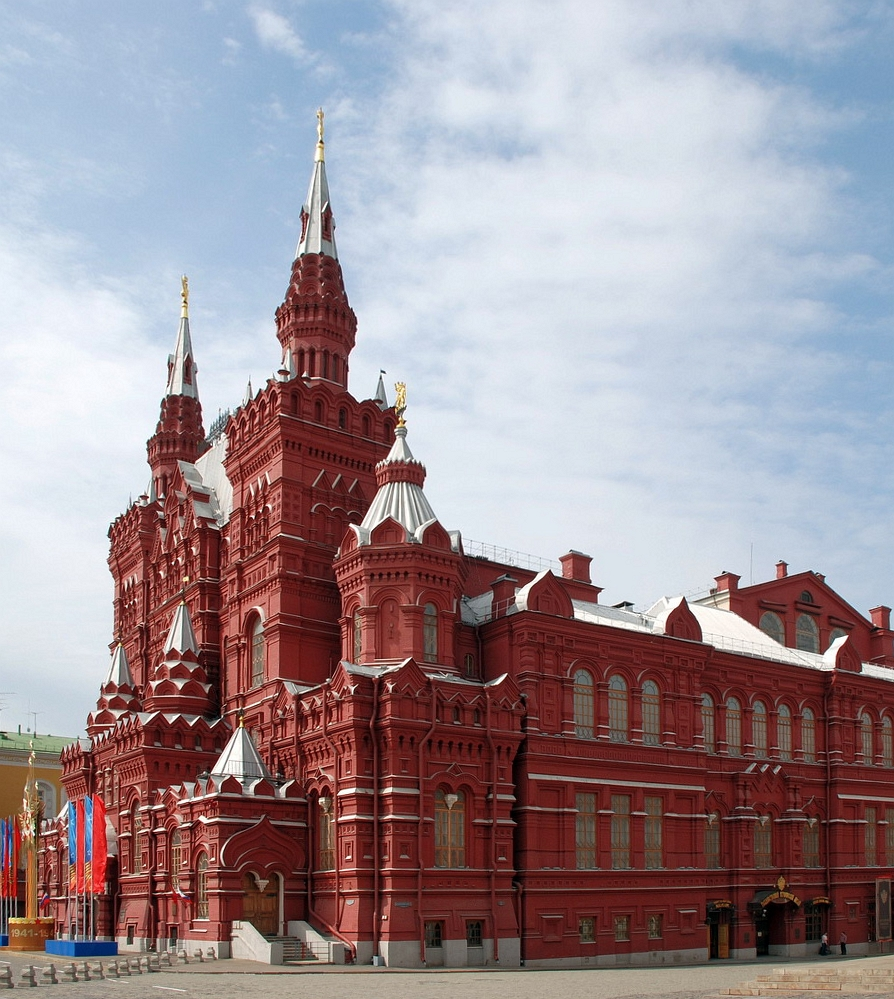
State Historical Museum (former Lenin Museum), Moscow

The Moscow Biennale of Contemporary Art is one of the most important Russian cultural events and was founded in 2003.

== First Moscow Biennale of Contemporary Art ==
The First Moscow Biennale of Contemporary Art (January 28 – February 28, 2005) caused a great response in Russia and abroad. The main exhibition, “Dialectics of Hope,” included projects by 41 artists from 22 countries and represented art that focused on one of the most fundamental experiences of modern human beings: hope. The main project was realised at the former Lenin Museum, near the Red Square. The Biennale's special projects and parallel program numbered over 50 exhibitions of Russian actual art and European, American and Asian visual artists. Curators (main project): Joseph Backstein, Daniel Birnbaum, Iara Boubnova, Nicolas Bourriaud, Rosa Martinez and Hans Ulrich Obrist.

== Second Moscow Biennale of Contemporary Art ==
The main project of the Second Moscow Biennale of Contemporary Art (March 1 – April 1, 2007) titled “FOOTNOTES on Geopolitics, Market and Amnesia,” showed works of 115 artists from 20 countries. Different curators and curatorial teams realized 5 exhibitions of the main project united by one theme. The project featured the exhibitions organized at various venues, including The State Tretyakov Gallery, Moscow Contemporary Art Center Winzavod, and Moscow Museum of Modern Art.

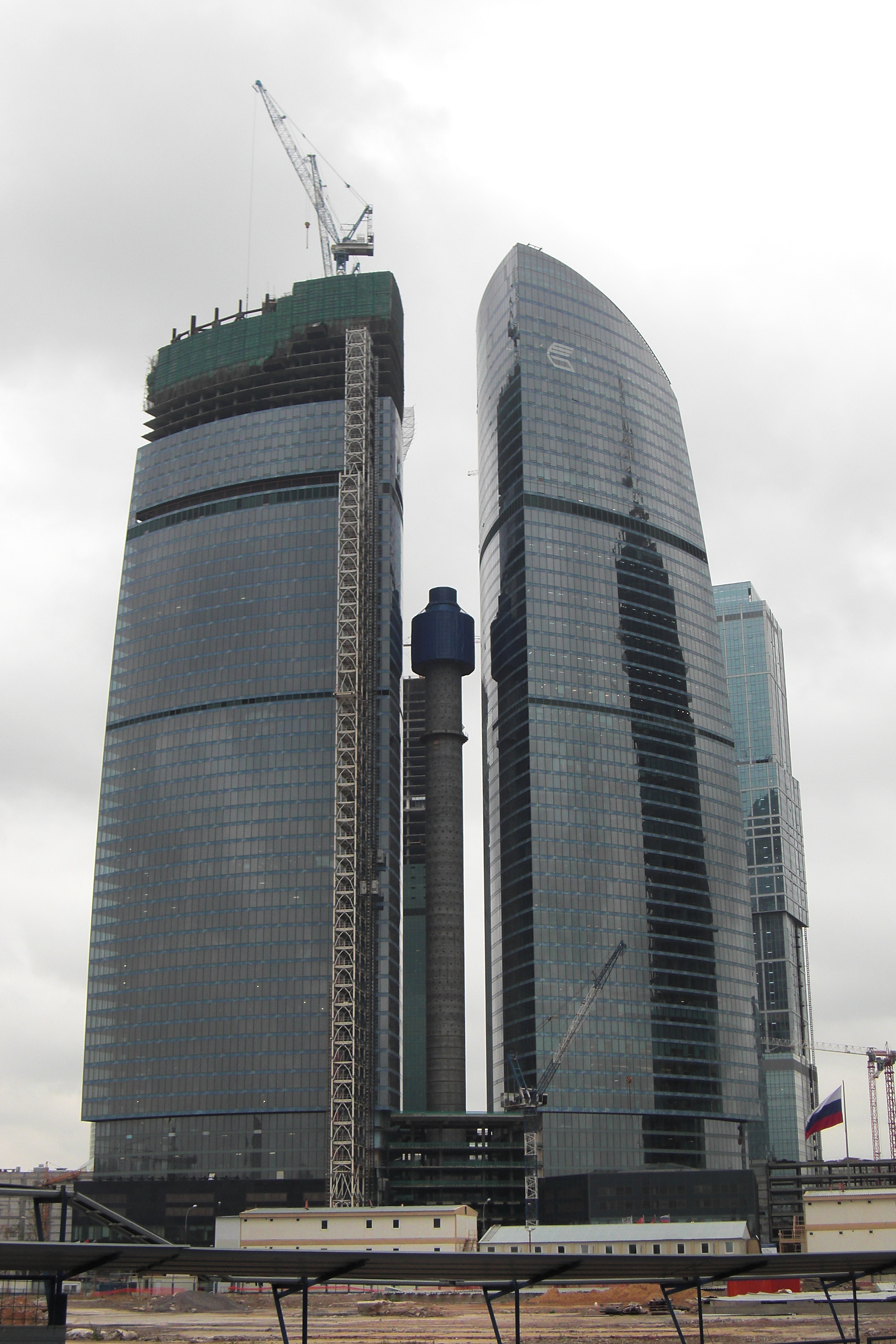
Moscow-City, Federation Tower

Exhibitions of the main project:

- Nothing but Footnotes? Art in the Epoch of Social Darwinism, Moscow-City, Federation Tower. Curator: Joseph Backstein.
- USA: American video art at the beginning of the 3rd Millennium, Shopping centre TsUM. Curators: Daniel Birnbaum, Gunnar B. Kvaran, Hans Ulrich Obrist.
- History in present tense. Moscow-City, Federation Tower. Curator: Iara Boubnova.
- Stock Zero, Or The Icy Water Of Egoistical Calculation, Moscow-City, Federation Tower. Curator: Nicolas Bourriaud.
- After all. Moscow-City, Federation Tower, State Schusev Museum of Architecture. Curators: Fulya Erdemci and Rosa Martinez.

== Third Moscow Biennale of Contemporary Art ==
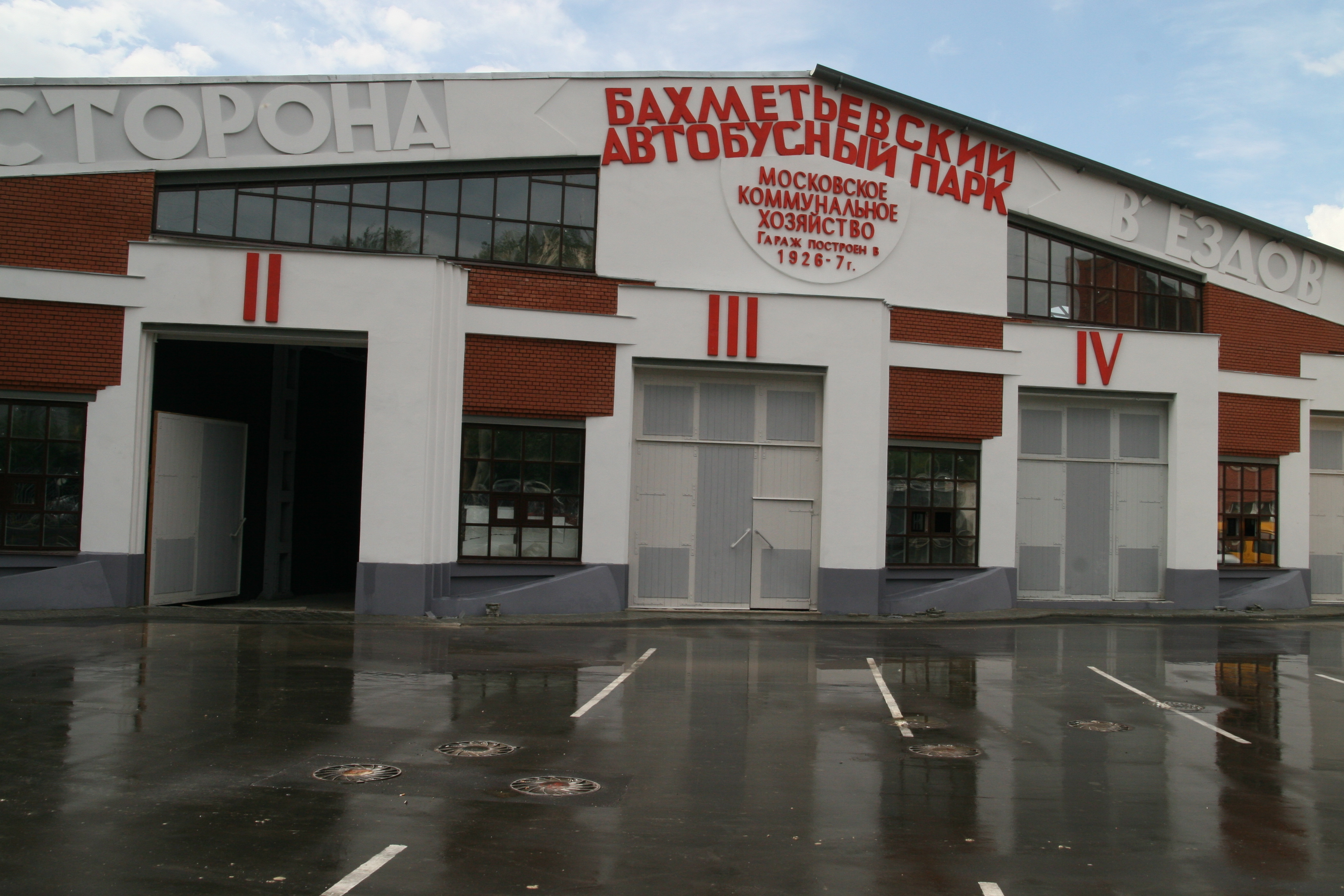
Garage Center of Contemporary Culture, Moscow

The commissioner of the Biennale was Joseph Backstein. The exhibition program of the Third Moscow Biennale of Contemporary Art (September 24 - November 1, 2009) featured the main project "Against exclusion" and more than 39 special projects and 7 special guest shows.

=== Main project "Against exclusion" ===
The main project of Third Moscow Biennale of Contemporary Art entitled "Against exclusion" (curator Jean-Hubert Martin, best known for his exhibition "Magiciens de la terre" at the Centre Pompidou, Paris, 1989) was held at the Garage Center for Contemporary Culture (now known as Garage Museum of Contemporary Art) and was presenting artists from Russia, Europe, United States, Asia, South America, Africa and Oceania. French curator Jean-Hubert Martin mixed the work of well-known contemporary Western artists with non-Western and non-professional artists. Exhibition Designer and Dutch Curator Mattijs Visser and French Curator Oliver Varenne assisted him.

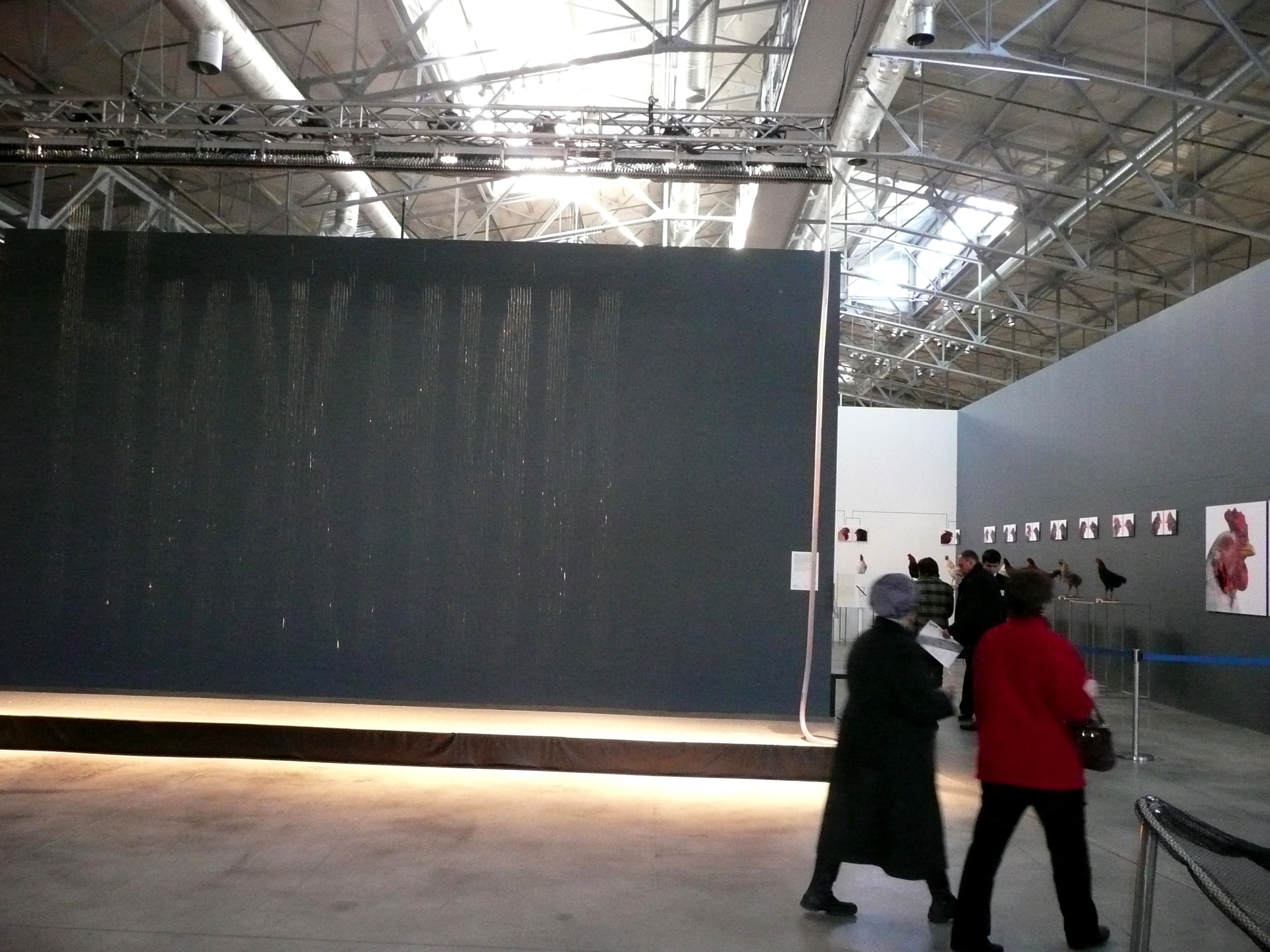
Sculpture/Fountain by Julius Popp at the 3rd Moscow Biennale

.

=== Special guests shows ===
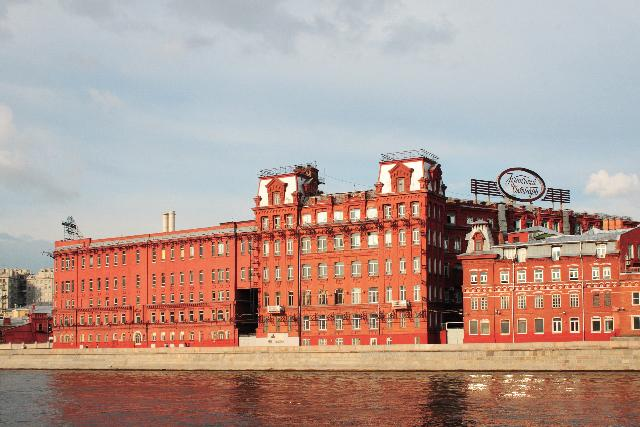
Red October chocolate factory

The Special Guest program represents personal exhibitions of the important figures of the modern art scene.

- Olga Chernysheva, Russia. "Present - Past", Baibakov Art Projects, Red October (former chocolate factory)
- Antony Gormley, Great Britain. "Domain Field," The Garage Center for Contemporary Culture (July 16 – September 2, 2009)
- Michail Grobman, Israel. "The Metamorphoses of Collage," Moscow Museum of Modern Art
- Bertrand Lavier, France. AFTERMOON
- Atelier Van Lieshout, Netherlands. "Slave City," Moscow Contemporary Art Center WINZAVOD
- Vladimir Tarasov, Russia. "Sound Games," Multimedia Art Museum
- Luc Tuymans, Belgium. "Against the Day," Baibakov Art Projects, Red October (former chocolate factory)

=== Special projects ===
- 40 lives of one space, Red October.
- American Communists in Moscow, Walking Tours
- Art Digital 6: The Others, M'ARS
- Art on Site, National Centre for Contemporary Arts.
- Art or Death Society of Artists, Moscow Museum of Modern Art.
- Brutally Yours
- By Hook or by Crook, PROEKT_FABRIKA.
- Capitalism as Religion, The State Central Museum for Contemporary History of Russia
- Dormitory District, Volzhskaya metro station
- Drumpainting, Moscow Contemporary Art Center WINZAVOD, Atelier No.2 Gallery
- Evolution Haute Couture. Art and Science in the Post-Biological Age. LABORATORIA Art&Science Space
- Face. Image. Time. EKATERINA Cultural Foundation
- Feedbacks. WINZAVOD Contemporary art center
- Focus on Korea. M'ARS, Tsereteli Art Gallery.
- Generation Z. Investment in Art Club
- Gastarbeiters of Spirit. PROEKT_FABRIKA
- Christoph Broich: The girl who sold her soul to the Devil and won. Spiridonov House
- Interpreting Object in the Moscow Conceptual School. PROEKT_FABRIKA.
- Kudymkor – Engine of the Future. WINZAVOD, Proun Gallery
- Labors Movement. PROEKT_FABRIKA.
- M'ARTian Fields. M'ARS
- 'Spatial Liturgy. Curator: Oleg Kulik. TsUM
- Moscow Time - homage to Dmitry Prigov. Rudomino State Library for Foreign Literature
- New Old Cold War. Red October.
- Not Toys, The State Tretyakov Gallery
- Perspective Machine. BAIBAKOV art projects, Red October
- Place. Time... Boris Mikhailov. Curator: Olga Sviblova
- Red - Red, Red October.
- Russian Povera, Red October. Curator: Marat Guelman
- Second Dialog. Tsereteli Art Gallery
- Show and Tell. An Artist and His Model. Stella Art Foundation.
- The Situation. Gallery on Solyanka
- Revolution per Minute, Red October
- Swedish Family. Moscow Museum of Modern Art
- Thomas Joshua Cooper and Bill Fontana, GMG Gallery
- Ultra-New Materiality. Moscow Museum of Modern Art
- Video Notes, Moscow International Performing Arts Center
- Vulnerability, RSUH Museum center
- Wall Bars. Hand-Walker Sculpture. Moscow Museum of Modern Art
- Wonder World. Expecting a restless future. EKATERINA Cultural Foundation.
- Workshop of Feminine Creation. Moscow Museum of Modern Art

=== Parallel program ===
There was also a parallel program of exhibitions at Triumph Gallery, Winzavod, Zverev Center of Contemporary Art, Moscow Museum of Modern Art, The Lumiere Brothers Photogallery, The State Literary Museum, One Spectator's Gallery, Praktika Theater, Pop/off/art Gallery, Regina Gallery, RuArts Gallery, State Museum of Alexander Pushkin, Design center ARTPLAY, State Museum of Contemporary Arts of the Russian Academy of Arts, The State Literary Museum, Fine Art Gallery, Kino Gallery, Instituto Cervantes de Moscu, Open Gallery, Vostochnaya gallery, The State Literary Museum, Aidan Gallery, Proekt Fabrika, Ravenscourt Galleries, Russian Academy of Arts, Red October, Petr Vois Gallery, Photographer.ru, Moscow Zoo (Exhibition Hall), State Tretyakov Gallery, VP Studio, Kovcheg Gallery, State Museum of Contemporary Arts of the Russian Academy of Arts, ARTPLAY, Schusev State Museum of Architecture, Elena Vrublevskaya Gallery, National Centre for Contemporary Arts, XL Gallery, GP, Arka Gallery (ЦЕХ V), Pobeda Gallery, Krokin Gallery, L-gallery, and M&J Guelman Gallery.

== Fourth Moscow Biennale of Contemporary Art ==
The Fourth Moscow Biennale of Contemporary Art was curated by Peter Weibel, a curator, artist, media arts theorist, and director of the Center of Art and Media Technology (ZKM) in Karlsruhe (Germany). It took place from September to October 2011. Joseph Backstein was confirmed as the Biennale's Commissioner and Artistic Director.
