= Calvert 22 Foundation =

Non-profit UK registered institution

- Formation: May 2009
- Type: Nonprofit organization think tank
- Headquarters: Somerset House; London, WC2R 1LA
- Director: Nonna Materkova
- Website: calvert22.org

Calvert 22 Foundation was a non-profit UK registered charity created in 2009 by Leningrad-born, London-based economist Nonna Materkova. Calvert 22 Foundation focused on the contemporary culture and creativity of the 29 countries of the New East (eastern Europe, Russia, the Balkans and Central Asia) through education, events, exhibitions, research, and online content in The Calvert Journal. Since the 2022 Russian invasion of Ukraine, it ceased operations until further notice.

== Mission ==
Calvert 22 Foundation's mission was to build opportunities for emerging creative talent in the New East by supporting and showcasing the contemporary culture and creative economy of the region and deepening knowledge through in-depth research and analysis.

== Activities ==
The foundation's first initiative was Calvert 22 Gallery in London (since 2016 called Calvert 22 Space). The not-for-profit hosted events, talks, screenings and exhibitions on history, photography, film, music, architecture, literature and contemporary art of the region. It was also the foundation's headquarters. Set across two floors on a converted warehouse, the gallery's name was derived from its address on Calvert Avenue in Shoreditch, East London, which is historically connected to immigrants from Eastern Europe.

The foundation partnered and collaborated with other cultural institutions—Tate Modern, State Hermitage Museum, the Victoria and Albert Museum, The Photographers' Gallery, the Science Museum, the British Council, the Barbican Centre, London Fashion Week, London Book Festival, the London Festival of Architecture and the London Design Festival among others.

From its early years, Calvert 22 Foundation worked closely with universities in the UK and internationally, including the universities of Oxford, Cambridge, Edinburgh, University College London, and the Royal College of Art. In 2012, the foundation established a partnership with Smolny College (the Faculty of Liberal Arts and Sciences of St Petersburg State University) to enable student and lecturer exchange programmes, visits, and conferences.

2013 saw the creation of Calvert Forum, a creative industries think tank generating forums, talks and reports researching the role of creative enterprise on economic and social development in the New East region. In 2016, the Calvert 22 Foundation launched its long-term collaboration with PricewaterhouseCoopers (now PwC) to develop and publish the Creative Capital Index.

In May 2016, the foundation established the New East Photo Prize, for "representations of the social, cultural and physical landscape of the New East and other perspectives on that region," and presented the prize's inaugural exhibition from November to December 2016.

In 2017, Calvert 22 Foundation dedicated a year-long season of events, art and digital content to marking the centenary of the Russian Revolution entitled The Future Remains: Revisiting Revolution in partnership with St Petersburg's Hermitage Museum.

The New East Travel Guide is the foundation's mobile app, "that connects city travellers to the creative and cultural side of the New East". Locations currently included are Moscow, St Petersburg, Sochi, Kazan, Voronezh and Tbilisi.

In 2022, the Calvert 22 Foundation announced the closure of operations, and the ceasing of its publication The Calvert Journal, citing the safety of their staff and colleagues amid threats to media freedom in Russia. Later that year, Russia designated Calvert 22 Foundation as an "undesirable organisation". Until 2017, the foundation had been backed by Russian state-owned VTB Bank. Until 2022, Chairman of the Accounts Chamber Alexei Kudrin had been a member of the board of trustees.

== Calvert 22 Space ==
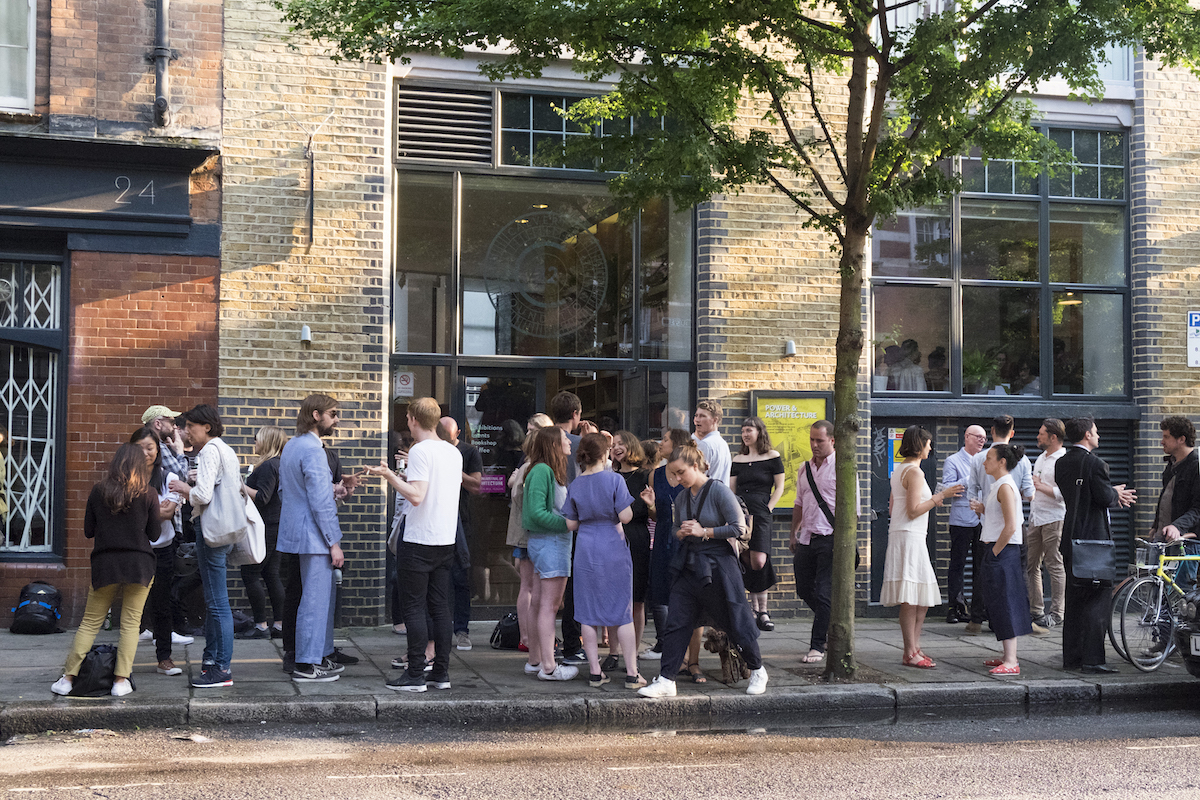
Calvert 22 Space

Since its opening in 2009, Calvert 22 Space staged exhibitions of over 1,500 artists and photographers from the New East. They included Sanja Iveković, Alexander Brodsky, Neue Slowenische Kunst, and Olga Chernysheva. Curators of exhibitions included Lina Dzuverović, David Thorp, David Elliott, Kate Bush, Isaac Julian, Mark Nash, Joseph Backstein and Yara Bubnova. Calvert 22 Space was home to the Calvert 22 Bookshop and the Calvert 22 Café, which hosted pop-ups, supper clubs and book launches.

The photography exhibition, Close and Far, held at Calvert 22 Space was named by The Guardian as one of the 10 best photography exhibitions in the world in 2014.

Calvert 22 Space closed in December 2018 moving most of its activities online. The foundation continued to hold events and exhibitions with partner institutions in the UK and internationally.

== The Calvert Journal ==
In 2013, the foundation launched The Calvert Journal, a digital magazine of contemporary New East culture, including art, film, architecture, design, fashion and avant-garde culture. It was updated daily with reportage, comment and photography, by an editorial team in London and a network of contributors in the New East. Initially launched with a Russian focus, The Calvert Journal since broadened its scope to include all 29 countries in the New East region.
