= Rosa Martínez (curator) =

Rosa Martínez (b. 1955, Soria, Spain) is an independent curator, art critic and international art advisor based in Barcelona, Spain.

== Career ==
As an independent curator, Rosa Martínez has organised international exhibitions, including the 51st Venice Biennale with "Always a Little Further" at the Arsenale (2005). The title of this exhibition was taken from a Corto Maltese book written by the Venetian-writer Hugo Pratt. In her curatorial statement Martínez elaborates on this by stating: "Taking a fictional character as inspiration is a way of affirming that art is an imaginary construct and that fantasy helps us towards a better understanding of reality".

Additionally, in 1997 she curated the 5th International Istanbul Biennial "On Life, Beauty, Translations and other Difficulties" and curated the exhibition "Chacun à son gout", which celebrated the 10th anniversary of the Guggenheim Museum Bilbao (2007).

As an art advisor, Rosa Martínez has broadened the collection of the Istanbul Museum of Modern Art, where she was the Chief Curator from 2004 to 2007. Her collaboration with the Guggenheim Museum Bilbao in 2007 helped to update its contemporary collection, including works by outstanding young artists. In 2009, Martínez contributed to a publication that shed light on significant works from the Guggenheim Museum Bilbao collection in different historical and artistic contexts.

As an art critic, she is a regular contributor to several newspapers and art journals, notably Le Monde diplomatique en español, Flash Art International, El País, Atlántica, Letra Internacional and La Guía del Ocio. She has also written numerous essays for artists' catalogues.

== Exhibitions ==
=== International biennials ===
- 1988-1992: Director of the Barcelona Biennial and coordinator of Barcelona's participation in the Mediterranean Biennials held in Bologna (Italy), Salonika (Greece), Marseille (France) and Tipasa (Algeria).
- 1996: Co-curator of Manifesta I, Rotterdam (Netherlands), together with Viktor Misiano, Katalin Neray, Hans Ulrich Obrist and Andrew Renton.
- 1997: Artistic Director of "On Life, Beauty, Translations and Other Difficulties", 5th International Istanbul Biennial, Istanbul (Turkey).
- 1999: Curator of "Looking for a Place", the 3rd International SITE Santa Fe Biennial, Santa Fe, New Mexico (U.S.A.).
- 2000: Curator of "Friends and Neighbours", Biennial EVA 2000, Limerick (Ireland).
- 2000: Co-curator of "Leaving the Island", 2nd Busan Biennale, Metropolitan Art Museum of Busan (Korea), together with Young Chul Lee and Hou Hanru.
- 2001-2003: International advisor for the Echigo-Tsumari Triennial (Japan).
- 2003: Curator of the Spanish Pavilion, Venice Biennale.
- 2005: Director of Venice Biennale
- 2005: Co-curator of the First Moscow Biennale together with Joseph Backstein, Daniel Birnbaum, Nicolas Bourriaud, Iara Boubnova and Hans Ulrich Obrist.
- 2006: Co-curator of the 27th São Paulo Art Biennial (São Paulo, Brazil).
- 2007: Co-curator of the 2nd Moscow Biennale (Moscow, Russia).
- 2026: Curator of 2nd Malta Biennale (Clean | Clear | Cut)

=== Group shows ===
- 2000: Co-curator of "Living and Working in Vienna", Kunsthalle Wien, Vienna, (Austria), together with Paulo Herkenhoff and Maaretta Jaukkuri.
- 2001-2002: Co-curator of "Trans Sexual Express Barcelona 2001: A Classic for the Third Millennium", Santa Monica Art Centre, Barcelona (Spain), together with Xabier Arakistain. Travelling show going to Kunsthalle Mücsarnok (Budapest, Hungary) in January 2002, and to Kiosko Alfonso (La Coruña, Spain) in April 2002.
- 2002-1998: Curator of the International Project Rooms at ARCO, the International Contemporary Art Fair, Madrid (Spain), together with Octavio Zaya and various guest curators.
- 2002: Curator of "The Song of the Pirate", Centro Cultural Andratx (Mallorca, Spain).
- 2002: Curator of "The Hall of Lost Steps", Borusan Art Center (Istanbul, Turkey).
- 2003: Curator of "COPYRIGHT: EUROPE EXISTS" (together with Harald Szeemann), Macedonian Museum of Contemporary Art, Thessaloniki, Greece.
- 2003: Curator of "Universal Strangers", Borusan Art Center (Istanbul, Turkey)* 2005–2007: Video programs at Istanbul Modern: “Video program 2” (April–July 2005); “Nothing Lasts for Ever” (February–May 2006); “Painting as a Way of Living (May–August 2006), “Is this Fiction?” (February–May 2007), “... And Dreams are Dreams” (May–August, 2007)
- 2005: Co-curator of “Here comes the Sun” with Daniel Birnbaum, Jerome Sans and Sarit Shapira. Magasin 3 Stockholm Konsthall, Stockholm (Sweden).
- 2005: “Centre of Gravity”, Istanbul Modern, Istanbul (Turkey).
- 2007-2008: “Chacun à son Goût”, Guggenheim Museum Bilbao, Bilbao (Spain).
- 2006: “Venice-Istanbul”, Istanbul Modern, Istanbul (Turkey).
- 2007: “Time Present – Time Past”, co-curated with David Elliott, Istanbul Modern, Istanbul (Turkey)
- 2011: "TRA. EDGE OF BECOMING", Palazzo Fortuny. Venice. (Italy) co-curated with Daniela Ferretti, Francesco Poli and Axel Vervoordt.
- 2012–2013: "What To Think. What To Desire. What To Do", Caixaforum Barcelona (Spain).
- 2015–2016: "Fear Nothing, She Says", National Museum of Sculpture, Valladolid (Spain).
- 2017: "Intimacy is Political", MetQuito - Centro Cultural Metropolitano, Quito (Ecuador).
- 2018: "CONSTELLATION MALTA", closing multi-site exhibition of Valletta as European Capital of Culture, Mlta.
- 2019: "In the name of the Father", Picaso Museum, Barcelona, Spain
- 2019: "Pedes in Terra ad Sidera Visum", José María Cano and Francisco de Zurbarán, Museo Nacional de Arte Antiga, Lisboa (Portugal)
- 2020: "Apostolados", J.M. Cano and Domenikos Theotocopouli El Greco, Sacristía of the Toledo Cathedral, Spain.

=== Solo shows ===
- 1992: Curator of the season "5 Values for the Next Millennium" at la Caixa Foundation's Sala Montcada (Barcelona, Spain) presenting solo shows of: Juan Urrios, Sergio Caballero, Patrick van Caeckenbergh, Marcel.lí Antúnez, Nan Goldin and Jana Sterbak.
- 1997: Curator of the season "The Meteors" at La Caixa Foundation's Sala Montcada (Barcelona, Spain) presenting solo shows of: Akane Asaoka, Sam Taylor-Wood, Ana Laura Aláez and Irwin.
- 1999: Curator of "Jean-Michel Othoniel", Sala Rekalde, Bilbao (Spain) and Palacio de los Condes de Gabia, Granada (Spain)
- 1999: Curator of "Bülent Sangar", museum in progress, Vienna (Austria)
- 2001: Curator of three urban interventions by Ghada Amer, Santiago Sierra and Sergio Vega in the context of "Experiences, Barcelona Art Report 2001", Barcelona (Spain).
- 2003: Curator of three solo shows by Ghada Amer, Shirin Neshat and Oleg Kulik, Galeria Filomena Soares, Lisbon (Portugal).
- 2003: Curator of "Nedko Solakov: Romantic Landscapes with missing Parts", Espacio 1, MNCARS, Madrid (Spain).* 2004: Pilar Albarracín, Reales Atarazanas de Sevilla (Spain)
- 2004: “Nikos Navridis”, Sala de exposiciones de la Fundación la Caixa, Madrid.
- 2008: Anish Kapoor: "Islamic Mirror", Convent of las Claras, Murcia (Spain).

== Selected articles ==
- 1995: “Arte: hágalo usted mismo”, Lápiz, February.
- 1997: “Istanbul Biennial, Curatorial Interpretations”, Flash Art, November–December. pp 98–100.
- 1998: “Art Collecting. Interview with Nancy and Robert Magoon.” ARCO Noticias, nº 12
- 1998: “Guggenheim Bilbao. What lies behind the titanium esplendor?”, Flash Art, Jan-Feb.
- 1999: "En Primera Línea. CREAM: Cien artistas para un nuevo siglo", El País de las Tentaciones, El País, May 7.
- 1999: “Of Course, Intensity and Art can Change the World. A Conversation between Harald Szeemann and Rosa Martínez”, Lápiz, nº 150. January–February.
- 1999: “Carta desde Estambul”, Letra Internacional, nº 60. Madrid, Spain.
- 2000: "In the Society of Spectacle You are Always an Employee: Never the Owner of the Show", Trans, New York, nº 7, May.
- 2000: “Buscando otros lugares: el arte como asistencia social", Archipiélago, cuadernos de crítica de la cultura, Barcelona, nº 41. April–May.
- 2000: “On Love, New Feminism and Power”, Atlántica, nº 26.
- 2001: "Some Islands: International Project Rooms ARCO'01", ARCO Noticias, Madrid, nº 20, April.
- 2002: "Is there fear of discussing the basic moral, philosophical and the aesthetic tenents behind the current avant-garde in art?", The Art Newspaper, London, nº 123, March.
- 2006: “Women in Art. A Politically Unbalanced Relationship”, Quaderns de la Mediterrània, 7. European Institute of the Mediterranean, Barcelona.
- 2010-2011: Collaborator for the "Images" section of Le Monde Diplomatique en español.
