= Julius Popp =

German artist

Julius Popp (born 1973, Nuremberg) is an artist based in Leipzig.

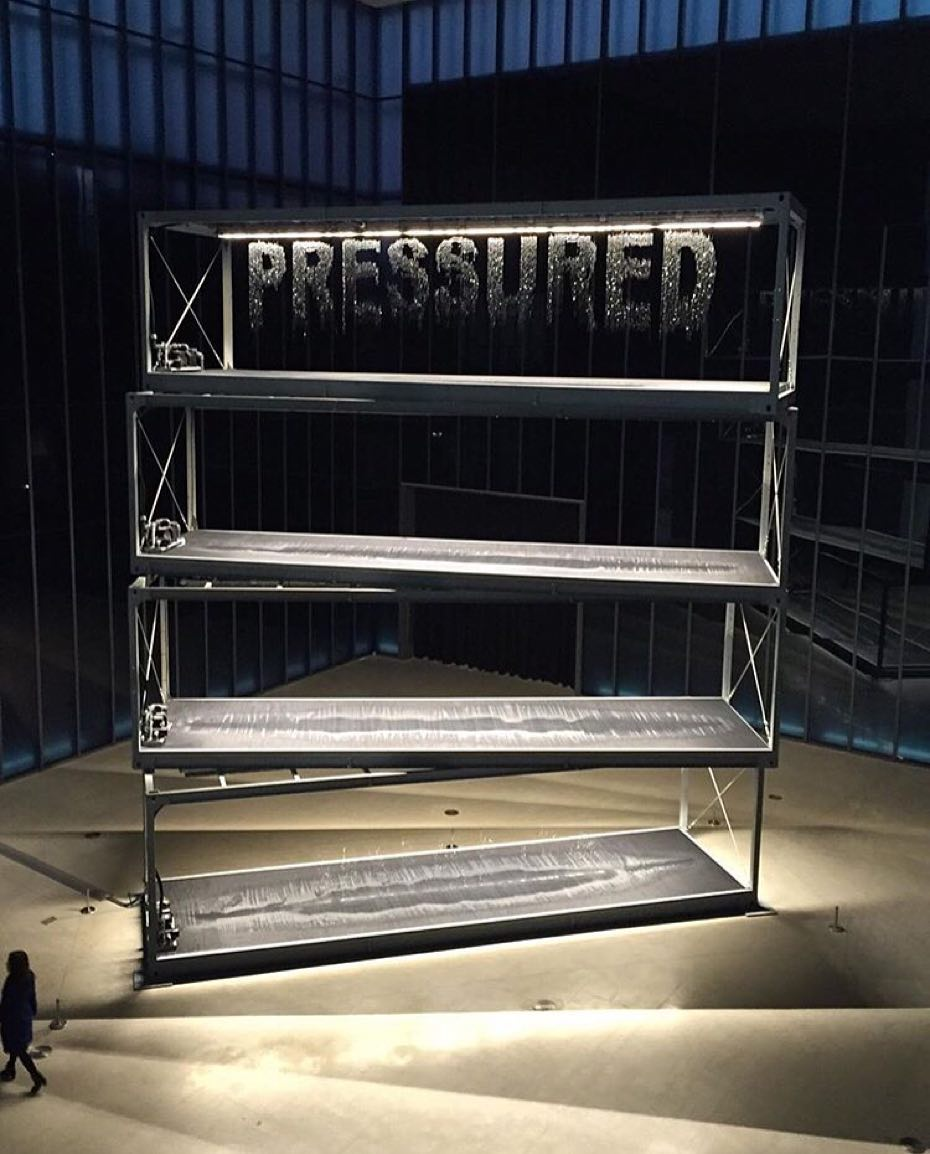
Bit.Fall Pulse, National Museum of Modern and Contemporary Art, Seoul, Korean Air Box Project 2015

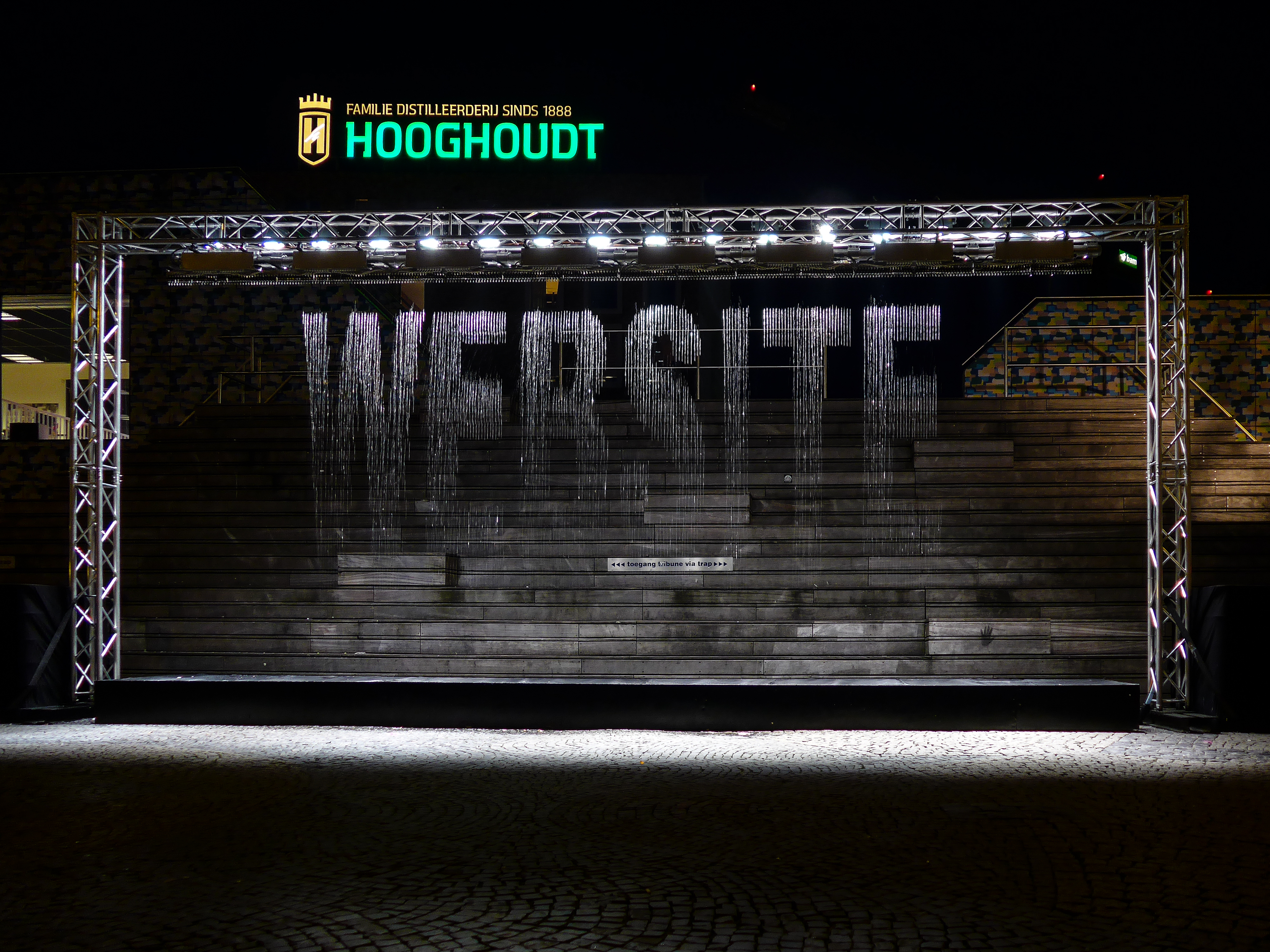
bit.fall in the Dutch city of Groningen (2014)

His work often uses technology, resulting in interdisciplinary ventures which reach across the boundaries of art and science. An example of Popp's work is Bitfall (2005): a machine which displays words selected from the internet via drops of falling water in precise configuration, each word visible only for a second. A bit.fall installation was at the London 2012 Olympic Park under the footbridge between the main entrance and stadium, the words generated using water from the Waterworks River were chosen at random from internet news feeds.

Popp studied at the Hochschule für Grafik und Buchkunst in Leipzig

== Selected exhibitions ==
- 2017 "BIT.FALL" Pacific Place, Hong Kong
- 2011 I/O/I. The senses of machines (Interaction Laboratory) Disseny Hub Barcelona
- 2009 Moscow Biennale of Contemporary Art
- 2007 Oboro, Montreal
- 2005 Psychoscape, Kunsthalle, Budapest
- 2005 D-Haus, Tokyo
- 2005 ICHIM, Transmissions, Paris
- 2005 Union Gallery, London (with Oliver Kossack, Julia Schmidt)
- 2004 50% Realität, Kunstraum B/2, Leipzig
- 2004 Artexpo, New York
- 2003 Artbots - The Robot Talent Show, Eyebeam Gallery, New York City
- 2002 Paradies, Halle/Saale
- 2001 Heimat L.E., organised by Galerie für zeitgenössische Kunst and HGB, Leipzig

== Awards ==
- 2009 - LVZ Kunstpreis, Leipzig
