= Baibakov Art Projects =

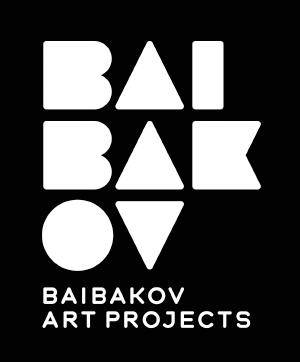
BAIBAKOV art projects logo

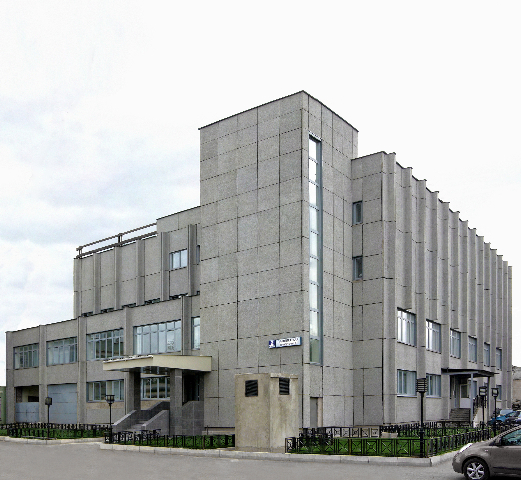
BAIBAKOV art projects new home at Paveletskaya Naberezhnaya 2/18

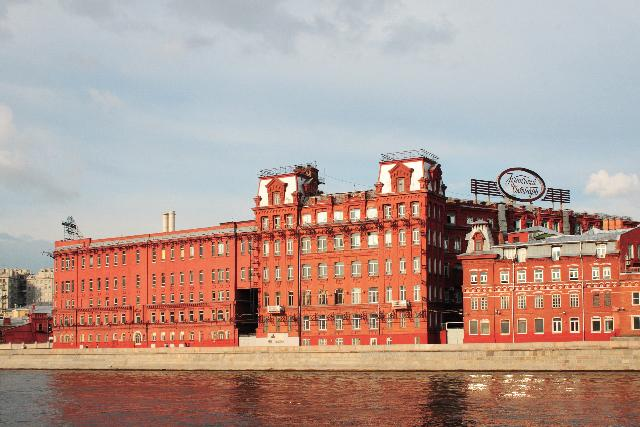
Red October chocolate factory

Maria Baibakova

Baibakov Art Projects is a non-profit organization that aims to provide platforms for cultural production primarily within Moscow.

== History ==
Founded in 2008, the initiative was the first to make use of the former Red October Chocolate Factory in the center of Moscow. Baibakov Art Projects inaugurated its 3000m2 space with an exhibition called invasion : evasion, which challenged 22 Russian artists and collectives (including Gosha Ostretsov, Ira Korina, Dmitry Teselkin and Alina Gutkina) to launch a creative invasion of the exhibition space. It followed this exhibition with "Natural Wonders: New Art from London," a show which likewise featured a showcase of 22 artists and collectives based in London (among them Idris Khan, Conrad Shawcross, Ryan Gander and Shezad Dawood.) Later, Baibakov Art Projects would go on to host exhibitions of artists like Luc Tuymans, Paul Pfeiffer, and Olga Chernysheva as well as group shows like FIVE, which featured Walead Beshty, Matthew Brannon, Wade Guyton, Sterling Ruby and Kelley Walker.

In April 2010, Baibakov Art Projects relocated to a former House of Culture at Paveletskaya Naberezhnaya 2/18, where it hosted the exhibition Perpetual Battles, curated by Baibakova with Kate Sutton and Jean-Max Colard. The show featured work by artists including Thomas Hirschhorn, Cyprien Gaillard, Latifa Echakhch and Saadane Afif. Concurrently, Baibakov Art Projects hosted 032c's Workshop Report an exhibition that displayed works by Cyprien Gaillard, Andro Wekua, Gosha Rubchinskiy and Carsten Holler on Konstatin Grcic tables, set up on a Missoni carpet. Following the exhibition, Baibakov Art Projects began to operate using pop-up spaces, such as Dom Spiridonov, where they hosted a launch for Visionaire's Fairy Tales in October 2010.
