= Joseph Backstein =

Russian curator, art critic and sociologist of culture (1945–2024)

- Иосиф Маркович Бакштейн
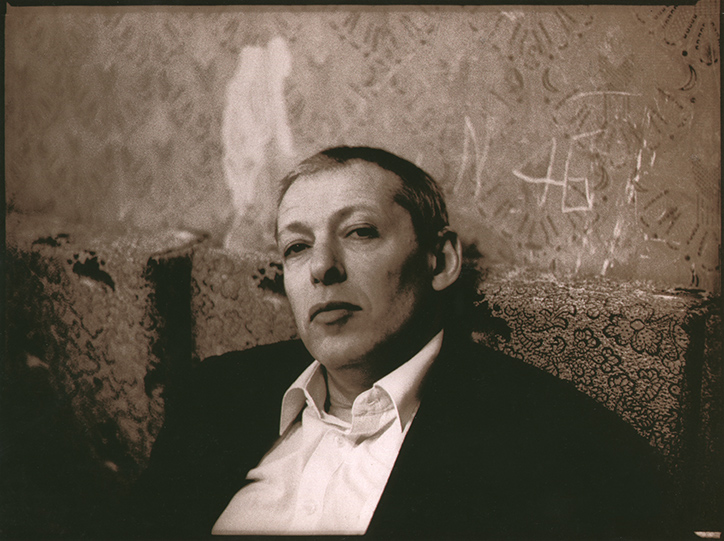
- Backstein in 1995
- Born: September 21, 1945; Moscow, Soviet Union
- Died: January 12, 2024 (aged 78); London, England
- Resting place: Novo Vostriakovskoye Jewish Cemetery, Moscow
- Education: Moscow Institute of Electronic Machine Building; Institute of Sociology, USSR Academy of Sciences; Honorary Doctorate, University of Gothenburg (2007)
- Occupations: Curator; art critic; sociologist of culture
- Years active: 1987–2024
- Known for: Moscow International Biennale of Contemporary Art; Institute of Contemporary Art, Moscow
- Spouses: Katya Kompaneyets (m. 1971–1974); Irina Nakhova (m. 1982–1990); Katy Deepwell (m. 2001)

Joseph Markovich Backstein (Russian: Ио́сиф Ма́ркович Бакште́йн; born Bokshtein; 21 September 1945 – 12 January 2024) was a Russian curator, art critic and sociologist of culture. He founded the Institute of Contemporary Art Moscow and played a leading role in the Moscow International Biennale of Contemporary Art from its founding in 2005, curating its first two editions (2005 and 2007) and serving as its commissioner from 2007 until his resignation in 2016.

He played a central role in the institutional development of contemporary art in post-Soviet Russia and in establishing international networks for Russian contemporary artists. Backstein was repeatedly named among the fifty most influential figures in Russian art in the annual ranking published by the magazine ArtChronika.

== Early life and education ==
Backstein was born Iosif Markovich Bokshtein in Moscow on 21 September 1945, the son of the artist Mark Iosifovich Bokshtein (1904–1958) and the biologist Rakhil Lazarevna Mitropolitanskaya (1906–1987). His cousin was the mathematician Meer Feliksovich Bokshtein (1913–1990).

He graduated from the Moscow Institute of Electronic Machine Building in 1968. From 1969 to 1974 he was a researcher at the Institute of Economics and Mathematics of the USSR Academy of Sciences, and from 1974 to 1991 at the Institute for Industrial Design in Moscow. During this period he increasingly became involved in Moscow's unofficial artistic and intellectual circles.

In 1985 Backstein completed postgraduate studies at the Institute of Sociology of the Academy of Sciences of the USSR, where he received the degree of Candidate of Philosophical Sciences for research in the sociology of art and culture. In 2007 he received an honorary doctorate from the University of Gothenburg, Sweden.

In the 1970s and 1980s he was associated with a circle of Moscow artists and intellectuals that included Alexander Melamid, Vitaly Komar, Vladimir Paperny, Andrei Monastyrski and Ilya Kabakov. He participated in actions organised by the Collective Actions group, an important formation in Moscow Conceptualism.

== Professional career ==
From 1991 Backstein was senior research staff at the Institute for Cultural Studies of the Russian Academy of Sciences, heading its Department of Contemporary Culture from 2003 to 2013. From 2001 to 2010 he was deputy general director and artistic director of the State Museum and Exhibition Centre ROSIZO.

During the 1990s and 2000s he also held a number of positions in cultural institutions and advisory bodies: he was a member of the Visual Arts Board of the Ministry of Culture of the Russian Federation and a board member of the Art Moscow festival from 1996 to 2002, an expert for the Soros Foundation from 1997 to 2000, a consultant for the 20th-century collection of the Tretyakov Gallery in 2000, and a member of the advisory council of the Victoria Art Foundation from 2009. He also served on numerous international juries and selection committees, including for the Kandinsky Prize, the Innovation Prize, the Sovereign European Art Prize and the nominating committee for Documenta 13 (2008), and held curatorial residencies and research fellowships in Finland, the United Kingdom and the United States between 2000 and 2003.

== Curatorial work ==
Backstein began curating in 1987 at the Club of Avant-Garde Artists (CLAVA). That same year he organised the performance project Steamship-87, and in 1988 he staged an exhibition at the Sandunovskie Baths in Moscow. In 1992 he organised another exhibition inside Butyrka prison.

His first trip abroad was to Berlin in 1988, where he helped organise the first edition of the exhibition series IsKUNSTvo, shown in Moscow, West Berlin and, in later editions, Stockholm. These projects marked the beginning of his international curatorial activity and long-term collaborations with Western museums and institutions.

== Institute of Contemporary Art ==
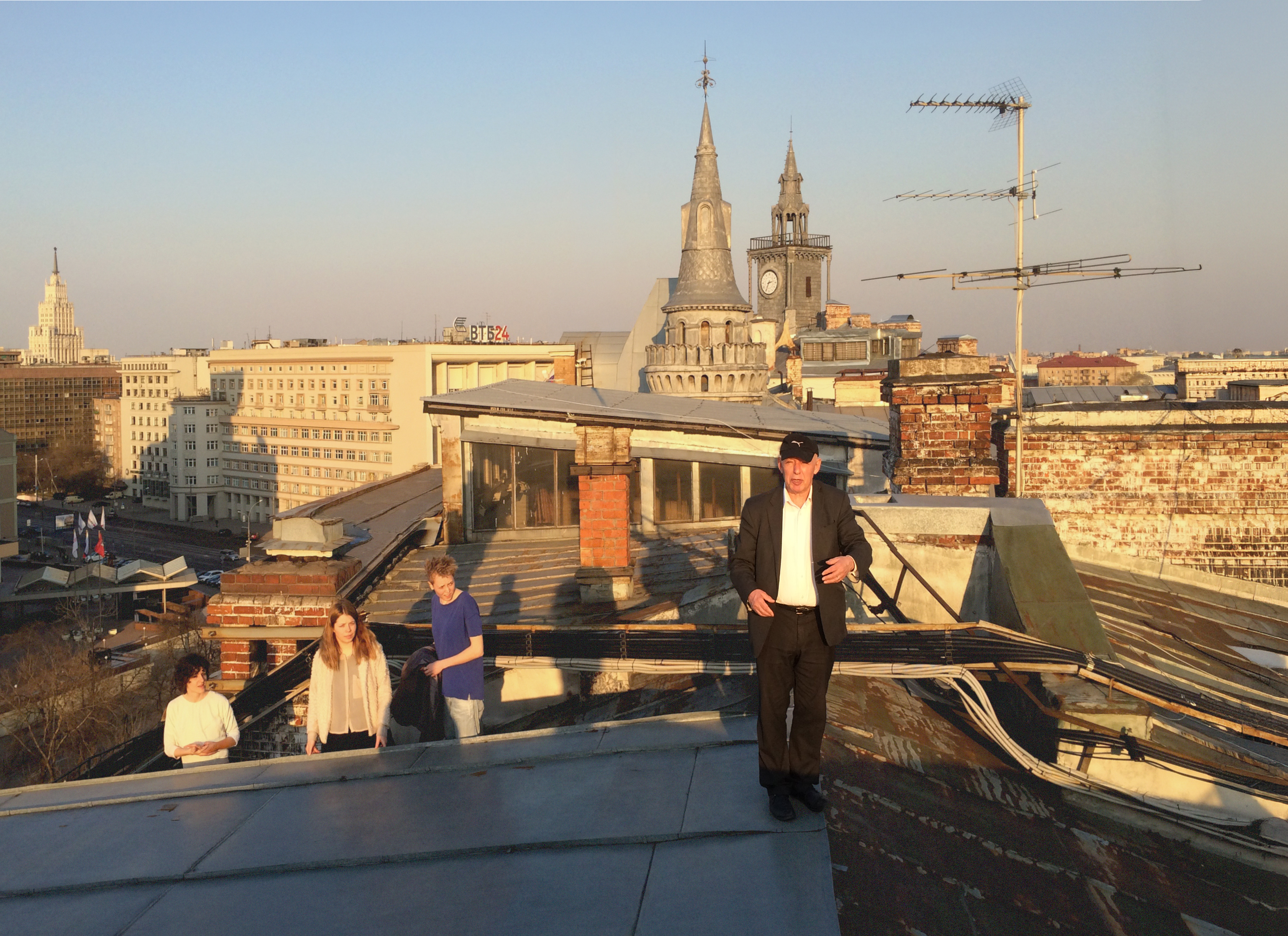
Joseph Backstein with ICA students on the roof of Ilya Kabakov's former studio on Sretensky Boulevard, Moscow, 2014

Backstein founded the Institute of Contemporary Art Moscow in 1991; it was formally re-registered as the Institute for Contemporary Art Problems in 2001 and, in his honour, renamed the Joseph Backstein Institute of Contemporary Art in 2018. Its core teaching programme was known as New Art Strategies. The institute combined postgraduate education, curatorial training and public programmes, becoming one of the principal centres for contemporary art education in Russia.

The school occupied Ilya Kabakov's former studio on Sretensky Boulevard from the 1990s until 2018. Its alumni included Viktor Alimpiev, Anna Zholud, Elena Kovylina, Irina Korina, Olya Kroytor, Pavel Otdelnov and Rostan Tavasiev.

== International career ==
After the dissolution of the Soviet Union, Backstein worked to bring Russian non-conformist and conceptualist art to audiences abroad. In 1990–1991 he co-curated the touring exhibition Between Spring and Summer: Soviet Conceptual Art in the Era of Late Communism with David A. Ross, Elisabeth Sussman and Margarita Tupitsyn, shown at the Tacoma Art Museum, the Institute of Contemporary Art, Boston, and the Des Moines Art Center — the first large-scale exhibition of Russian art staged in the United States. This was followed by the touring exhibition Perspectives on Conceptualism, shown in the United States in 1991–1993.

He curated the Russian pavilion at the 1999 Venice Biennale, presenting Komar and Melamid's Collaboration with Animals and Yuri Albert, and also worked on the Russian contribution to Manifesta 4 (2002) and the 25th São Paulo Biennial (2002, featuring Sergey Bratkov). During the 2000s he brought internationally known artists to Moscow, including Christian Boltanski, Antony Gormley, Norman Foster and Yoko Ono. He also served on international juries and advisory boards for contemporary art exhibitions and institutions.

== Moscow Biennale ==
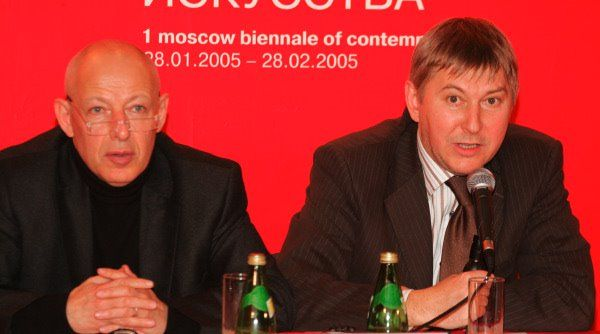
Joseph Backstein (left) and Evgeny Zyablov at the press conference on July 6, 2004

Backstein is best known as a founder of the Moscow International Biennale of Contemporary Art. He curated the main project of the Biennale's first two editions, in 2005 and 2007, alongside Daniel Birnbaum, Iara Boubnova, Nicolas Bourriaud, Rosa Martínez, Hans Ulrich Obrist and (in 2005) Robert Storr; the 2007 team was joined by Fulya Erdemci and Gunnar B. Kvaran. He served as the Biennale's commissioner from 2007 until his resignation in 2016. The first edition opened in 2005 at the former Lenin Museum, and later editions were staged at a series of Moscow venues, including Federation Tower, the building that later became the Jewish Museum and Tolerance Center, Artplay, the Manege and VDNKH.

Backstein resigned as commissioner in 2016, following the Biennale's sixth edition in 2015. In later interviews he said that he could no longer continue working on the biennale and that its future format and organisational structure were under discussion.

== Later career and writing ==
In 2015 Backstein co-curated, with Maria Nasimova and Grigory Kazovsky, the section on Conceptual art and Sots Art for the exhibition Contemporaries of the Future: Jewish Artists in the Russian Avant-Garde, 1910s–1980s at the Jewish Museum and Tolerance Center. He also served on the museum's Academic Council.

== Awards and recognition ==
Backstein became a member of the Union of Artists of Russia in 1988 and of the International Association of Art Critics (AICA) in 1995. He received the Federation of Jewish Communities of Russia's "Man of the Year" award in 2008. In 2007 he was elected a corresponding member of the Russian Academy of Arts. He was repeatedly ranked among the fifty most influential figures in Russian contemporary art by the magazine ArtChronika, including in its 2010, 2011 and 2012 rankings.

Other awards and recognition included:

2013 – Hubert Winter Prize, Vienna Art Fair.

2017 – Montblanc de la Culture Arts Patronage Award.

2018 – Sergey Kuryokhin Contemporary Art Award for Best Text on Contemporary Art for Статьи и диалоги (Articles and Dialogues).

2018 – Honorary prize for contribution to the development of contemporary art, "Innovation" State Prize in Contemporary Art (Государственная премия «Инновация»), awarded by the V-A-C Foundation and the Moscow Museum of Modern Art.

2019 – Nominated for the Kandinsky Prize in the category of contemporary art history and theory books for Статьи и диалоги (2017).

== Personal life ==
Backstein was married three times. His first marriage was to the artist Katya Kompaneyets, from 1971 to 1974, in Moscow. In 1982 he married the artist Irina Nakhova; they remained married until 1990. In 2001 he married Katy Deepwell, a London-based art historian and critic, and they remained married until his death in 2024. He had four children: Yelena Kompaneyets, Marc Kompaneyets, Maxim Jablonski and Jacob Deepwell Backstein.

== Death and legacy ==
Backstein died in London on 12 January 2024 and was buried in Moscow on 19 January 2024. A memorial event dedicated to Backstein was held during Art Moscow in April 2024. In 2025 Pushkin House in London organised a public event devoted to his curatorial legacy.

His personal library of around 4,000 books, catalogues and periodicals has been preserved through the GES-2 House of Culture and is now held at the Jewish Museum and Tolerance Center in Moscow. His archive is held at the Pushkin State Museum of Fine Arts.

== Principal curatorial projects ==
- 1987 – Creative Atmosphere and the Artistic Process, the first exhibition of the Avant-Garde Club (CLAVA), Moscow (co-curated with Sven Gundlach).
- 1987 – Steamship-87 (performance project), Moscow.
- 1988 – IsKUNSTvo, Moscow and West Berlin (co-curated with Liza Schmitz), one of the early international exhibitions of Soviet unofficial art; the series continued in Moscow (1989) and Stockholm (1990).
- 1988 – Bathhouse, exhibition project at the Sandunovskie Baths, Moscow (co-curated with Gia Abramishvili).
- 1990–1991 – Between Spring and Summer: Soviet Conceptual Art in the Era of Late Communism, Tacoma Art Museum; Institute of Contemporary Art, Boston; Des Moines Art Center (co-curated with David A. Ross, Elisabeth Sussman and Margarita Tupitsyn).
- 1991 – MANI Museum (co-curated with Sergey Romashko), Karmeliterkloster, Frankfurt am Main.
- 1991–1993 – Perspectives on Conceptualism, PS1 Clocktower Gallery, New York, and other venues in the United States.
- 1992 – Exhibition of Moscow Conceptualists, Butyrka prison, Moscow.
- 1992 – Illustration as a Way to Survive: Ülo Sooster – Ilya Kabakov, Kanaal Art Foundation, Kortrijk, Belgium (co-curated with M. Catherine de Zegher).
- 1993 – Stalin's Choice: Soviet Socialist Realism, 1932–1956, PS1, New York (co-curated with Kathrin Becker, Zdenka Gabalova and Alanna Heiss).
- 1993 – Monumental Propaganda, Institute of Contemporary Art, Moscow, and World Financial Center, New York (project instigated by Komar and Melamid).
- 1994 – Monuments: Transformations for the Future, Kunstihoone, Tallinn, Estonia (co-curated with Vera Pogodina and Johannes Saar).
- 1996 – Collective Action, Exit Art, New York (co-curated with Elena Elagina).
- 1997 – It's a Better World: Russian Actionism and Its Context, Vienna Secession, Vienna (co-curated with Johanna Kandl).
- 1998 – Medialization, Edsvik Art Centre, Stockholm, Sweden.
- 1999 – Russian Pavilion at the 48th Venice Biennale, featuring Komar and Melamid and Yuri Albert.
- 2001 – On the Way to the Screen, Central House of Artists, Moscow (co-curated with Viktor Misiano).
- 2002 – Russian project at Manifesta 4, Frankfurt am Main.
- 2002 – Russian Pavilion, 25th São Paulo Biennial, featuring Sergey Bratkov.
- 2005 – Angels of History: Moscow Conceptualism and Its Influence, MuHKA, Antwerp (co-curated with Bart De Baere and Anna Zaitseva).
- 2005 – 1st Moscow International Biennale of Contemporary Art, Dialectics of Hope — founding curator-coordinator, with Daniel Birnbaum, Iara Boubnova, Nicolas Bourriaud, Rosa Martínez, Hans Ulrich Obrist and Robert Storr.
- 2006 – Norman Foster: Space and Time, Pushkin State Museum of Fine Arts, Moscow.
- 2006 – The Origin of Species: Art in the Age of Social Darwinism, Museum of Contemporary Art, Toyama, and Museum of Contemporary Art, Hiroshima, Japan.
- 2007 – 2nd Moscow International Biennale of Contemporary Art, Footnotes on Geopolitics, Market and Amnesia — commissioner and co-curator, with Daniel Birnbaum, Iara Boubnova, Nicolas Bourriaud, Fulya Erdemci, Gunnar B. Kvaran, Rosa Martínez and Hans Ulrich Obrist.
- 2007–2008 – Yoko Ono: Odyssey of the Cockroach, TsUM, Moscow, staged as part of the 2nd Moscow Biennale (co-curated with Philip Dodd).
- 2008 – Russian Art: Paradoxes of History, National Academy of Art, Sofia, Bulgaria.
- 2008 – Ilya and Emilia Kabakov: An Alternative History of Art and Other Projects, Moscow (Garage Center for Contemporary Culture, Pushkin State Museum of Fine Arts and Winzavod Centre for Contemporary Art).
- 2009 – 3rd Moscow International Biennale of Contemporary Art, commissioner (curator: Jean-Hubert Martin).
- 2010 – Glasnost: Soviet Non-Conformist Art from the 1980s, Haunch of Venison, London.
- 2011 – 4th Moscow International Biennale of Contemporary Art, Rewriting Worlds — commissioner (curator: Peter Weibel).
- 2011 – The Practice of Everyday Life: Young Artists from Russia, Calvert 22, London (co-curated with David Thorp).
- 2013 – 5th Moscow International Biennale of Contemporary Art — commissioner (curator: Catherine de Zegher).
- 2014 – Irina Nakhova: Paradise, CCA Winzavod, Moscow.
- 2015 – 6th Moscow International Biennale of Contemporary Art, How to Gather? Acting in a Center in a City in the Heart of the Island of Eurasia — commissioner (curators: Bart De Baere, Defne Ayas and Nicolaus Schafhausen), VDNKh.
- 2019 – Komar and Melamid (advising curator; curator: Andrei Erofeev), Moscow Museum of Modern Art.

== Books ==
=== Books and essays ===
- J. Backstein; D. Birnbaum; S.-O. Wallenstein (Eds.). (2008). Thinking Worlds: The Moscow Conference on Philosophy, Politics, and Art. Les Presses du Réel.
- J. Bakshtein. (2015). Внутри картины. Статьи и диалоги о современном искусстве [Inside the Picture: Articles and Dialogues on Contemporary Art]. Novoye Literaturnoye Obozreniye.
- J. Bakshtein. (2018). Статьи и диалоги [Articles and Dialogues]. Ad Marginem Press / Garage.
- M. Epstein; J. Backstein; I. Kabakov. (2025). Триалоги [Trialogues]. NLO Books.

=== Exhibition catalogues ===
- D. A. Ross (Ed.). (1990). Between Spring and Summer: Soviet Conceptual Art in the Era of Late Communism. Tacoma Art Museum.
- J. Backstein. (1997). Secession: It's a Better World – Russischer Aktionismus und sein Kontext = Russian Actionism and Its Context. Secession.
- J. Backstein; B. De Baere; A. Zaitseva (Eds.). (2005). Angels of History: Moscow Conceptualism and Its Influence. Mercatorfonds.
- J. Backstein; A. Gormley. (2009). Поле притяжения [Domain Field]. Garage.
- J. Backstein; E. Degot. (2010). Glasnost: Soviet Non-Conformist Art from the 1980s. Haunch of Venison.

== See also ==
- Moscow Conceptualists
- Ilya Kabakov
- Moscow Biennale
- Garage Museum of Contemporary Art
