= Federation Tower =

Complex of two skyscrapers in Moscow, Russia

- Башня Федерация
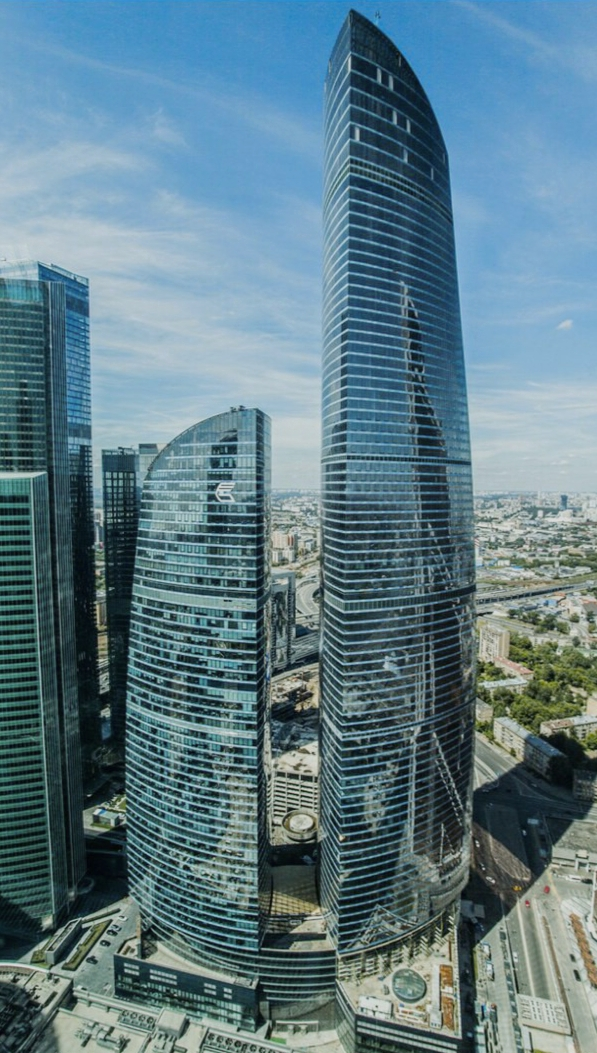

General information
- Status: Completed
- Type: Residential building; office building
- Architectural style: Postmodernism
- Location: 12, Krasnopresnenskaya Embankment, Moscow-City, Moscow, Russia
- Coordinates: 55°44′59.17″N 37°32′13.70″E
- Groundbreaking: 28 November 2003
- Construction started: 2005
- Completed: 7 December 2017
- Opened: Zapad: 2008; Vostok: 7 December 2017
- Cost: US$1.2 billion
- Owner: AEON Corporation (Russian)

Height
- Antenna spire: 450 m (1,480 ft) (dismantled)
- Top floor: 374 m (1,227 ft) (East Tower); 242 m (794 ft) (West Tower)

Technical details
- Floor count: 97 (East Tower); 63 (West Tower)
- Floor area: 439,154 m^{2} (4,727,010 sq ft)
- Lifts/elevators: 66

Design and construction
- Architects: Sergei Tchoban, Peter Schweger
- Developer: Mirax Group (now Potok Corporation)
- Structural engineer: Thornton Tomasetti
- Main contractor: Renaissance Construction Company

The Federation Tower (Russian: Башня Федерация, romanized: Bashnya Federatsiya) is a complex of two skyscrapers built on the 13th lot of the Moscow International Business Center in Moscow, Russia. The two skyscrapers are named Tower East or Vostok (Russian: Восток; literally means "East") and Tower West or Zapad (Russian: Запад; literally means "West").

The supertall skyscraper Tower East (Vostok) is currently the second-tallest skyscraper in Europe and Russia after the Lakhta Center, the tallest building in Moscow, and the 55th-tallest building in the world. Zapad is a shorter skyscraper than Vostok and is the eleventh-tallest building in Russia, and the 22nd-tallest building in Europe. The complex stands on the 13th lot, which has an area of 439,154 square meters.

The project was conceived by German-Russian engineer Sergei Tchoban and German professor and engineer Peter Schweger. The complex was designed by architecture companies nps+partner and Schweger Associated Architects. The complex started construction in 2005, with Zapad completed first in 2008 with a height of 242 meters (794 feet). As a result of the Great Recession, construction of the complex stopped until August 2011, and Vostok was completed on 7 December 2017 with a height of 374 meters (1,227 feet). In late 2014, Vostok surpassed the South Tower of OKO, which it is also part of the MIBC, as the tallest skyscraper of Russia and Europe. A spire was to be also built which would have extended the complex's height to 450 meters (1,480 feet) as well as provided an observation deck but it was never completed and was dismantled afterward.

The complex is owned by the AEON Corporation, a Russian private international investment group. The complex consists of two towers built on one podium. Tower East is a 97-story structure and Tower West is a 63-story structure. The complex is bounded by a rectangle of 3 alleys & a driveway. All three alleyways are named Krasnopresnenskaya Embankment, but the driveway on its east side is named 3rd Main Street. On 30 July 2023, across the alley from the back entrance, on the first floor, an aircraft (a Ukrainian drone) crashed into Rosbank (whose address is 1st Krasnogvardeisky Direction 19) & exploded, causing a small amount of damage to its facade.

== Tower East ==
=== Planning and early development ===
The higher tower of the complex located in the eastern part of lot number 13 was formerly known as Tower "A". But in November 2006, to avoid name competition with Naberezhnaya Tower, it was renamed Tower "Vostok (East)". Tower East is designed to have 95 above-ground and 3 underground floors, and 17 high-speed elevators will be installed there (JP. Kocher). According to the company Potok, which is the builder of the tower, it used grade B90 concrete which is twice as strong as regular concrete and will allow the skyscraper to withstand a direct hit of an aircraft. In early December 2009, the Potok Corporation management (ex-Mirax Group) announced that in the case of financial problems it could reduce the number of floors of Tower East from 95 to 64 floors. However, in March 2010, the company's management stated that Tower East would be completed according to the original project design.

The construction of this tower is the second stage of the entire complex construction, and during the construction of the first tower, "Zapad (West)", its design underwent some significant changes and became radically different from the original version. In the first place, the square footage of the floors changed, and visually the tower became thicker at the base to the extent that a part of the floors, starting with the 11th, protrude a little beyond the 13th lot borderline. The tower core was significantly revised, too, and now has a trapezoidal shape rather than hexagonal as in the earlier design. The load-bearing columns became twice as thick; therefore, the amount of concrete required for the construction of the columns increased 4 times, and, consequently, significantly increased the total mass of the building.

=== Construction ===
Construction started in 2005. During the construction of the foundation slab on 21–24 February 2007, a new record listed in the Guinness Book of Records was set: 14,000 cubic meters of concrete were placed then. Somewhat unusual in the construction process was that the first base plate was covered with the second base plate, which resulted in the complex losing one underground level and the construction delayed by at least five months. The extravagance of this decision lies in the fact that, judging by the photographs obtained from the site, the builders began active preparations for the construction of the first underground floor, but suddenly stopped working, dismantled the installed cranes, cut the reinforcement bars previously prepared for the columns and began to place reinforcement for the second base plate. That the construction organizers did not clearly comment on the reasons for this decision was also unusual. The tower was climbed solo by the Frenchman Alain Robert in September 2007.

In the process of further construction the pace of the tower erection changed over a fairly wide range: the underground and podium parts of the building were being built at an average rate of about two levels a month; after the podium was completed, the construction of standard floors went at a faster rate of four floors per month, while at the technical 33–34 levels of the building the construction of that floor was significantly suspended and lasted more than five months; one of the cranes was replaced with two more powerful ones, and a strong metal outrigger structure was formed, contributing to the greater rigidity of the building and its resistance to wind loads.

As of mid-May 2008, the tower was built to a height of about 170 meters (560 feet). In November 2008, due to the Great Recession and a lack of funding, construction of the skyscraper was suspended.

The building is actively used as a sightseeing object and a high-rise structure for extreme sports lovers (base jumpers, climbers, etc.), as well as a site for shooting films and videos (TV shows, advertising, and movie production). In 2012, the Moscow 24 TV channel shot a movie about the business complex. Another film dedicated to the skyscraper was made by the Discovery Channel TV channel in 2009.

On 5 July 2011, the construction company Potok announced the tower construction to be resumed. The actual growth of the tower was scheduled to begin in September 2011. As of 30 March 2012, the 67th story of Tower East had been completed; the glazing of the tower was being conducted as well.

On 2 April 2012, firefighters and firefighting helicopters struggled to put out a massive blaze that broke out on the 67th floor of the under-construction Federation Tower East. "The fire was visible from much of the Russian capital's western half. Two firefighting helicopters noisily circled the blaze, dumping huge buckets of water on the flames before the Emergencies Ministry said the fire had been stopped from spreading by about 11:30 p.m. (1930 GMT), some three hours after it broke out." "The area affected by the fire has exceeded 300 square meters (3,200 square feet)", Major-General Sergei Anikeyev, deputy head of the city's emergency department, told the news agency Itar-Tass. "The 14 people who were at the top floors when the fire started have been evacuated. No one was hurt," he told Itar-Tass.

On 18 December 2014, Vostok was topped out when the skyscraper reached its planned height of 374 meters (1,227 feet). The construction teams, including Turner, celebrated the pouring of the last structural concrete cube, 374 meters above the ground. The topping-out generated excitement in the Russian press, as the tower received the title of being the tallest building in Russia and Europe, surpassing OKO's South Tower.

On 20 January 2017, Europe's tallest elevator shaft was constructed in Vostok, with the launch of the tallest elevator in Europe taking place simultaneously with the opening of the southern entrance lobby of the tower. According to Russian Construction, the elevator's cabin moves without switches from the second underground level to the 94th story. Schindler freight-passenger elevator will go up at the height of 355 meters above the ground level. Its total path of motion with the consideration of underground floors will amount to 365 meters. The elevator's carrying capacity is 2 tons. During an interview with the director general of the "Federation Tower" Ltd., Mikhail Smirnov by Iterfax-Realty, construction of the skyscraper would finish by the end of March 2017. Earlier, the Moscow State Construction Supervision Committee reported that the tower would be put in operation by July 2017, Interfax reports.

On 6 October 2017, the Lakhta Center of St. Petersburg surpassed Vostok's height of 1,227 ft (374 m), making it the tallest building in Russia and Europe.

On 7 December 2017, construction of Vostok was completed, making it the tallest completed skyscraper in Russia and Europe currently.

=== Purpose ===
Vostok would be used for multiple purposes, high rise development designed to house offices, retail areas, a five star hotel, and luxury apartments upon completion. A number of luxurious offices will occupy the penthouse's area of 12,000 square meters from the 90th to 98th stories. The upper levels of the 95-story tower will include the hotel lobby, restaurants, and a public viewing platform. The lower levels will contain retail shops and restaurants as well as the hotel's ballroom, and conference and events center. The building would also feature the highest digital clock in the world.

== Tower West ==
=== Planning and early development ===
The lower tower of the complex is located on the western part of lot 13 in the MIBC. The tower was formerly known as Tower "B" but in order to avoid name competition with Naberezhnaya Tower, it was renamed Tower "Zapad (West)". In November 2006, after the name competition, it was renamed Tower West. Tower West is planned to have 62 stories above ground and four underground floors, with 11 twin and six high-speed elevators.

=== Construction ===
The erection of Tower West was the first stage of the entire Federation complex construction, but the height of the tower was increased in comparison with the original models (originally, Tower West was planned to be half the height of Tower East). The cross-section of the tower's core, originally planned to be hexagonal, was modified after construction began and is now trapezoidal. The core was constructed so it rose above the rest of the structure, which was assembled one or two floors behind. The building was completed in early 2008.

=== Purpose ===
Tower West would include a hotel spa and swimming pool. The 61st floor of the Tower West accommodates the tallest restaurant in Moscow, 'Sixty', run by Ginza Project.

=== Awards ===
- 2009 – The western tower of the Federation business complex was the winner of the World FIABCI competition Prix d'Excellence in the category "Office Property".
- 2011 – The Federation Tower was awarded with the "Records of real estate market" prize in the "Business Center No 1" nomination.

== Notable residents ==
- Syrian dictator Bashar Al Assad and his family are said to have a 2 story penthouse in the complex.

== Construction gallery ==
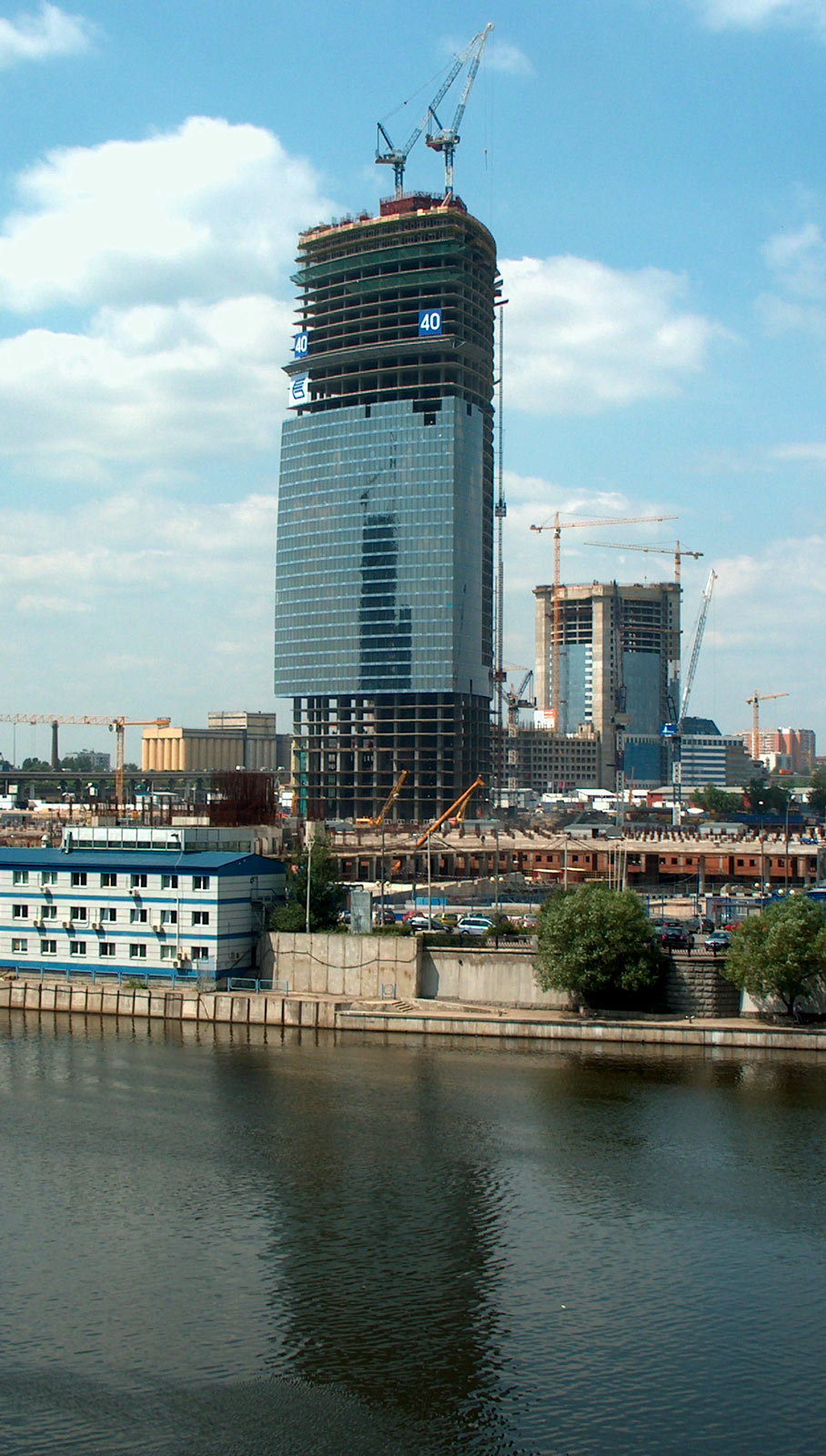
Tower B
June 28, 2006

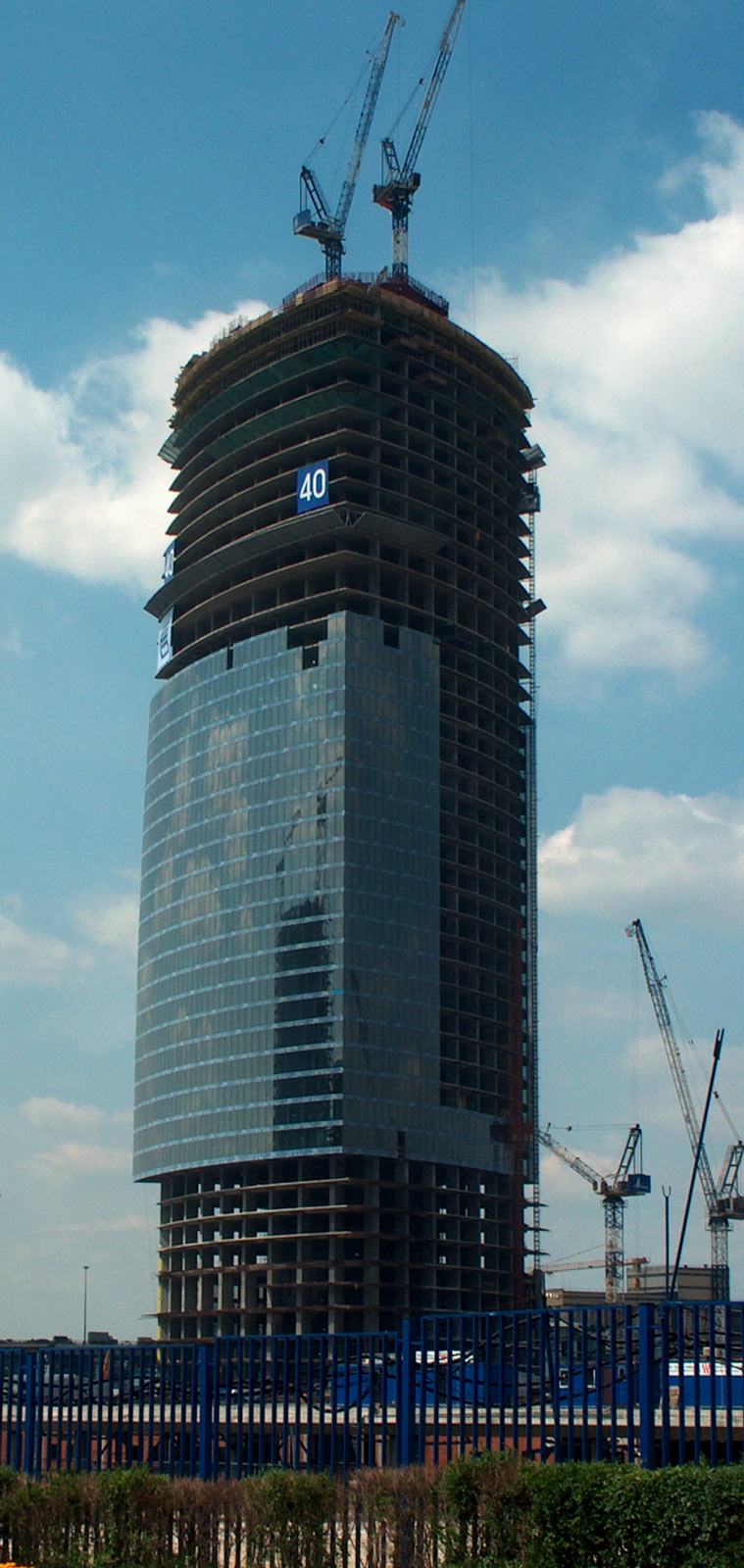
June 28, 2006

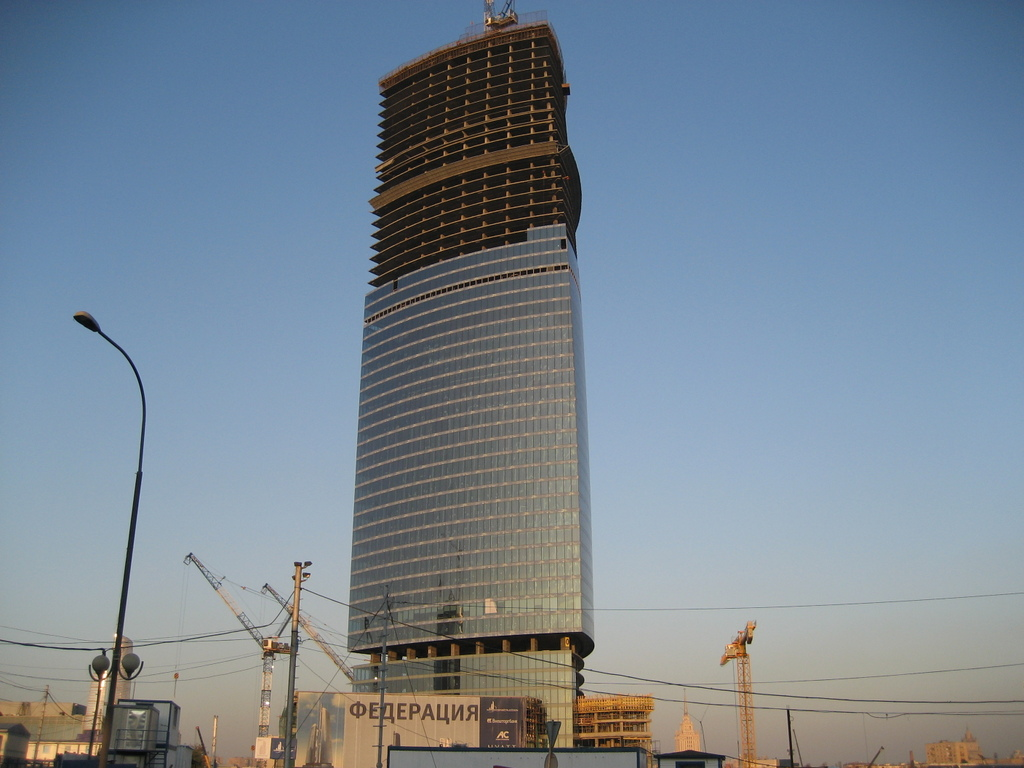
September 24, 2006

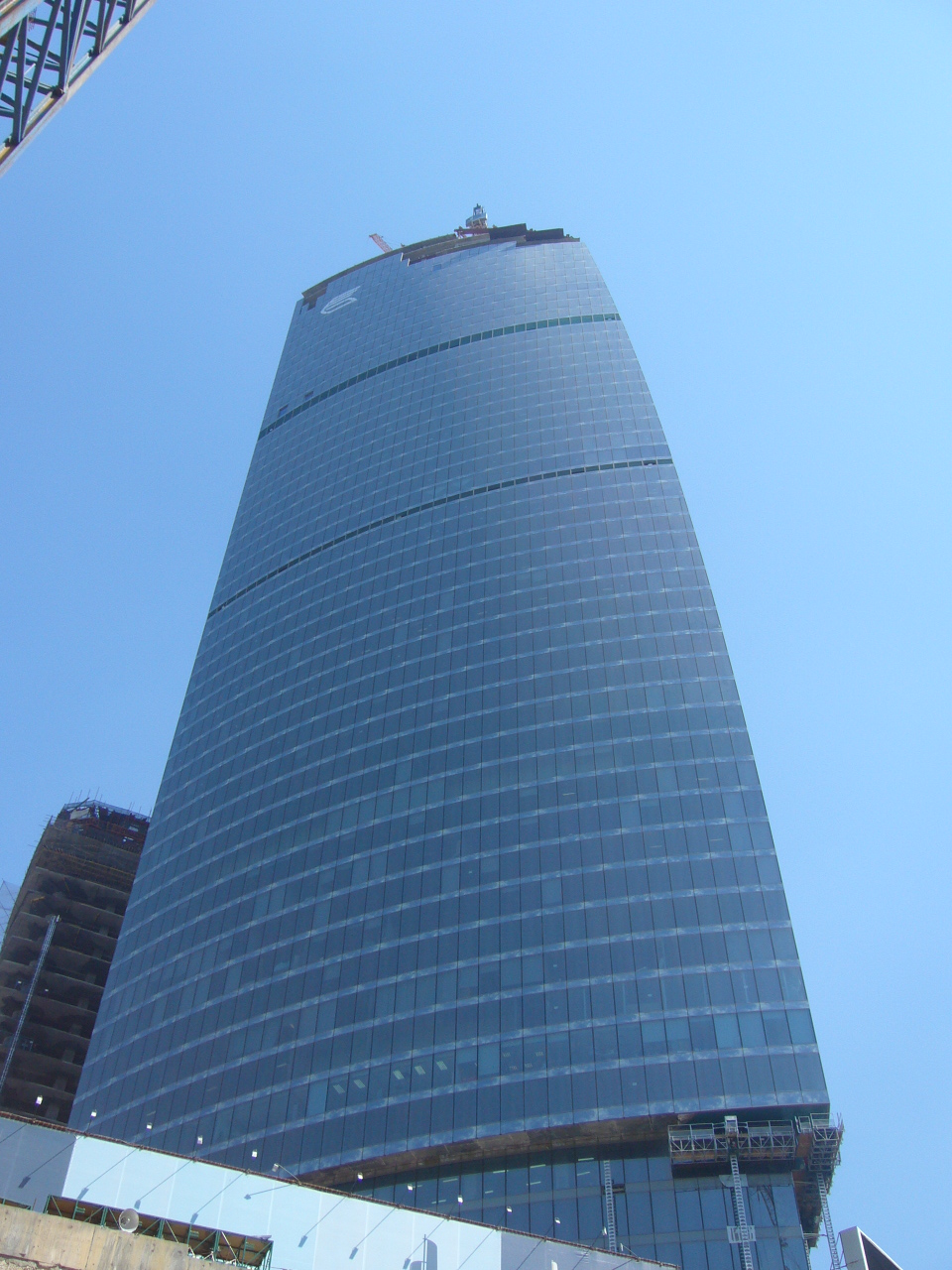
August 14, 2007

September 11, 2007

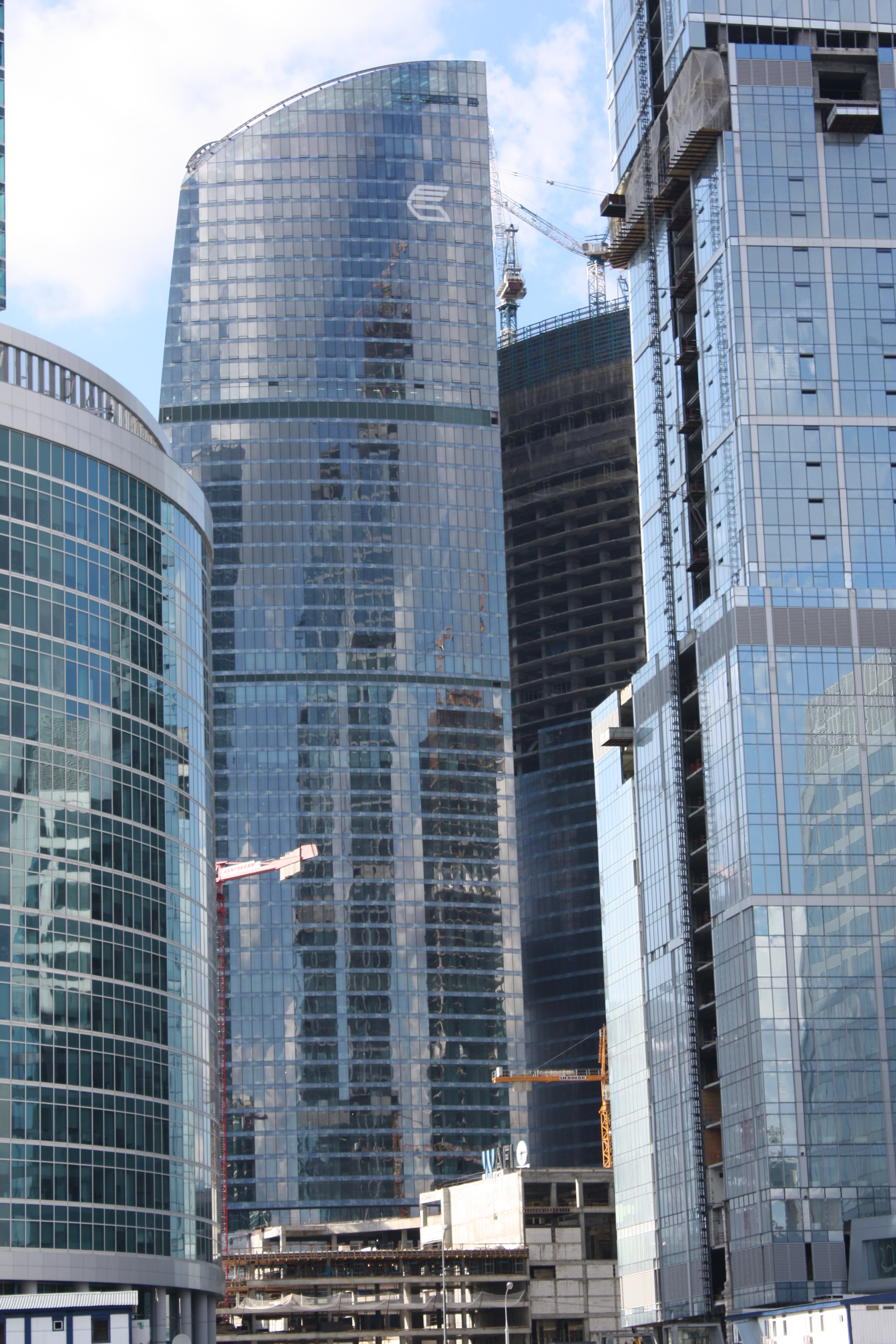
July 21, 2008

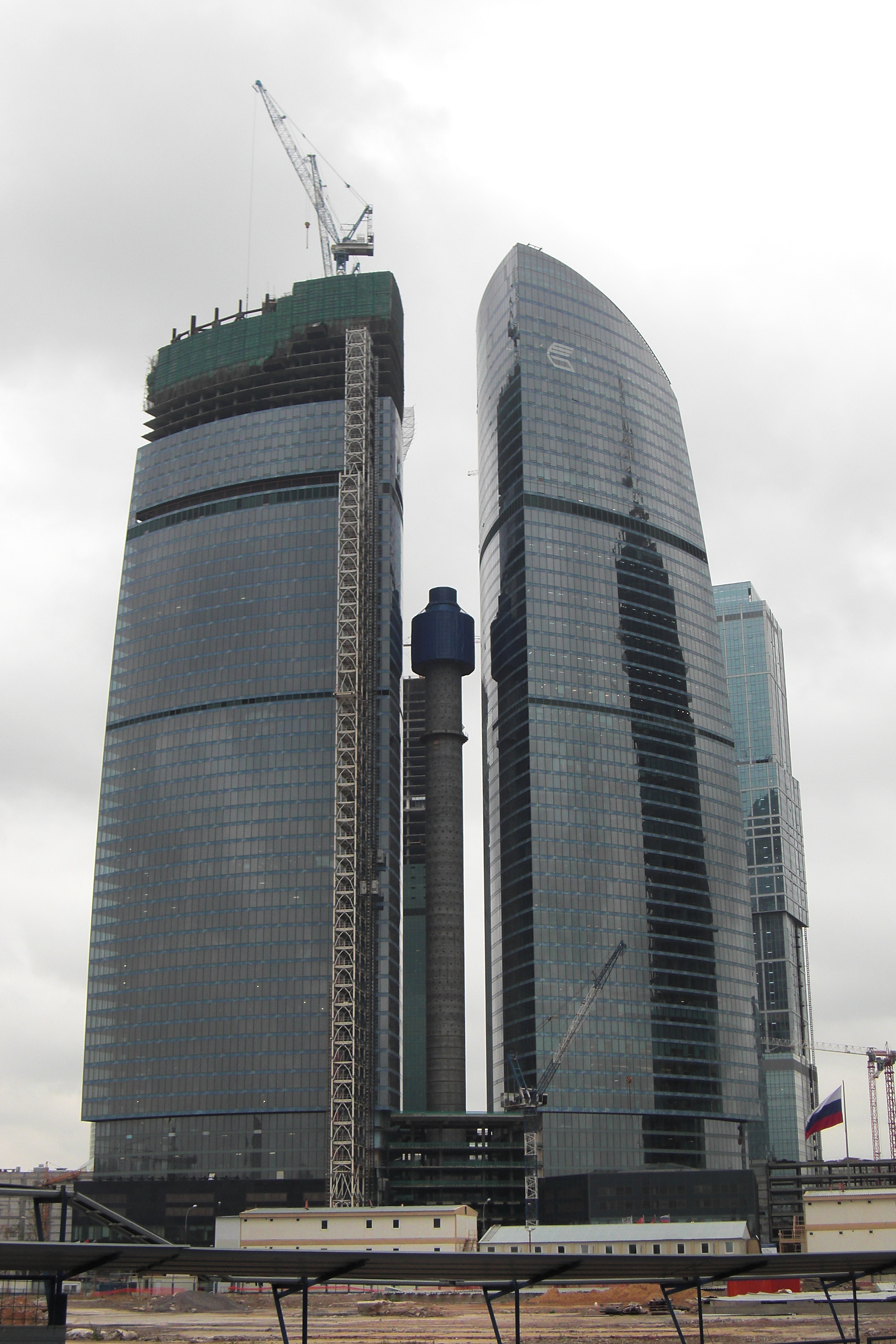
September 28, 2009

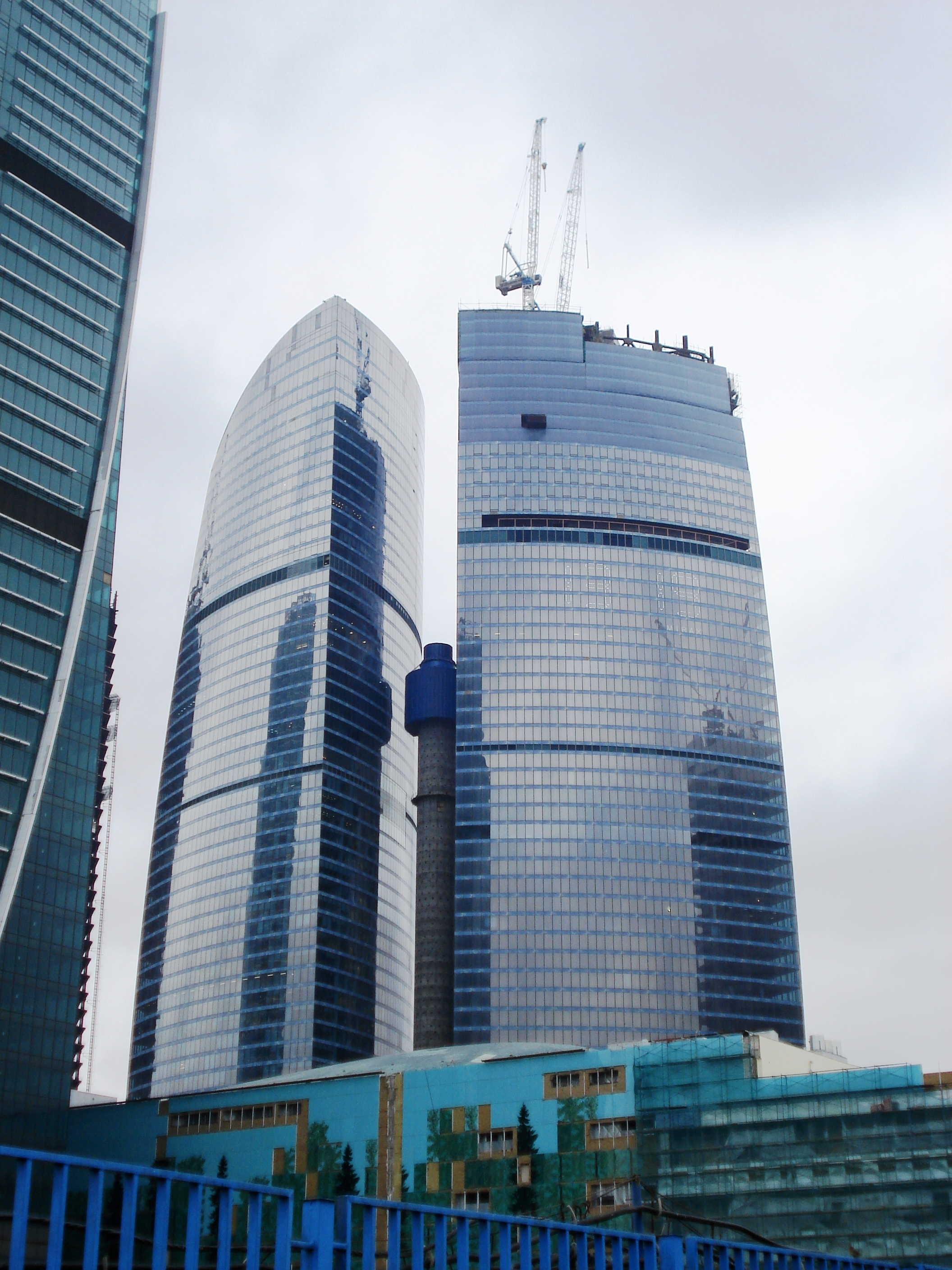
November, 2010

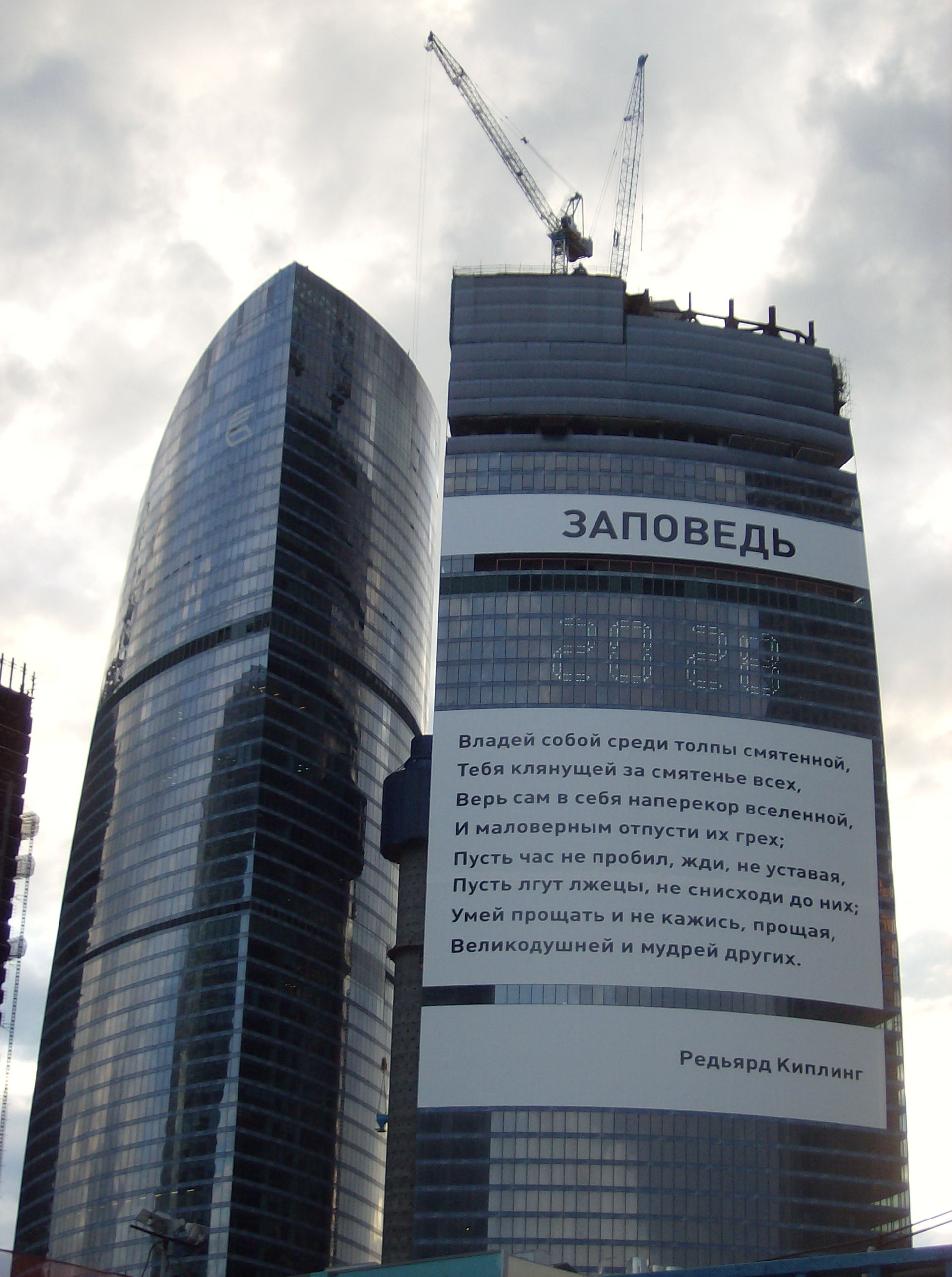
August 1, 2011

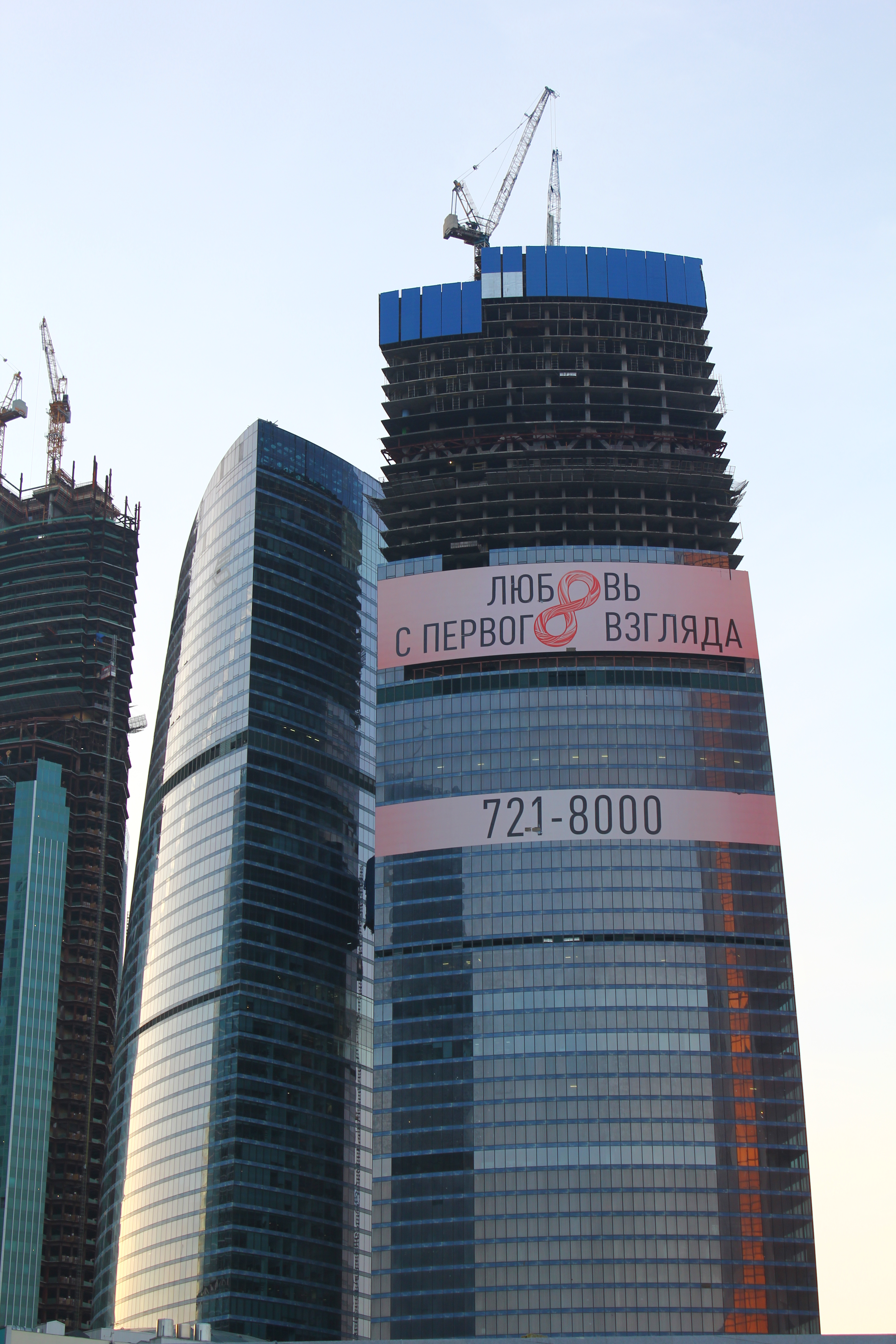
October 20, 2012

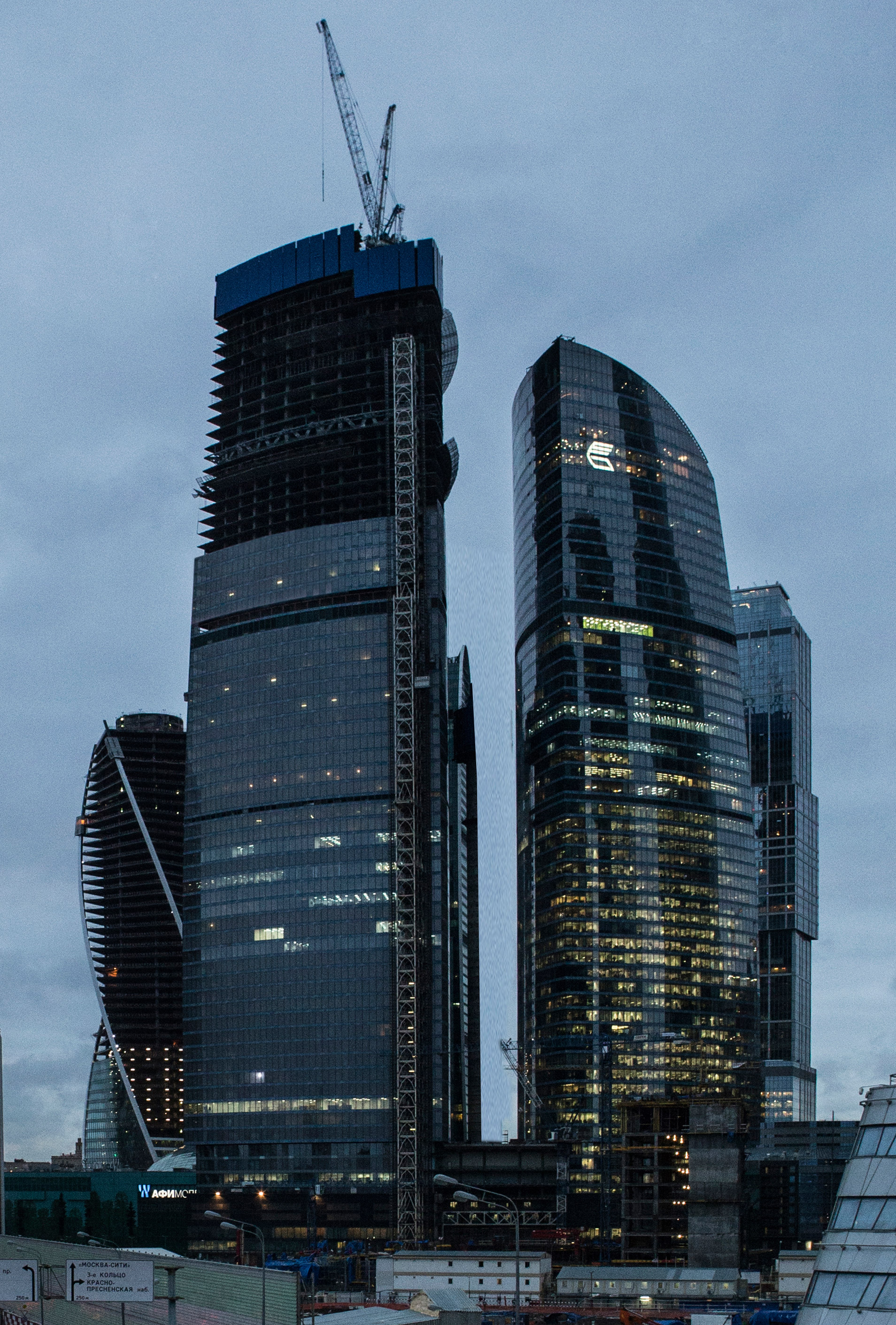
January 20, 2014

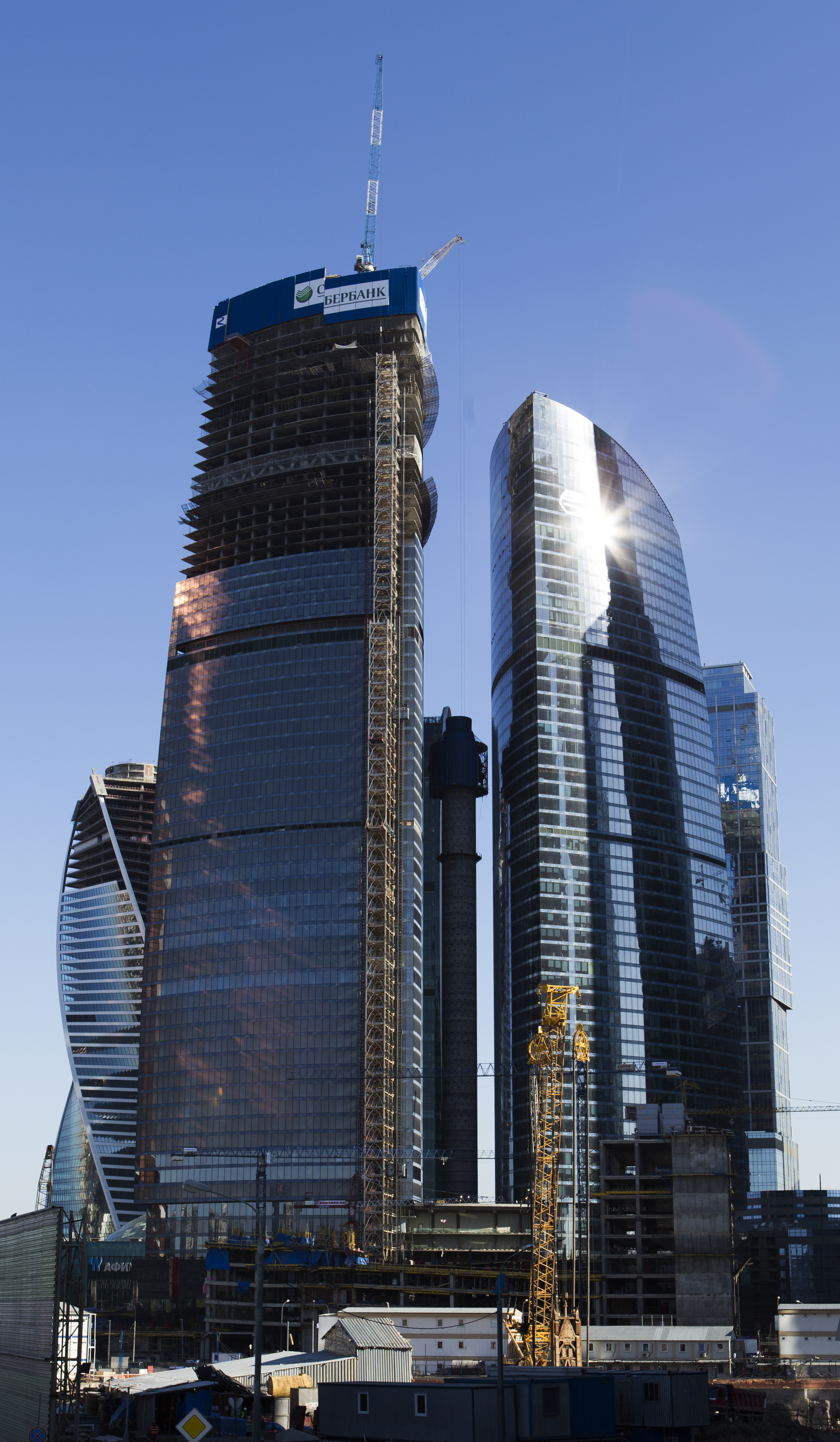
April, 2014

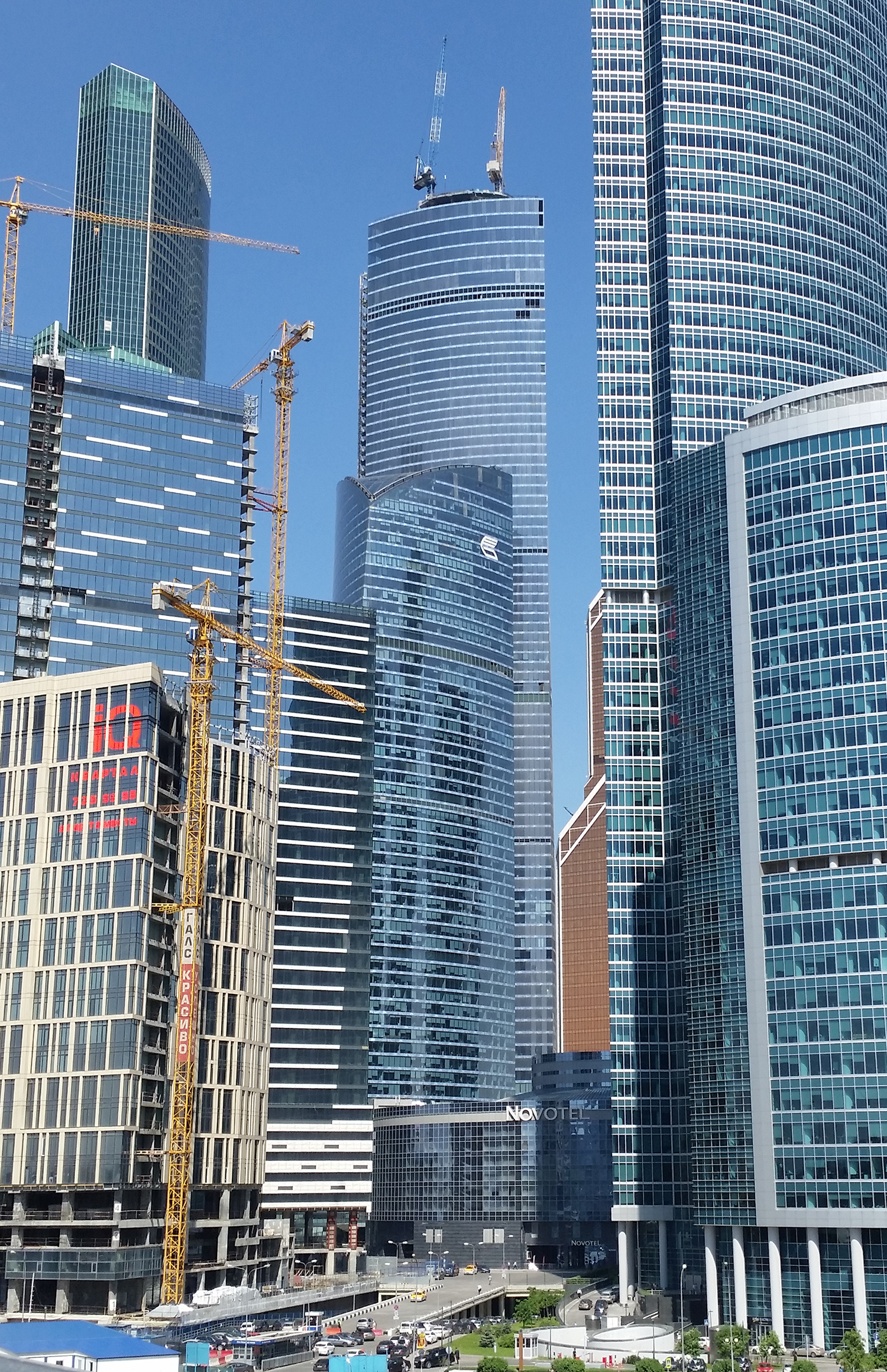
May, 2015

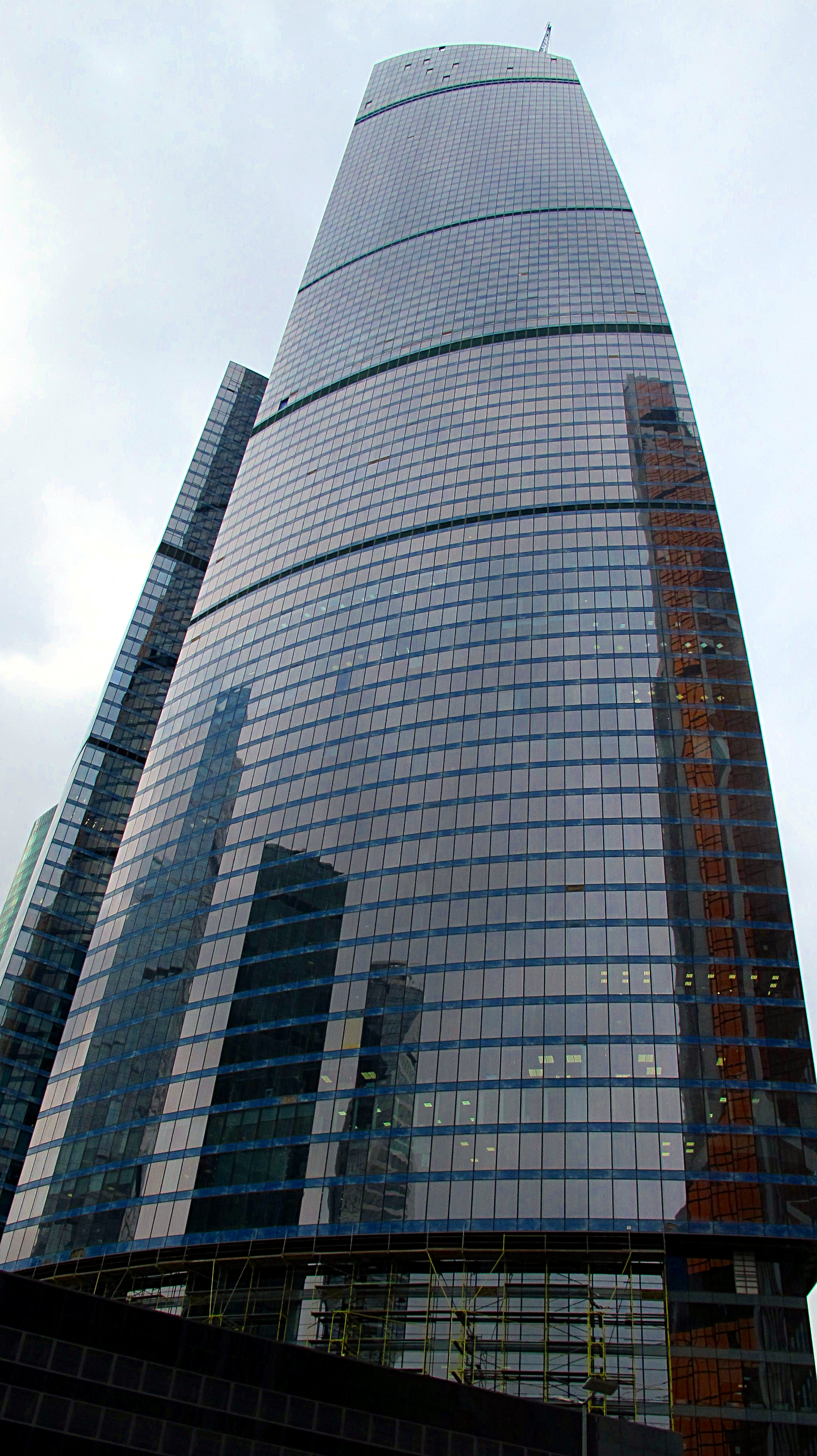
March 22, 2016

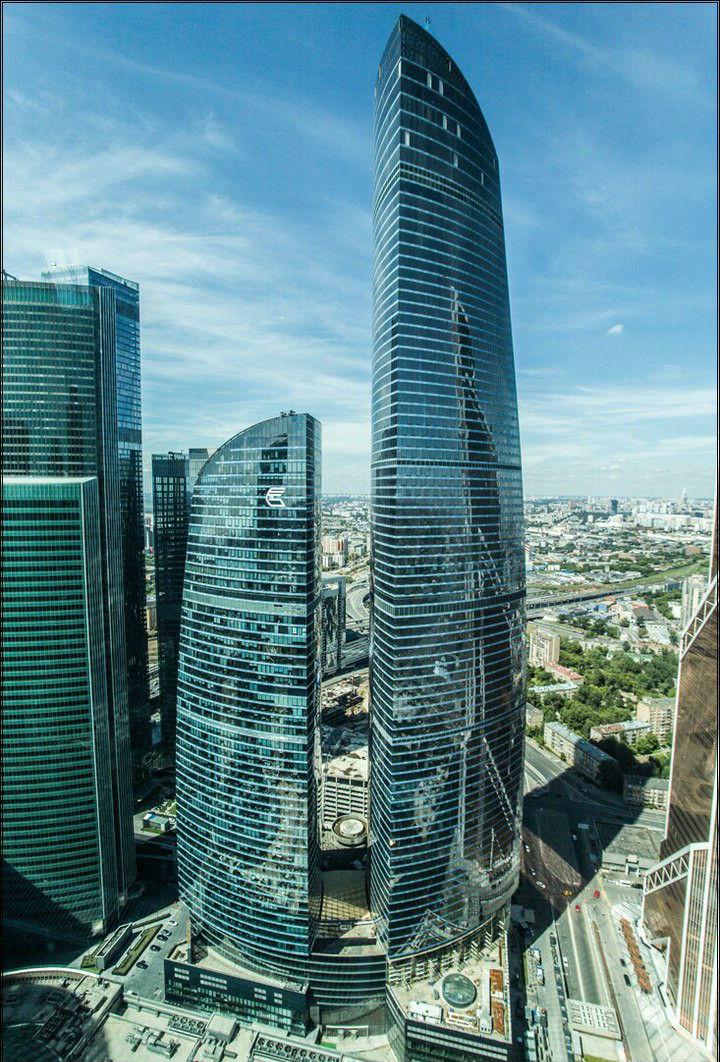
July, 2016

== See also ==
- List of tallest buildings in Russia
- List of tallest buildings in Europe

Records
Preceded by OKO (South Tower)	Europe’s tallest building 2014 – 2017	Succeeded by Lakhta Center
Preceded by OKO (South Tower)	Russia’s tallest building 2014 – 2017	Succeeded by Lakhta Center
Preceded by OKO (South Tower)	Tallest building in Moscow; 2014 – present	Succeeded by Incumbent
Notes and references
1. Records for Tower East of the Federation Tower
