= Olga Chernysheva =

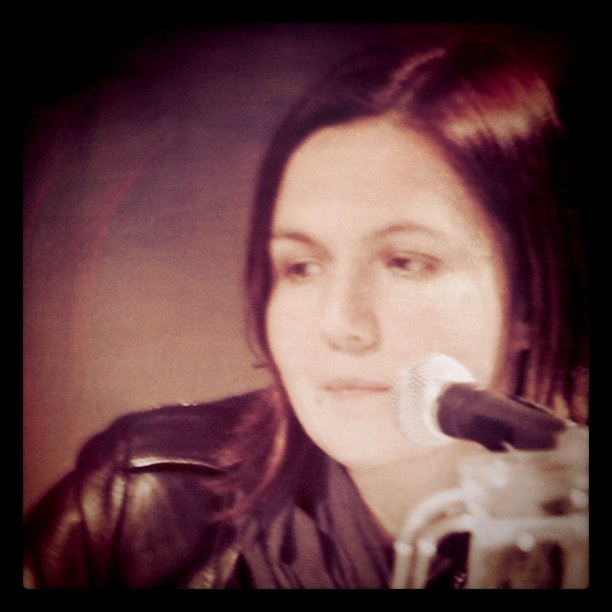
Olga Chernysheva, February 2011

Olga Chernysheva (born 1962 in Moscow, Russia) is a contemporary artist who lives and works in Moscow. Her work spans film, photography, drawing and object-based mediums, where she draws on quotidian moments and marginal spaces from everyday life as a way of exploring the increasing fragmentation of master narratives in contemporary Russian culture.

She holds a BA from the Gerasimov Institute of Cinematography, Moscow and she finished a residency at the Rijksakademie Van Beeldende Kunsten, Amsterdam. Her work has been exhibited in galleries and museums internationally, including Museum of Modern Art, New York; Lunds Konsthall, Sweden; Moscow Biennale for Contemporary Art; Biennale of Museum Folkwang, Essen; Kunsthalle Hamburg; Solomon R Guggenheim Museum, New York.

Her work is held in major collections worldwide, including Museum of Modern Art, New York; Louis Vuitton Foundation, Paris; Russian Museum, St. Petersburg; Russian Ministry of Culture, Moscow; Moscow Museum of Modern Art; Nasher Museum of Art, Duke University; Ludwig Forum fur Internationale Kunst, Aachen, Germany; The National Museum of Art, Architecture and Design, Oslo; NBK, Berlin, Germany; Victoria & Albert Museum, London.

== Selected bibliography ==
- Abensour, Dominique. "Olga Chernysheva", De Moscou, 2002: 12-21.
- Amir, Yaelle. "Olga Chernysheva", ArtUS 19, Summer 2007: 23.
- Andreeva, Ekaterina. "Our Time According to Olga Chernysheva", The Happiness Zone, 2004: 17-23.
- Degot, Ekaterina. "Inhabitants: A Conversation with Olga Chernysheva", *World Art Museum, No. 26, 20 January 2007: 92-93, 116-119.
- Groys, Boris. "The Time Closure", The Happiness Zone, 2004: 7-15.
- Groys, Boris. "Documenting everyday art", Olga Chernysheva: Works 2000-2008, Galerie Volker Diehl, Berlin and *Diehl + Gallery One, Moscow, 2009.
- Rudick, Nicole. “Olga Chernysheva”, Artforum.com, Picks, 3 April 2007.
- Szymczyk, Adam, Chernysheva, Olga. "Sheer Presence", Camera Austria International 142 | 2018: 9-20.
