= Mikhalevo =

Mikhalevo (Russian: Михалево) or Mikhalyovo (Михалёво) is the name of several rural localities in Russia.

== Modern localities ==
=== Arkhangelsk Oblast ===
As of 2012, four rural localities in Arkhangelsk Oblast bear this name:

- Mikhalevo, Kargopolsky District, Arkhangelsk Oblast, a village in Khotenovsky Selsoviet of Kargopolsky District
- Mikhalevo, Kotlassky District, Arkhangelsk Oblast, a village in Solvychegodsky Selsoviet of Kotlassky District
- Mikhalevo, Plesetsky District, Arkhangelsk Oblast, a village in Fedovsky Selsoviet of Plesetsky District
- Mikhalevo, Ustyansky District, Arkhangelsk Oblast, a village in Likhachevsky Selsoviet of Ustyansky District

=== Ivanovo Oblast ===
As of 2012, five rural localities in Ivanovo Oblast bear this name:

- Mikhalevo, Ivanovsky District, Ivanovo Oblast, a selo in Ivanovsky District
- Mikhalevo, Privolzhsky District, Ivanovo Oblast, a village in Privolzhsky District
- Mikhalevo, Savinsky District, Ivanovo Oblast, a selo in Savinsky District
- Mikhalevo (Semeykinskoye Rural Settlement), Shuysky District, Ivanovo Oblast, a village in Shuysky District; municipally, a part of Semeykinskoye Rural Settlement of that district
- Mikhalevo (Vasilyevskoye Rural Settlement), Shuysky District, Ivanovo Oblast, a village in Shuysky District; municipally, a part of Vasilyevskoye Rural Settlement of that district

=== Kaluga Oblast ===
As of 2012, two rural localities in Kaluga Oblast bear this name:

- Mikhalevo, Kirovsky District, Kaluga Oblast, a village in Kirovsky District
- Mikhalevo, Maloyaroslavetsky District, Kaluga Oblast, a village in Maloyaroslavetsky District

=== Kostroma Oblast ===
As of 2012, five rural localities in Kostroma Oblast bear this name:

- Mikhalevo, Orekhovskoye Settlement, Galichsky District, Kostroma Oblast, a village in Orekhovskoye Settlement of Galichsky District
- Mikhalevo, Orekhovskoye Settlement, Galichsky District, Kostroma Oblast, a village in Orekhovskoye Settlement of Galichsky District
- Mikhalevo, Mezhevskoy District, Kostroma Oblast, a village in Georgiyevskoye Settlement of Mezhevskoy District; 58°41′N 44°50′E
- Mikhalevo, Neysky District, Kostroma Oblast, a village in Vozherovskoye Settlement of Neysky District; 58°40′N 43°56′E
- Mikhalevo, Nikolo-Polomskoye Settlement, Parfenyevsky District, Kostroma Oblast, a village in Nikolo-Polomskoye Settlement of Parfenyevsky District; 58°27′N 43°12′E

=== Kurgan Oblast ===
As of 2012, one rural locality in Kurgan Oblast bears this name:

- Mikhalevo, Kurgan Oblast, a selo in Lugovskoy Selsoviet of Tselinny District; 54°18′N 63°35′E

=== Leningrad Oblast ===
As of 2012, three rural localities in Leningrad Oblast bear this name:

- Mikhalevo, Boksitogorsky District, Leningrad Oblast, a village under the administrative jurisdiction of Yefimovskoye Settlement Municipal Formation in Boksitogorsky District; 59°34′N 34°29′E
- Mikhalyovo, Tikhvinsky District, Leningrad Oblast (or Mikhalevo), a village in Gankovskoye Settlement Municipal Formation of Tikhvinsky District; 59°53′N 33°47′E
- Mikhalevo, Vyborgsky District, Leningrad Oblast, a settlement under the administrative jurisdiction of Kamennogorskoye Settlement Municipal Formation in Vyborgsky District; 60°59′N 29°26′E

=== Moscow Oblast ===
As of 2012, nine rural localities in Moscow Oblast bear this name:

- Mikhalevo, Dmitrovsky District, Moscow Oblast, a village in Bolsherogachevskoye Rural Settlement of Dmitrovsky District
- Mikhalevo, Lotoshinsky District, Moscow Oblast, a village under the administrative jurisdiction of Lotoshino Work Settlement in Lotoshinsky District
- Mikhalevo, Mozhaysky District, Moscow Oblast, a village in Drovninskoye Rural Settlement of Mozhaysky District
- Mikhalevo, Pavlovo-Posadsky District, Moscow Oblast, a village in Kuznetsovskoye Rural Settlement of Pavlovo-Posadsky District
- Mikhalevo, Pushkinsky District, Moscow Oblast, a village in Yeldiginskoye Rural Settlement of Pushkinsky District
- Mikhalevo, Sergiyevo-Posadsky District, Moscow Oblast, a village in Shemetovskoye Rural Settlement of Sergiyevo-Posadsky District
- Mikhalevo, Shakhovskoy District, Moscow Oblast, a village in Seredinskoye Rural Settlement of Shakhovskoy District
- Mikhalevo, Voskresensky District, Moscow Oblast, a selo under the administrative jurisdiction of Beloozersky Work Settlement in Voskresensky District
- Mikhalevo, Zaraysky District, Moscow Oblast, a village in Strupnenskoye Rural Settlement of Zaraysky District

=== Nizhny Novgorod Oblast ===
As of 2012, two rural localities in Nizhny Novgorod Oblast bear this name:

- Mikhalevo, Chkalovsky District, Nizhny Novgorod Oblast, a village in Kotelnitsky Selsoviet of Chkalovsky District
- Mikhalevo, Vachsky District, Nizhny Novgorod Oblast, a village in Kazakovsky Selsoviet of Vachsky District

=== Novgorod Oblast ===
As of 2012, three rural localities in Novgorod Oblast bear this name:

- Mikhalevo, Borovichsky District, Novgorod Oblast, a village in Yegolskoye Settlement of Borovichsky District
- Mikhalevo, Demyansky District, Novgorod Oblast, a village in Zhirkovskoye Settlement of Demyansky District
- Mikhalevo, Lyubytinsky District, Novgorod Oblast, a village under the administrative jurisdiction of the Settlement of Lyubytinskoye in Lyubytinsky District

=== Oryol Oblast ===
As of 2012, one rural locality in Oryol Oblast bears this name:

- Mikhalevo, Oryol Oblast, a village in Petushensky Selsoviet of Novosilsky District

=== Pskov Oblast ===
As of 2012, five rural localities in Pskov Oblast bear this name:

- Mikhalevo, Dedovichsky District, Pskov Oblast, a village in Dedovichsky District
- Mikhalevo, Ostrovsky District, Pskov Oblast, a village in Ostrovsky District
- Mikhalevo, Palkinsky District, Pskov Oblast, a village in Palkinsky District
- Mikhalevo, Pechorsky District, Pskov Oblast, a village in Pechorsky District
- Mikhalevo, Pskovsky District, Pskov Oblast, a village in Pskovsky District

=== Smolensk Oblast ===
As of 2012, one rural locality in Smolensk Oblast bears this name:

- Mikhalevo, Smolensk Oblast, a village in Zhichitskoye Rural Settlement of Demidovsky District

=== Tver Oblast ===
As of 2012, eleven rural localities in Tver Oblast bear this name:

- Mikhalevo, Belsky District, Tver Oblast, a village in Demyakhovskoye Rural Settlement of Belsky District
- Mikhalevo, Bezhetsky District, Tver Oblast, a village in Sukromenskoye Rural Settlement of Bezhetsky District
- Mikhalevo, Kimrsky District, Tver Oblast, a village in Goritskoye Rural Settlement of Kimrsky District
- Mikhalevo, Krasnokholmsky District, Tver Oblast, a village in Likhachevskoye Rural Settlement of Krasnokholmsky District
- Mikhalevo, Nelidovsky District, Tver Oblast, a village in Zemtsovskoye Rural Settlement of Nelidovsky District
- Mikhalevo, Rzhevsky District, Tver Oblast, a village in Itomlya Rural Settlement of Rzhevsky District
- Mikhalevo, Selizharovsky District, Tver Oblast, a village in Dmitrovskoye Rural Settlement of Selizharovsky District
- Mikhalevo, Udomelsky District, Tver Oblast, a village in Moldinskoye Rural Settlement of Udomelsky District
- Mikhalevo, Vesyegonsky District, Tver Oblast, a village in Ivanovskoye Rural Settlement of Vesyegonsky District
- Mikhalevo, Zapadnodvinsky District, Tver Oblast, a village in Sharapovskoye Rural Settlement of Zapadnodvinsky District
- Mikhalevo, Zharkovsky District, Tver Oblast, a village in Novoselkovskoye Rural Settlement of Zharkovsky District

=== Vladimir Oblast ===
As of 2012, three rural localities in Vladimir Oblast bear this name:

- Mikhalevo, Muromsky District, Vladimir Oblast, a village in Muromsky District
- Mikhalevo (Lavrovskoye Rural Settlement), Sudogodsky District, Vladimir Oblast, a village in Sudogodsky District; municipally, a part of Lavrovskoye Rural Settlement of that district
- Mikhalevo (Golovinskoye Rural Settlement), Sudogodsky District, Vladimir Oblast, a village in Sudogodsky District; municipally, a part of Golovinskoye Rural Settlement of that district

=== Vologda Oblast ===
As of 2012, seventeen rural localities in Vologda Oblast bear this name:

- Mikhalevo, Belozersky District, Vologda Oblast, a village in Paninsky Selsoviet of Belozersky District
- Mikhalevo, Ilyinsky Selsoviet, Cherepovetsky District, Vologda Oblast, a village in Ilyinsky Selsoviet of Cherepovetsky District
- Mikhalevo, Myaksinsky Selsoviet, Cherepovetsky District, Vologda Oblast, a village in Myaksinsky Selsoviet of Cherepovetsky District
- Mikhalevo, Gryazovetsky District, Vologda Oblast, a village in Pertsevsky Selsoviet of Gryazovetsky District
- Mikhalevo, Kaduysky District, Vologda Oblast, a village in Velikoselsky Selsoviet of Kaduysky District
- Mikhalevo, Kharovsky District, Vologda Oblast, a village in Kubinsky Selsoviet of Kharovsky District
- Mikhalevo, Kirillovsky District, Vologda Oblast, a village in Nikolo-Torzhsky Selsoviet of Kirillovsky District
- Mikhalevo, Mezhdurechensky District, Vologda Oblast, a village in Vragovsky Selsoviet of Mezhdurechensky District
- Mikhalevo, Nesterovsky Selsoviet, Sokolsky District, Vologda Oblast, a village in Nesterovsky Selsoviet of Sokolsky District
- Mikhalevo, Pelshemsky Selsoviet, Sokolsky District, Vologda Oblast, a village in Pelshemsky Selsoviet of Sokolsky District
- Mikhalevo, Vorobyevsky Selsoviet, Sokolsky District, Vologda Oblast, a village in Vorobyevsky Selsoviet of Sokolsky District
- Mikhalevo, Ustyuzhensky District, Vologda Oblast, a village in Mezzhensky Selsoviet of Ustyuzhensky District
- Mikhalevo, Chushevitsky Selsoviet, Verkhovazhsky District, Vologda Oblast, a village in Chushevitsky Selsoviet of Verkhovazhsky District
- Mikhalevo, Shelotsky Selsoviet, Verkhovazhsky District, Vologda Oblast, a village in Shelotsky Selsoviet of Verkhovazhsky District
- Mikhalevo, Bereznikovsky Selsoviet, Vologodsky District, Vologda Oblast, a village in Bereznikovsky Selsoviet of Vologodsky District
- Mikhalevo, Podlesny Selsoviet, Vologodsky District, Vologda Oblast, a village in Podlesny Selsoviet of Vologodsky District
- Mikhalevo, Vytegorsky District, Vologda Oblast, a village in Andomsky Selsoviet of Vytegorsky District

=== Yaroslavl Oblast ===
As of 2012, sixteen rural localities in Yaroslavl Oblast bear this name:

- Mikhalevo, Breytovsky District, Yaroslavl Oblast, a village in Ulyanovsky Rural Okrug of Breytovsky District
- Mikhalevo, Dmitriyevsky Rural Okrug, Danilovsky District, Yaroslavl Oblast, a village in Dmitriyevsky Rural Okrug of Danilovsky District
- Mikhalevo, Fedurinsky Rural Okrug, Danilovsky District, Yaroslavl Oblast, a village in Fedurinsky Rural Okrug of Danilovsky District
- Mikhalevo, Vakhtinsky Rural Okrug, Danilovsky District, Yaroslavl Oblast, a village in Vakhtinsky Rural Okrug of Danilovsky District
- Mikhalevo, Gavrilov-Yamsky District, Yaroslavl Oblast, a village in Zayachye-Kholmsky Rural Okrug of Gavrilov-Yamsky District
- Mikhalevo, Lyubimsky District, Yaroslavl Oblast, a village in Voskresensky Rural Okrug of Lyubimsky District
- Mikhalevo, Borovskoy Rural Okrug, Nekrasovsky District, Yaroslavl Oblast, a village in Borovskoy Rural Okrug of Nekrasovsky District
- Mikhalevo, Klimovsky Rural Okrug, Nekrasovsky District, Yaroslavl Oblast, a village in Klimovsky Rural Okrug of Nekrasovsky District
- Mikhalevo, Pereslavsky District, Yaroslavl Oblast, a selo in Aleksinsky Rural Okrug of Pereslavsky District
- Mikhalevo, Pervomaysky District, Yaroslavl Oblast, a village in Prechistensky Rural Okrug of Pervomaysky District
- Mikhalevo, Mikhaylovsky Rural Okrug, Rybinsky District, Yaroslavl Oblast, a village in Mikhaylovsky Rural Okrug of Rybinsky District
- Mikhalevo, Mikhaylovsky Rural Okrug, Rybinsky District, Yaroslavl Oblast, a village in Mikhaylovsky Rural Okrug of Rybinsky District
- Mikhalevo, Pokrovsky Rural Okrug, Rybinsky District, Yaroslavl Oblast, a village in Pokrovsky Rural Okrug of Rybinsky District
- Mikhalevo, Chebakovsky Rural Okrug, Tutayevsky District, Yaroslavl Oblast, a village in Chebakovsky Rural Okrug of Tutayevsky District
- Mikhalevo, Pomogalovsky Rural Okrug, Tutayevsky District, Yaroslavl Oblast, a village in Pomogalovsky Rural Okrug of Tutayevsky District
- Mikhalevo, Uglichsky District, Yaroslavl Oblast, a village in Pokrovsky Rural Okrug of Uglichsky District

== Abolished localities ==
- Mikhalevo, Anosovsky Selsoviet, Parfenyevsky District, Kostroma Oblast, a village in Anosovsky Selsoviet of Parfenyevsky District in Kostroma Oblast; abolished on October 18, 2004
