= ART4.RU Contemporary Art Museum =

Museum in Moscow, Russia

The ART.4U Contemporary Art Museum
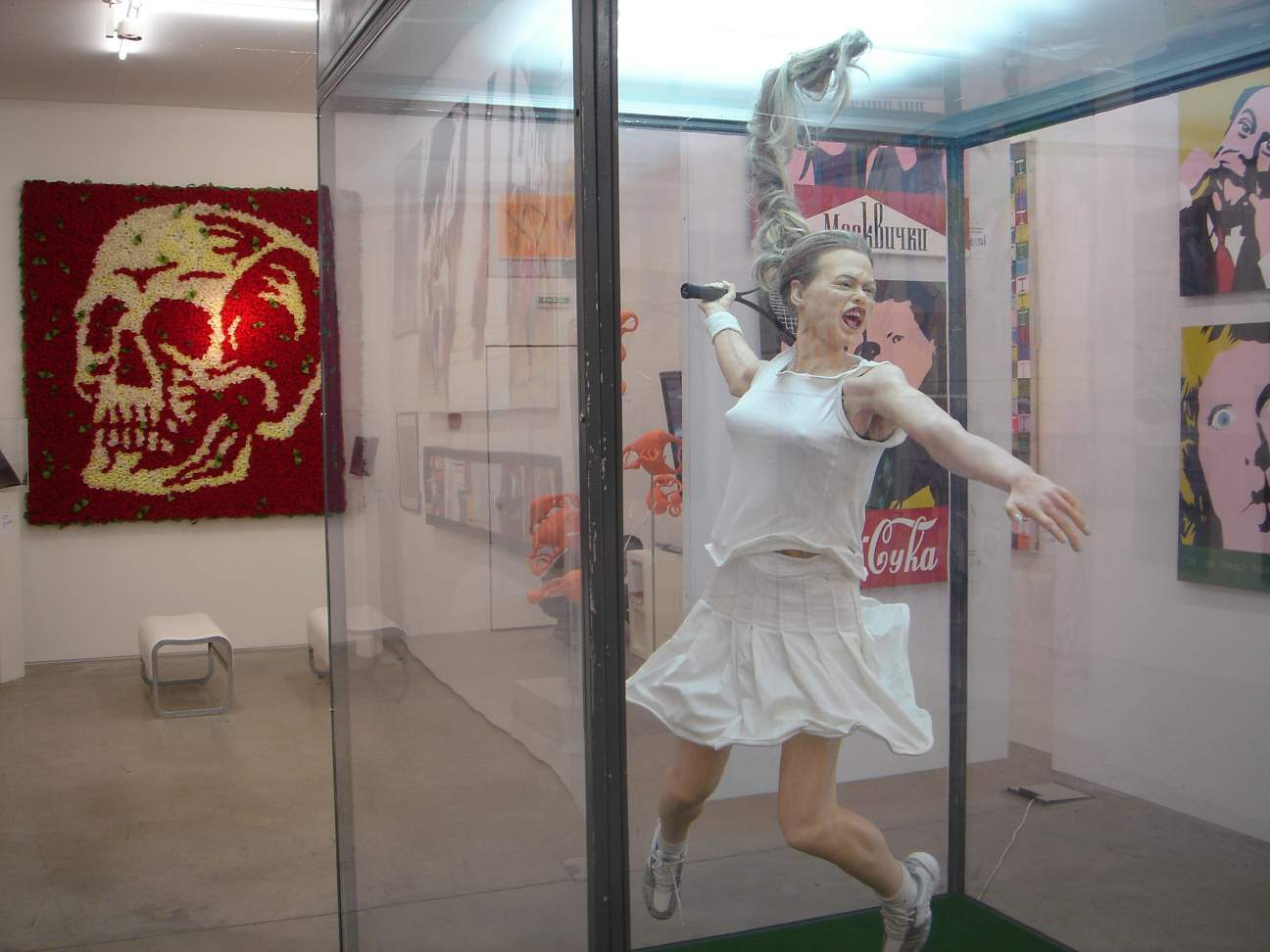

- Location within Moscow
- Established: May 2007
- Location: Moscow, Russia
- Coordinates: 55.7578°N 37.6031°E
- Website: www.art4.ru

ART4.RU Contemporary Art Museum is a museum of contemporary Russian art located in Moscow, Russia. It was opened to the public in May 2007. A privately owned institution, it houses the collection of Igor Markin.

== The Collection ==
The Museum often lends works in its permanent collection to exhibitions organized by other institutions in Russia and worldwide, such as in the National Centre for Contemporary Arts 2009 exhibition, "In Pursuit of Meaning: Alexander Ney" and, more recently, in the Moscow Museum of Modern Art's 2012 retrospective "Leonid Sokov: Point of View".

The collection includes works of artists:

- Alexeev Alexeev
- Brodsky Alexander
- Brusilovsky Mikhail
- Bruskin Grisha
- Bugaev Sergei (Africa)
- Bulatov Erik
- Dubossarsky Vladimir
- Duritskaya Natalia
- Infante Arana Francisco
- Kabakov Ilya
- Komar & Melamid
- Kosolapov Alexander
- Kulik Oleg
- Mikhailov Boris
- Molitor & Kuzmin
- Neizvestny Ernst
- Nemukhin Vladimir
- Ney Alexander
- Novikov Timur
- Osmolovsky Anatoly
- Plavinsky Dmitry
- Ponomarev Alexandr
- Prigov Dmitry
- Pusenkoff George
- Pushnitsky Vitaly
- Rabin Oscar
- Roginsky Mikhail
- Shutov Sergei
- Tselkov Oleg
- Yakovlev Vladimir
- Yankilevsky Vladimir
- Zakharov Vadim
- Zverev Anatoly
