= Freken Bock (Cafe) =

Art-café in Rostov Oblast, Russia

- Фрекен Бок (кафе) (Russian)
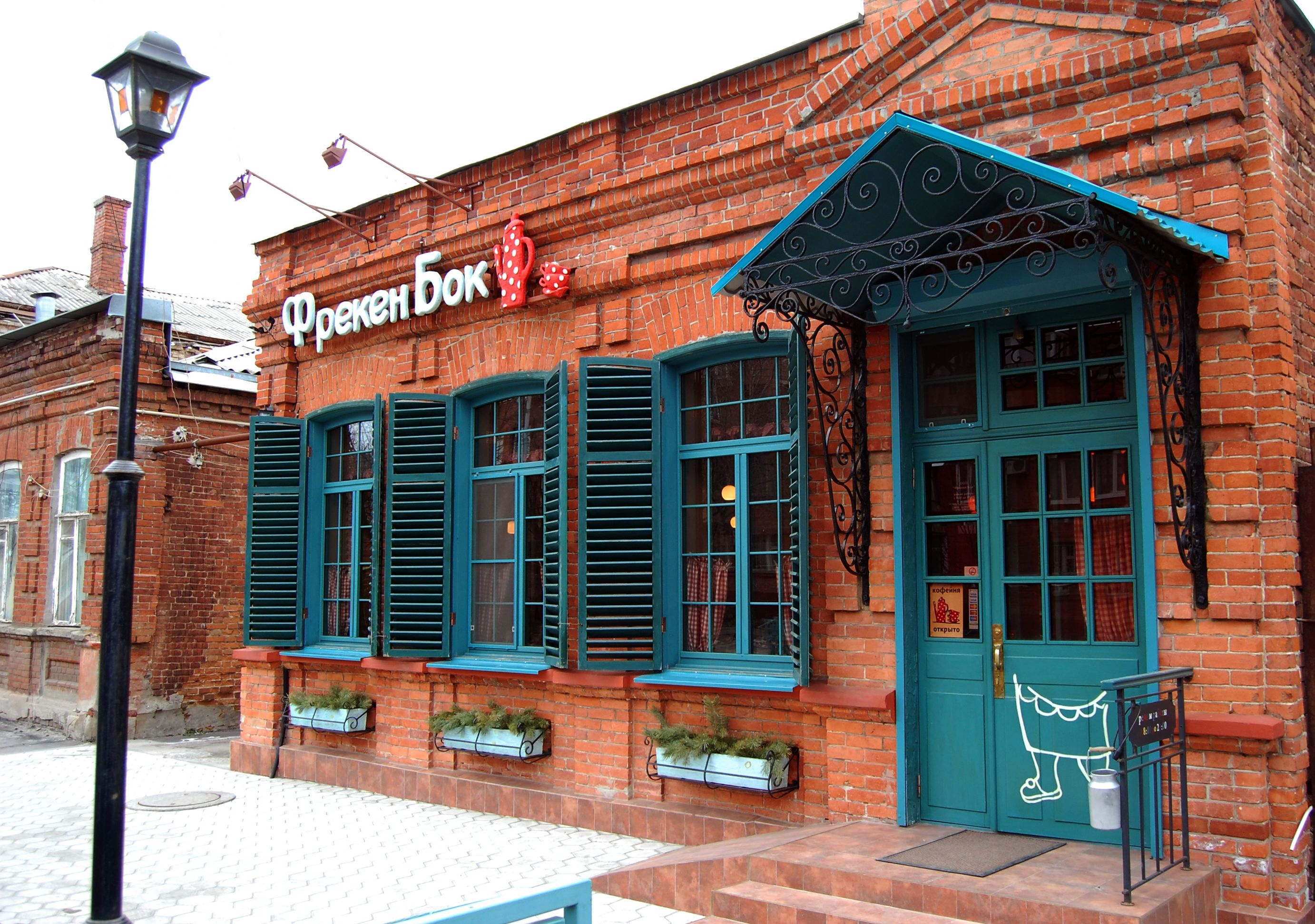

- Location within Rostov Oblast Location within European Russia
- 47.210749°N 38.932113°E
- Type: Art-cafe
- Location: Taganrog, Rostov oblast Russia

History
- Built: 2009

Site notes
- Architect: Olga Grishagina
- Owner: Olga Evstratyeva

Freken Bock (Russian: Фрекен Бок) is an art-cafe in Taganrog created near the parents' house and the monument of Faina Ranevskaya in 2009.

== History of cafe ==
Cafe "Freken Bock" was created by philologist Olga Evstratyeva. It was opened for visitors in September 2009 in a small mansion of the XIX century at the address: 24, Turgenevsky lane. The interior decisionss of the cafe are permeated with the spirit of well-known books of Astrid Lindgren and decorated with Faina Ranevskaya's photos. The main interior line of the cafe is based on the visual series of the cartoon "Kid and Carlson". The interior and exterior are designed by Olga Grishagina (studio "Baza-design"). Since 2011, the "Freken Bok" cafe is used as one of platforms of the Chekhov Book Festival, where meetings with writers are held.

The cafe hosts poetry evenings, chamber theater performances and small art exhibitions. Nonna Malygina's theater repeatedly presented to public the performances according to Chekhov, Averchenko, Taffy's stories.

== About the building ==
The site on which №. 24 is located belonged to the nobleman N. Nikolaev until the 1870s, and later to his heirs. At that time there was only one house the site, a two-story building which has survived to the present day and is located at the address 22, Turgenevsky Lane. In the middle of the 1890s the jeweller's wife, the bourgeois B.G. Lyakhovskaya became the owner of the site.

Probably in 1895 the Lyakhovskys built two brick one-storey houses on the plot, separated by gates. These houses were absolutely identical in the mirror image they have 3 windows and a front door.

According to "The inventory and assessment of real estate of Taganrog" in 1915 the site to the address Depaldovsky Lane 24 belonged to the businessman Solomon Aronovich Berlin and was estimated at 8,000 rubles.

After municipalization in 1925 all three houses were converted to residential apartments.

In the house number 24 in the 1990s was a private recruiting agency "Ankor" (employment office).

== Cafe "Freken Bock" in art ==
Cafe "Freken Bok" is mentioned in the poem of Yuri Ryashentsev "Taganrog" (2014).

== Famous visitors ==
- Andolenko, Karina Vyacheslavovna - a Russian actress of theater and cinema.
- Bardin, Harry Yakovlevich - Russian animator.
- Bondarenko, Igor Mikhailovich - Soviet and Russian writer.
- Voinovich, Vladimir Nikolaevich is a Russian writer, poet and playwright.
- Galtsev, Yuri Nikolayevich - Russian pop artist, actor of theater and cinema, Honored Artist of Russia.
- Hasanov, Rufat Raufovich - an Azerbaijani film director.
- Gerasimov, Evgeny Vladimirovich - Soviet and Russian actor of theater and cinema, film director, People's Artist of the Russian Federation.
- Hoffmann, Leonid Davidovich - Russian composer and theorist, honored worker of culture and arts of STS.
- Doga, Evgeny Dmitrievich - Moldovan Soviet composer, teacher, People's Artist of the USSR.
- Duritskaya, Natalia Ivanovna - a Russian artist.
- Durov, Lev Konstantinovich - Soviet and Russian actor of theater and cinema, People's Artist of the USSR.
- Makarova, Inna Vladimirovna - Soviet and Russian actress, People's Artist of the USSR.
- Malikov, Dmitry Yurievich - Russian composer, pianist, singer, actor, producer and TV presenter.
- Petrenko, Alexei Vasilyevich - Soviet and Russian actor of theater and cinema, People's Artist of the RSFSR.
- Pilipenko, Galina Anatolyevna - a Russian journalist.
- Pirogov, Kirill Alfredovich - Russian actor of theater and cinema, Honored Artist of Russia.
- Raikin, Konstantin Arkadevich - Russian actor of theater and cinema, the head of the Moscow theater "Satyricon".
- Rozhdestvensk, Ekaterina Robertovna - translator of fiction, journalist, photographer.
- Ryashentsev, Yury Evgenevich - Soviet and Russian poet, novelist, screenwriter, songwriter for theater and cinema, translator.
- Fokin, Vladimir Petrovich - Soviet and Russian film director, screenwriter and actor, People's Artist of Russia.
- Khutsiev, Marlen Martynovich - Soviet and Russian film director, screenwriter, actor, teacher, People's Artist of the USSR.
- Shabelnikov, Yuri Leonidovich - Russian artist.
- Yasnov, Mikhail Davidovich - a Russian poet and translator.

== Achievements ==
- In 2010, received a diploma for the most original author's drink "Coffee Mojito" at the Interregional "Championship of Culinary Arts and Service "Don Hospitality"".
- In February 2011 the barista of the cafe "Freken Bok" was among the finalists of the South-Russian qualifying stage of the Russian championship "Barista-2011".
- In March 2013, in Krasnodar, barista cafe "Freken Bok" Maria Attar became the winner of the southern qualifying stage of the Russian Championship Barista 2013 - "Cup of the South".
- In November 2014 in Rostov-on-Don, barista cafe Semyon Demin took the 4th place at the qualifying stage of the 7th international Kremlin culinary cup.

== Interesting facts ==
- There is an opinion that Freken Bok cafe is a "real monument" to Faina Ranevskaya, unlike the "official" monument to the great actress opened nearby in 2008 in so unloved her Lyali's image from the movie "Foundling".
- Some tourists come to Taganrog for visiting the cafe "Freken Bok".
- To the 155th birthday of Anton Pavlovich Chekhov at the cafe "Freken Bok" was tasting dishes described in his works.
