= Igor Markin =

Russian entrepreneur

Igor Nikolaevich Markin
- Игорь Николаевич Маркин
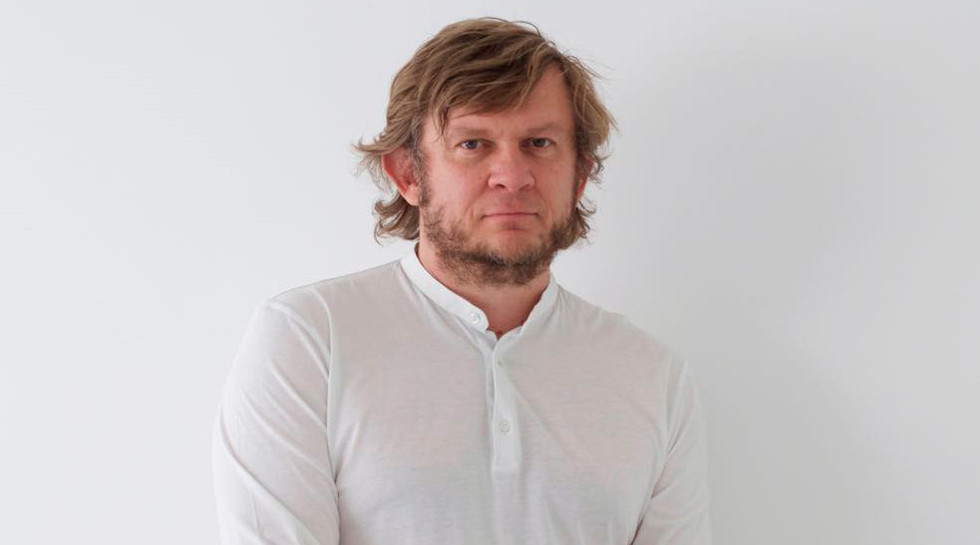
- Born: 1967 (age 58–59); Moscow
- Education: Moscow Electrotechnical Institute of Communications
- Occupations: Entrepreneur, art collector
- Known for: ART4.RU Contemporary Art Museum

Igor Nikolaevich Markin (Russian: Игорь Николаевич Маркин; born 1967) is a Russian entrepreneur and art collector. In 2007, he founded a private art museum in Moscow.

Igor Markin's collection includes about 1500 works by more than 250 authors. Most of the collection is occupied by works by representatives of the so-called “second wave of the Russian avant-garde”: Anatoly Zverev, Eduard Gorokhovsky, Mikhail Grobman, Yuri Zlotnikov, Dmitry Krasnopevtsev, Vladimir Nemukhin, Dmitry Plavinsky, Yulo Sooster, Eduard Steinberg, Alexander Kharitonov, Vladimir Yakovlev and others.

The collection also includes works by representatives of the Moscow Conceptualists: Ilya Kabakov, Viktor Pivovarov and others; Sots Art: Eric Bulatov, Vitaly Komar and Alexander Melamid, Boris Orlov and others; New Artists: Sergei Bugaev (Africa), Georgy Guryanov, Oleg Kotelnikov, Timur Novikov, Vladislav Mamyshev-Monro and others. The collection includes works by Alexander Vinogradov and Vladimir Dubosarsky, Oleg Kulik, Alexei Kalima, Yuri Shabelnikov, Valery Koshlyakov, Pavel Pepperstein, Leonid Purygin, Semyon Faibisovich, Oleg Tselkov, as well as works by many young promising authors: Evgeny Antufiev, Dunya Zakharova, Anya Zhelud, Vasya Horst, Irina Korina, Liza Bobkova, Vasily Kononov-Gredin, Dima Filippov, and many others.

== Biography ==
Igor Markin was born in 1967 in Moscow. He graduated from the Moscow Electrotechnical Institute of Communications, and after graduation worked at the Radio Research Institute. From 1993 to 2016, he was co-owner and president of Proplex, a group of companies engaged in the production of window profiles. In 1997, he began collecting art.

In the late 1990s, I had a need to cover a hole in the wall in a new apartment. I was already a small businessman at the time and had bought some inexpensive apartment. I accidentally closed that hole with Yakovlev, Zverev and something else. Yakovlev's and Zverev's works were hung somewhere near the hallway, and as I walked past them every day, I saw how much it affected me. I couldn't take my eyes off them, couldn't just walk past them. Just like a pretty woman can't walk past a mirror - she's bound to stop and start fancying herself up. And so I was “fancying” at these works. And then I must have gone crazy - I started buying other works as well.

In 2007, Igor Markin opened the ART4.RU Museum of Contemporary Art on the basis of his collection and immediately became one of the most prominent figures in the Russian art sphere.

...The Markin Museum has always, since its opening, been an extremely eccentric institution. In it you could husk seeds, put stickers with the words “yes” and “no” near liked and disliked works, play mini-golf, find among the undisputed originals fake, crafted by the curator of the museum.

Due to the economic crisis, in January 2009 the museum switched to a one-day opening regime, on Fridays, and then began to receive visitors only one night a year.

In December 2015, ART4 Museum relaunched with a new concept and the slogan “A museum that sells art”. All works at ART4 from that time onwards could be bought and the price was announced openly on the label to the work.

In June 2016, ART4 launched online auction of contemporary Russian art of museum level in Russia: at the auction online it was possible to compete for works by artists already represented in the ART4 Museum collection. At the same time, all works could be viewed live in the ART4 Museum.

June 29, 2024 ART4 Museum was closed after 8 years of hosting various exhibitions.

In 2023 Igor Markin and artist Liza Bobkova co-founded ART4 Gallery in London.

== Personal life ==
Igor Markin has 5 children.
