= Sokov =

Sokov (Russian: Соков) is a Russian masculine surname, its feminine counterpart is Sokova. It may refer to

- Ekaterina Sokova (born 2000), Russian artistic gymnast
- Leonid Sokov (1941–2018), Russian nonconformist artist and sculptor
- Mariya Sokova (born 1970), Uzbekistani triple jumper
- Vasiliy Sokov (born 1968), Soviet triple jumper, husband of Mariya
