= Alexander Kosolapov =

Russian-American sculptor and painter

- Born: 1943; Moscow, U.S.S.R.
- Education: Stroganov Moscow State University of Arts and Industry, Surikov Moscow Art Institute
- Known for: Mixed media, sculpture, painting
- Notable work: Lenin and Coca-Cola

Alexander Kosolapov (Russian: Александр Семёнович Косолапов; born April 16, 1943) is a Russian-American sculptor and painter, and a prominent figure of the Sots Art movement. He immigrated to the United States in 1975 and has since lived and worked in New York City.

== Biography ==
In the late 1950s, Kosolapov attended the school of the Surikov Moscow Art Institute. Amongst his classmates were Leonid Sokov and Alexander Yulikov.

After his emigration, the artist played a critical role in assisting in the gathering of materials and clandestine distribution of the unofficial Soviet art magazine A-YA, edited by fellow Russian emigre Igor Chelkovski.

Notable artworks by Kosolapov include Lenin Coca-Cola (1980), Molotov Cocktail (1989), Mickey Lenin (2003), and Malevich Sold Here (1989).

Since his Soviet-era canvases (one of which was displayed in Times Square in 1982), he has produced more modern works, including Mickey Mouse sharing a conversation with Jesus, Tatlin's Tower leaning away from the clutches of a skeleton, and a Mercedes sporting an onion dome.

Kosolapov’s artwork is influenced by his life in Moscow and New York City, and his criticisms of both the United States and Soviet Russia. His work addresses both American consumerism and capitalism, and the ideological practices of the Soviet Union, through use of recognizable brands and figures, politics, references of pop culture, and bright, bold colors, which are reminiscent of Soviet propaganda artwork of the late 1950’s and 1960’s.

Kosolapov became interested in the visual language associated with Western contemporary art, which he encountered in magazines at the Library of Foreign Literature in Moscow. During this time, he covertly studied the works of the Russian avant-garde movement, through unauthorized visits to the Tretyakov Gallery’s storage rooms. These encounters– with both modernist experimentation, and Soviet ideological art– shaped his later interest in the crossover between official propaganda and mass-media imagery.

== Sots Art ==
Sots Art, described as a combination of socialist realism and Pop Art, was a form of communist propaganda that was compared or equated to the rise of consumerism in western markets. Sots was meant as a means to provoke and mock Russian authorities, while also reflecting the dirty humor circulating in the Soviet Union– making fun of leaders, rituals, and slogans. While this artwork was tolerated by Russian authorities due to the Soviet ideology behind it, it was sometimes considered anti-Soviet due to crude or western references. Moreover, the main idea behind Sots Art is that it was created around the idea of knowing the difference between being a true Soviet and an anti-Soviet.

Kosolapov grew up in the center of this movement, as it manifested mainly in Moscow, where he was born, as well as Leningrad. One of Kosolapov’s most notable works, Molotov Cocktail (1989), illustrates the concept of Sots Art as it depicts the Russian authoritarian, Vladimir Lenin, and alludes to a well known American icon, Rosie the Riveter.

== Public collections ==
- The State Russian Museum, St. Petersburg, Russia
- The State Tretyakov Gallery, Moscow, Russia
- The Museum of Modern Art (MoMA), New York
- The Solomon R. Guggenheim Museum, New York
- The New Museum, New York
- The Moscow Museum of Modern Art (MMoMA), Moscow, Russia
- The New York Public Library, New York
- The National Centre for Contemporary Arts, Moscow, Russia
- The ART4.RU Museum of Contemporary Russian Art, Moscow, Russia
- The Jane Voorhees Zimmerli Art Museum at Rutgers University, US
- The Nasher Museum of Art at Duke University, US
- The Mead Art Museum, Massachusetts, US
