= Leonid Sokov =

Russian sculptor

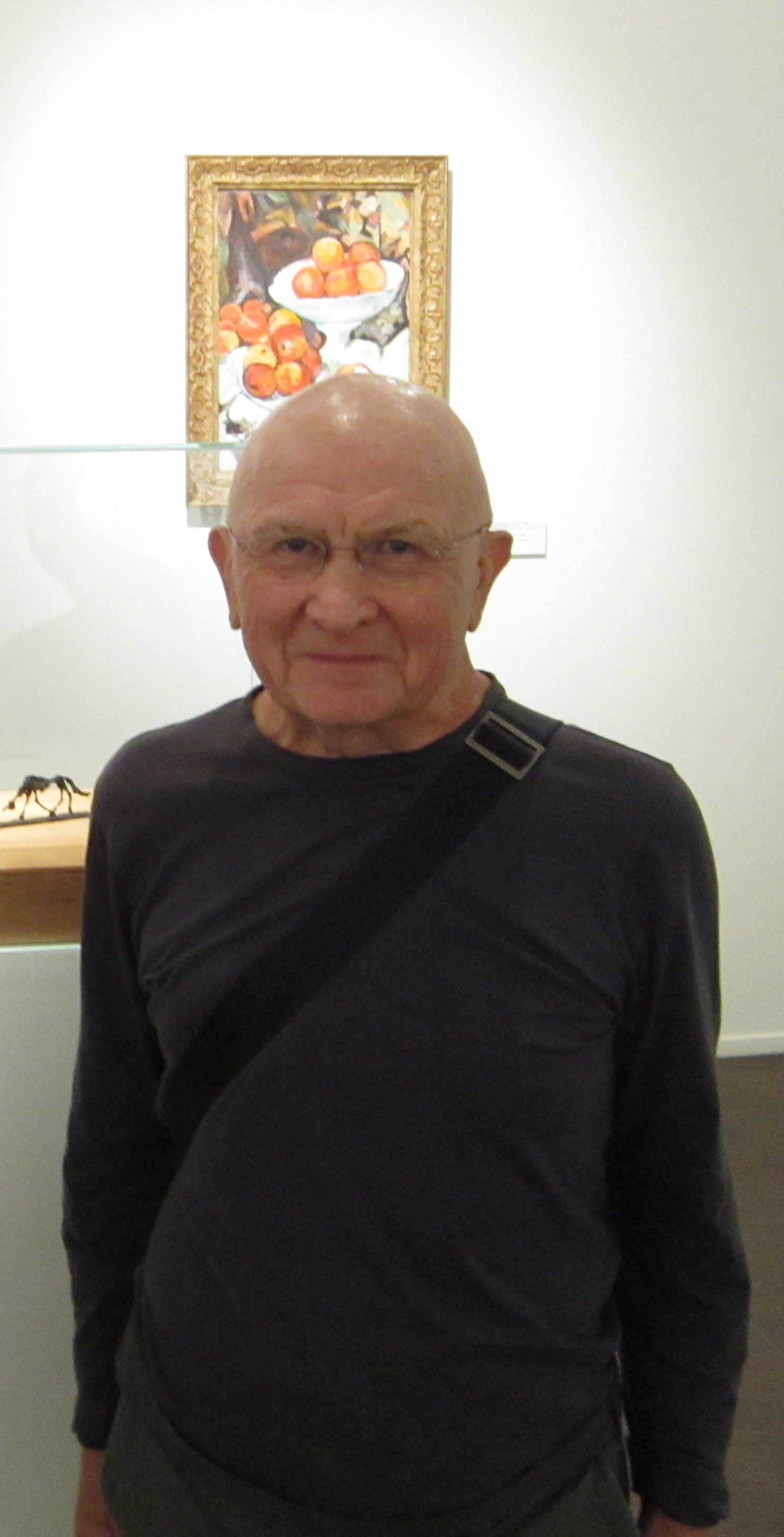
Leonid Sokov in 2012

Leonid Sokov (Russian: Леони́д Петро́вич Со́ков, October 11, 1941, Tver region – April 4, 2018 in Copake, New York, United States) was a Russian nonconformist artist and sculptor. Since 1980, Sokov primarily lived and worked in New York City.

== Life and work ==
Sokov was born in Mikhalevo in the Tver region, Russia in 1941 and graduated from the Stroganov Institute now called the Moscow School of Art and Industry, in 1969. He emigrated to the United States in 1980. His compositions are in the Pop style, adapted to Socialist Realism through the use of ideology as an object of consumption. He is closely related to the Sots art movement and he has worked with others in that genre including Dmitry Prigov, Alexander Kosolapov, and Rostislav Lebedev.

In 2001 he represented Russia at the Venice Biennale. He participated in the 2004 Gwangju Biennale in Gwangju, South Korea.

In 2012, the Moscow Museum of Modern Art (MMoMA) honored the artist's 70th birthday with a major retrospective and publication on the artist's career and work.

In 2013, Zimmerli Art Museum organized a major retrospective Leonid Sokov: Ironic Objects. The exhibition was reviewed in ArtNews and the New York Times.

In 2016, The State Tretyakov Gallery in Moscow held a major retrospective museum show dedicated to the artist's life and work. He had kids

== Public collections ==
- The Metropolitan Museum of Art, New York
- Centre Georges Pompidou, Paris, France
- The State Russian Museum, St. Petersburg, Russia
- The State Tretyakov Gallery, Moscow, Russia
- The State Hermitage Museum, St. Petersburg, Russia
- The Solomon R. Guggenheim Museum, New York
- The Moscow Museum of Modern Art (MMoMA), Moscow, Russia
- The National Centre for Contemporary Arts, Moscow, Russia
- The ART4.RU Museum of Contemporary Russian Art, Moscow, Russia
- The Jane Voorhees Zimmerli Art Museum at Rutgers University, USA
- The Nasher Museum of Art at Duke University, USA
- The Cleveland Museum of Art, USA
