= A-YA =

- Cover #4
- Editors-in-chief: Alexander Sidorov, Igor Shelkovsky
- Categories: Art magazine
- Frequency: Yearly
- Circulation: 7,000/3,000
- Founded: 1979
- Final issue: 1986
- Country: USSR, France
- Language: Russian, English

A-YA (A-JA), Cyrillic: a-Я — журнал неофициального русского искусства (English: Magazine of Unofficial Russian Art), was an underground Russian art revue. A-YA was illegally prepared in the Soviet Union and then published in Paris from 1979 to 1986.

The editors were Alexander Sidorov (under the pseudonym "Alexej Alexejev") in Moscow and Igor Shelkovsky in Paris. A-YA was distributed in the U.S. by Alexander Kosolapov in New York. It consisted of 60 pages in A4 format. There were 3000 copies per edition (the first edition numbered 7000). A-YA was printed in both color and black and white.

A-YA introduced a wider international audience to contemporary Soviet and Russian art that had received limited public exposure outside the Soviet Union. The publication featured the work of artists such as Eric Bulatov, Ilya Kabakov, Dmitry Prigov and many others.

In 2004, the entire run was reprinted as one volume by ArtChronika with a new foreword by Shelkovsky as A-YA - Unofficial Russian Art Review: 1979-1986 (ISBN 9785902647010).
