= Mikhalevo, Gryazovetsky District, Vologda Oblast =

Mikhalevo Михалево
- Village
- Location within Vologda Oblast Location within Russia
- Coordinates: 59°01′N 40°06′E
- Country: Russia
- Region: Vologda Oblast
- District: Gryazovetsky District
- Time zone: UTC+3:00

Mikhalevo (Russian: Михалево) is a rural locality (a village) in Pertsevskoye Rural Settlement, Gryazovetsky District, Vologda Oblast, Russia. The population was 6 as of 2002.

== Geography ==
Mikhalevo is located 22 km north of Gryazovets (the district's administrative centre) by road. Baksheyka is the nearest rural locality.
