= Mikhalevo, Shelotsky Selsoviet, Verkhovazhsky District, Vologda Oblast =

Mikhalevo Михалёво
- Village
- Location within Vologda Oblast Location within Russia
- Coordinates: 60°21′N 41°50′E
- Country: Russia
- Region: Vologda Oblast
- District: Verkhovazhsky District
- Time zone: UTC+3:00

Mikhalevo (Russian: Михалёво) is a rural locality (a village) in Shelotskoye Rural Settlement, Verkhovazhsky District, Vologda Oblast, Russia. The population was 13 as of 2002.

== Geography ==
The distance to Verkhovazhye is 82.5 km, to Shelota is 13 km. Stepachevskaya, Stolbovo, Akinkhovskaya, Anisimovskaya are the nearest rural localities.
