= Vitaly Pushnitsky =

Russian painter (born 1967)

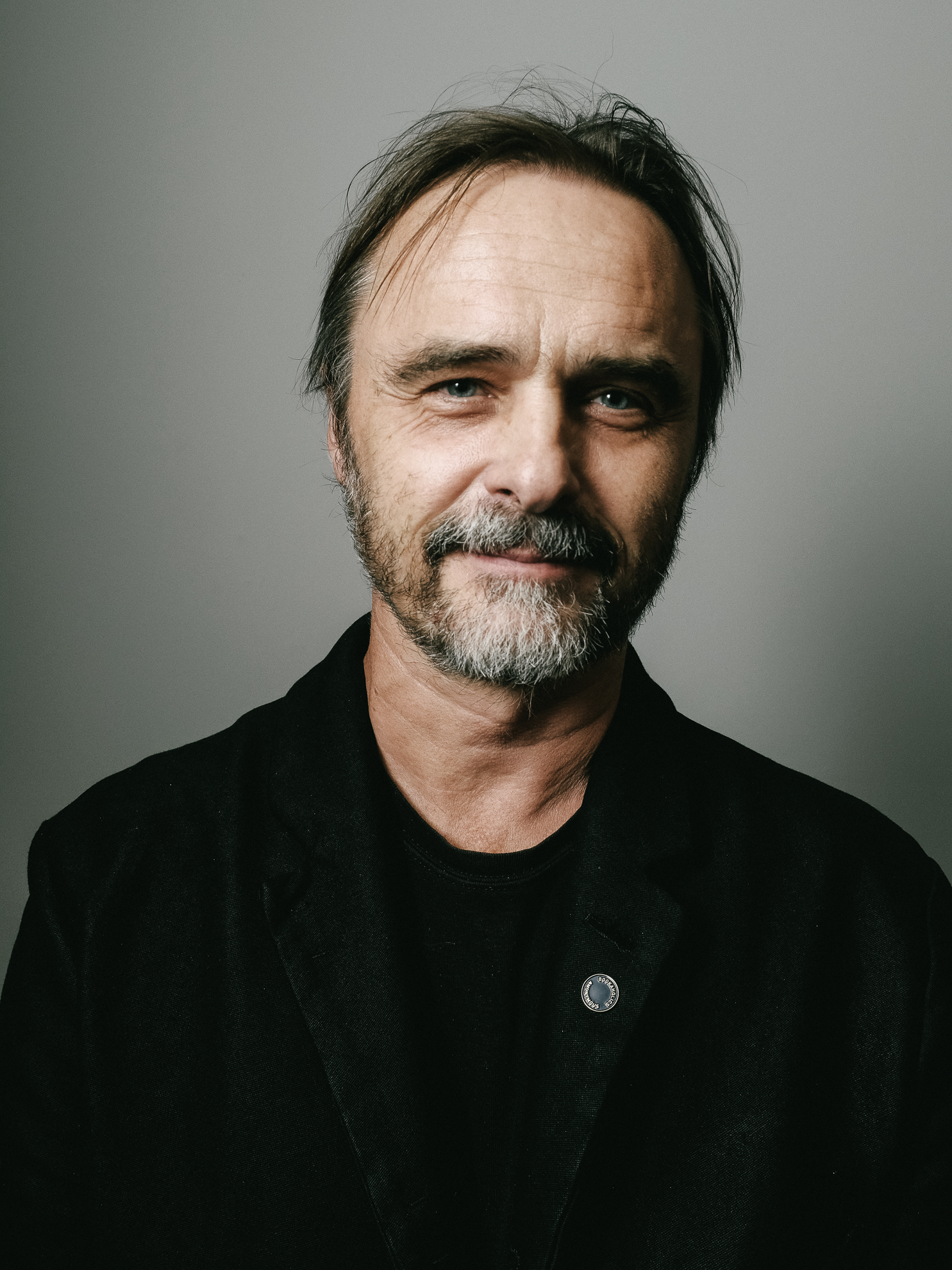
- Born: 7 July 1967; Leningrad, Union of Soviet Socialist Republics (now Saint-Petersburg, Russian Federation)
- Education: St. Petersburg State Academic Institute of Fine Arts, Sculpture and Architecture
- Known for: Painting, drawing, sculpture, installation
- Awards: Sergey Kuryokhin Award for Contemporary Art, 2012
- Website: pushnitsky.ru

Vitaly Pushnitsky (Russian: Вита́лий Ю́рьевич Пушни́цкий; born 7 July 1967) is a Russian artist. He is considered one of Russia's leading contemporary artists. He is based in Saint-Petersburg, Russia and is internationally recognized as a painter, sculptor, graphic artist and as a creator of installations, art objects and multimedia.

== Biography ==
Vitaly Pushnitsky was born on 7 July 1967 in Leningrad, Union of Soviet Socialist Republics (USSR). After leaving Leningrad Secondary Art School, he studied at the Graphics Department of St.Petersburg Academy of Arts (1988–1994). Since 1994, he has been a member of Saint Petersburg Union of Artists.

He has had exhibitions at the Kala Art Institute (2002), at Jawaharlal Nehru University in New Delhi (2005), at the Tamarind Institute at University of New Mexico (2007), as well as at Cité International des Arts in Paris in 2012.

Pushnitsky's personal exhibitions took place at the State Russian Museum (2002) and the State Hermitage Museum (2006) in St.Petersburg, at the Moscow Museum of Modern Art (2012) and elsewhere.

Collaborating with the major Russian and western art galleries, Pushnitsky is conducting his own original exhibition project "Belka&Strelka" co-authored with an art critic and curator Dmitry Pilikin. Pushnitsky's works are generally presented on the international art scene.

In 2011 the British art publisher Phaidon Press included Vitaly Pushnitsky in the list of "115 artists working internationally who have been nominated by highly respected critics and curators for their outstanding contributions to recent painting".

== Gallery ==
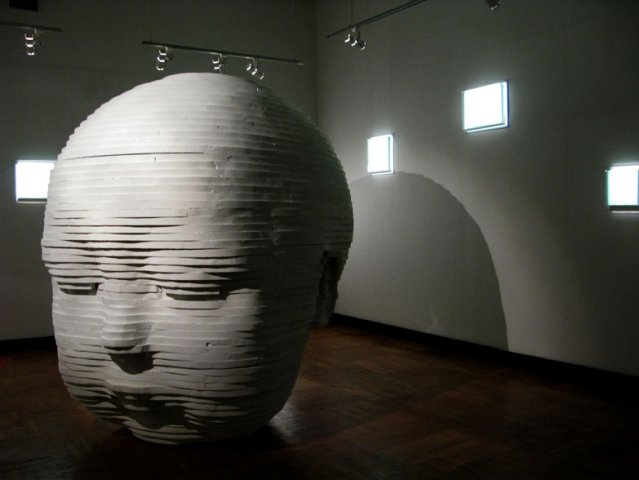
"Son", foam-propylene, 300x300x300 cm, 2008

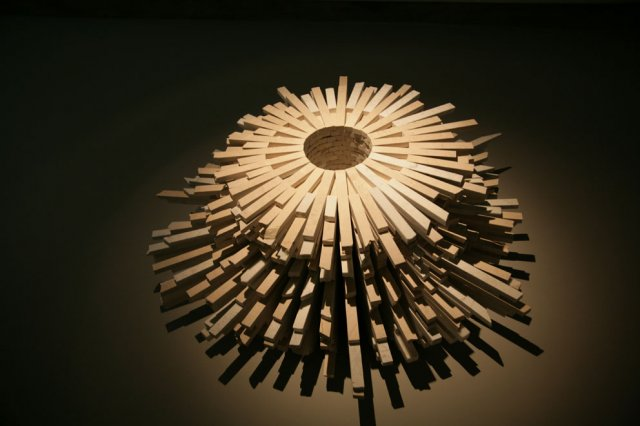
"Structure of Time", marble, 45x60 cm, 2009

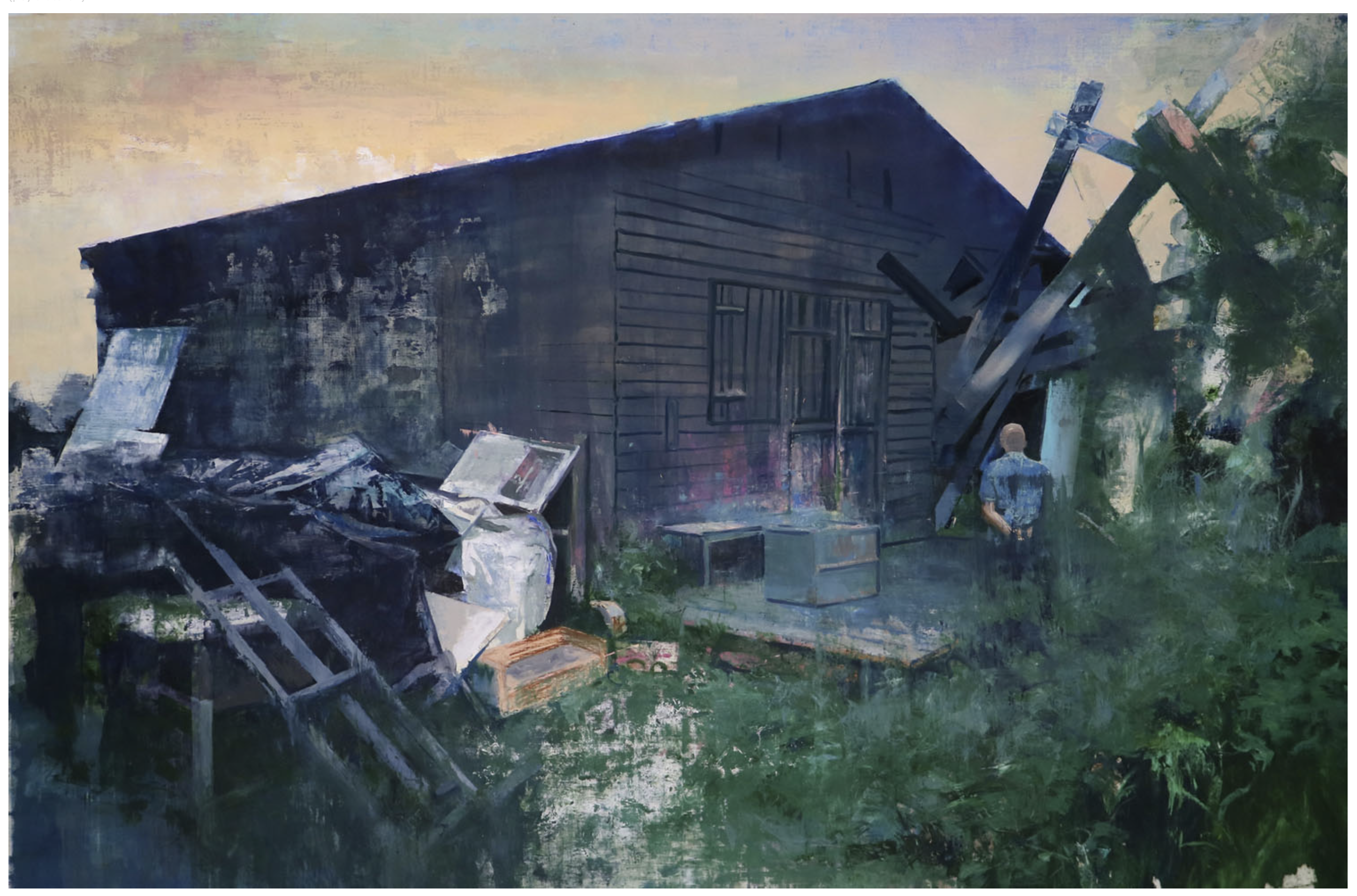
"Studio. Waiting #16", oil on canvas, 195x295 cm, 2018

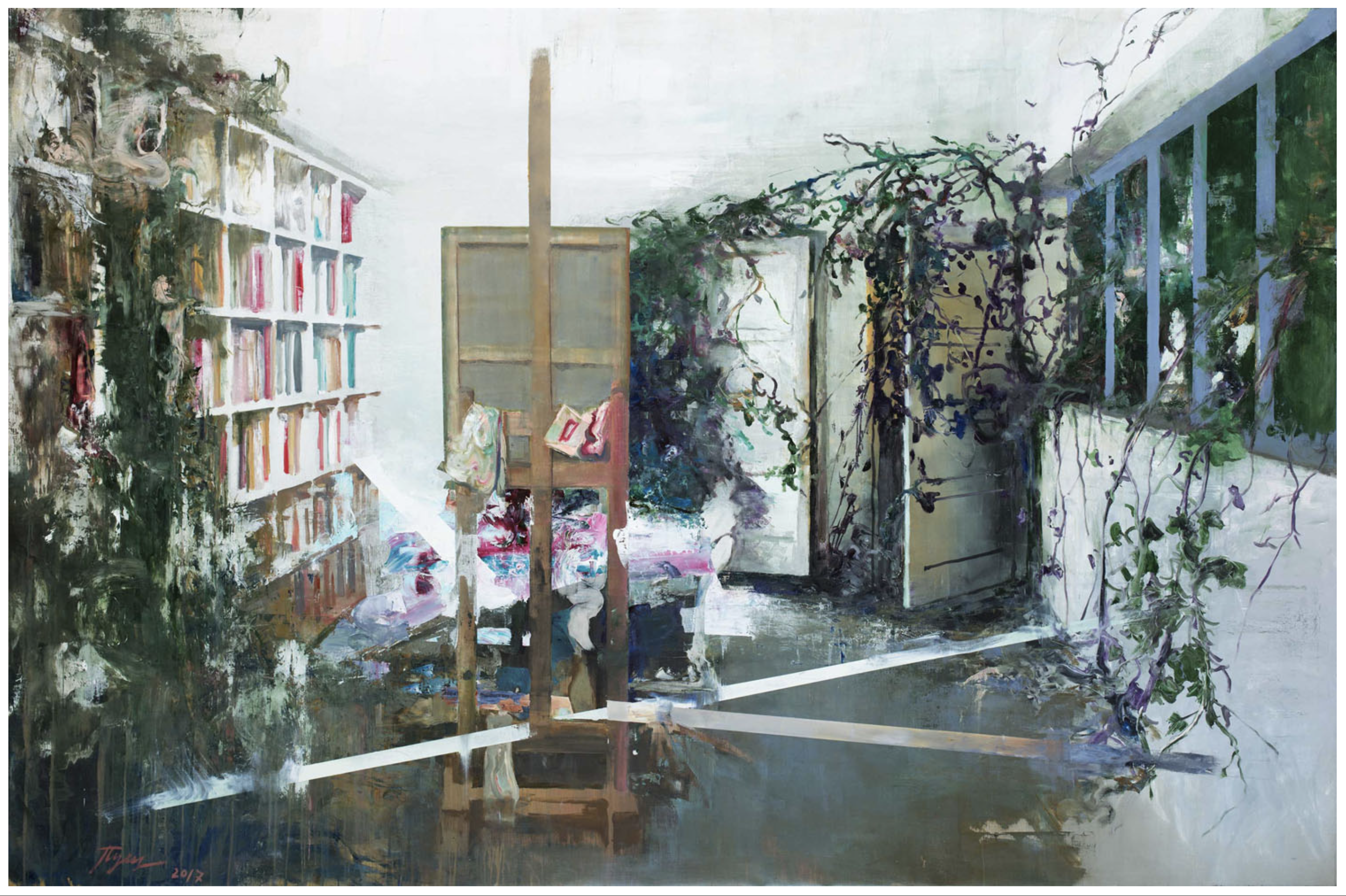
"Studio. Waiting #14", oil on canvas, 190x290 cm, 2018

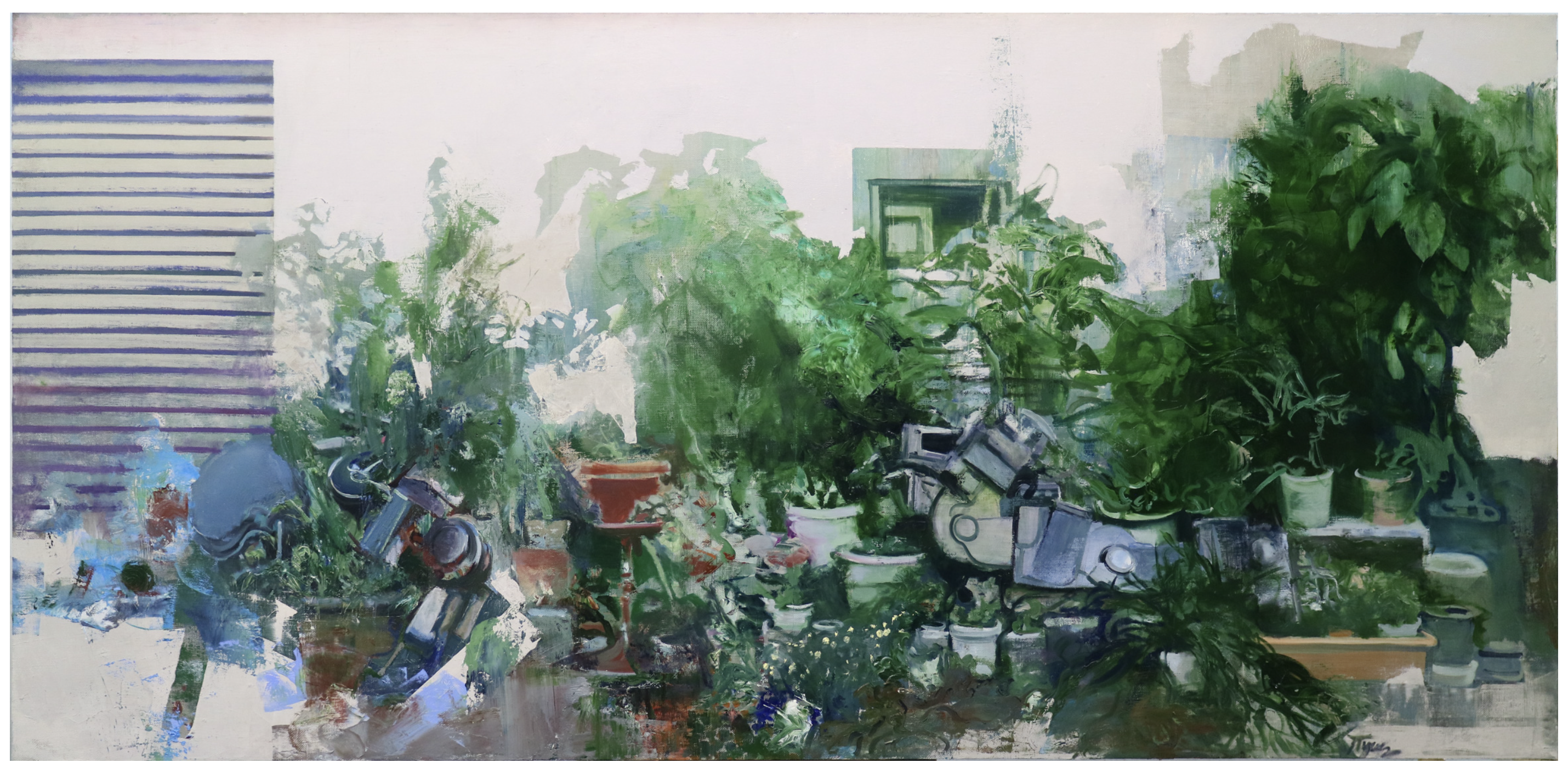
Tokyo. Moth Flight Observation", oil on canvas, 130x250 cm, 2019

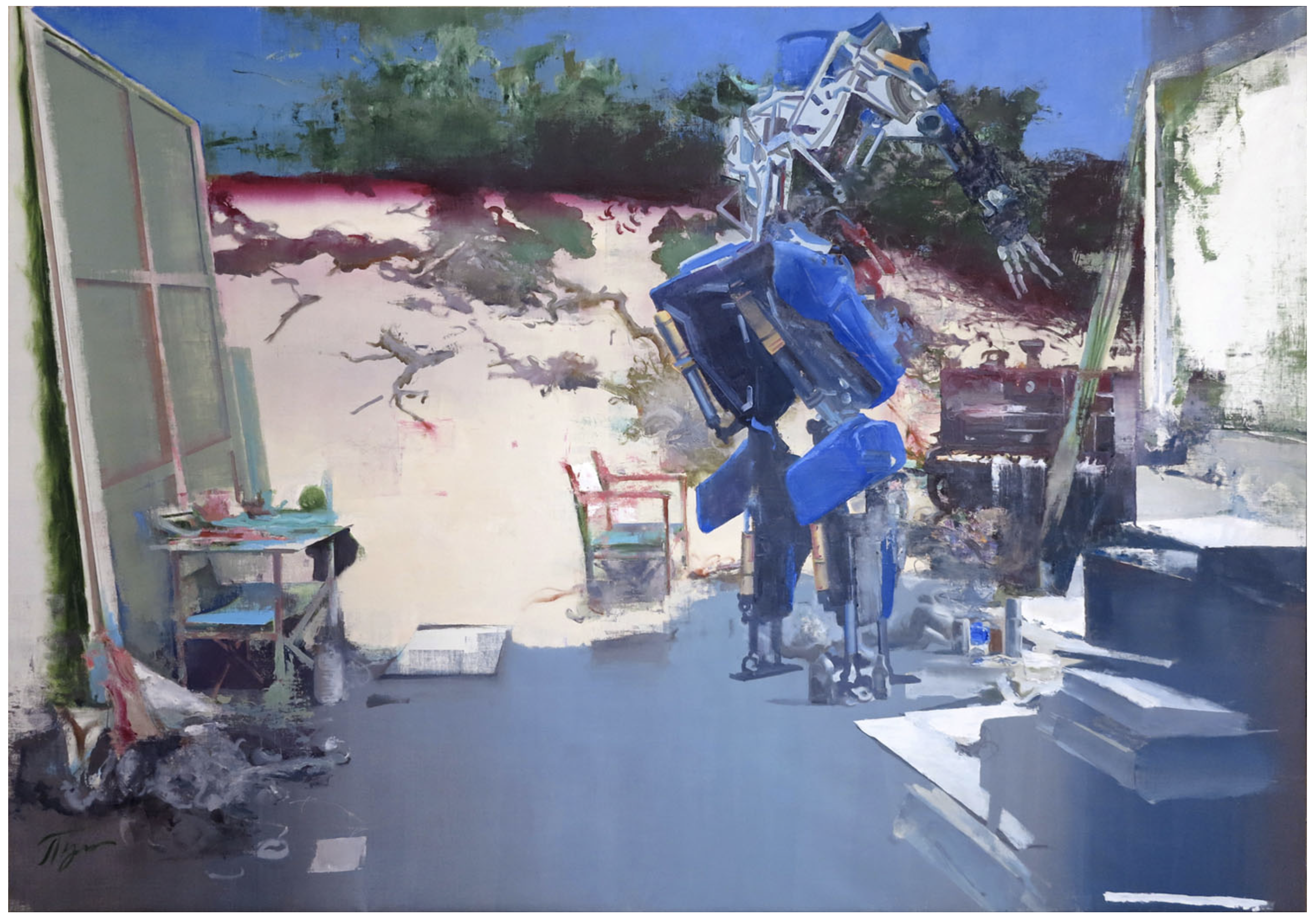
Studio. My eyes having observed all sums, returned to the white chrysanthemums, oil on canvas, 190x295 cm, 2019

== Museum collections and foundations ==
- The State Russian Museum. St Petersburg, Russia
- Moscow Museum of Modern Art. Russia
- The Museum of Contemporary Art ERARTA. St Petersburg, Russia
- Novy Museum. St Petersburg, Russia
- ArtLink. New York, USA
- Chairman, Aldrich Museum of Art. New York, USA
- Contemporary Art Museum art4.ru. Moscow, Russia
- Freud's Dream Museum. St Petersburg, Russia
- Kala Art Institute. Berkeley, San Francisco, USA
- Kolding Art Institute. Kolding, Denmark
- Kolodzei Art Foundation, Highland Park, NJ, USA
- Perm Museum of Contemporary Art (PERMM), Perm, Russia
- Red Bull Collection, Salzburg, Austria
- RuArts Foundation. Moscow, Russia
- The Krasnoyarsk Museum Centre. Krasnoyarsk, Russia
- The National Centre of Contemporary Art. Moscow, Russia
- The State Kaliningrad Art Gallery. Kaliningrad, Russia
- The State Novosibirsk Art Museum. Novosibirsk, Russia

== Solo exhibitions ==
2025

- Studio. Waiting. A. V. Shchusev State Museum of Architecture. Moscow

2024

- Friday. 3L gallery. Moscow
- Island. pop/off/art gallery. Moscow

2023

- Fields. Shtager&Shch gallery. London. UK
- Orpheus in Hades. Marina Gishich gallery. Saint Petersburg

2022

- Garden. Gallery GROUND Solyanka. Moscow

2021

- GAP. pop/off/art. Moscow

2020

- Ampersand. Marina Gishich gallery. Saint Petersburg
- BREATH. Erika Deák Gallery. Budapest. Hungary

2019

- Growing. Painting. AlexanderGallery. Ross. Montenegro
- Growing. Painting. pop/off/art. Moscow

2018

- Growing. Painting. pop/off/art. Moscow
- Tribute. Painting. New Museum of Aslan Chekhoev. Saint Petersburg

2017

- Tribute. Erika Déak Gallery. Budapest. Hungary
- Tribute. Masters School. Saint Petersburg

2016

- Waiting. Marina Gisich Gallery. Saint Petersburg

2015

- Practical actions. RuArts Gallery. Moscow

2014

- Practical actions. RuArts Gallery. Moscow
- Point of View. Moons. pop/off/art. Moscow
- INDEX 14. Savina Gallery. Saint Petersburg
- INDEX 13/14. Ural Vision Gallery. Ekaterinburg

2013

- Postponed cases. Marina Gisich Gallery. Saint Petersburg
- Points of view. Part III. TC Galeria D'Art. Barcelona. Spain

2012

- Points of view. Part II. New Museum of Aslan Chekhoev. Saint Petersburg
- Points of view. Part I. Erika Déak Gallery. Budapest. Hungary
- Mechanisms of time. Moscow Museum of Modern Art. Moscow
- Point. pop/off/art. Moscow

2011

- Birth Date. Sputnik Gallery. NY. USA
- True Blue Will Never Stain. Frantz Space Gallery. NY. USA
- Point. Korjaamo Gallery. Helsinki. Finland
- Exit. Marina Gisich Gallery. Saint Petersburg
- Burn. Al-Gallery. Saint Petersburg

2010

- Scale Measurement. TC Galeria D'Art. Barcelona. Spain
- Vitaly Pushnitsky. Perm State Art Gallery. Permian
- Within the framework of the 6th Novosibirsk Graphic Biennale. Novosibirsk State Art Museum. Novosibirsk
- Returned light. Krasnoyarsk Museum Center. Krasnoyarsk

2009

- Prisons, Templesand Banks. Huset Guldager Gallery. Bloven. Denmark
- Here and now. Fabrika project. Moscow
- Here and now. Al-Gallery. Saint Petersburg
- Camera: Solitary Confinement. RuArts Foundation for the Promotion of Contemporary Art. Moscow

2008

- SON. Al-Gallery. Saint Petersburg
- Reconstruction. Gallery Atelier No. 2. Moscow
- Incidere Venezia.pop/off/art. Moscow.
- Burn. Frantz Space Gallery. NY. USA
- Date of birth. Marina Gisich Gallery. Saint Petersburg

2007

- Letters from the outskirts of the Empire. Al-Gallery. Saint Petersburg
- LUX. pop/off/art. Moscow.

2006

- Iron Age. State Hermitage Museum. National Center for Contemporary Art. Saint Petersburg
- Atmosphere. Huset Gallery Guldager. Grindstead. Denmark

2005

- Roots. Terra Artis. Kuhmalahti. Tampere. Finland
- Reaction. Gallery D-137. Saint Petersburg
- Prints. AM Gallery. pARTner Gallery. Moscow

2004

- Introspection. Gallery of Marat Gelman. Moscow

2003

- Broadcast. State Center of Photography of the Ministry of Culture of the Russian Federation. Saint Petersburg
- Sky. Gallery "KvadraT". Saint Petersburg
- Joseph Brodsky. Urania. Anna Akhmatova Museum. Saint Petersburg
- Naked Light. White Space Gallery. London. Great Britain

2002

- Introspection. State Russian Museum. Saint Petersburg

2001

- Poet of the Iron Age. Gallery-103. Pushkinskaya10. Saint Petersburg
- Circenses et Panem. Hülstebro Musik Theatre. Holstebro. Denmark

2000

- Inventory. Kunstkamera.Festival Contemporary art in a traditional museum. Saint Petersburg
- Introspection. Gallery Garden. Grindstead. Denmark
- Russian Artist. Museum of Olgüd. Olgod. Denmark
- Black boxes of dreams. Museum of Dreams of Sigmund Freud. Saint Petersburg

1999

- Reflections. GalleryA-Z. State Center of Photography of the Ministry of Culture of the Russian Federation. Saint Petersburg

1998

- Reflections. Gallery Garden. Grindstead. Denmark

1997

- Russian Artist.Private Hospital. Aabenra. Denmark
- Russian Artist. Horsens City Library. Horsens. Denmark

1996

- Russian Artist. Political Institute. New Kübing-Falster. Denmark
- Russian Artist.OldHuset.Kolding. Denmark

1995

- River, fan and sword. Gallery "Borey". Saint Petersburg

1994

- Solo. Gallery "Chiron". Saint Petersburg

== Group exhibitions ==
2024

- Reflecting/Reflections. pop/off/art. Moscow
- Third ear. AZ/ART. Moscow
- Summer show. Shtager&Shch. UK. London
- Made at dacha. pop/off/art 2.0. Moscow

2022

- To Be With Art. Exhibition Hall Manege. St Petersburg

2021

- 104 Introductions. 104GALERIE. Tokyo, Japan
- New ruins. Glass. Central Exhibition Hall "Manege". Saint Petersburg

2020

- Behind the clouds of future. DK Gromov. Saint Petersburg
- Location orientation. VIII Moscow Biennale. Tretyakov Gallery on Krymsky Val. Moscow

2019

- Location orientation. VIII Moscow Biennale. Tretyakov Gallery on Krymsky Val. Moscow
- Heroes of our time. Moscow Museum of Modern Art. Moscow
- Life after life. Central Exhibition Hall "Manege". Saint Petersburg
- Beauty +/-. Central Exhibition Hall Manezh. Saint Petersburg
- Either stand or fall. Street Art Museum. Saint Petersburg

2018

- VDNKh (Exhibition of the achievements of some artists). Marina Gisich Gallery. Saint Petersburg
- Choice. Sam Ducan Gallery. Leipzig. Germany
- Exhibition of Sergei Kuryokhin Prize nominees. Center for Contemporary Art named after Sergei Kuryokhin. Saint Petersburg
- Personal approach. Moscow Museum of Modern Art. Moscow
- Under the cover of reality. Marina Gisich Gallery. Saint Petersburg
- Breakthrough. Cultural Foundation "Ekaterina". Moscow

2017

- Structures. Marble Palace. Saint Petersburg
- Interpretations. University Ca'Foscari. Venice. Italy
- Interpretations. 10th Syfest. Academy of Arts. Saint Petersburg

2016

- Current drawing. Museum of Contemporary Art PERMM. Permian
- Painting after painting. Art Gallery of Zurab Tsereteli. Moscow
- The situation of art in the PERMM Museum. Museum of Contemporary Art PERMM. Perm
- Russian Contemporary: Drawing. No Limits. London. UK
- Следы разума. Сyfest NYC. Pratt Institute. NY. USA
- Contemporary Russian artists - participants in the Venice Biennale. Favorites. Central Exhibition Hall "Manege". Saint Petersburg
- Baltic Biennale of Contemporary Art. Saint Petersburg

2015

- Baltic Biennale of Contemporary Art. Saint Petersburg
- Provenance. Marina Gisich Gallery. Saint Petersburg
- Russia. Realism. XXI Century. State Russian Museum. Saint Petersburg
- Painting after Painting. Academy of Arts. Saint Petersburg
- Real in Irreal. Wooyang Museum. Gwangju. Korea
- On my Way. University Ca'Foscari. Venice. Italy
- Grounding. GROUND Sandy. Moscow
- The art of being close. Moscow Museum of Modern Art. Moscow
- The Promise of Landscape. Museum of Contemporary Art PERMM. Perm

2014

- Another capital: contemporary art of St. Petersburg today. Moscow City Museum. Moscow
- Ready to fly? Moscow Museum of Modern Art. Moscow
- New element. Moscow Museum of Modern Art. Moscow
- Live/Vi: Painting and Video in Relationships. State Gallery on Solyanka. Moscow
- Storage conditions. Gallery Anna Nova. Saint Petersburg
- Another house. Frantz Space Gallery, St. Petersburg
- Crystallizations. The Museum Center of Turku. Turku. Finland

2013

- Capital of Nowhere. University Ca'Foscari. Venice. Italy
- Current drawing. State Russian Museum. Saint Petersburg
- NightFall. Gallery Rudolfinum. Prague. Czech

2012

- NOIR. Group exhibition of artists from Ruarts Gallery. RuArts Gallery. Moscow
- Shadow of Time. State Museum-Reserve "Tsaritsyno". Moscow

2011

- New sculpture: chaos and structure. New Museum. Saint Petersburg
- Death of St. Petersburg. Name Gallery. Saint Petersburg
- Artist's book. Erarta Museum of Contemporary Art. Saint Petersburg
- Reverse perspective. pop/off/art. Moscow
- Forum of private collections. Museum of Contemporary Art PERMM. Perm
- Myth. Machine. Person. Erika Deak Gallery. Budapest. Hungary
- Doors. State Russian Museum. Saint Petersburg
- BW. Museum of Contemporary Art PERMM. Perm
- 10th anniversary of the Gallery. Marina Gisich Gallery. Saint Petersburg

2010

- After the trouble. Museum Center "Place of Peace". Krasnoyarsk
- Kandinsky Prize for Contemporary Art 2010. Exhibition of nominees. Central House of Artists. Moscow
- Duel. RuArts Gallery. Moscow
- Open Day: mansion - gymnasium - clinic - museum. Moscow Museum of Modern Art. Moscow
- BW. Gallery Modernariat. Saint Petersburg
- Always different art. Collection of Victor Bondarenko. Moscow Museum of Modern Art. Moscow

2009

- Russian beauty. ABOUT ARTE. Saint Petersburg
- New sculpture: chaos and structure. State Gallery on Solyanka. Moscow
- The Russians. Ober Gallery. Kent. USA
- Art about art. State Russian Museum. Saint Petersburg
- Silence. Factory "Red Banner". Saint Petersburg
- Show Me and Him. Calvert 22. London. Great Britain
- Recycling. State Hermitage Museum. Saint Petersburg
- Landscape. RuArts Gallery. Moscow
- Dal. 8th Krasnoyarsk Museum Biennale. Krasnoyarsk Museum Center. Krasnoyarsk

2008

- Boris Iofan and New Babylon. Gallery "Atelier No. 2". Moscow

2007

- Space era. Central Museum of Communications named after. A. S. Popova. Saint Petersburg
- Art of the 20th century in St. Petersburg. Central Exhibition Hall "Manege". Saint Petersburg
- Something about power. 2nd Moscow Biennale of Contemporary Art. National Center for Contemporary Art. Moscow
- I don't need a map. Anna Akhmatova Museum. Saint Petersburg
- New Angelarium. Moscow Museum of Modern Art. Moscow

2006

- Space I. Eastern Gallery. Moscow
- Space I. Belka & Strelka Project. Saint Petersburg
- Russia Fly By. Hungart-7. Salzburg. Austria
- New Russian Avant-Garde. Exhibition Hall BurdaYukom. Munich. Germany
- Circle III. Belka & Strelka Project. Saint Petersburg

2005

- Steps. Jawaharlal Nehru University. New Delhi. India
- Nimbus for the House. Kuhmalahti. Tampere. Finland
- Light I. Belka & Strelka Project. Saint Petersburg
- In memory of Newton. National Center for Contemporary Art. Saint Petersburg
- I click, therefore I exist. M'ARS Center for Contemporary Art. Moscow
- Human Project. St. Petersburg. 1st Moscow Biennale of Contemporary Art. Central House of Artists. Moscow
- He was tall... 100 years since the birth of Daniil Kharms. State Russian Museum. Saint Petersburg
- Portrait of a face. Gallery of Marat Gelman. Moscow
- Collage in Russia. 20th century. State Russian Museum. Saint Petersburg

2004

- Emperor Paul I: the current image of the past. State Russian Museum. Saint Petersburg
- Stairway to Heaven. Art-Klyazma. Moscow
- Silence. Novosibirsk State Art Museum. Novosibirsk
- NA KURORT. Kunsthalle. Baben-Baden. Germany
- Mimicry. Village of artists. Saint Petersburg

2003

- Touch Me. Anna Akhmatova Museum. Saint Petersburg
- The space of a picture is the space of reality. Anna Akhmatova Museum. Saint Petersburg
- Digital - Analog. New countdown. Gallery of Marat Gelman. Central House of Artists. Moscow

2002

- Russian Artists. Gallery Garden. Grindstead. Denmark
- Project Living Architecture. Park of culture and recreation. Anna Akhmatova Museum. Saint Petersburg
- Lost Heroes. ARTGenda. Hamburg. Germany

2001

- MIR-PEACE. Gallery "Borey". Saint Petersburg
- Re: MIR-PEACE. Art Agents Gallery. Hamburg. Germany
- MEDIA-PRIVET. State Russian Museum. Saint Petersburg
- Demobilization album. Anna Akhmatova Museum. Saint Petersburg

2000

- Art Festival of St. Petersburg. Musikhouset. Esberg. Denmark

1999

- 4th International Graphic Biennale. Novosibirsk State Art Museum. Novosibirsk
- The Art of Still Life. State Russian Museum. Saint Petersburg

1998

- Myths and Legends. State Russian Museum. Saint Petersburg

1997

- Cultural landscape of Kaliningrad. Kaliningrad State Art Gallery. Kaliningrad
- A Window to the Holland. Amsterdam. Holland

1996

- 4th International Graphic Biennale. Kaliningrad State Art Gallery. Kaliningrad
