= Mikhalevo, Savinsky District, Ivanovo Oblast =

Mikhalevo Михалёво
- Village
- Location within Ivanovo Oblast Location within Russia
- Coordinates: 56°38′N 41°37′E
- Country: Russia
- Region: Ivanovo Oblast
- District: Savinsky District
- Time zone: UTC+3:00

Church of St. John the Evangelist (Ivanovo Region, Savinsky District, Mikhalevo Village)

Mikhalevo (Russian: Михалёво) is a rural locality (a selo) in Savinsky District, Ivanovo Oblast, Russia. Population: 49 (2010 census);

== Geography ==
This rural locality is located 25 kilometres (16 mi) from Savino (the district's administrative centre), 56 kilometres (35 mi) from Ivanovo (capital of Ivanovo Oblast) and 264 kilometres (164 mi) from Moscow. Gremyachevo is the nearest rural locality.
