= Mikhalevo, Muromsky District, Vladimir Oblast =

Mikhalevo Михалёво
- Village
- Location within Vladimir Oblast Location within Russia
- Coordinates: 55°40′N 41°52′E
- Country: Russia
- Region: Vladimir Oblast
- District: Muromsky District
- Time zone: UTC+3:00

Mikhalevo (Russian: Михалёво) is a rural locality (a village) in Kovarditskoye Rural Settlement, Muromsky District, Vladimir Oblast, Russia. The population was 160 as of 2010. There are 5 streets.

== Geography ==
Mikhalevo is located 21 km northwest of Murom (the district's administrative centre) by road. Savkovo is the nearest rural locality.
