= Vadim Zakharov =

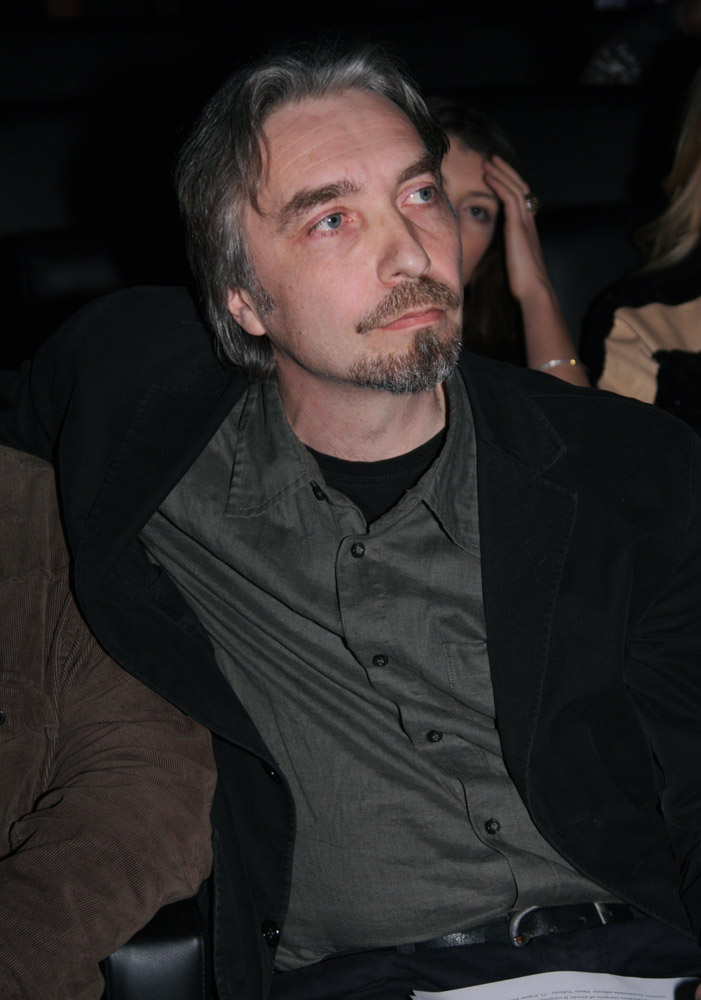
Vadim Zakharov

Vadim Zakharov (Russian: Вадим Арисович Захаров; born 1959 in Dushanbe, Tajikistan) is an internationally exhibited Russian conceptual artist living and working in Moscow and Cologne, Germany.

He created the work for the Russian pavilion at the 2013 55th edition of the Venice Biennale. His installation therein marked the first time an artist's work occupied both levels of the structure. Zahkarov is a graduate of the Moscow State Teachers Training Institute.
