= Mikhalevo (Golovinskoye Rural Settlement), Sudogodsky District, Vladimir Oblast =

Mikhalevo Михалёво
- Village
- Location within Vladimir Oblast Location within Russia
- Coordinates: 55°58′N 40°26′E
- Country: Russia
- Region: Vladimir Oblast
- District: Sudogodsky District
- Time zone: UTC+3:00

Mikhalevo (Russian: Михалёво) is a rural locality (a village) in Golovinskoye Rural Settlement, Sudogodsky District, Vladimir Oblast, Russia. The population was 3 as of 2010.

== Geography ==
It is located 2 km north from Golovino, 30 km west from Sudogda.
