= Mikhalevo, Kharovsky District, Vologda Oblast =

Mikhalevo Михалево
- Village
- Location within Vologda Oblast Location within Russia
- Coordinates: 60°00′N 39°58′E
- Country: Russia
- Region: Vologda Oblast
- District: Kharovsky District
- Time zone: UTC+3:00

Mikhalevo (Russian: Михалево) is a rural locality (a village) in Kubenskoye Rural Settlement, Kharovsky District, Vologda Oblast, Russia. The population was 14 as of 2002.

== Geography ==
Mikhalevo is located 23 km northwest of Kharovsk (the district's administrative centre) by road. Gora is the nearest rural locality.
