= Mikhalevo, Privolzhsky District, Ivanovo Oblast =

Mikhalevo Михалево
- Village
- Location within Ivanovo Oblast Location within Russia
- Coordinates: 57°11′N 41°23′E
- Country: Russia
- Region: Ivanovo Oblast
- District: Privolzhsky District
- Time zone: UTC+3:00

Mikhalevo (Russian: Михалево) is a rural locality (a village) in Privolzhsky District, Ivanovo Oblast, Russia. Population: 6 (2010 census);

== Geography ==
This rural locality is located 21 kilometres (13 mi) from Privolzhsk (the district's administrative centre), 34 kilometres (21 mi) from Ivanovo (capital of Ivanovo Oblast) and 278 kilometres (173 mi) from Moscow. Kuznechikha is the nearest rural locality.
