= Mikhalevo, Ivanovsky District, Ivanovo Oblast =

Mikhalevo Михалево
- Selo
- Location within Ivanovo Oblast Location within Russia
- Coordinates: 56°59′N 40°46′E
- Country: Russia
- Region: Ivanovo Oblast
- District: Ivanovsky District
- Time zone: UTC+3:00

Mikhalevo (Russian: Михалево) is a rural locality (a selo) in Ivanovsky District, Ivanovo Oblast, Russia. Population: 1,625 (2010 census);

== Geography ==
This rural locality is located 11 km from Ivanovo (the district's administrative centre and capital of Ivanovo Oblast) and 235 km from Moscow. Kuminovo is the nearest rural locality.
