= Mikhalevo (Lavrovskoye Rural Settlement), Sudogodsky District, Vladimir Oblast =

Mikhalevo Михалёво
- Village
- Location within Vladimir Oblast Location within Russia
- Coordinates: 56°04′N 40°48′E
- Country: Russia
- Region: Vladimir Oblast
- District: Sudogodsky District
- Time zone: UTC+3:00

Mikhalevo (Russian: Михалёво) is a rural locality (a village) in Lavrovskoye Rural Settlement, Sudogodsky District, Vladimir Oblast, Russia. The population was 20 as of 2010.

== Geography ==
It is located on the Sudogda River, 11 km (6.8 mi) north from Lavrovo, 14 km (8.7 mi) north from Sudogda.
