= Mikhail Roginsky =

Russian painter

Mikhail Roginsky (Russian: Михаил Рогинский; 14 August 1931 – 5 July 2004) was a Russian painter. Roginsky was one of the leaders of Soviet Nonconformist Art and the creator of the modern national visual method, with its laconic means and inner expressiveness.

== Biography ==
In 1978, Roginsky moved to Paris. One year before his emigration he had gone back to documentary art and did a series of five or six works with cans. "I felt (he explained) that I had to go back to what I had begun with, to return to myself". He left Russia shortly after he had finished that series. Roginsky answer to the question whether the West had any influence on him, was brief: "Sure". But he could not say exactly what. "Everything, (he believes) a different life, a different atmosphere, a different reality. I am generally very much influenced by where I live, what I see around me, what kind of art I behold and the type of people I rub shoulders with'".

He died on 5 July 2004 in Paris.
