= Natalia Duritskaya =

Russian painter

Natalia Ivanovna Duritskaya
- Наталья Ивановна Дурицкая
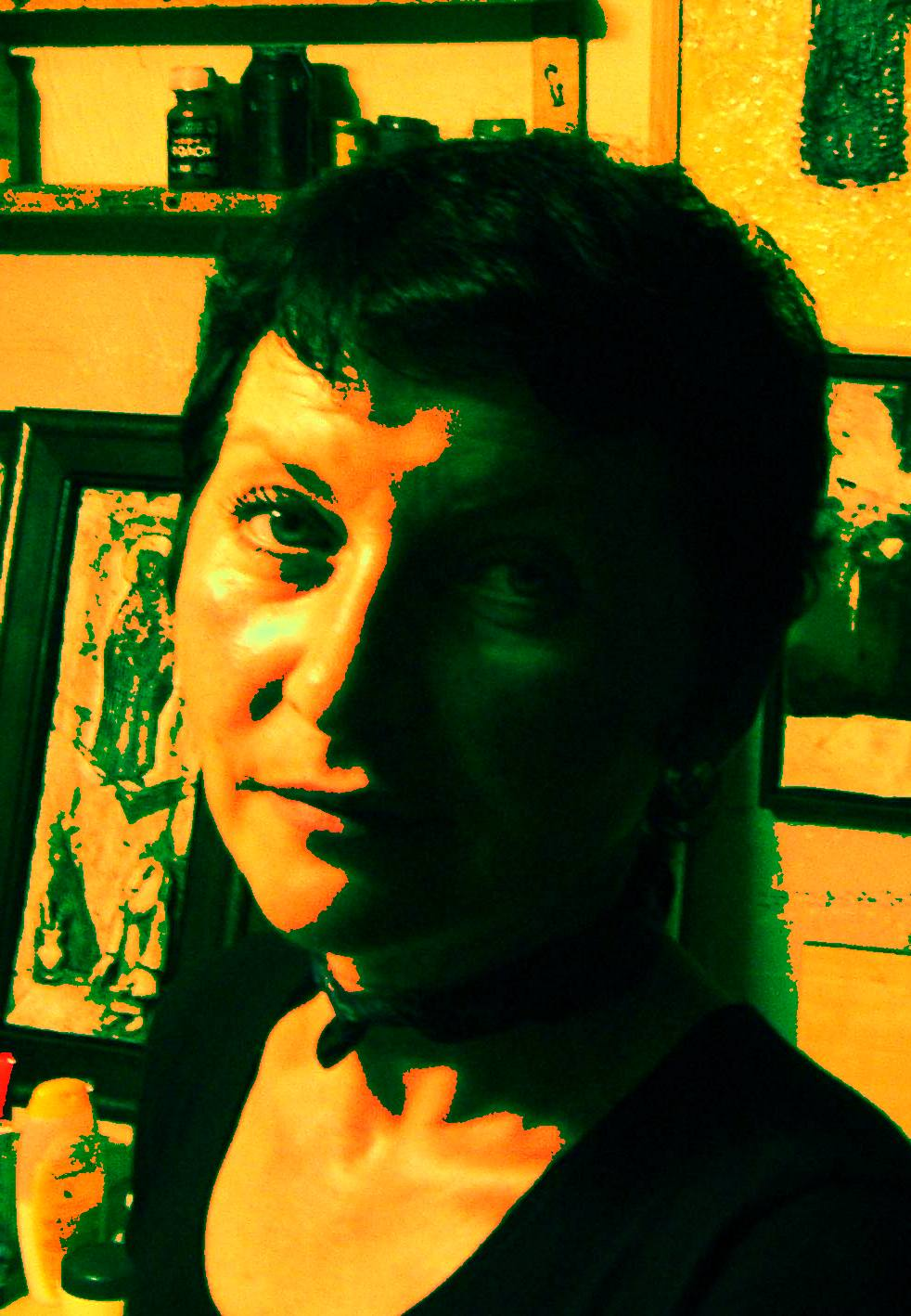
- Duritskaya in 2004
- Born: July 16, 1960 (age 53); Taganrog, Russian SFSR, Soviet Union
- Education: M.B. Grekov Rostov artistic school
- Known for: Painting, drawing

Natalia Duritskaya (Russian: Наталья Ивановна Дурицкая, July 16, 1960, Taganrog) is a Russian painter and a member of the Union of Artists of Russia.

== Biography ==
Duritskaya was born in Taganrog on 16 July 1960, and was a student of Leonid Stukanov and Yuri Fesenko. From 1978 to 1982 she studied at the M.B. Grekov Rostov artistic school in (Yuri Fesenko's workshop), Rostov-on-Don. She worked as a layout artist in the Rostov artistic production combine of the Union of Artists (1982–1995, Taganrog). In 1987 she participated in the “One-day exhibition” of the future “Iskustvo ili smert’” (Art or death) company that became famous among art critics (Taganrog, DK the “Priboi” plant). From 1996 until 1999, she taught at the Children's artistic school (drawing, painting, history of arts). Since 2005, she is an instructor at the Rostov School of Arts No. 1 (drawing, painting, composition). Since 1999, she lives and works in Rostov-on-Don.

== N. Duritskoj's works are in collections ==
- ART4.RU Contemporary Art Museum, Moscow.
- Музей современного изобразительного искусства на Дмитровской, Rostov-on-Don.
- Краснодарский краевой художественный музей имени Ф. А. Коваленко, Krasnodar.
- Taganrog Art Museum, Taganrog.
- Дом-музей Максимилиана Волошина, Koktebel.
- Волгодонский художественный музей|Volgodonsk Art Museum, Volgodonsk.
- Gallery «Piter», Taganrog.
- Токарев, Александр Павлович, Starocherkasskaya.
- Private collections in Switzerland, Germany, United States, Israel, Russia.

== Personal exhibitions ==
- 2010 – «ВиноВатаЯ». Галерея «Вата», Ростов-на-Дону.
- 2010 – «Здесь был Вова» (совм. с С. Сапожниковым). Галерея «Вата», Ростов-на-Дону.
- 2010 – «Малярка». МСИИД, Выставочный зал ТЦГПБ им. А. П. Чехова, Таганрог.
- 2008 – «Midnight Alarm». Club “Old grand piano”, Volgodonsk;
- 2008 – «Vetvi» (Branches). Taganrog Art Museum, Taganrog;
- 2006 – «Prosto» (Simple). Museum of town building and lifestyle, Taganrog;
- 2004 – «Natasha De». Apartment exhibition, Rostov-on-Don;
- 2000 – «Rost'ov». Apartment exhibition, Rostov-on-Don;
- 1995 – «Tikhaya zhizn’ mertvoi natury» («The quiet life of dead nature»). DHS showroom, Taganrog.

== Gallery ==
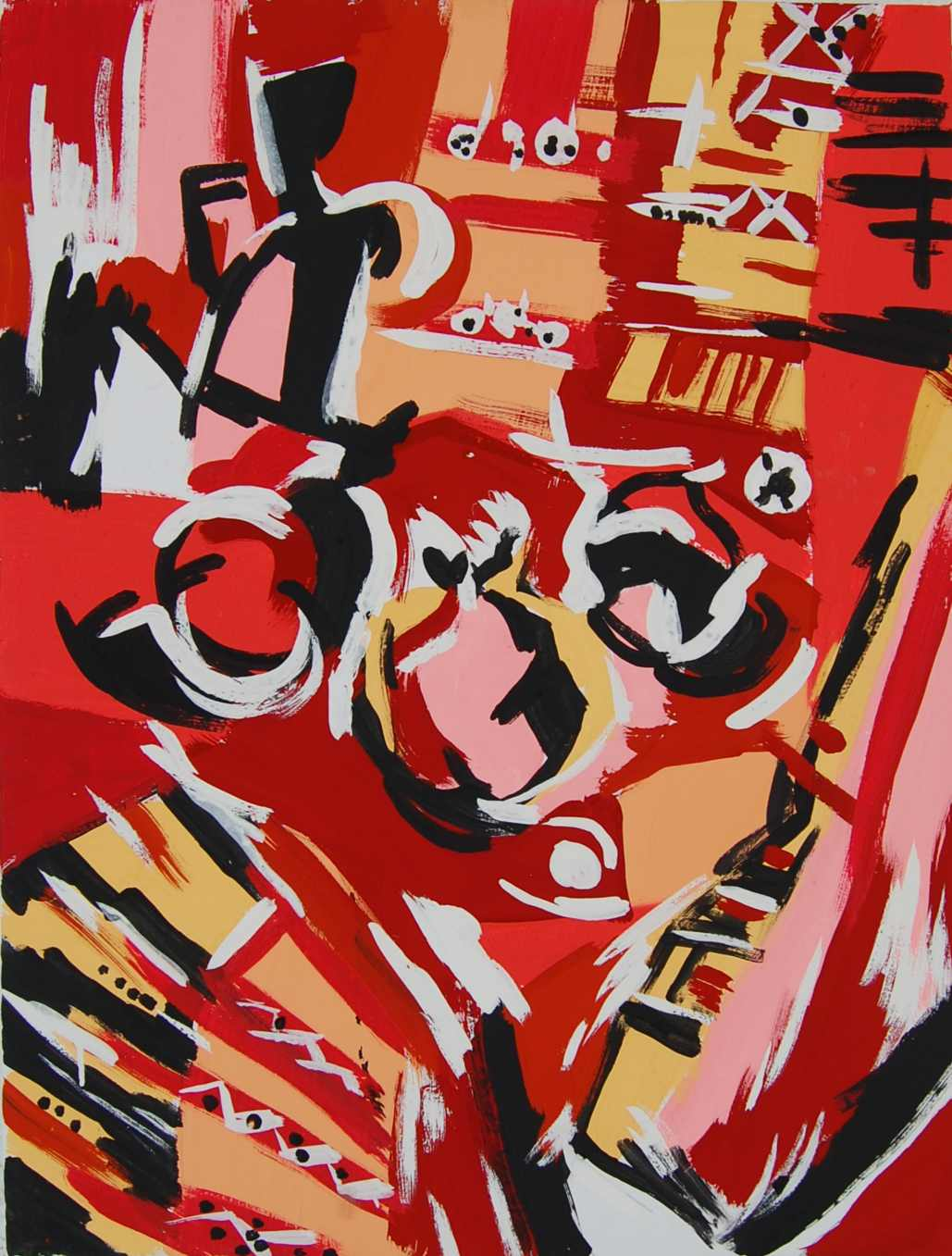
"Dreams of Grandmother Sarah", Paper/gouache, 68,5х52,5, 2008

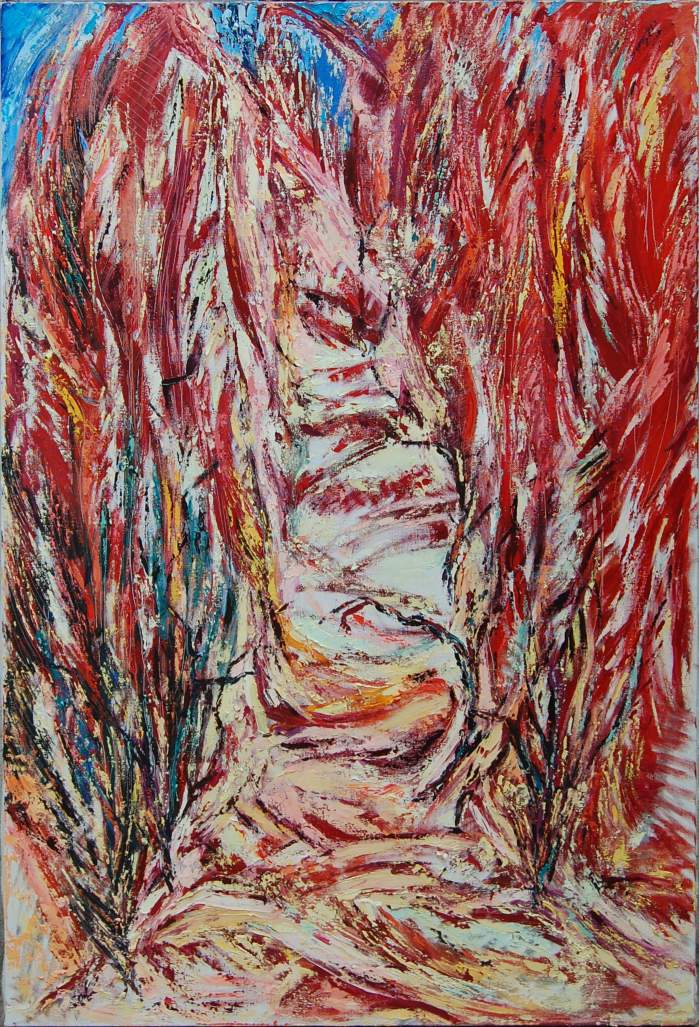
"Sutin's avenue", Canvas/oil, 140x95, 2008

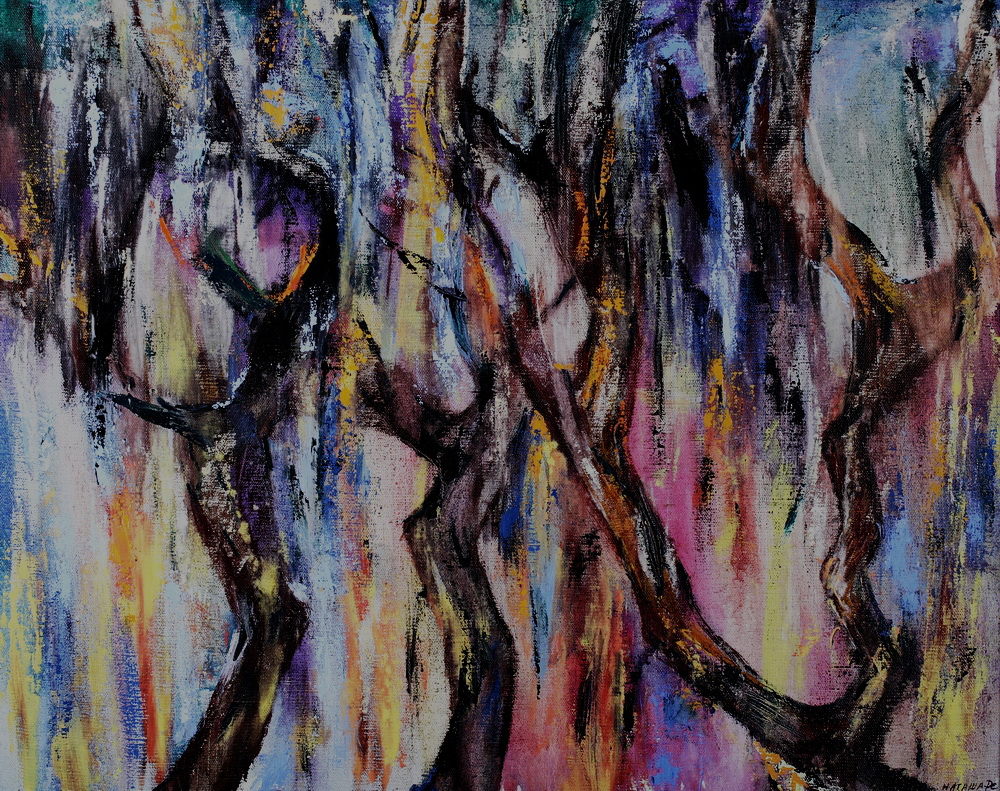
"Kapel' dojdya, pobejavshih vosled...", Canvas/oil, 64x81, 2007

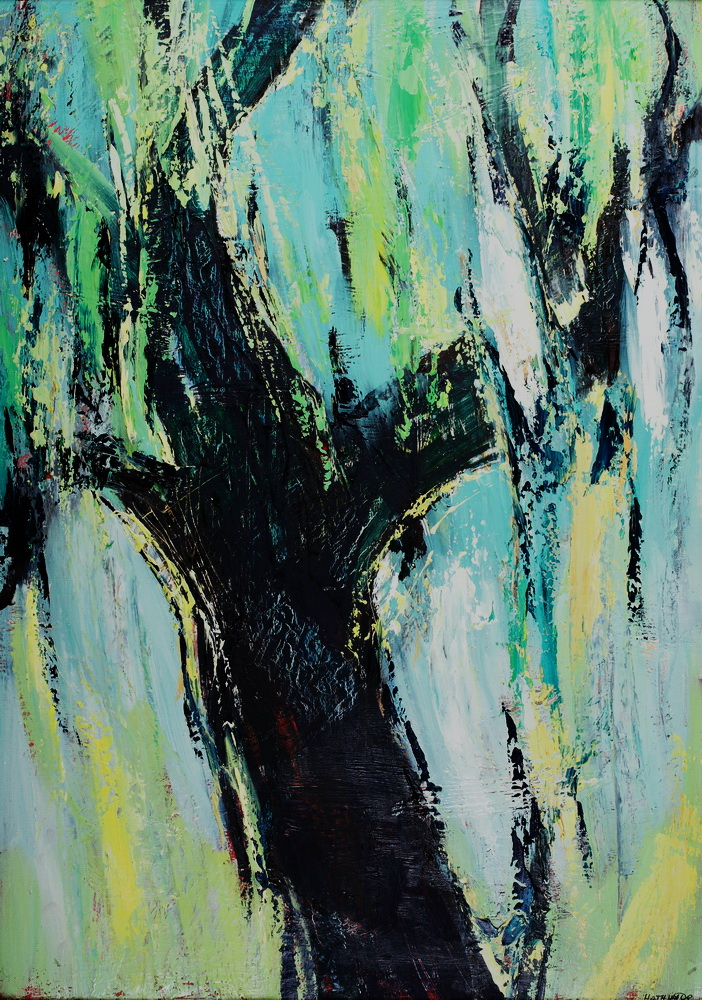
"Chernoe derevo", Cardboard/oil, 100x70, 2007

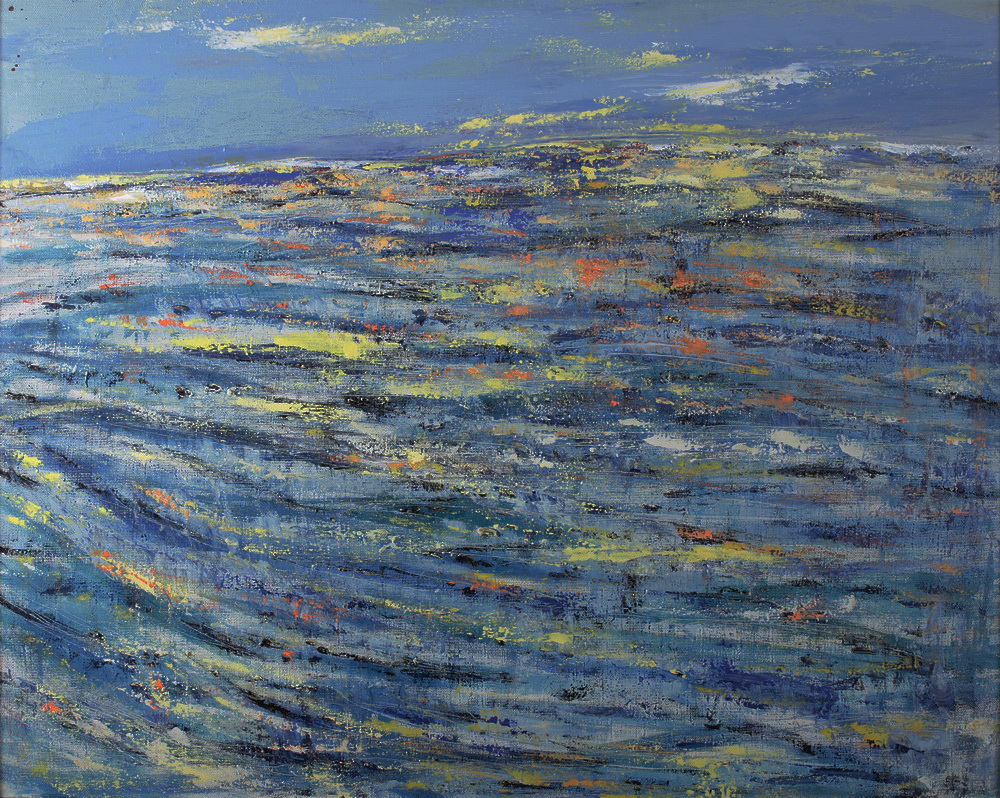
"Gulf of Taganrog", Canvas/oil, 81x102, 2006

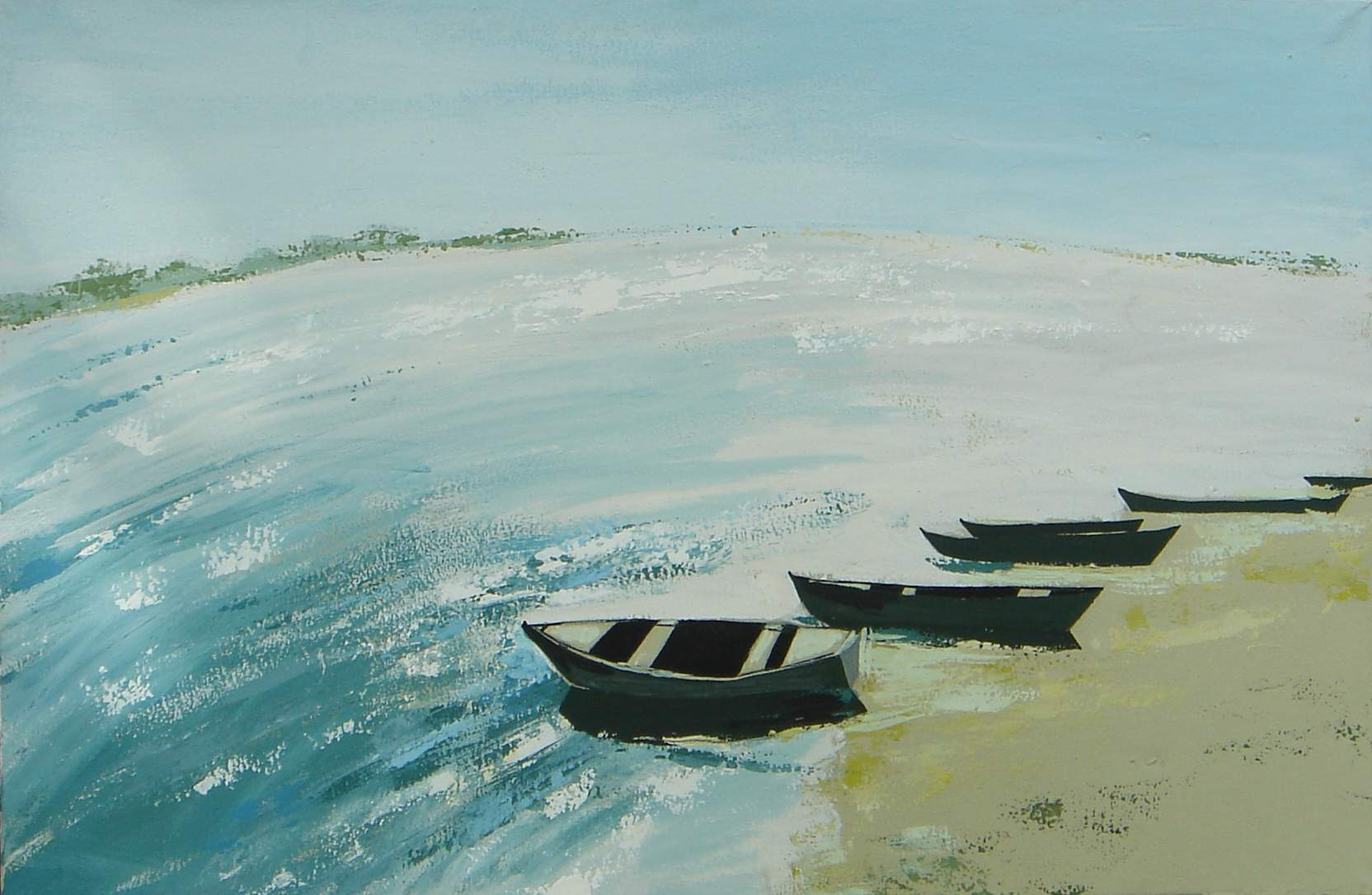
"I reki, svetlue kak nebesa...", Paper/gouache, 65x96, 2006

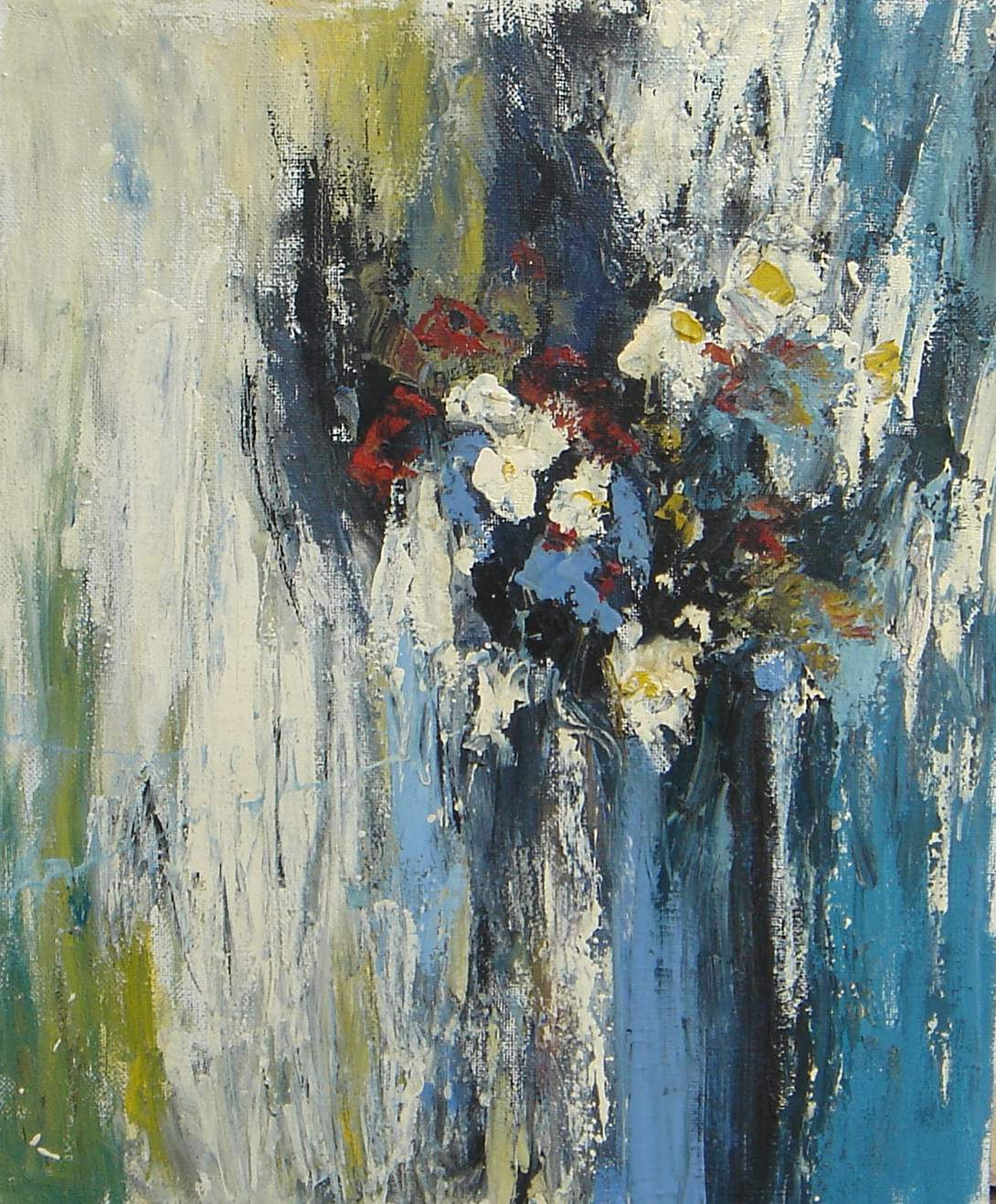
"Blue vase", Canvas/oil, 57x47, 2003

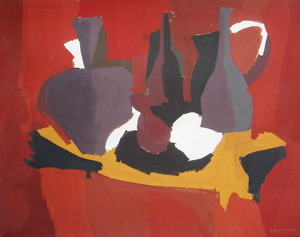
Мне другие мерещатся тени, 1995

== Sources ==
1. Halperin V. Vetvi Pamyati (Branches of memory) // Molot. — 2008. — 1 February.
2. Vladimirova M. A ty kakoe derevo (What tree are you?) // Taganrogskaya pravda. — 2008. — 19 January
3. Shabelnikov Yu. Duritskaya // Novaya taganrogskaya gazeta. — 2006. — 2 December
4. Vystavka ROSSIYA (Exhibition RUSSIA) // Taganrogskaya pravda. — 2004. — 29 January
5. Encyclopedia of Taganrog. — Taganrog: Anton, 1998. — 624 p. — ISBN 5-88040-017-4.
6. Voskovskaya T. Zhizn’ stilya ili styl’ zhizni? (The life of style or the style of life?) // Gorod. — 1995. — № 44.
7. Pertsov A. Natalia Duritskaya // Catalog of the “Tikhaya zhizn’ mertvoi natury" (The quiet life of dead nature) exhibition. — 1995.
