= Vladimir Dubossarsky =

Russian painter working in pop art genre

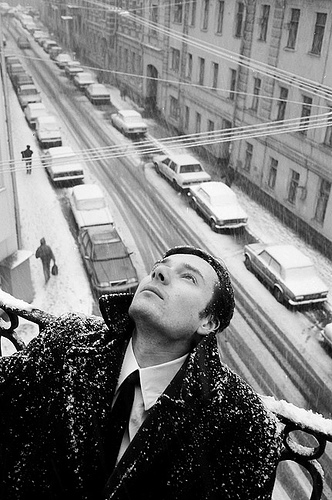
Vladimir Dubossarsky

Vladimir Efimovich Dubossarsky (Russian: Владимир Ефимович Дубосарский; born 1964) is a Russian painter working in pop art genre.

Since 1994 he performs in an art duet with Alexander Vinogradov. Both live and work in Moscow, Russia. In the early part of their career together they adopted the style of socialist realism, an officially sanctioned art practice under the soviet regime. Their early works resembled posters for non-existent thrillers and sleazy porn flicks. They worked with their idea of social order, laborers, collective farmers, etc. and put a modern twist on an outdated practice. Their result was a collection of ideas and themes that would make socialistic fantasies visible to the viewer.

In 2001, Dubosarsky and Vinogradov made a transition from the socialist fantasy to the ideals of mass media. Total Painting (2001) created a large scale image of mass culture from around the world borrowing ideas from advertising and mainstream media. Our Best World (2003) created a common ground for stars such as Sylvester Stallone, Spider-Man, Barbie, Madonna, Arnold Schwarzenegger, Marilyn Monroe, and even Picasso. The Underwater World (2002) was made for the Russian pavilion for the 50th Venice Biennale. The piece references ideas gathered from pop images such as mail order catalogs, and heroes in contemporary advertising.

== Solo exhibitions ==
2016

- Sweeter than sugar, Louise Alexander Gallery, Porto Cervo, Italy
- FB shows and tells, Moscow Manege, Russia

2008

- The New People Are Already Here. Deitch Projects, New York, USA
- Meander. Resort Pirogovo, Moscow Region, Russia
- Untitled. Vilma Gold Gallery, London, UK

2007

- In the Artist's Studio. Gallery Orel Art, Paris, France
- The Russian Painting Seasons. The State Tretyakov Gallery, Moscow, Russia

2006

- Anthills. XL Gallery. Moscow, Russia
- The Lightness of Being. Resort Pirogovo, Moscow Region, Russia
- Underwater Barber. Paperworks Gallery, Moscow, Russia

2005

- Untitled. Charlotte Moser Gallery, Geneva, Switzerland
- New Painting. XL Gallery, Moscow, Russia
- 9 Nudes Series. Gallery Orel Art, Paris, France
- Graphic Works of Different Years. Paperworks Gallery, Moscow, Russia

2004

- Aquafitness. Vilma Gold Gallery, London, UK

2003

- Our Best World. Deitch Projects, New York, USA
- Astrakhan Blues. XL Gallery, Moscow, Russia
- Raining. Gallery Krinzinger, Viennа, Austria
- Underwater Forever. Gallery Orel Art, Paris, France

2002

- Total Painting. XL Gallery, Moscow, Russia
- Painting for Finland. MUU Gallery, Helsinki, Finland
- Untitled. Vilma Gold Gallery, London, UK

2001

- How Are You, Ladies and Gentlemen? Gallery Claudio Poleschi, Lucca, Italy
- Picture for London. Vilma Gold Gallery, London, UK
- Sweet Girls. Moscow Fine Art Gallery, Moscow, Russia

2000

- Inspiration. XL Gallery, Moscow, Russia
- Flying Crans. Moscow Fine Art Gallery, Moscow, Russia

1999

- Christ in Moscow. XL Gallery, Moscow, Russia
- Just Pictures. Moscow Fine Art Gallery, Moscow, Russia

1998

- P.S. Guelman Gallery, Moscow, Russia

1997

- Erntedankfest. Atelier-Ester Freund, Vienna, Austria
- Austrian and Russian Literature. Brasilica, Viennа, Austria
- Etudes. L-Gallery, Moscow, Russia

1996

- Russian Literature. Guelman Gallery, Moscow, Russia
- Triumph. Guelman Gallery, Moscow, Russia
- Bluhende Landschaften. Gallery Kai Higelman, Berlin, Germany
- Project for Russian Playboy. Moscow Fine Art Gallery, Moscow, Russia

1995

- A Picture for the Reichstag. Gallery Kai Hilgemann, Berlin, Germany
- Paintings Made to Order. L- Gallery, Moscow, Russia

1994

- Picasso in Moscow. Studio 20 Gallery, Moscow, Russia

== Group exhibitions ==
2008

- Thaw, Russian Art from Glasnost to the Present, Chelsea Art Museum, New York, USA
- Exhibition of the Musée National de l'Art Moderne du Centre Pompidou, Seoul Museum of Art, Seoul, Korea
- Russian Dreams. Art Basel Miami Beach, Miami, USA
- ART-index. The Latvian National Museum of Art, Arsenal, Riga, Latvia

2007

- I Believe. Winzavod, Moscow, Russia
- New Exposition. The State Tretyakov Gallery, Moscow, Russia
- Sots Art, Political Art in Russia from 1972 to Today. The State Tretyakov Gallery, Moscow, Russia; La Maison Rouge, Paris, France

2006

- Russia! Solomon R. Guggenheim Museum, Bilbao, Spain

2005

- StarZ. Museum of Modern Art, Moscow, Russia
- Angels of History. MUHKA, Antwerpen, Belgium
- Russian Pop Art. The State Tretyakov Gallery, Moscow, Russia
- Russia! Solomon R. Guggenheim Museum, New York, USA

2004

- Berlin-Moscow, 1950-2000. Martin Gropius Bau, Berlin, Germany; The State Historical museum, Moscow, Russia
- OOopsa! Contemporary Russian Art. National Museum of Contemporary Art, Oslo, Norway
- Expander. Royal Academy of Arts, London, UK

2003

- Returning of the Artist. 50th Venice Biennale, Russian pavilion, Venice, Italy
- Moscow - Berlin, Berlin – Moscow. Berliner Gropius-Bau, Berlin, Germany

2002

- Urgent Painting. Musee d'Art Modern de la Ville de Paris, Paris, France
- Davai - Russian Art Now. Aus dem Laboratorium der Freien Kunste in Russland, Berlin, Germany; MAK, Vienna, Austria
- São Paulo Biennale. São Paulo, Brazil

2001

- Made in Italy. Palazzo della Triennale, Milan, Italy
- Russian Madness. Biennale Valencia, Spain
- Players. Watermill Center of Robert Wilson, New York, USA
- Russian Artists in Vienna. Schloss Grafenegg, Vienna, Austria
- Escape, 2nd Tirana Biennale, Albania

2000

- I Hate You in June. Museum of Art Ein Harod, Israel
- In & Out. 1st Tirana Biennale, Albania
- Guelman's Collection. State Russian Museum, St Petersburg
- Fuori Uso 2000. The Bridges. Pescara, Italy

1997

- 3rd Biennial of Contemporary Art. Cetine, Monte Negro
- It's a Better World. Secession, Vienna, Austria

1995

- Kunst im Verborgenen. Nonkonformisten Russland 1957-1995. Wilhelm-Hack Museum, Ludwigshaven; Documenta, Kassel; Staatliches Lindenau Museum, Altenburg, Germany
- Zeigenössische Kunst aus Russland. Daimler-Benz Aerospace, München, Germany
- INTERREGNUM. Kunsthalle Nurnberg, Nurnberg, Germany

1994

- Fluchtpunkt Moskau", Forum Ludwig, Aachen, Germany
- 2nd Biennial of Contemporary Art. Cetine, Monte Negro

== Selected Collections ==
- Art4.ru Contemporary Art Museum, Moscow, Russia
- Bonn Historical Museum, Bonn, Germany
- Centre Pompidou, Paris, France
- Cultural Foundation “EKATERINA”, Moscow, Russia
- Cultural Foundation “New”, Moscow, Russia
- Duke University Museum of Art, Durham, USA
- Houston Museum of Contemporary Art, Houston, USA
- Ivanovo Museum, Ivanovo, Russia
- MACI Museo Arte Contemporanea Isernia, Italy
- Moscow House of Photography, Moscow, Russia
- Museum Of Contemporary Art, Avignon, France
- Museum of Contemporary Art of Valencia, Spain
- New Rules Foundation, Moscow, Russia
- Scheringa Museum voor Realisme, Spanbroek, Netherlands
- Secession, Vienna, Austria
- Yaroslavl Museum, Yaroslavl, Russia

== External references ==
- Dubossarsky's biography
- Vladimir Dubossarsky "Sweeter than sugar" at Louise Alexander Gallery
- http://www.galerie-krinzinger.at/kuenstler/dubvino/dubvino_bi_fr.html
