= Second Russian avant-garde =

Russian fine arts and poetry movement (1950s–1980s)

The second Russian avant-garde (Russian: Вторая волна русского авангарда) was a movement in Russian art, primarily in fine arts and poetry, which began in the mid-1950s and ended in the late 1980s. The movement's birth is associated with the Khrushchev Thaw and with the 6th World Festival of Youth and Students in 1957 in Moscow. The concept was introduced into cultural circulation by Mikhail Grobman during his visit to the Tel Aviv Art Museum in the late 1950s, and by the late 1980s the term had become a solidified historical movement.

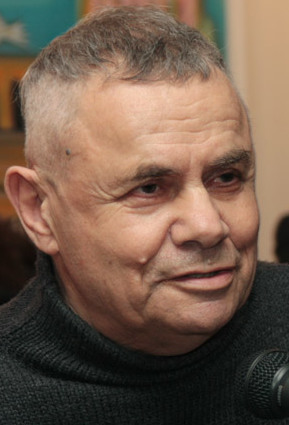
Picture of Mikhail Grobman ca. 2013

== History ==
As part of the 6th International Festival of Youth and Students held in 1957, an art exhibition was held, at which visitors were invited to get acquainted with the works of contemporary artists from 52 countries around the world. Thus, for Russian artists, it was a chance to open the Iron Curtain and look at what is being said in the world of culture and art abroad. This exhibition made a deep impression on many, giving impetus to the development of new styles of art in the Soviet Union. This new, often unofficial art due to the artist's chosen style and ideological position, according to the account of Mikhail Grobman, was the beginning of "the second Russian avant-garde" or "the second wave of Russian avant-garde" following the first "wave" during the late 1890s to the 1930s.

According to the art critic Lelya Kantor-Kazovskaya, in the late 1950s the Museum of Modern Art in New York began to expand alongside the creation of the Congress for Cultural Freedom, sponsored by the US Government and the CIA, to combat the Cold War from a cultural angle and the spread of communist ideology. In 1959, the American National Exhibition was held in Moscow.

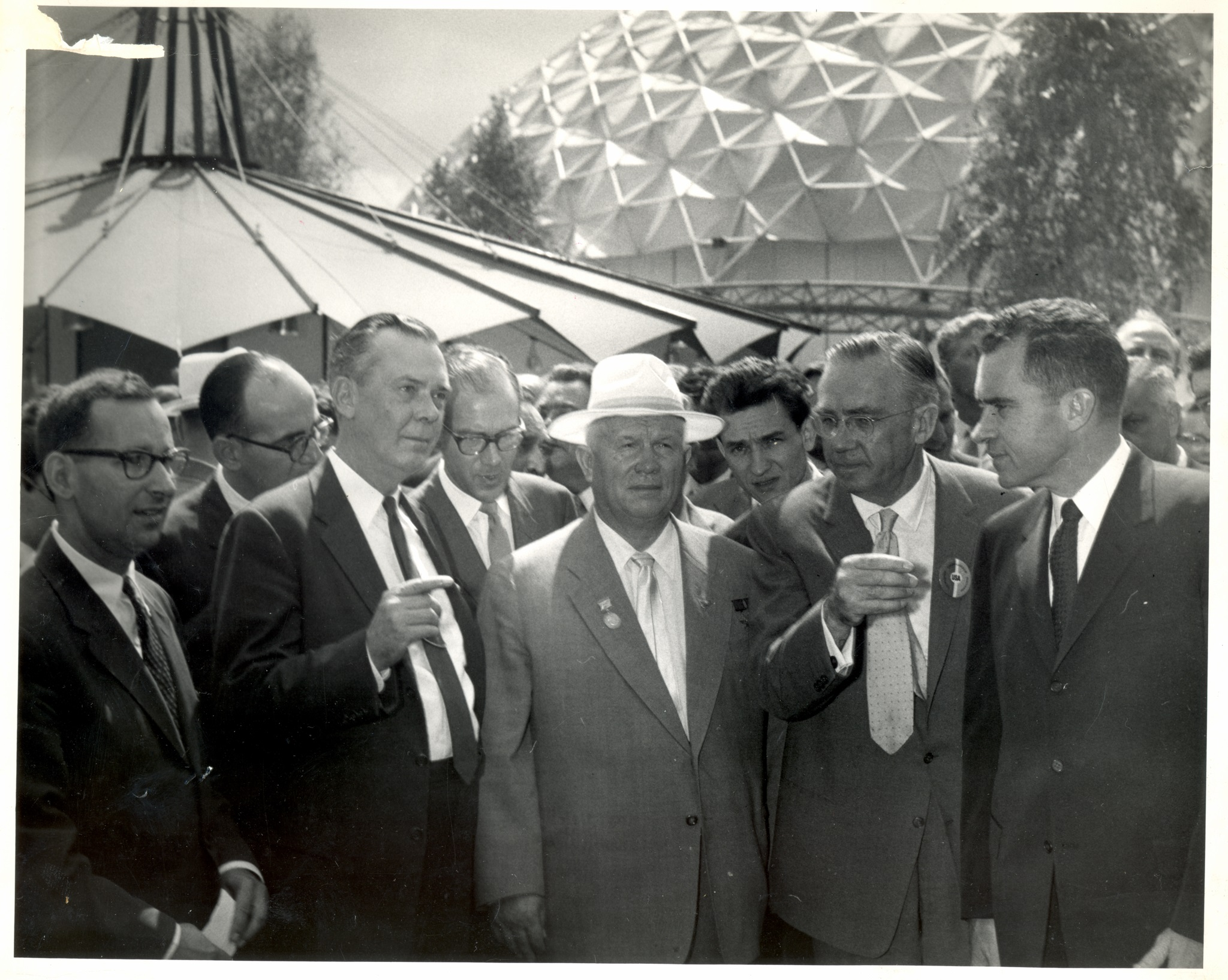
Vice President Richard Nixon and Soviet Premier Nikita Krushchev tour the U.S. National Exhibition in Sokolniki Park, Moscow, July 1959.

The period from the late 50s to the early 60s in the Soviet Union was marked by an expansion of innovation and creation in all spheres of Russian cultural life. Thanks to the Khrushchev Thaw, previously censored creative ideas and movements were allowed to finally openly express themselves. In 1954, the artist Ely Belyutin created the "New Reality" art studio. Belyutin developed a special methodology based on different teaching systems, including the method created by Russian painter Pavel Petrovich Chistyakov which focused on analyzing and taking into account the fine details of one's subject as well as the Russian avant-garde artists of the 1920s and their movements of Constructivism and Suprematism.

However, the period of the "Thaw" did not last forever, nor did the freedoms it allowed. In 1962, at the art exhibition "30 Years of the Moscow Artists' Union" held in Manezh Khrushchev, after having observed the works of Belyutin's New Reality studio, declared that in matters of art he remained a Stalinist in his ideology and philosophical point of view. He saw Belyutin's works as polluting the ideals of Socialist Realism with highly sexual and provocative imagery. The event is historically called the Manege Affair, and marked a return in state control over the development of Soviet cultural production. The consequences of this affair by Khrushchev had widespread ramifications within \the Union, and the previous condemnation of the movements of Formalism and Abstractionism were intensified. However, during the period of the 1970s to 1990s, the notion of "unofficial art" and the "unofficial artist" didn't have one exact conception. Yet, ten years prior during the 1950s and 60s it was slightly more clear as the Khrushchev That had opened up the ability to publicly question the Socialist ideology, although within tightly codified boundaries.

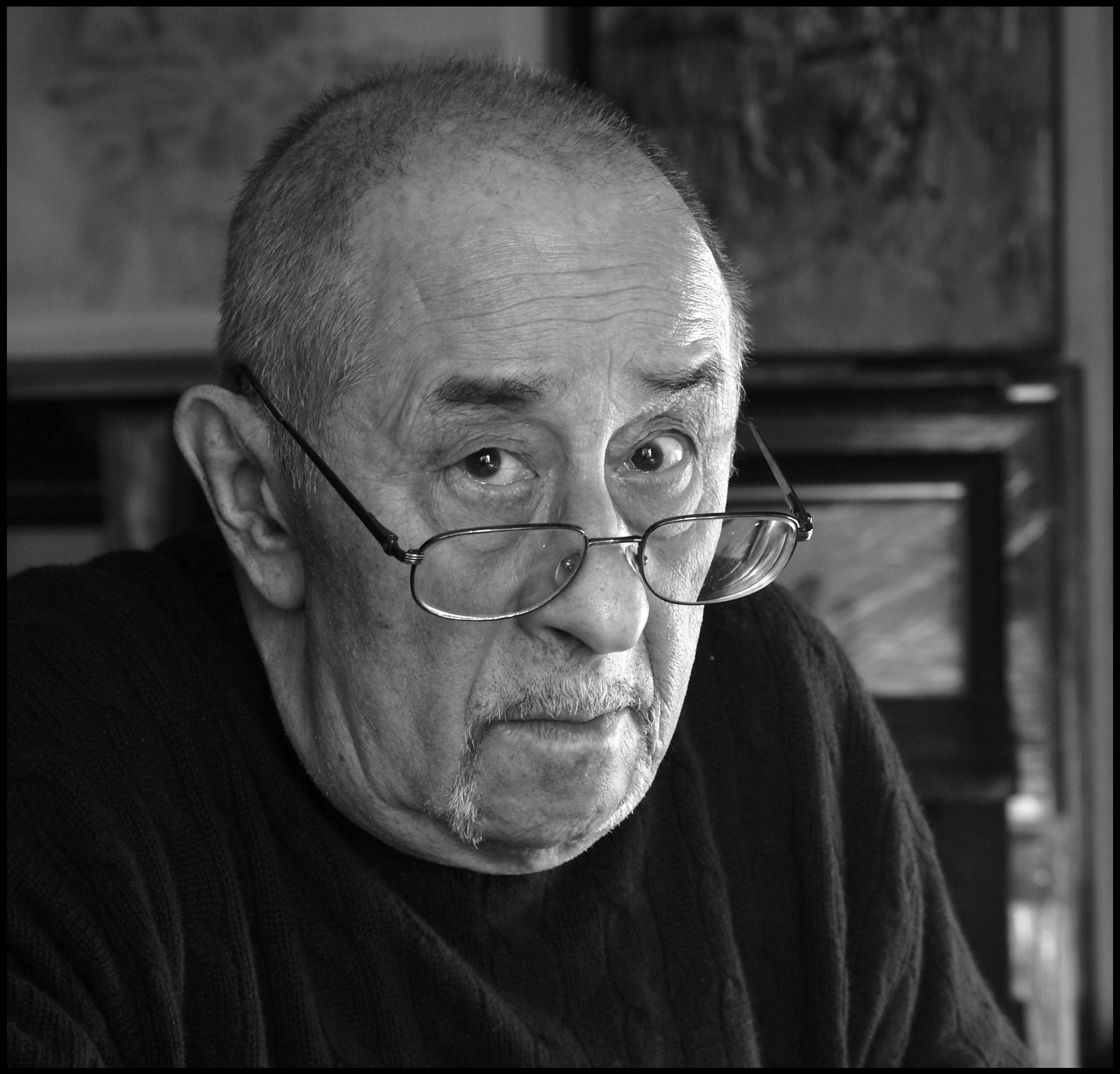
Picture of Boris Zhutovsky

== Artists ==
Despite the lack of state support, and sometimes persecution from the authorities, artists continued to develop their craft. Grobman's list of "Second Avant-Garde" artists include 35 artists. Among them:

=== 1950s–1970s ===
- Nikolai Andronov
- Ely Belyutin
- Anatoliy Brusilovskiy (Russian)
- Eric Bulatov
- Lucian Gribkov (Russian)
- Andrey Grositskiy (Russian)
- Boris Zhutovsky (Russian)
- Gayana Kazhdan (Russian)
- Boris Kozlov (Russian)
- Pavel Nikonov
- Vladimir Pyatnitskiy (Russian)
- Dmitri Plavinsky
- Leonid Rabichev
- Alexey Rossal-Voronov (Russian)
- Vadim Sidur
- Alexey Smirnov (Russian)
- Eduard Steinberg
- Boris Steinberg (Russian)
- Oleg Vassiliev (painter)
- Yuriy Vasilyev-MON (Russian)
- Nikolay Vechtomov (Russian)
- Vladimir Weisberg
- Vladimir Yankilevsky
- Alexander Zhdanov (Russian)

=== 1970s–1990s ===
- Mikhail Arkhangelskiy (Russian)
- Petr Belenok (Russian)
- Ivan Chuykov (Russian)
- Eduard Gorokhovskiy (Russian)
- Julia Dolgorukova (Zhudro) (Russian)
- Eduard Drobitsky
- Mikhail Fyodorov-Roshal (Russian)
- Francisco Infante-Arana
- Ilya Kabakov
- Alexey Kamenskiy (Russian)
- Viacheslav Koleichuk
- Natta Konysheva
- Yuriy Kosagovskiy (Russian)
- Dmitriy Krasnopevtsev (Russian)
- Valentina Kropivnitskaya (Russian)
- Eduard Kurochkin (Russian)
- Vladimir Lemport (Russian)
- Dmitriy Lion (Russian)
- Igor Makarevich (Russian)
- Tatyana Nazarenko
- Ernst Neizvestny
- Vladimir Nemukhin
- Yuriy Nolev-Sobolev (Russian)
- Igor Palmin
- Dmitry Plavinsky
- Sergey Potapov (Russian)
- Anatoly Safokhin (Russian)
- Nikolay Silis (Russian)
- Igor Snegur (Russian)
- Marlen Spindler
- Tamara Ter-Ghevondyan (Russian)
- Boris Turetsky
- Igor Voroshilov (Russian)
- Igor Vulokh
- Vladimir Yakovlev (artist) (Russian)
- Natalia Yegorshina (Russian)
- Alexander Yulikov (Russian)
- Valeriy Yurlov (Russian)
- Rimma Zanevskaya-Sapgir (Russian)
- Yuri Zlotnikov (Russian)
- Vladislav Zubarev (Russian)

Several more representatives of the Second Russian avant—garde participated in the exhibitions "Malaya Gruzinskaya 28 - From the Bulldozer exhibition to the Manege" in Central Exhibition Hall Manege (Moscow) Moscow, April 1991 and the anniversary exhibition on Gogol Boulevard dedicated to the 20th anniversary of the exhibition in the pavilion "Beekeeping" at the VDNH. Moscow, 1995. This is Eduard Drobitsky, President of the Creative Union of Artists of Russia, Ernst Neizvestny, Evgeny Molokov, head of the "Most" group, Natta Konysheva, Tatyana Nazarenko, Julia Dolgorukova (Zhudro) and others.

== Exhibitions ==
- 1962 - Exhibition of the 30th anniversary of the Moscow Union of Artists in the Manege (Moscow)
- 1960-1992 - exhibitions of "New Reality" (Abramtsevo)
- 1969 - joint exhibition with L. Gribkov. Vspolny (Moscow)
- 1989 - the first exhibition of the studio "Temporal Reality". Central House of Artists (Moscow)
- 1990 – exhibition “From the Manege to the Manege. New Reality”, together with the artists of the New Reality. Central Exhibition Hall Manege (Moscow)
- 1991 — Exhibition “Malaya Gruzinskaya Street 28 — From the Bulldozer Exhibition to the Manege” Central Exhibition Hall Manege (Moscow), Moscow.
- 1995 — Anniversary exhibition on Gogolevsky Boulevard, commemorating the 20th anniversary of the exhibition held in the “Beekeeping” pavilion at the USSR Exhibition of Achievements of National Economy (VDNKh).

== See also ==
- Second Russian Avant-Garde (Russian)
