= Soviet art =

Soviet art is the visual art style produced after the Russian Revolution of 1917 and during the existence of the Soviet Union, until its collapse in 1991. The Russian Revolution led to an artistic and cultural shift within Russia and the Soviet Union as a whole, including a new focus on socialist realism in officially approved art.

== Soviet art of the post-revolutionary period ==
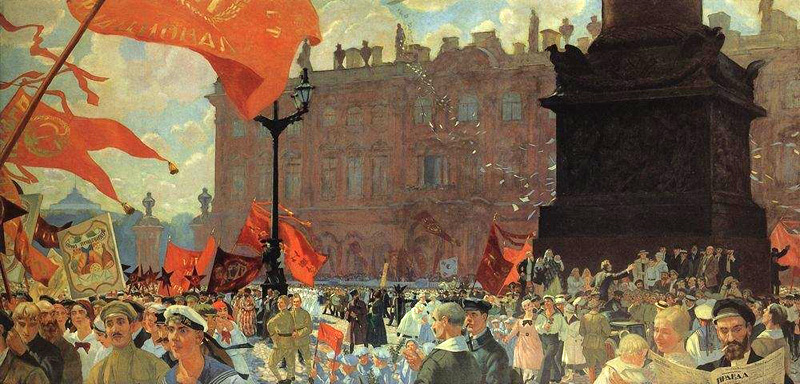
Boris Kustodiev, Celebration Marking the Opening of the 2nd Congress of the Comintern on Uritsky Square in Petrograd, 19 June 1920, 1921

During the 1920s, there was intense ideological competition between different artistic groupings striving to determine the forms and directions in which Soviet art would develop, seeking to occupy key posts in cultural institutions and to win the favor and support of the authorities.

In the late 1920s, the government became more focused on evaluating sexuality in art through the lens of socialist morality. This resulted in increased criticism of artists like Kasyan Goleizovsky and Alexander Grinberg.

This struggle was made even more bitter by the growing crisis of radical leftist art. At the turn of the 1930s, many avant-garde tendencies had exhausted themselves, and their former proponents began depicting real-life objects as they attempted to return to the traditional system of painted images, including the leading Jack of Diamonds artists. In the early 1930s, Kazimir Malevich (1879–1935) returned to figurative art.

A group of prominent supporters of leftist views included David Shterenberg, Alexander Drevin, Vladimir Tatlin, Wassily Kandinsky, Kazimir Malevich, Osip Brik, Sofya Dymshits-Tolstaya, Olga Rozanova, Mikhail Matyushin, and Nathan Altman. They held positions within the Soviet government and local Moscow and Petrograd Soviets, determining the policy of the Fine Arts department.

The position of the Fine Arts Department was most fully expressed by Nikolay Punin in 1919. He wrote: "If the depiction of the world does aid cognition, then only at the very earliest stages of human development, after which it already becomes either a direct hindrance to the growth of art or a class-based interpretation of it", and "The element of depiction is already an element characteristic of a bourgeois understanding of art".

Representatives of Russian art who had begun their careers before the revolution pointed out the danger of a break with the traditions of progressive pre-revolutionary art and the art school. These included Dmitry Kardovsky, Isaak Brodsky, Alexander Savinov, Abram Arkhipov, Boris Kustodiev, Kuzma Petrov-Vodkin, Arkady Rylov, Anna Ostroumova-Lebedeva, Mikhail Avilov, Alexander Samokhvalov, Boris Ioganson, Rudolf Frentz, and others. In the 1920s, the development of Soviet art and its art school was influenced by the incessant polemics and contests between various artistic tendencies.

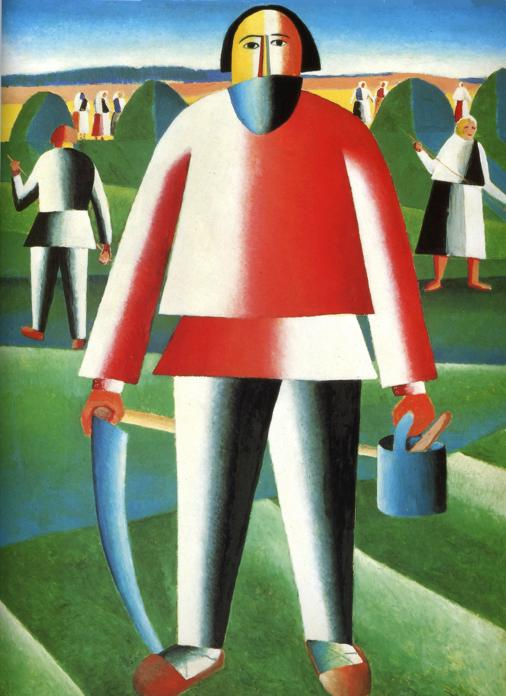
Kazimir Malevich, Mower, 1930.

Proletkult was formed just days before the October Revolution and aimed to put all arts at the service of the dictatorship of the proletariat. Initially supported by Narkompros, it eventually declined considerably and was disbanded in 1932.

The avant-garde movement attracted the interests of the Proletkult organization, which was highly eclectic in its art forms and included modern directions like impressionism and cubism.

Among the early experiments of Proletkult was the pragmatic aesthetic of industrial art, the prominent theorist being Boris Arvatov (1896–1940).

Another group was UNOVIS, a very short-lived but influential collection of young artists led by Kazimir Malevich in the 1920s.

After the 1917 Russian Revolution the former Imperial Porcelain Factory was renamed the State Porcelain Manufactory, it was also used for propaganda purposes. This porcelain was intended less for everyday use and more for decoration. As early as the 1920s, there were exhibitions of porcelain outside the Soviet Union.

== Art of Socialist Realism ==
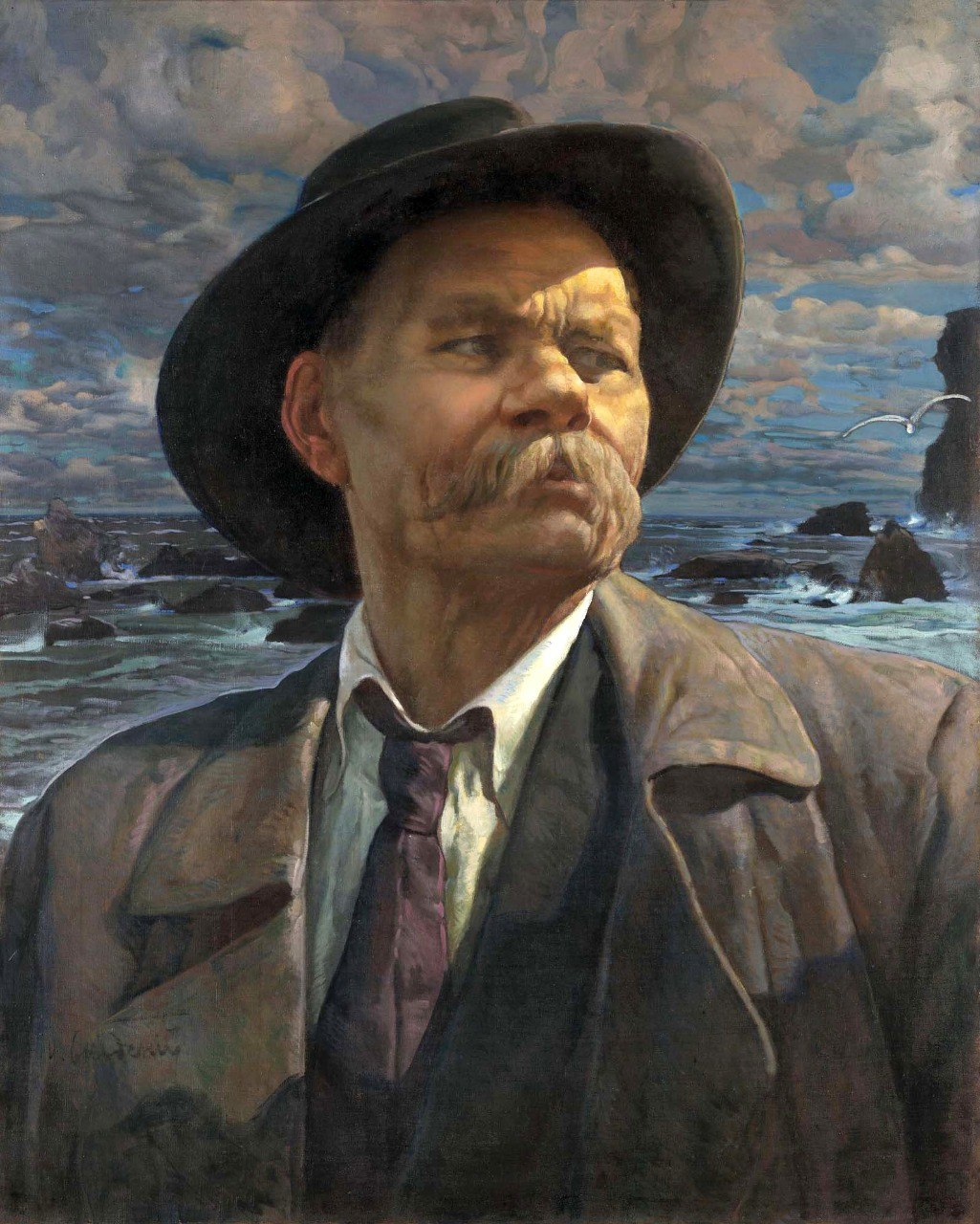
Isaak Brodsky, Maxim Gorky, 1937

Officially approved art was required to follow the doctrine of socialist realism. In the spring of 1932, the Central Committee of the Communist Party decreed that all existing literary and artistic groups and organizations should be disbanded and replaced with unified associations of creative professions. Accordingly, the Moscow and Leningrad Union of Artists was established in August 1932, which brought the history of post-revolutionary art to a close. The epoch of Soviet art began.

In October 1932, the All-Russian Central Executive Committee and the Council of People's Commissars adopted a resolution on the creation of an academy of arts. The Leningrad Institute of Proletarian Fine Art was transformed into the Institute of Painting, Sculpture, and Architecture. This drew a line under a 15-year period of constant change at the country's largest institution for art education. In total, over the period 1917–1991, the Institute graduated more than 10,000 artists and art historians. Among them were such major artists and sculptors of the USSR as Alexander Samokhvalov, Yevsey Moiseyenko, Andrei Mylnikov, Yuri Neprintsev, Aleksandr Laktionov, Mikhail Anikushin, Piotr Belousov, Boris Ugarov, Ilya Glazunov, Nikolai Timkov, and others.

The best-known Soviet artists were Isaak Brodsky, Alexander Samokhvalov, Boris Ioganson, Aleksandr Deyneka, Aleksandr Laktionov, Yuri Neprintsev, and other painters from the Moscow and Leningrad Schools. The Moscow artist Aleksandr Gerasimov produced a large number of heroic paintings of Joseph Stalin and other members of the Politburo during his career. Nikita Khrushchev later alleged that Kliment Voroshilov spent more time posing in Gerasimov's studio than he did attending to his duties in the People's Commissariat of Defense. Gerasimov's painting shows a mastery of classical representational techniques.

However, art exhibitions of 1935–1960 disprove the claims that the artistic life of the period was suppressed by the ideology and artists submitted entirely to what was then called «social order». A great number of landscapes, portraits, genre paintings, and studies exhibited at the time pursued purely technical purposes and were thus free from any ideology. That approach was also pursued ever more consistently in the genre paintings as well, although young artists at the time still lacked the experience and professional mastery to produce works of high art level devoted to Soviet actuality.

A known Russian art historian, Vitaly Manin, considered that «what in our time is termed a myth in the works of artists of the 1930s was a reality, and one, moreover, that was perceived that way by real people. Another side of life did exist, of course, but that does not annul what the artists depicted.... One gets the impression that disputes about art were conducted before and after 1937 in the interests of the party bureaucracy and of artists with a proletarian obsession, but not at all of true artists, who found themes in the contemporary world and did not get embroiled in questions of the form of their expression».

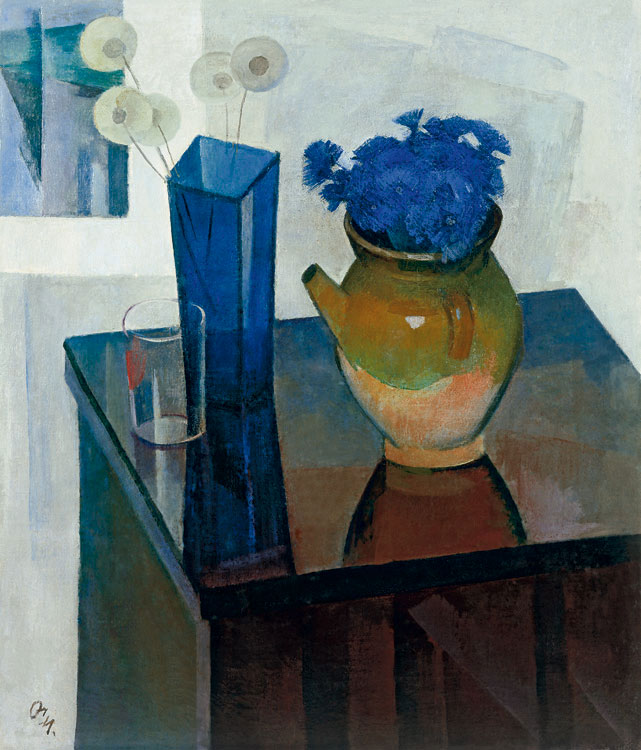
Sergei Osipov, Cornflowers, 1976

In the period between the mid-1950s and 1960s, the art of socialist realism was approaching its apex. Artists who had graduated from the academy (Repin Institute of Arts) in the 1930s–50s were in their prime. They were quick to present their art, they strived for experiments, and they were eager to appropriate a lot and to learn even more. Their art captured the images, ideas, and dispositions of their time and contemporaries through portraits, landscapes, and genre paintings by artists such as Lev Russov, Victor Oreshnikov, Boris Korneev, Semion Rotnitsky, Vladimir Gorb, Engels Kozlov, Nikolai Timkov, Alexander Grigoriev, Aleksei Gritsai, Vladimir Ovchinnikov, Vecheslav Zagonek, Sergei Osipov, Alexander Semionov, Arseny Semionov, Nikolai Galakhov, Geliy Korzhev, Arkady Plastov, Nikolai Pozdneev, Yuri Neprintsev, Fyodor Reshetnikov, Yevsey Moiseyenko, and Andrei Mylnikov. Art of this period showed extraordinary taste for life and creative work.

In 1957, the first All-Union Congress of Soviet Artists takes place in Moscow. It establishes the USSR Union of Artists, which unites over 13000 professional artists from all republics and of all specializations. In 1960, the Union of Artists of the Russian Federation was organized. Accordingly, these events influenced the art life in Moscow, Leningrad, and the province. The scope of experimentation was broadened; in particular, this concerned the form and painterly and plastic languages. Images of youths and students, rapidly changing villages and cities, virgin lands brought under cultivation, grandiose construction plans being realized in Siberia and the Volga region, and great achievements of Soviet science and technology became the chief topics of the new painting. Heroes of the time—young scientists, workers, civil engineers, and physicians—become the most popular heroes of paintings.

At this period, life provided artists with plenty of topics, positive figures, and images. The legacies of many artists and art movements again became available for study and public discussion. This broadened artists’ understanding of the realist method and widened its possibilities. It was the repeated renewal of the very conception of realism that made this style dominate in Russian art throughout its history. Realist tradition gave rise to many trends in contemporary painting, including painting from nature, «severe style» painting, and decorative art. However, during this period, impressionism, postimpressionism, cubism, and expressionism also had their fervent adherents and interpreters.

== Soviet Nonconformist Art ==
The death of Joseph Stalin in 1953 and Nikita Khrushchev's Thaw paved the way for a wave of liberalization in the arts throughout the Soviet Union. Although no official change in policy took place, artists began to feel free to experiment in their work with considerably less fear of repercussions than during the Stalinist period.

In the 1950s, Moscow artist Ely Bielutin encouraged his students to experiment with abstractionism, a practice thoroughly discouraged by the Artists' Union, which strictly enforced the official policy of socialist realism. Artists who chose to paint in alternative styles had to do so completely in private and were never able to exhibit or sell their work. As a result, nonconformist art developed along a separate path from the official art that was recorded in the history books.

Life magazine published two portraits by two painters who, to their minds, were most representative of Russian arts of the period: Serov, an official Soviet icon, and Anatoly Zverev, an underground Russian avant-garde expressionist. Serov's portrait of Vladimir Lenin and Zverev's self-portrait were associated by many with an eternal Biblical struggle between Satan and the Saviour. When Khrushchev learned about the publication, he was outraged and forbade all contacts with Western visitors and closed down all semi-legal exhibitions. Zverev was the main target of his outrage.

The Lianozovo Group was formed around the artist Oscar Rabin in the 1960s and included artists such as Valentina Kropivnitskaya, Vladimir Nemukhin, and Lydia Masterkova. While not adhering to any common style, these artists sought to faithfully express themselves in the mode they deemed appropriate, rather than adhere to the propagandistic style of socialist realism.

Tolerance of nonconformist art by the authorities underwent an ebb and flow until the ultimate collapse of the Soviet Union in 1991. Artists took advantage of the first few years after the death of Stalin to experiment in their work without the fear of persecution. In 1962, artists experienced a slight setback when Nikita Khrushchev appeared at the exhibition celebrating the 30th anniversary of the Moscow Artist's Union at the Moscow Manege exhibition hall, an episode known as the Manege Affair. Among the customary works of Socialist Realism were a few abstract works by artists such as Ernst Neizvestny and Eli Beliutin, which Khrushchev criticized as being "shit" and the artists for being "homosexuals". The message was clear: artistic policy was not as liberal as everyone had hoped.

Politics played a significant role in the development of late Soviet art. Both within the art world and the general public, very little consideration has been given to the aesthetic character of the work produced in the USSR in the 1970s and 1980s. Instead, the official and unofficial art of the period usually stood in for either "bad" or "good" political developments. A more nuanced picture would emphasize that there were numerous competing groups making art in Moscow and Leningrad throughout this period. The most important figures for the international art scene have been the Moscow artists Ilya Kabakov, Erik Bulatov, Andrei Monastyrsky, Vitaly Komar, and Aleksandr Melamid.

The most infamous incident regarding nonconformist artists in the former Soviet Union was the 1974 Bulldozer Exhibition, which took place in a park just outside Moscow and included work by such artists as Oscar Rabin, Komar and Melamid, Alexandr Zhdanov, Nikolai Smoliakov, and Leonid Sokov. The artists involved had written to the authorities for permission to hold the exhibition but received no answer to their request. They decided to go ahead with the exhibition anyway, which consisted solely of unofficial works of art that did not fit into the rubric of socialist realism. The KGB put an end to the exhibition just hours after it opened by bringing in bulldozers to completely destroy all of the artworks present. However, the foreign press had been there to witness the event, and the worldwide coverage of it forced the authorities to permit an exhibition of nonconformist art two weeks later in Izmailovsky Park in Moscow.

A few West European collectors supported many of the artists in the Soviet Union during the 1960s and 1970s. One of the leading collectors and philanthropists was the couple Kenda and Jacob Bar-Gera. The Bar-Gera Collection consists of some 200 works by 59 Soviet-era Russian artists who did not want to embrace the official art directive of the post-Stalinist Soviet Union. Kenda and Jacob Bar-Gera, both survivors of the Holocaust, supported these partially persecuted artists by sending them money or painting materials from Germany to the Soviet Union. Even though Kenda and Jacob did not meet the artists in person, they bought many of their paintings and other art objects. The works were smuggled to Germany by hiding them in the suitcases of diplomats, traveling businessmen, and students, thus making the Bar-Gera Collection of Russian Non-Conformists among the largest of its kind in the world. Among others, the collection contains works of Bachtschanjan Vagritsch, Jankilevskij Wladimir, Rabin Oskar, Batschurin Ewganij, Kabakov Ilja, Schablavin Sergei, Belenok Piotr, Krasnopevcev Dimitrij, Schdanov Alexander, Igor Novikov, Bitt Galina, Kropivnitzkaja Walentina, Schemjakin Michail, Bobrowskaja Olga, Kropivnitzkij Lew, Schwarzman Michail, Borisov Leonid, Kropiwnizkij Jewgenij, Sidur Vadim, Bruskin Grischa, Kulakov Michail, Sitnikov Wasili, and many others.

By the end of the 1980s, Mikhail Gorbachev's policies of Perestroika and Glasnost made it virtually impossible for the authorities to place restrictions on artists or their freedom of expression. With the collapse of the Soviet Union, the new market economy enabled the development of a gallery system, which meant that artists no longer had to be employed by the state and could create work according to their own tastes as well as the tastes of their private patrons. Consequently, after around 1986, the phenomenon of nonconformist art in the Soviet Union ceased to exist.

== Gallery ==
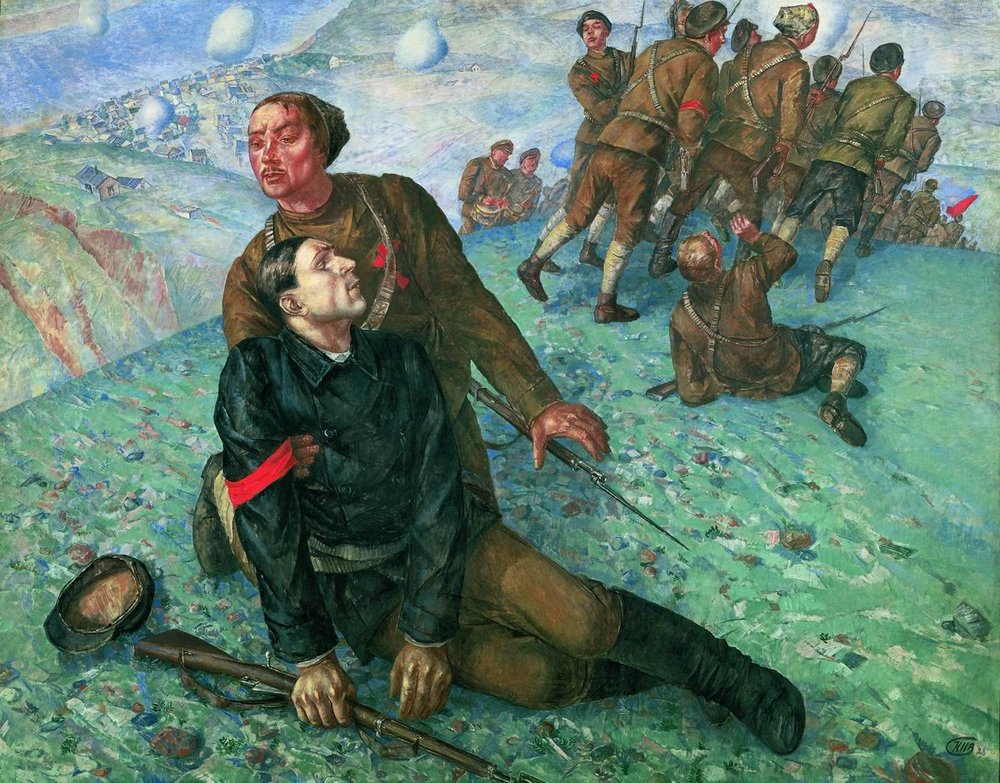
Kuzma Petrov-Vodkin, Death of a Commissar, 1928

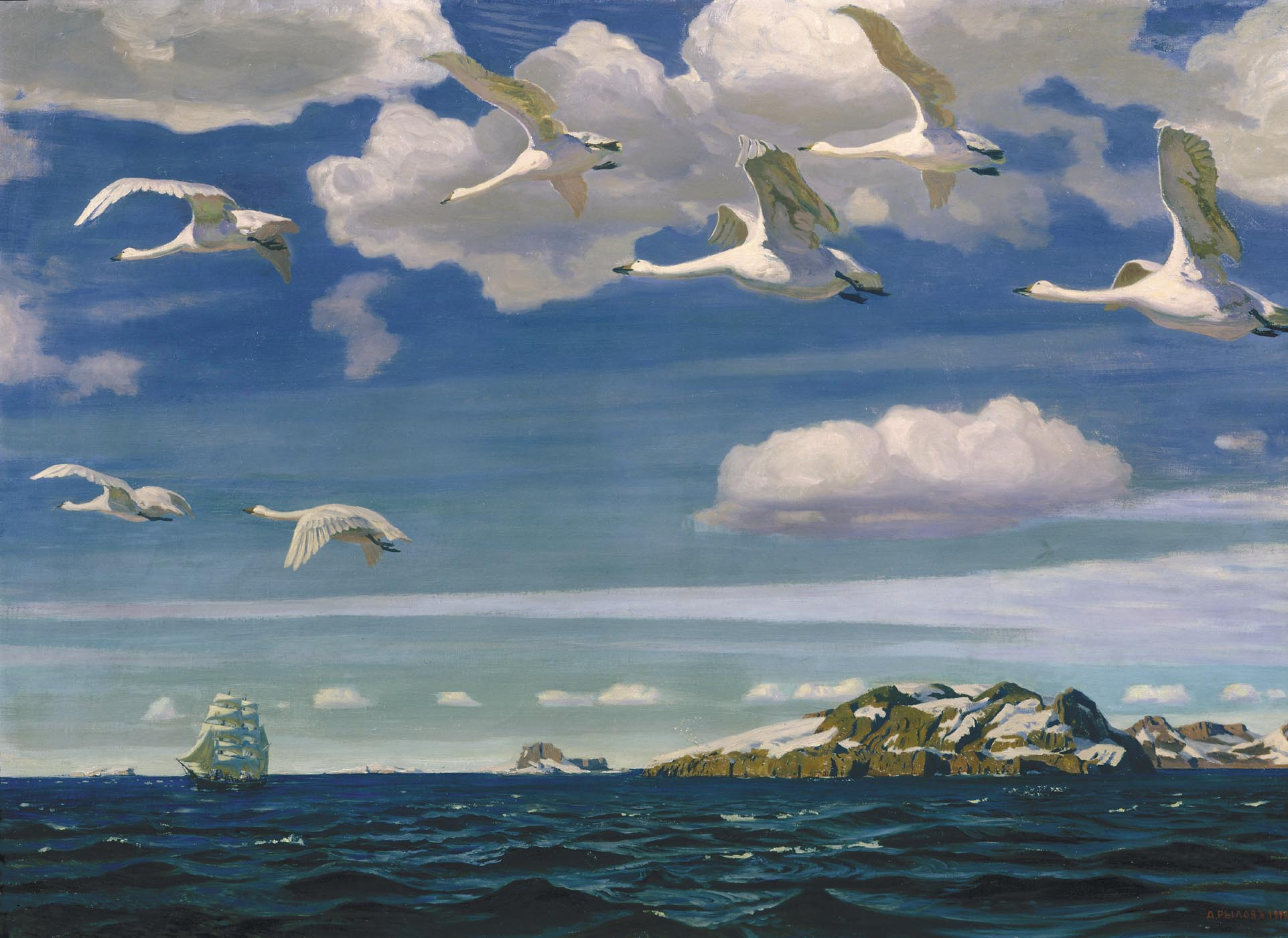
Arkady Rylov, In the Blue Expanse, 1918

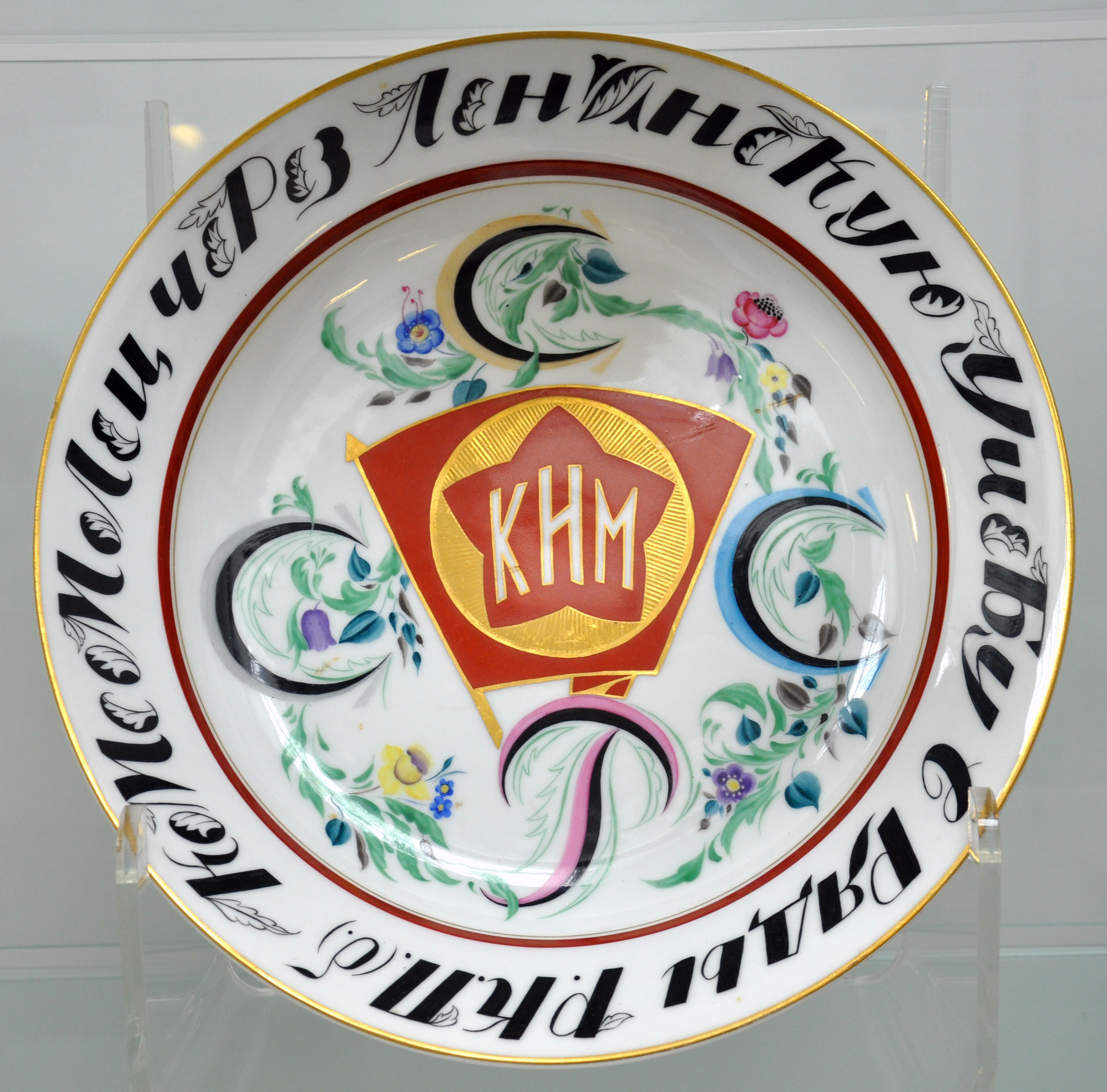
Sergey Chekhonin. Agitation porcelain. Plate. 1925

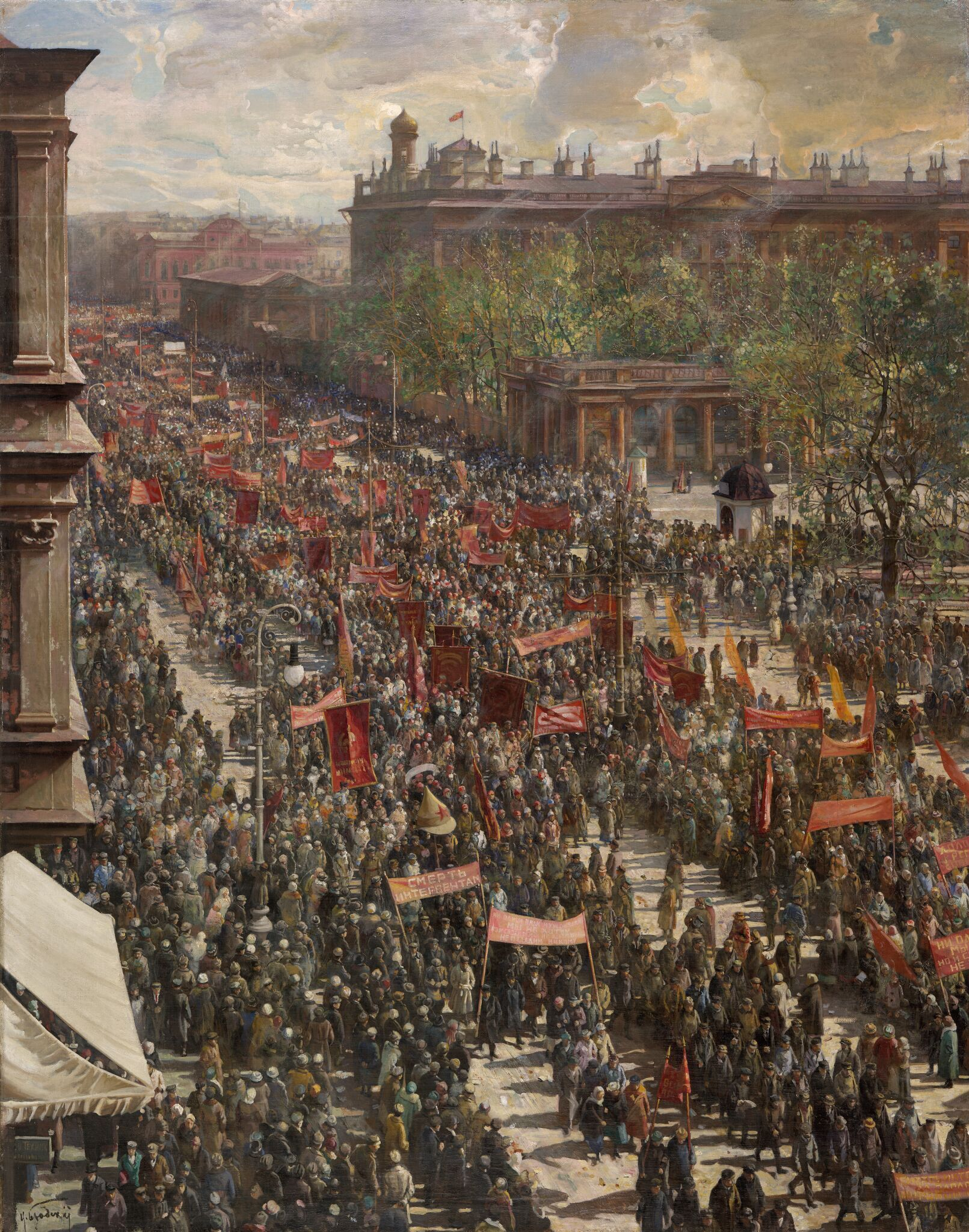
Isaak Brodsky, A Demonstration on 25 October Prospect, 1934

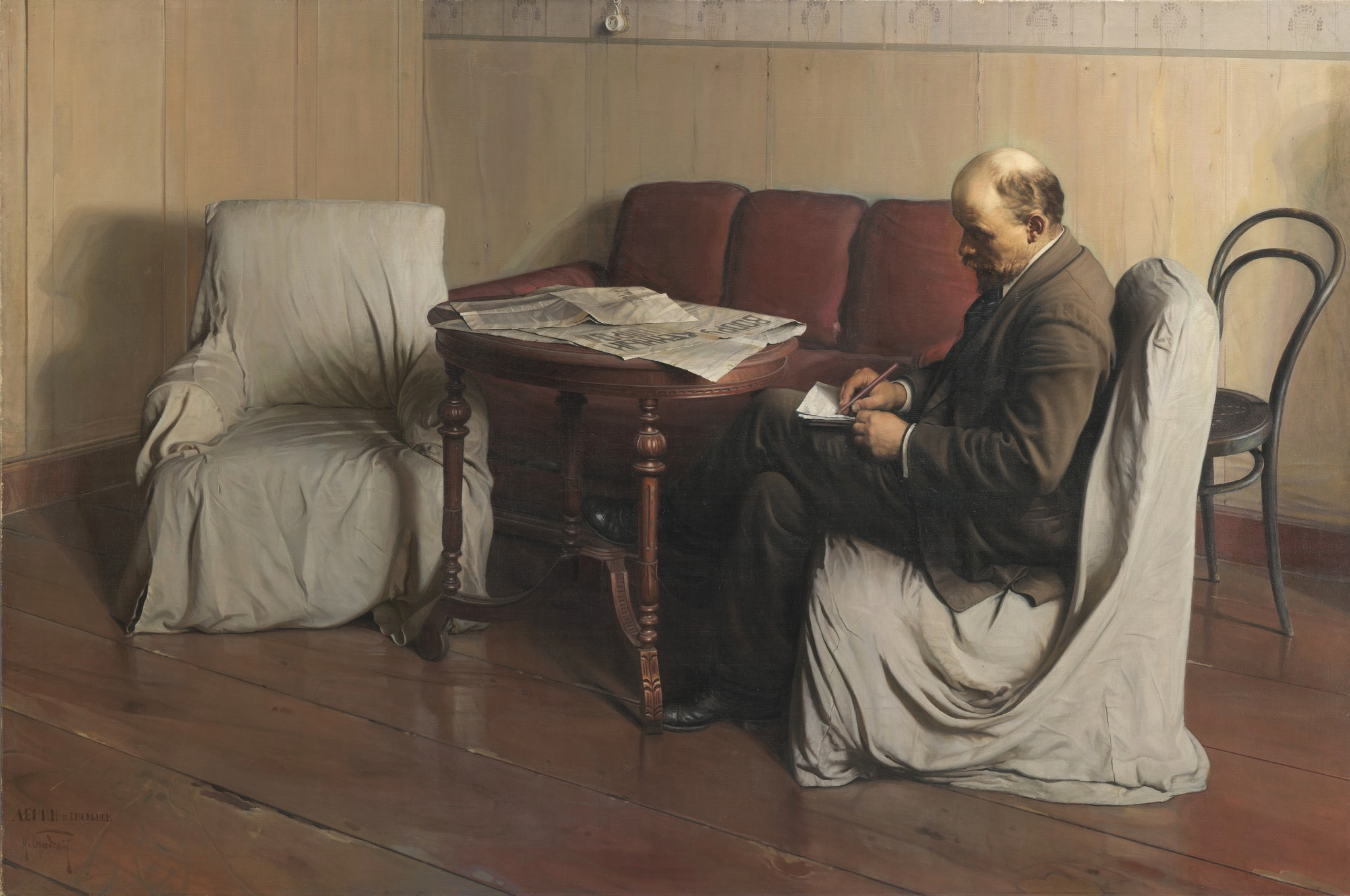
Isaak Brodsky, Lenin in Smolny, 1930

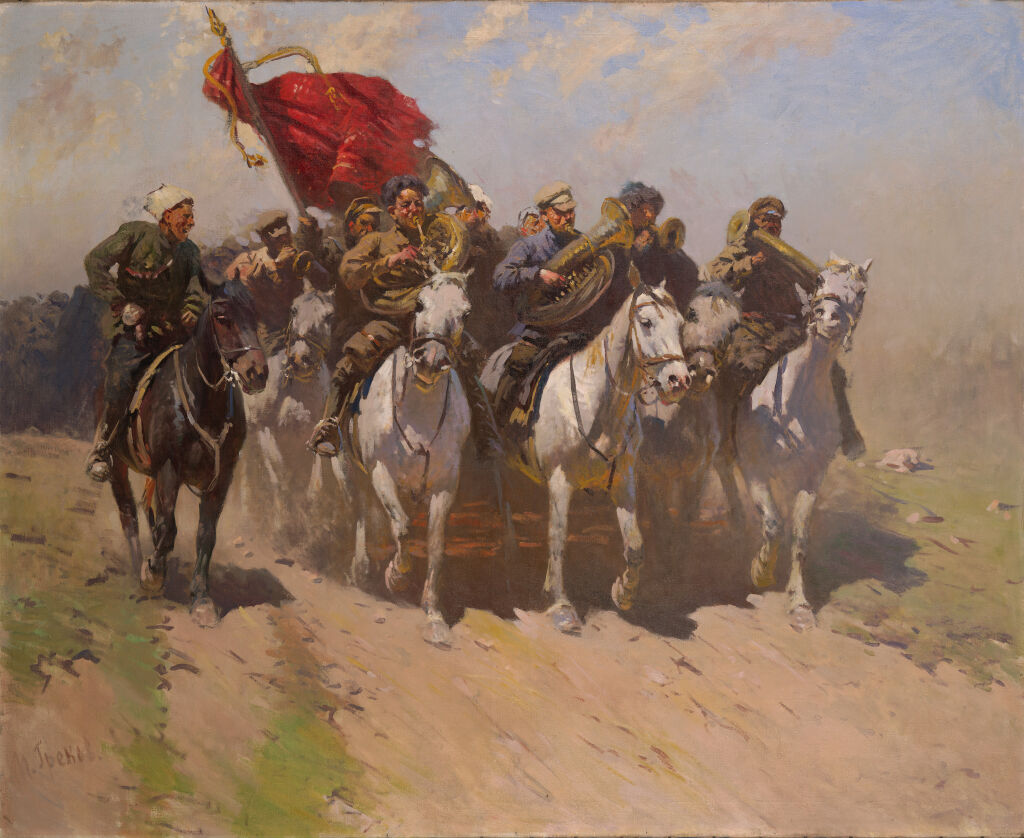
Mitrofan Grekov, The Trumpeters of the 1st Cavalry Army, 1934

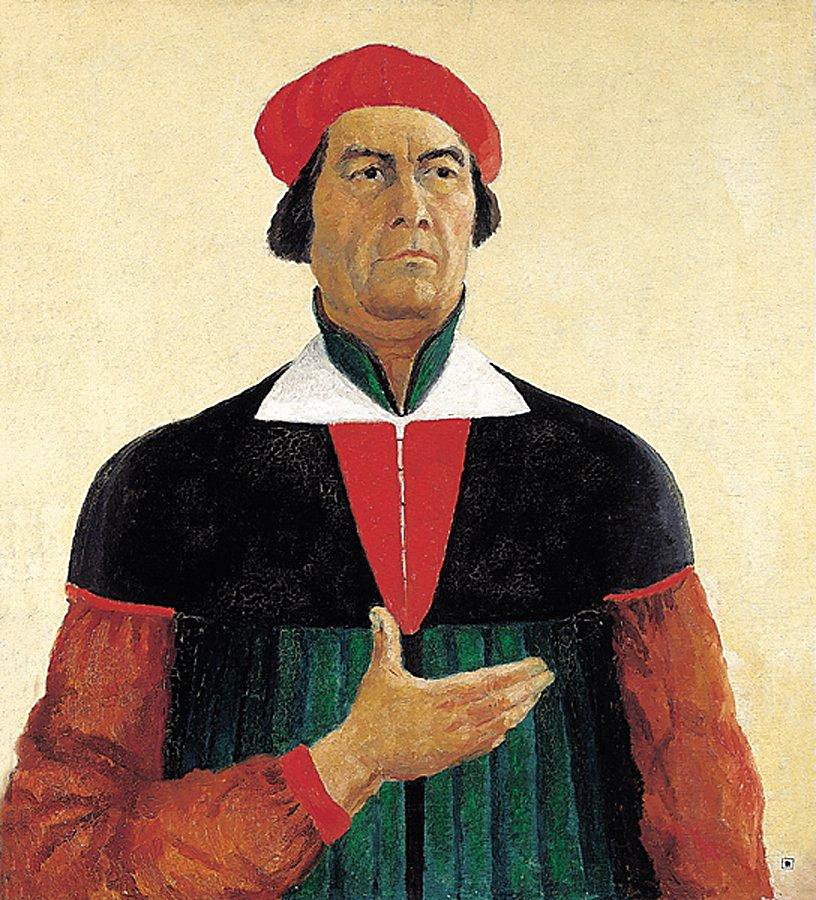
Kazimir Malevich, Self-Portrait, 1933.

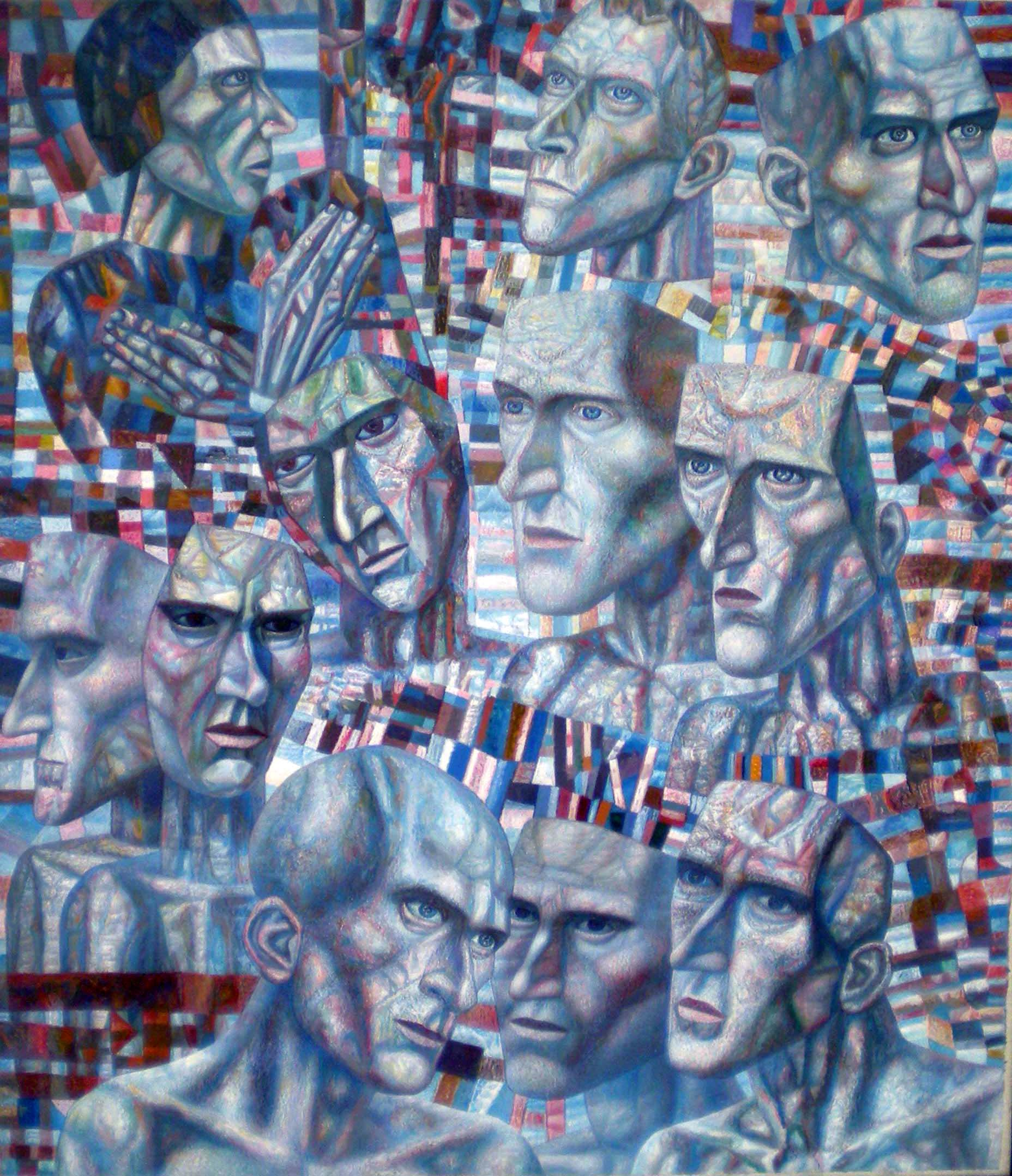
Pavel Filonov, Shock-Workers, 1935

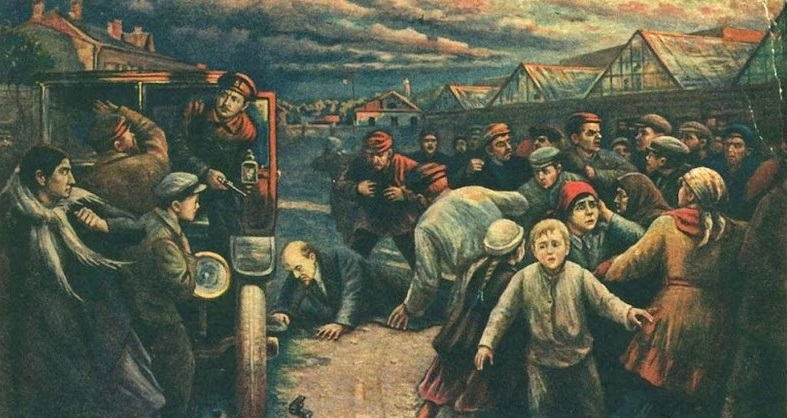
Vladimir Pchelin, Incident at the Michelson Factory, 1927

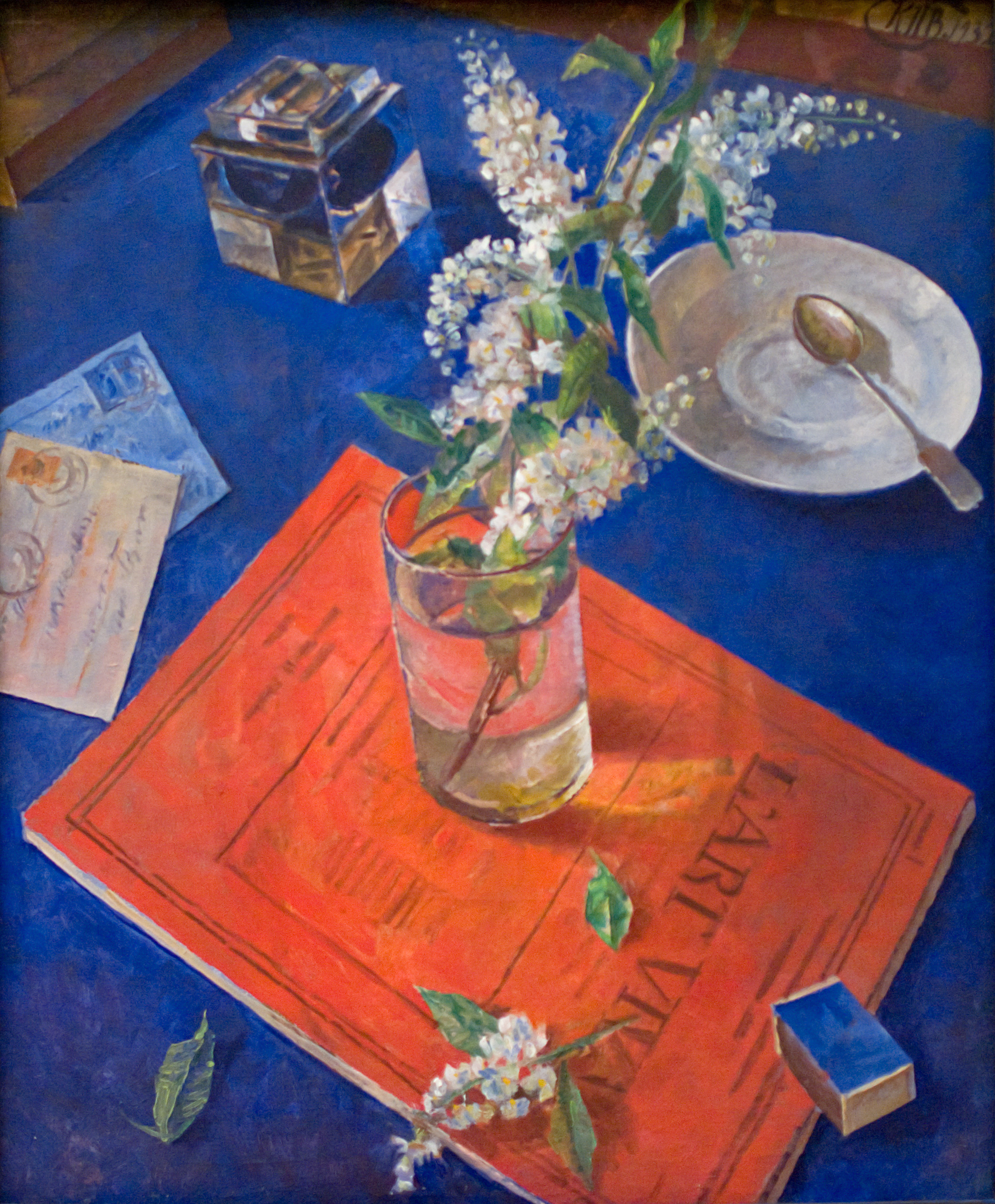
Kuzma Petrov-Vodkin, Bird Cherry in a Glass,1932.

== See also ==
- Fine Art of Leningrad
- Leningrad School of Painting
- List of Russian artists
- List of painters of Saint Petersburg Union of Artists
- List of the Russian Landscape painters
- Soviet fashion design
- Soviet-era statues
