= Konyshev =

Konyshev (Russian: Конышев) is a Russian masculine surname, its feminine counterpart is Konysheva. Notable people with the surname include:

- Dimitri Konyshev (born 1966), Russian road bicycle racer
- Natta Konysheva (1935–2022), Russian painter
