= House with Arch =

1972 painting by Sergei Osipov

House with an Arch
- Artist: Sergei Ivanovich Osipov
- Year: 1972
- Medium: Oil on canvas
- Dimensions: 61 cm × 52 cm (24 in × 21 in)
- Location: Private collection

House with an Arch is a painting by the Russian artist Sergei I. Osipov (1915–1985), executed in 1972 during the one of his visit of Staritsa ancient town and recognized as one of his most famous works in the genre of winter cityscape.

== History ==
Sergei Osipov (1915–1985)

Staritsa (Russian: Старица) is a town and the administrative center of Staritsky District of Tver Oblast, located on the Volga River, 77 kilometers (48 mi) from Tver, with population of 8,607 (2010). Staritsa located not far from Osipov's native Bezhetsky District. The town was established in 1297 under the name of Gorodok (Городо́к), lit. small town). Since the 15th century, the town has been called Staritsa. In the 15th century, the local principality was ruled by Ivan III's son Andrey, and then by Andrey's son Vladimir. While Ivan the Terrible had no children, Vladimir was regarded by boyars as his only heir. As the Tsar suspected Staritsa's ruler of plotting against him, Vladimir and his children were forced to take poison. The opulence of Staritsa during Vladimir's reign can be seen in the Assumption abbey. Later in 1775, Staritsa became a center of an uyezd.

Osipov especially liked to paint city Staritsa in winter. He was attracted by the preserved ancient Russian architecture and picturesque location of the town. In these trips his companions were artists Arseny Semionov, Vladimir Ovchinnikov, Alexander Naumov, Dmitry Buchkin, Vecheslav Monakhov.

For the first time the painting House with an Arch was exhibited in 1977 year in Leningrad at the common exhibition of Sergei Osipov, Arseny Semionov, and Kirill Guschin in Exhibition Hall of the Leningrad Union of Artists. After Osipov death the painting was shown on his solo exhibition in 1991 at the Exhibition Halls of the Leningrad Union of Artists.

In 1995-1996 the painting was exhibited at The Russian Winter in Painting. Exhibition of works by Saint Petersburg Artists art show in Saint Petersburg in the Nikolai Nekrasov Memorial Museum. In 2007 the «House with Arch» was reproduced and described among 350 art works by Leningrad artists in the book «Unknown Socialist Realism. The Leningrad School», published in Russian and English. In 2011 the painting House with Arch was described in article devoted to the 20th Anniversary of Sergei Osipov one man exhibition of 1991, published in St. Petersburg Art History Notebooks. In the same 2011 «House with Arch» was exhibited at the 60th Anniversary Exhibition of Department of Painting of the Vera Mukhina Institute.

In 2019 the House with Arch was reproduced among 288 art works by Leningrad artists in the book The Leningrad School of Painting. Essays on the History published in Russian and English.

== See also ==
- Artist Sergei Osipov (1915—1985)
- Cornflowers
- Leningrad School of Painting

== Sources ==
- Directory of members of the Leningrad branch of Union of Artists of Russian Federation. Leningrad, Khudozhnik RSFSR, 1980. P.89.
- Sergei Ivanovich Osipov (1915-1985). Painting. Drawing. Exhibition catalogue. Leningrad, Khudozhnik RSFSR, 1990. P.9.
- The Leningrad Artists. Paintings of 1950-1980s. Exhibition catalogue. Saint Petersburg, Saint Petersburg Union of artists, 1994. P.5.
- The Russian Winter in Painting. Exhibition of works by Saint Petersburg Artists. Saint Petersburg, Memorial Museum of Nikolai Nekrasov, 1995. P.4.
- Matthew C. Bown. Dictionary of 20th Century Russian and Soviet Painters 1900-1980s. - London: Izomar, 1998. ISBN 0-9532061-0-6, ISBN 978-0-9532061-0-0.
- Sergei V. Ivanov. Unknown Socialist Realism. The Leningrad School. Saint Petersburg, NP-Print Edition, 2007. P.37. ISBN 5-901724-21-6, ISBN 978-5-901724-21-7.
- Иванов С. В. Двадцать лет спустя. Размышления о выставке Сергея Осипова // Петербургские искусствоведческие тетради. Вып. 21. СПб, 2011. С. 25-31.
- 60 Лет кафедре общей живописи Санкт-Петербургской государственной художественно-промышленной академии имени А. Л. Штиглица. Каталог выставки. СПб, 2011. С.21.
