= Yakov Rubinstein =

Russian art collector

- Яков Евсéевич (Шиевич) Рубинштéйн
- Born: 1900; Warsaw
- Died: 1983 (aged 82–83); Moscow
- Occupation: Art collector

Yakov Evseevich (Shievich) Rubinstein (Russian: Рубинштéйн, Яков Евсéевич (Шиевич)) (1900 Warsaw – 1983 Moscow) was a Russian and Soviet art collector with main focus on the collection of Russian art of the first third of the 20th century.

== Biography ==
Rubinstein was born eight of nine children to a family of a merchant. When his father became merchant of the 2nd guild, he was granted the right to live in Saint Petersburg. One of the R.’s brothers emigrated to Switzerland still before the revolution of 1917, after the revolution one part of the family returned to Poland and later moved to France. The father and one of the older brothers of R., Kelman, were deported from the occupied France and murdered in Auschwitz. R. remained in Petrograd, which name was changed to Leningrad later, where he earned his degree in economics.

== Art collection ==
The foundation for the collection, which R. collected together with his second wife T. S. Zhegalova, was laid during the years after the Stalin's death. His attention for old European masters was quickly replaced by an interest in Russian painters of the first third of the 20th century. The means for the extension of the collection were provided significantly by his salary as a doctor of economics and his countrywide lectures.

The main principle of the collecting activity of R., who was on friendly terms with many painters (G. Vereyskiy, P. Kuznetsov, V. Lebedev were among R.’s friends) was the orientation on the artistic quality instead of famous names, which brought not only the works of B. Grigoriev, B. Kustodiev, M. Larionov, I. Mashkov, Z. Serebryakova, R. Falk to the collection, but also the works of painters that were lesser known in the 1960s and 1970s – A. Bogomazov, S. Nikritin, N, Sinezubov, L. Chupyatov, V. Yustitskiy and others. A great merit of the collector was the rescuing of many of art works from destruction.

The Rubinstein's collection held in his apartment in Maliy Levshinskiy alley in Moscow, included the sections Russian paintings, drawings and theatrical scenic paintings of the first third of the 20th century, posters of the first years after the revolution, Soviet agitation china, Russian icons, and works of Soviet underground artists of the 1960s and 1970s and graphic portraits of people of art. While the collector still was alive, his collection was almost the largest private art collection in Moscow. After the death of R. his collection became dispersed, only one fourth of it exists today as a homogeneous collection.

== Exhibitions of works from the collection of J. E. Rubinstein ==
- 1966 Exhibition of paintings, drawings and watercolor paintings by Russian painters from the collection of J. E. Rubinstein (Tallinn)
- 1967 Paintings and drawings by Russian painters of the first third of the 20th century. From the collection of J. E. Rubinstein and T. S. Zhegalova (travelling exhibition: Moscow, Tallinn, Vilnius, Kaunas, Alma-Ata, Novosibirsk, Lvov, Vologda)
- 1973 Russian and Soviet painters of the first half of the 20th century. Exhibition of drawings from the collection of J. E. Rubinstein (Dmitrovograd)
- 1978 - 79 Russian and Soviet theatrical scenic art from the collection of J. E. Rubinstein and I. V. Kachurin (travelling exhibition: Tallinn, Kostroma, Yaroslavl)
- 1980 Posters of the first years after the October revolution (Yaroslavl)
- 1981 Posters of the first decade after the October revolution and works by theater painters from the collection of J. E. Rubinstein (Moscow)
- 1982 Russian drawings of the 18th to 20th century (from the collection of I. V. Kachurin and J. E. Rubinstein). Portraits by Russian and Soviet artists of the first half of the 20th century (from the collection of J. E. Rubinstein) (Leningrad)
- 1982 The painter and the theater. From the collection of J. E. Rubinstein (Archangelsk)
- 1982 Exhibitions of works from the collections of J. E. Rubinstein and I. V. Kachurin (Leningrad)
- 2010 The colors of memory. Private collection of Jakov Rubinstein / Die Farben der Erinnerung. Privatsammlung Jakov Rubinstein (Düsseldorf, Germany)
- 2015 Selected works of Russian and Jewish Artists from the Rubinstein Collection. Künstlerverein Malkasten (Düsseldorf, Germany)
