= Ely Bielutin =

Russian painter

Ely Bielutin (Russian: Элий Михайлович Белютин, Eliy Mikhailovich Belyutin) – (10 June 1925, Moscow – 27 February 2012, Moscow) was a Russian visual artist and art theoretician, the founder of The New Reality artistic academy.

Bielutin graduated from the Surikov Moscow Art Institute where he studied under representatives of the Russian avant-garde such as Aristarch Lentulov and Pavel Kuznetsov. In 1948 Bielutin founded “The New Reality” artistic academy. In 1964 he relocated the academy to Abramtsevo, in the outskirts of Moscow. In 1962, a comprehensive exhibition to commemorate the 30th anniversary of the Moscow Union of Artists was held at the Manezh. The works of Bielutin's disciples constituted a large part of the exhibition. The General Secretary of the Communist Party of the Soviet Union Nikita Khrushchev severely criticized the exhibition and as a result it was dismantled. This event marked the end of the period of liberal reforms ranging from agriculture to foreign policy collectively known as the Khrushchev Thaw.

In 1991, a large retrospective of the artists-members of the New Reality School took place in Manez with a comprehensive catalogue published on the occasion of the exhibition.

Ely Bielutin was one of the first exponents of Russian abstract art. Having gone through quasi-Expressionist period (Lenin’s Funeral, 1962, The State Tretyakov Gallery, Moscow), the artist developed his own version of abstract idiom (module painting) partially influenced by Western abstract paintings he saw during the exhibition in Moscow in 1957. According to Beliutin’s “Theory of Universal Contact” (he published an eponymous book in 1991), art is the means of bringing the state of balance into the relationship of man and nature.

Ely Bielutin died on 27 February 2012 at the age of 86.

== Museums and public collections ==
- Jane Voorhees Zimmerli Art Museum, The Norton and Nancy Dodge Collection of Soviet Nonconformist Art (1956–1986), Rutgers University, New Brunswick, New Jersey
- Rose Art Museum, Brandeis University, Waltham, Massachusetts
- The State Russian Museum, St. Petersburg
- The State Tretyakov Gallery, Moscow
- Moscow Museum of Modern Art
- The State Historical Museum, Moscow
- The Centre Georges Pompidou, Paris

== Literature ==
- Nadine Shenkar: Ely Bielutin. Ed. SPIRALI/VEL. Milano. 2003. ISBN 5-902782-04-X

== See also ==
- Soviet art
