= Sergei Osipov (artist) =

Soviet artist (1915–1985)

Sergei Ivanovich Osipov
- Born: 22 September 1915; Stepankovo, Bezhetsky Uyezd, Tver Governorate, Russian Empire
- Died: 12 October 1985 (aged 70); Leningrad, USSR
- Education: Repin Institute of Arts
- Known for: Painting, Art teaching
- Movement: Realism

Sergei Ivanovich Osipov (Russian: Серге́й Ива́нович О́сипов; 22 September 1915 – 12 October 1985) was a Soviet painter, graphic artist, and art teacher, who lived and worked in Leningrad, a member of the Leningrad branch of Union of Artists of Russian Federation. He regarded as one of the representatives of the Leningrad school of painting, most known for his landscape and still life paintings.

== Biography ==
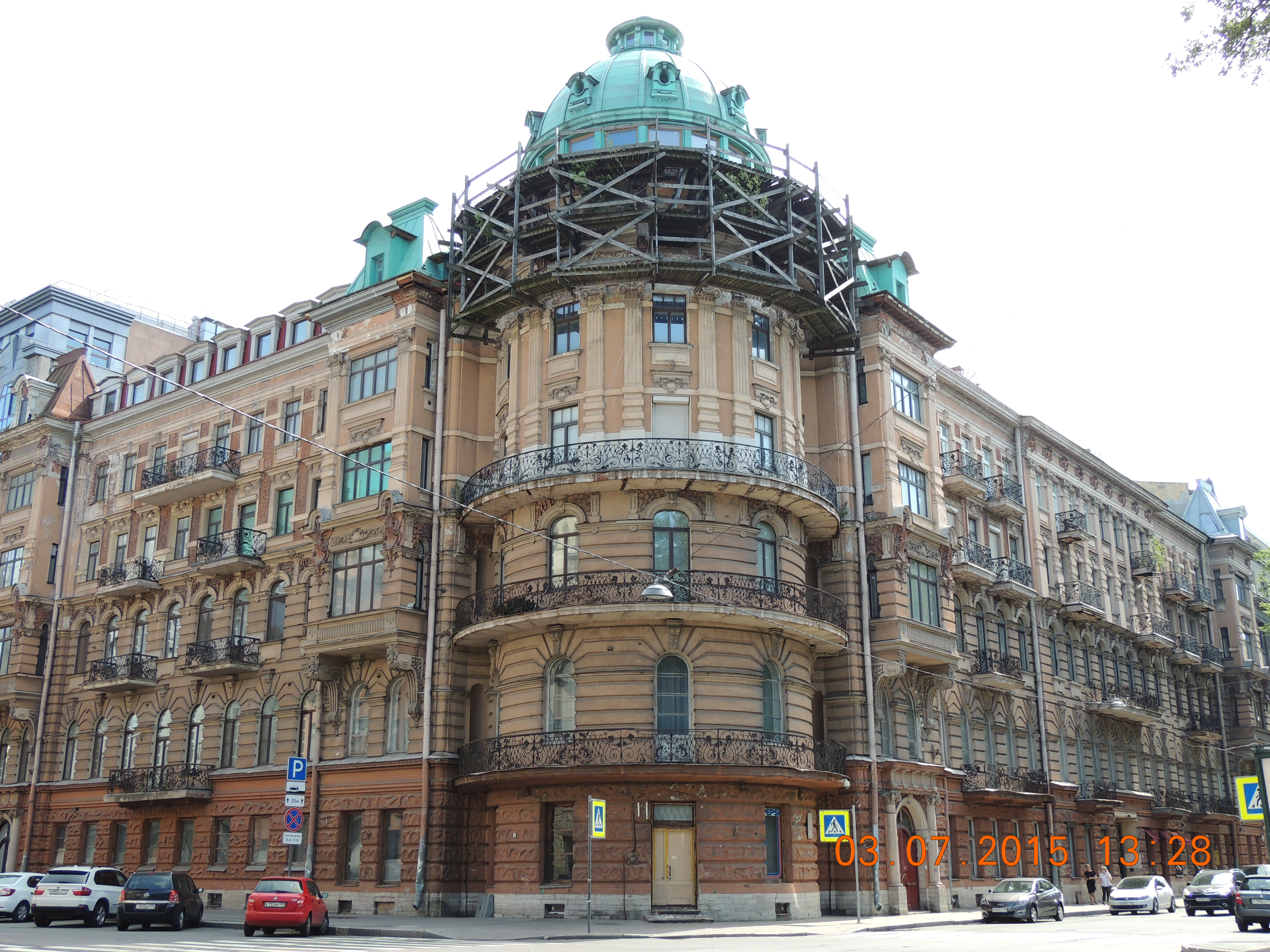
Building of Tavricheskaya Art School

Sergei Osipov was born in a peasant family in the village of Stepankovo in the Bezhetsky Uyezd of the Tver Governorate. Since pre-revolutionary years, his father worked in construction in Leningrad.

Osipov started his education in primary school of the village of Porechie. In 1927 he joined his father in Leningrad. There, he completed seven classes of secondary school No. 57 and entered at a plant. Then he worked with his father in construction. At the same time, Osipov attended evening classes of Tavricheskaya Art School, where he studied with famous teachers Vladimir Sukov and Semion Abugov.

In 1932, Sergei Osipov entered the preparatory classes at the Russian Academy of Arts, and in 1936 he became a student of painting department of the Leningrad Institute of Painting, Sculpture and Architecture. He studied of Semion Abugov, Mikhail Bernshtein, Genrikh Pavlovsky.

After the second year, Alexander Osmerkin invited the young artist to continue studies in his personal workshop. About years of study Osipov left memories:

Alexander Alexandrovich Osmerkin was, in my opinion, a born teacher who knew how, like no one else, to explain the difficulties encountered in the work, while finding surprisingly accurate, sometimes not direct, but giving food for thought words. We painte a model. I work over the canvas, trying to put together the whole production, and applied thousands of fractional strokes with small brushes. Osmerkin said: “Osipov, it would be nice for you to addd a some Fechin ...” And somehow everything became clear.

Personal artistic experience allowed Alexander Osmerkin to discover difficult and subtle connections in the painting of Russian and Western European masters. So, revealing to us the method of Cezanne, he compared it with the picturesque experience of Alexander Ivanov, and then Cezanne's “Mount St. Victoria ”with its transitions of clearly defined color plans – from warm pink and orange to blue and blue – becomes somewhere very close to the Italian canvases of our great Alexander Ivanov.

The Great Patriotic War caught Sergei Osipov on graduate course of Alexander Osmerkin workshop. He volunteered to go to the Red Army and participated in battles at Leningrad. In December 1941, under the demining of passes for the upcoming battalion sailors from Kronshtadt to the Old Peterhoff, he was seriously injured, and lost a leg. He spent more than a year in the hospital for treatment. In 1943, he was discharged as a disabled of the Great Patriotic War.

In the same year Osipov went to Samarkhand to complete his studies at the Institute of Painting, Sculpture and Architecture in Alexander Osmerkin workshop. His graduation work was painting named Partisans, dedicated to the guerrilla struggle against the Nazis in occupied territory of the Soviet Union.

In 1944 Sergei Osipov returned to Leningrad. For the courage shown in the Great Patriotic War against fascist Germany, he was awarded the Order of Glory III degree, medals "Medal "For the Defence of Leningrad"" and "For Victory over Germany".

After almost half a century, the circumstances of the wound and treatment of S. Osipov were described in the memoirs of the head of the surgical department of a military hospital:

In the most difficult time of our hospital’s life at the end of 1941, in the cold and darkness, we had to make the first amputation of the lower leg. The wounded Osipov was admitted to the seventh surgical department. Young, exhausted, with a reddish head of hair and a beard. As I found out 50 years later, he was on the five course at the Academy of Arts. Osipov was shot in the thigh. The wound is small, but a large blood vessel was damaged and gangrene of the foot began. To save the life of the wounded one had to sacrifice a foot. The operation was carried out in purely front-line conditions: in the small cold tent, in the evening, with obligatory darkening of the window, on the bed instead of the operating table, under the light of two flashlights “bat”, and only at the most crucial moment the emergency lamp was turned on. Surgeons, including myself, in quilted jackets under dressing gowns, emaciated, sawed bones with difficulty.

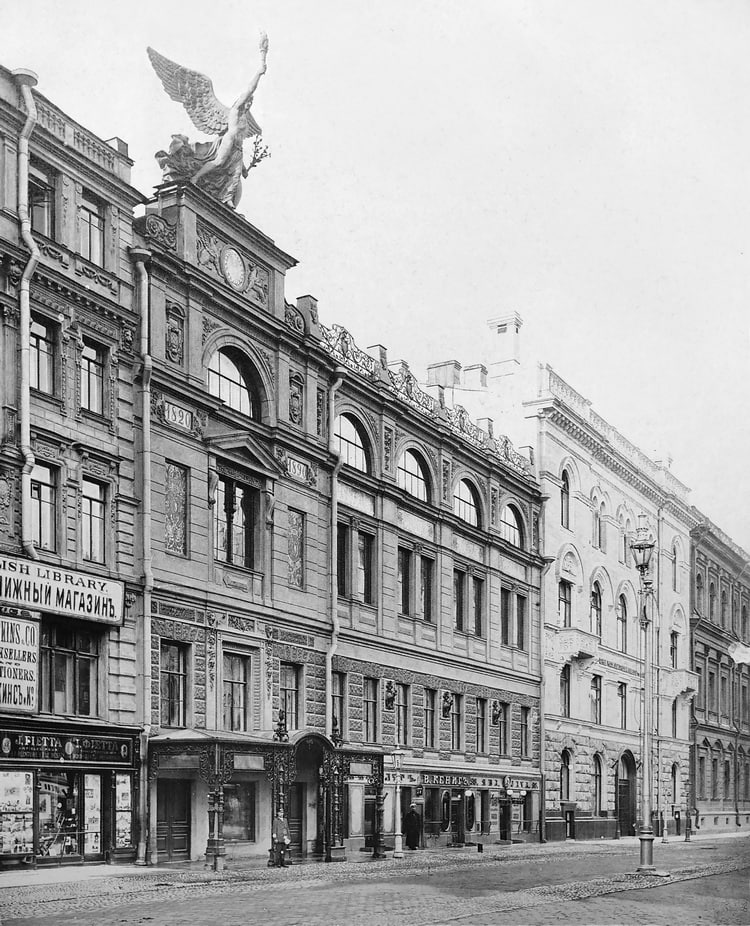
Building of the Leningrad Union of Soviet Artists

The wounded man slowly recovered, his life was saved. After improving his condition, Osipov was evacuated by a plane to the rear for aftercare. Unfortunately, his further fate was unknown to me. And suddenly, accidentally turned on the radio on September 19, 1991 brought me the answer to a question of half a century ago. The art critic Nadezhda Neshataeva spoke about the life of the artist Osipov Sergey Ivanovich in connection with a personal exhibition of his paintings. The coincidence of the name of the artist, his wound near Leningrad, the amputation of the leg in the Leningrad hospital gave me reason to believe that this is our wounded Osipov, who was operated on in blockaded Leningrad by me and another surgeon. The coincidence of the data left almost no doubt that this is the hero of our department and of my memoirs. But still I tried to test myself. Having received information through many inquiries, I phoned the widow of Sergei Ivanovich, Antonina Ivanovna. She confirmed that Sergei Ivanovich was operated on in 1941 in our hospital. She said that he met her at the hospital in Sverdlovsk. Osipov completed his art education in Samarkand, where the Academy of Arts was evacuated from Leningrad. For me and my friends, employees of our surgical department of the hospital, such a belated message about the fate of one of our seriously injured was not only a great joy, but also a reward for our selfless work in the besieged city.

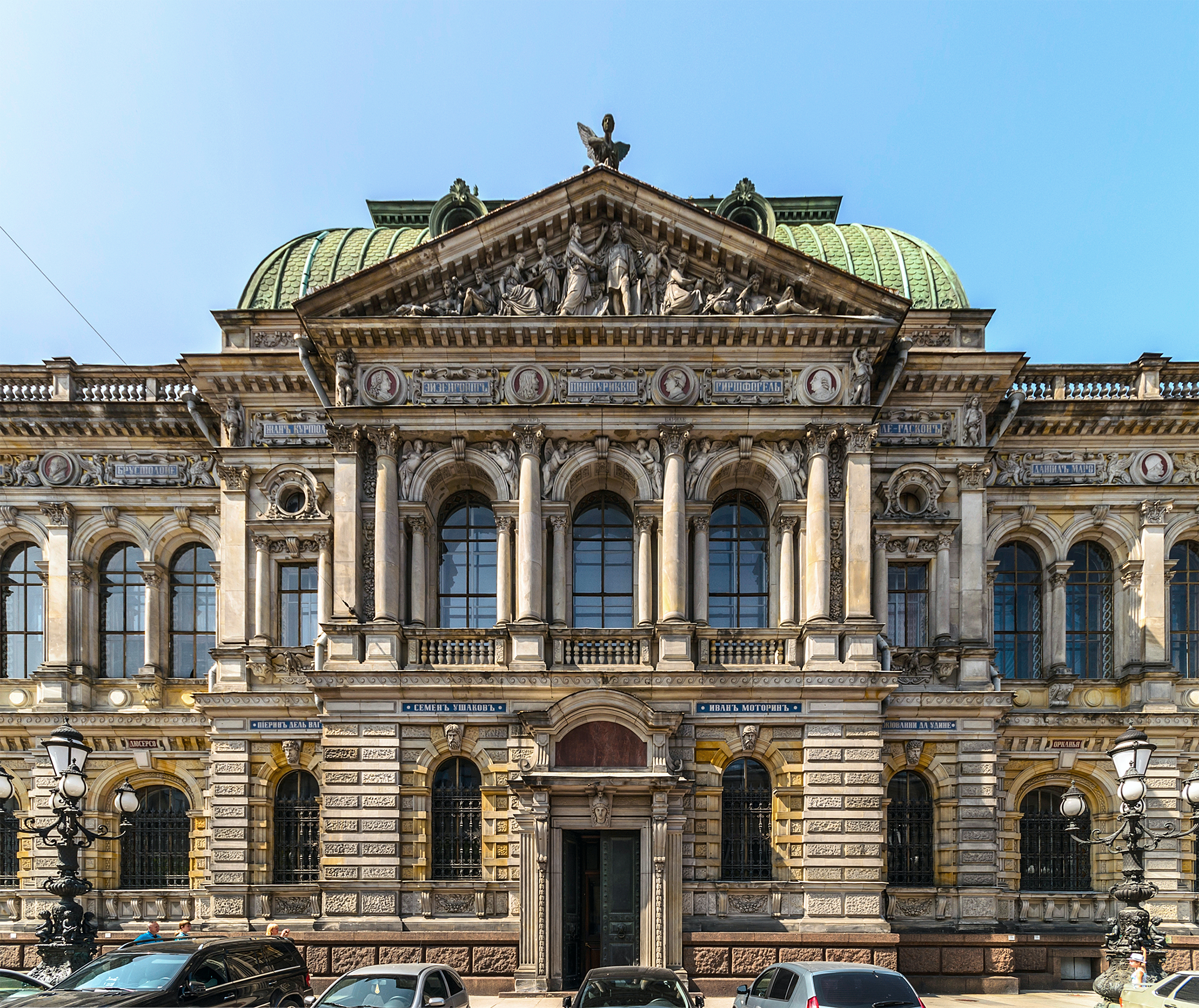
Building of the Vera Mukhina Institute

In 1945 begins a multi-year teaching job Sergei Osipov, first at the Tavricheskaya Art School, then in the years 1946–1949 in the Art Studio at the Palace of Culture named after Maxim Gorky. From 1949 until the end of 1970 Osipov taught at the Department of General painting of the Leningrad Higher School of Art and Industry named after Vera Mukhina.

At the same time since 1944, Sergei Osipov begins to work on contracts with LENIZO. In April 1945 he was taken as a member of the Leningrad Union of Soviet Artists. From the same year, he began to participate in art exhibitions. He painted landscapes, genre scenes, still lifes, gradually restoring lost during the war skills. Later his art has been shown on the solo exhibitions in Moscow (1983) and in Leningrad (1990).

The art works of the 1960–1970s nominated Osipov as one of the leading Leningrad painters with deep and original manner. In 1983, with the support of E. E. Moiseenko, a large solo exhibition of Sergey Osipov's works was shown at the Central House of Artists in Moscow.

Sergei Ivanovich Osipov died on 12 October 1985 in Leningrad at the seventieth year of life.

== Creation ==
In the artistic fate of S. Osipov, which began from the work at diploma picture, which developed progressively, without visible zigzags and jumps, researchers distinguish several periods.

=== 1945–1958 ===
His own recognizable individual style Sergei Osipov acquired gradually. Every year trips from the late 1940s to Staraya Ladoga, Izborsk, Pskov, and Staritsa helped the artist to restore his creative skills and establish himself in a circle of preferred topics. In the middle of 1950s in technical terms he was a well established as a master. This is evidenced his works partly shown at major exhibitions: A Boy (1950), "The Gathering" (1950), Pskov little street (1951), "On the Volga River" (1951), "Last Snow" (1954), "Reaping field" ( 1954), "On the Volkhov River" (1955), "A Little Brook" (1956) and others.

My creative life begins from the work under the landscape, – Osipov wrote in 1968. - The landscape has always interested and excited me as an artist. Working on him, I sought to express my feelings and love to nature of my native land.

About his painting style of this period can be judged by the painting Street. Pskov (1951). The artist himself considered it to be very characteristic of his early work, include this painting among only few works of the early 1950s in the exposition of the Moscow exhibition in 1983. It is distinguished by a certain conventionality of form, timid attempts to go away from the illusory naturalism to a more generalized manner of painting. In the future, Osipov will practically abandon the presence of figures of people in the landscapes and the detailed reproduction of panoramic architectural views.

The just following to nature no longer satisfied the artist. He felt the need to move on. But how, in what way? A new 1958 creative trip to Pskov and its environs gave Osipov, by his own words, some push. Landscapes painted as a result of this trip were positively received by critics.

=== 1959–1969 ===
A real turn in the artist's work was indicated in the works of the very end of the 1950s – beginning of the 1960s. Trusting to his own imagination, striving to achieve harmony and enhance expressiveness, Osipov is now less follow the path of nature, but to construct composition himself, inhabiting his paintings previously observed in life and nature. He boldly uses artistic generalization, sacrificing secondary details in order for more integrity of the image. One of the first works in which Osipov manages to most fully embody new ideas was the painting Little Houses at the Volga River (1959). To assess the turn in the artist's work, it is enough to compare this picture with the painting Street. Pskov (1951), which was mentioned above.

Among the works opening a new period in the artist's creativity were paintings Little Houses at the Volga River (1959), "Outskirts of Village" (1960), On the Volkhov River (1960), "Still Life with Violin" (1960), "In the Old Ladoga" (1961), "Pskov", "Pskov Street" (1962), "Truvor fort", A Little Pskov courtyard (all 1962), "Fortress tower", "A Rick. Autumn", "Fortress in Old Izborsk" (all 1963), "Haymaking" (1964), and others.

The work of Osipov was inextricably linked with the theme of the Motherland – the Tver land, its nature, ancient Russian cities, and the peasant way of life. Since the end of the 1940s, he will annually, and often several times a year, travel to Staraya Ladoga, Izborsk, Staritsa, Torzhok, Pskov, bringing from these trips numerous studies, sketches and paintings. Then work continued in his city art studio. And so, year after year for forty years.

According to Georgy F. Golenky, a Leningrad art critic and researcher, traveling enriched Osipov's knowledge of the ancient builders of temples and forts. Only then did he realize that the ravines, hills, river beds, trees, houses should be depicted as structural elements of the environment and as small elements of an overall coherent picture of the world, expressing its essential features. Only after this appeared in landscapes of Sergei Osipov soft Russian fruitiness, a clear rhythm, and proportionality, in which we recognize the character of the landscape.

By simplifying and light deformation of objects, Sergei Osipov emphasizes their three-dimensional structure, and internal force, the stress with which they have been created nature or man. "We must remind the viewer about the latent energy which filled every thing, - said the artist. - For me just here is a real hidden source of poetry, rather than in stories about the activities or events."

Indeed, in his canvases nothing "happens." But they come alive traditions, tastes, manners folk, they can feel our connection with life past generations. Another notable feature of his art becomes more abstract forms and the entire composition of the painting, a marked tendency to generalize, allegory, the desire to get away from naturalism to the contemplative and philosophical depth.

Other notable features of Osipov's painting become more conventional of the form and the whole composition of the picture at whole, a marked desire for generalizations, allegory, a desire to get away from contemplative naturalism to philosophical depth and some symbolism, but not crossing the line beyond which painting breaks with the real world. The style of the work of this period resembles a light “semi-cubism”, the form is formed by planes and faces. The most common color is lilac, in lilac tones Osipov writes the sky, water, a neutral background, the wall of the house, surprisingly subtly conveying the mood of the landscape.

=== 1970–1985 ===
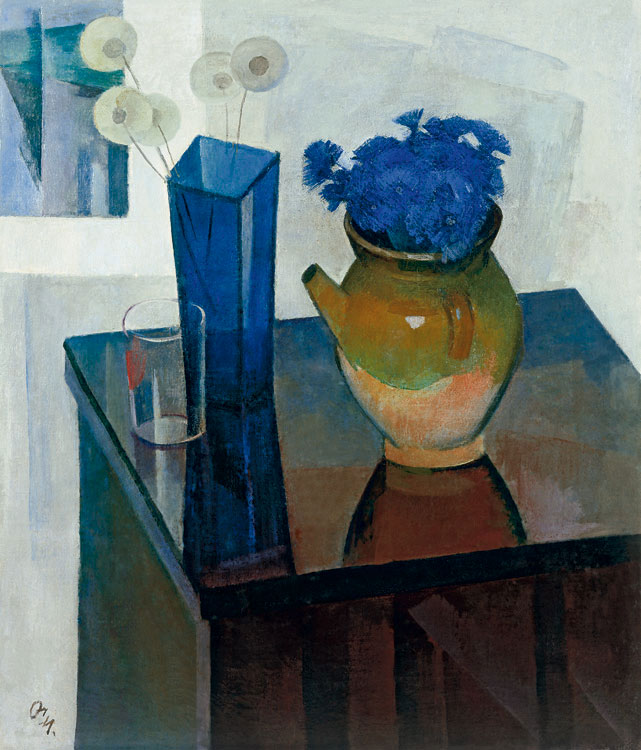
Sergei Osipov. Cornflowers. 1976. 1976

The top of the Osipov's creation falls on the end of 1960s – early 1980s. At this time, he created a number of the best works, mainly in the genre of landscape, as well as a still life, which now occupies no less place in the artist's work. Among them Izborsk. Tower of XVII Century (1967), Crossing over river, In Suzdal, Izborsk Ancient Town (all 1968), "Still Life with a Balalaika", Silver villows, Wildflowers, Ravine. Grey Day (all 1970), "House with Arch", "Still Life with White Jug" (both 1972), "Autumn branch", "Staritsa town in winter", Landscape with Fortress, Winter in Staritsa (all 1974), "Cornflowers" (1976), "A Forest River" (1976), "Izborsk's slopes" (1978), "Small rick in rainy day" (1981), "Early green" (1982), "Dandelions" (1985), and others.

The theme of spiritual sources, present in Sergei Osipov's earlier still lifes, is also present in works such as Cornflowers (1976), Still Life with a White Pitcher (1972), Autumn Branch (1974), Dandelions (1985), and others. Compared to his earlier works, which included more detailed compositions, these works have been described as containing greater depth of image and associative subtext.

The works of Sergei Osipov added to the Leningrad painting of 1970s. In his paintings much inspiration comes from the art of ancient Russian masters: laconicism of the artistic language, conventionality of form and accuracy of composition, resourcefulness in details, integrity, and expressiveness of the image built on unpretentious peasant material.

Svetlana Makhlina opined that:

Small landscapes of Sergei Osipov are endowed with extraordinary power of influence on the audience. And the point here is not only that the painter, using the image of nature in its many manifestations, creates landscapes that are consonant with the mental state of man. In all his works, the theme of the Motherland is revealed, sung by the artist with great filial love. And this is quite difficult, because raising a big topic and making it close and understandable in the landscape genre is very and very difficult.

Through all creativity of Osipov, the thought of continuity, of spiritual and cultural inheritance passes. In his works, the national past is not inseparable from the present. With his works, the author, as it were, confirms the idea that the beauty created by the ancestors does not lose its significance over time. She retains the ability to beneficially influence people and should be included in the spiritual life of contemporaries.

His style of this time similar of a light semi-Cubism. These paintings are nominated Osipov of the leading artists of the Leningrad school, who made his own contribution to its identity and significance.

== Art Heritage ==
In 1990, a posthumous exhibition of works by Sergei Osipov was shown in the halls of the Leningrad Union of Artists. For the first time, Osipov's artistic heritage was presented with such fullness.

His paintings reside in State Russian Museum, in the museums of Tomsk, Volgograd, Cheboksary, in other Art museums and private collections in Russia, France, USA, England, Finland, and others.

In 2016, the Elena and Gennady Timchenko Charity Fund donated ten paintings by Sergei I. Osipov with characteristic views of ancient Russian cities and architectural monuments to the Yamalo-Nenets Museum and Exhibition Complex named after I. S. Shemanovsky (Salekhard).

In 2017, painting Autumn Branch (1974) by Sergei Osipov appeared in the TV series CHANCE shot by 20 Century Fox Film Corporation based on the novel of the same name by American novelist Kem Nunn, commissioned by American video streaming service Hulu with popular English actor Hugh Laurie in the title role. In the final two episodes of the thriller ("A Madness of Two", and "Especially If You Run Away") written by Kem Nunn the painting Autumn Branch by Sergei Osipov is shown in the interior of the house of the protagonist Dr. Eldon Chance, played by Hugh Laurie. Against the background of the painting, which plays a plot-forming role in these scenes, key dramatic dialogues unfold with the participation of the main characters of the film.

A significant place was given to the paintings of Sergei Osipov in the books "Unknown Socialist Realism. Leningrad School" (2007) and "Leningrad School of Painting. Essays on History" (2019), published in Russian and English and dedicated to leading masters of the Leningrad School of Painting.

== See also ==
- Cornflowers (painting)
- House with Arch (painting)
- Fine Art of Leningrad
- Leningrad School of Painting
- List of the Russian Landscape painters
- Saint Petersburg Union of Artists

== Bibliography ==
- Центральный Государственный Архив литературы и искусства. СПб. Ф.78. Оп.8. Д.123.
- Выставка произведений ленинградских художников 1947 года. Каталог. Л., ЛССХ, 1948.
- Выставка произведений ленинградских художников 1950 года. Каталог. М.-Л., Искусство, 1951. С.19.
- Выставка произведений ленинградских художников 1951 года. Каталог. Л., Лениздат, 1951. С.15.
- Весенняя выставка произведений ленинградских художников 1954 года. Каталог. Л., Изогиз, 1954. С.15.
- Весенняя выставка произведений ленинградских художников 1955 года. Каталог. Л., ЛССХ, 1956. С.14.
- Осенняя выставка произведений ленинградских художников 1956 года. Каталог. Л., Ленинградский художник, 1958. С.18.
- 1917–1957. Выставка произведений ленинградских художников. Каталог. Л., Ленинградский художник, 1958. С.23.
- Осенняя выставка произведений ленинградских художников 1958 года. Каталог. Л., Художник РСФСР, 1959. С.20.
- Выставка произведений ленинградских художников 1960 года. Каталог. Л., Художник РСФСР, 1963. С.14.
- Выставка произведений ленинградских художников 1960 года. Каталог. Л., Художник РСФСР, 1961. С.30.
- Выставка произведений ленинградских художников 1961 года. Каталог. Л., Художник РСФСР, 1964. С.30.
- Осенняя выставка произведений ленинградских художников 1962 года. Каталог. Л., Художник РСФСР, 1962. С.20.
- Ленинград. Зональная выставка 1964 года. Каталог. Л, Художник РСФСР, 1965. C.38.
- Каталог весенней выставки произведений ленинградских художников 1965 года. Л., Художник РСФСР, 1970. С.23.
- Третья республиканская художественная выставка Советская Россия. Каталог. М., Министерство культуры РСФСР, 1967. С.42.
- Дмитренко А. О времени, о человеке... // Смена, 1967, 11 ноября.
- Арбузов Г. История на полотнах // Ленинградская правда, 1967, 12 декабря.
- Осенняя выставка произведений ленинградских художников 1968 года. Каталог. Л., Художник РСФСР, 1971. С.12.
- Каталог произведений художников Российской Федерации, переданных в дар организациям и учреждениям культуры (1963–1971 гг.). М., СХ РСФСР, 1972. С.76-77.
- По родной стране. Выставка произведений художников Ленинграда. 50-Летию образования СССР посвящается. Каталог. Л., Художник РСФСР, 1974. С.19.
- Наш современник. Выставка произведений ленинградских художников 1972 года. Каталог Л., Художник РСФСР, 1973. С.9.
- Натюрморт. Выставка произведений ленинградских художников. Каталог. Л., Художник РСФСР, 1973. С.11.
- Выставки советского изобразительного искусства. Справочник. Т.3. 1941–1947 гг. М., Советский художник, 1973. С.342.
- Наш современник. Зональная выставка произведений ленинградских художников 1975 года. Каталог. Л., Художник РСФСР, 1980. C.21.
- Изобразительное искусство Ленинграда. Каталог выставки. Л., Художник РСФСР, 1976. C.25.
- Семенов А. Н., Осипов С. И., Гущин К. А. Каталог выставки произведений. Автор вступ. статьи Г. Ф. Голенький. Л., Художник РСФСР, 1977.
- Выставка произведений ленинградских художников, посвящённая 60-летию Великого Октября. Л., Художник РСФСР, 1982. С.18.
- Справочник членов Союза художников СССР. Т.2. М., Советский художник, 1979. С.163.
- Зональная выставка произведений ленинградских художников 1980 года. Каталог. Л., Художник РСФСР, 1983. C.19.
- Выставки советского изобразительного искусства. Справочник. Т.5. 1954–1958 гг. М., Советский художник, 1981. С.25, 142, 259, 261, 386, 549.
- Леняшин В. Поиски художественной правды // Художник. 1981, No. 1. С.8-17.
- Выставка произведений художников — ветеранов Великой Отечественной войны. Л., ЛОСХ РСФСР, 1981. С.3.
- Сергей Осипов. Живопись. Рисунок. Каталог. М., Советский художник, 1983.
- Справочник членов Ленинградской организации Союза художников РСФСР. Л., Художник РСФСР, 1987. С.89.
- Сергей Иванович Осипов. Живопись. Рисунок. Выставка произведений. Каталог. Л., Художник РСФСР, 1990.
- Выставка произведений художников — ветеранов Великой Отечественной войны. Каталог. Л., Художник РСФСР, 1990. С.12.
- Ленинградские художники. Живопись 1950–1980 годов. Каталог СПб., 1994. С.4.
- Этюд в творчестве ленинградских художников. Выставка произведений. Каталог. СПб., 1994. С.5.
- Русская зима. Живопись. Выставка произведений петербургских художников. СПб., 1995. С.5.
- Лирика в произведениях художников военного поколения. Выставка произведений. Каталог. СПб., 1995. С.5.
- Живопись 1940–1990 годов. Ленинградская школа. Выставка произведений. СПб., 1996. С.5.
- Натюрморт в живописи 1940–1990 годов. Ленинградская школа. Каталог выставки. СПб., 1997. С.4.
- Matthew C. Bown. Dictionary of 20th Century Russian and Soviet Painters 1900-1980s. - London: Izomar, 1998. ISBN 0-9532061-0-6, ISBN 978-0-9532061-0-0.
- Мы помним... Художники, искусствоведы — участники Великой Отечественной войны. М., Союз художников России, 2000. С.208.
- Sergei V. Ivanov. Unknown Socialist Realism. The Leningrad School. Saint Petersburg, NP-Print Edition, 2007. P.9, 15, 18, 20, 21, 23, 24, 27–31, 36–37, 63, 76, 77, 86, 87, 95, 107, 108, 125, 159, 217, 367, 387–406, 414–423, 443–445. ISBN 5-901724-21-6, ISBN 978-5-901724-21-7.
- Юбилейный Справочник выпускников Санкт-Петербургского академического института живописи, скульптуры и архитектуры имени И. Е. Репина Российской Академии художеств. 1915–2005. СПб., Первоцвет, 2007. С.56.
- Иванов С. В. Двадцать лет спустя. Размышления о выставке Сергея Осипова.//Петербургские искусствоведческие тетради. Вып. 21. СПб, 2011. С. 25–31.
- 60 Лет кафедре общей живописи Санкт-Петербургской государственной художественно-промышленной академии имени А. Л. Штиглица. Каталог выставки. СПб, 2011. С.20, 21, 82.
- Иванов С. Тихая жизнь за ленинградским столом // Петербургские искусствоведческие тетради. Выпуск 23. СПб., 2012. С.90-97.
- Логвинова Е. Круглый стол по ленинградскому искусству в галерее АРКА // Петербургские искусствоведческие тетради. Вып. 31. СПб, 2014. С.17-26.
- Махлина С. Т. Осипов Сергей Иванович //Страницы памяти. Справочно-биографический сборник. 1941–1945. Художники Санкт-Петербургского (Ленинградского) Союза художников — ветераны Великой Отечественной войны. Кн.2. СПб, Петрополис, 2014. С.156-158.
- Sergei V. Ivanov. The Leningrad School of Painting. Essays on the History. St Petersburg, ARKA Gallery Publishing, 2019.
