= Katya Medvedeva =

Russian naïve painter (born 1937)

Katya Ivanovna Medvedeva (Russian: Екатери́на Ива́новна Медве́дева Ekaterina Ivanovna Medvedeva; born 1937) is a Russian naïve painter.

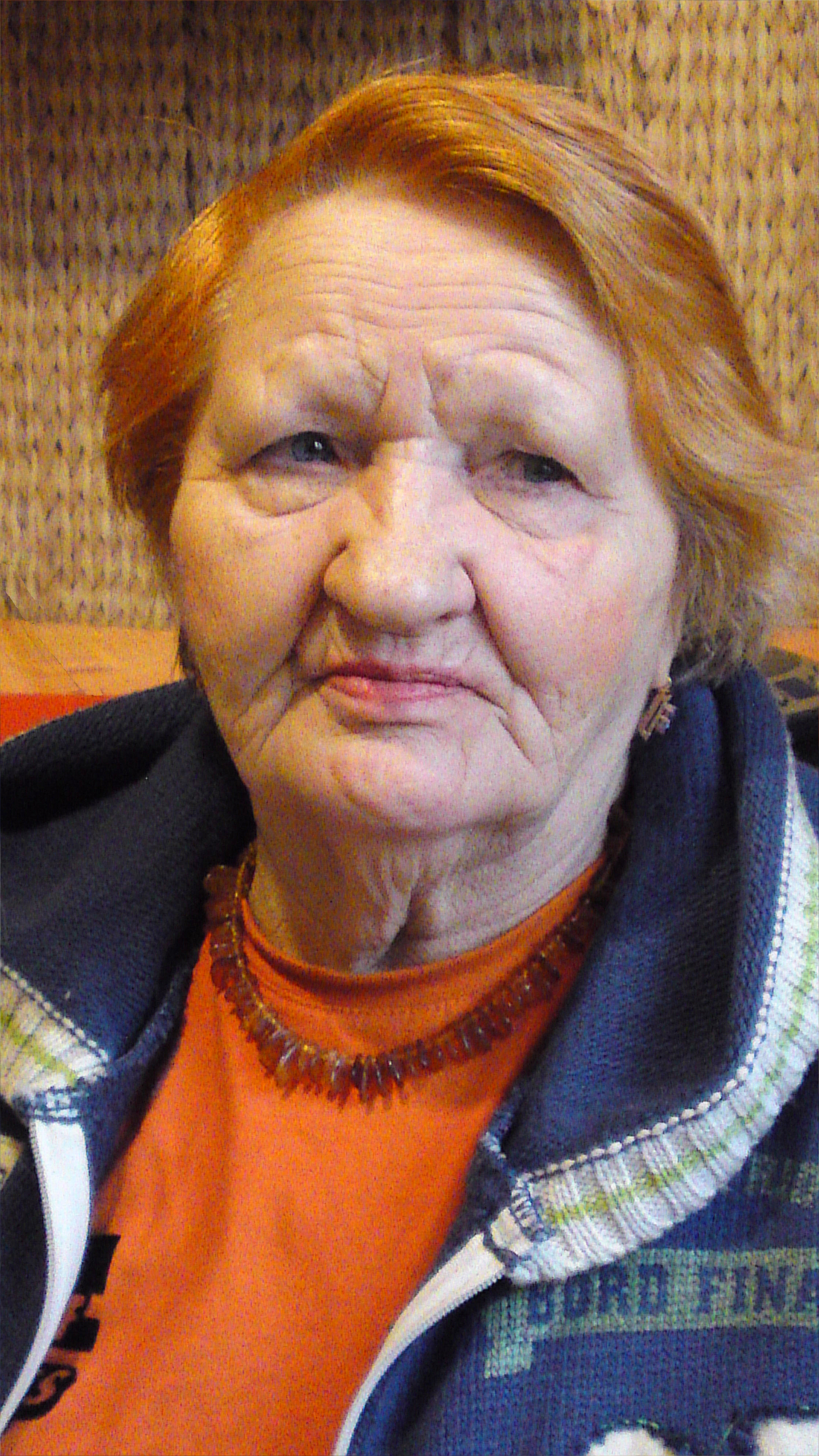
Katya Medvedeva, a Russian naïve painter

== Biography ==
Yekaterina (Katya) Medvedeva was born January 10, 1937, in the village Golubino of Novooskolsky District in Belgorod Oblast into a peasant family. Her parents died of starvation in 1947, when she was nine years old, and she was brought up in the Shusha's orphanage of the Nagorno-Karabakh autonomous region Azerbaijan SSR.

In her life, she worked at many different jobs, including: a waitress, postwoman, weaver, teacher, costume designer.

In 1976 (aged 39), by chance, she observed a painting class in an arts studio and decided to paint herself, with prolific output. Her paintings were soon recognised by art critics and she began to have exhibitions. Her works are now in public and private collections.

== Exhibitions ==
Moscow, Kislovodsk, Belgorod, St. Petersburg, Cheboksary, Aged Ladoga, New Oskol, Stary Oskol, Ivangorod (all - Russia). Paris, Nice (France). Darmstadt, Berlin, Mainz (Germany). Chicago, New York City (USA). Copenhagen (Denmark), Stockholm (Sweden), Helsinki (Finland), Prague (Czech Republic).

- 1976 First solo show (Russia)
- 1979 Regional exhibition of amateur artists in Belgorod, (Russia)
- 1981 Solo show at the All-Russian folk Art House, Moscow (Russia)
- 1993 Solo show at the Avenue des Champs-Élysées, Paris (France)
- 1994 An exhibition together with Marc Chagall, Matisse and Konysheva Natta in Nice (France)
- 2004 Solo show "My soul - Painting" from private collections, collections of the Museum-Reserve "Tsaritsyno" and the Russian House of Folk Art (Museum of Private Collections of the Pushkin Museum of Fine Arts), Moscow (Russia)
- 2005 The Bolshoi Theatre. M’Ars Centre for Contemporary Arts, Moscow (Russia)
- 2005 "Doubts of Beauty" - T.A. Mavrina, Katya Medvedeva. Painting & Graphics at the State Pushkin Museum, Moscow (Russia)
- 2006 Painting and Graphic Art 30th Anniversary of the Artist′s Oeuvre. The State Russian Museum, St. Petersburg (Russia)
- 2006 Solo show at the Vologda State Historical-Architectural and Art Museum-Reserve, Vologda (Russia)
- 2008 The Generous Pancake week. The Art-Soyuz Gallery at the Central House of Artist, Moscow (Russia)
- 2008 Paintings, Drawings and DolIs of Katya Medvedeva. Art Center Berlin (Germany)
- 2009 12 good art work "Saint George and the Dragon", Gallery A3, Moscow (Russia)

== Artistic album ==
- 2005 My soul - Painting: Album Catalog Publ. Red Square, ISBN 9785900743769 (Russian Federation Ministry of Culture, The Pushkin Museum of Fine Arts), Moscow (Russia).
