= Dmitri Plavinsky =

- Born: Dmitri Petrovich Plavinsky; 28 April 1937; Moscow, USSR
- Died: 1 September 2012 (aged 75); Moscow, Russia
- Known for: painting, drawing, graphics

Dmitri Plavinsky (Russian: Дмитрий Петрович Плавинский) (28 April 1937 – 1 September 2012) was a Russian-American artist.

== Life ==
In 1956, Plavinsky graduated from the theater department of the 1905 Institute of Art. In the 1960s, Plavinsky became one of the founders and leaders of the artistic nonconformist movement in Russia.

Because of his controversial and revolutionary creative output, he was not permitted to join the Moscow Union of Artists—a necessity in order to "officially" work as an artist, sell art, and have a studio under Soviet mandate—until many years later in 1978.

Avoiding the difficult post-Perestroika years, the artist moved to New York City in 1992. In 2004, he returned to reside and work in Moscow.

His art works are in the collections of several American museums, including the Metropolitan Museum of Art and the Museum of Modern Art in New York, as well as major museums in Russia and Europe.

== Style ==
An active member of the nonconformist art community in the Soviet Union, Plavinsky mastered various mediums including painting, etchings, and mixed media.

Plavinsky's artistic themes ranged from origins on earth of the prototypes of fish, reptiles, and other prehistoric animals; to the genesis of primeval cultures, ancient and early Christian states, and the computer era of the twenty-first century. Many of his later works utilized symbols of the City of New York.

The artist defined his artistic style as one of "Structural Symbolism," in which the unified image of the world is broken down into sequences of symbols submerged in the layers of time: past, present, and future.

== Selected Public collections ==
Plavinsky works are in the many museum and public collections, including: The Metropolitan Museum of Art, New York; The Museum of Modern Art, New York; New York Public Library, New York; Jane Voorhees Zimmerli Art Museum, The Norton and Nancy Dodge Collection of Nonconformist Art from the Soviet Union, Rutgers University, New Brunswick, New Jersey; Nasher Museum of Art at Duke University, Durham, North Carolina, USA; Ludwig Museum, Cologne, Germany; The State Tretyakov Gallery, Moscow; The State Pushkin Fine Arts Museum, Moscow; The State Russian Museum, St. Petersburg; District Museum in Torun, Poland; Kolodzei Art Foundation, USA, Tsukanov Art Collection; the Ekaterina Cultural Foundation, Moscow.

== Major exhibitions ==
Since 1957, Plavinsky participated in over a hundred group exhibitions in museums and galleries around the world.

Plavinsky had many solo exhibitions, including:

- Dmitri Plavinsky: A Retrospective at the State Tretyakov Gallery in 2004
- Dmitri Plavinsky: Book of Grass at The Pushkin State Museum of Fine Arts, Moscow in 2015

== Bibliography ==
- Bowlt, John E.; Jakimovich, Alexander. Dmitri Plavinsky. New York: Rizzoli Publishers, 2001. ISBN 0-8478-2315-6
