= Cornflowers (painting) =

1976 painting by Sergei Ivanovich Osipov

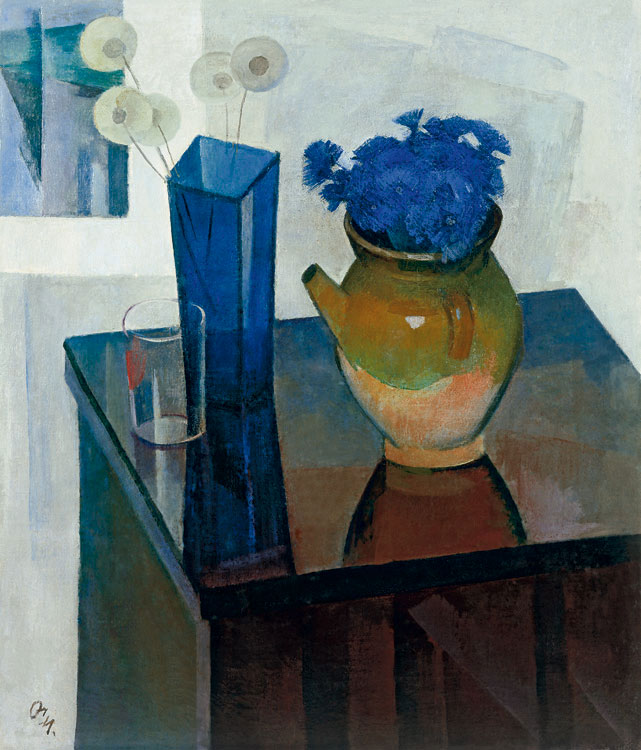
- Artist: Sergei Ivanovich Osipov
- Year: 1976
- Medium: Oil on canvas
- Dimensions: 70 cm × 60 cm (28 in × 24 in)
- Location: private collection, Russia

Cornflowers is an oil-on-canvas painting by the Russian artist Sergei Ivanovich Osipov (1915–1985), executed in 1976 and related to his most famous works in the genre of still life.

== History ==
Cornflowers is a laconic composition of three items displayed on the surface of a table. This allowed the artist to effectively describe their shape, texture and color properties. In this work, Osipov reaches a new quality of painting. The polished surface of the table from which the artist took off the cloth gives the composition of the picture more depth. Osipov was able to raise a great theme in the genre of still life and make it close and understandable to viewers. This picture revealed an artistic style that distinguishes his work, and in the words of Nikolai Punin, can be called the "Leningrad sensation of painting... with a kind of deeply honest, clean person deep relationship to the means of expression."

The painting was first exhibited in 1980 in Leningrad at the largest Regional Art Show in the Manezh City Exhibition Hall. Then, in 1983, it was shown in Moscow at the Osipov one man exhibition and reproduced in the exhibition catalog. The article wrote the Leningrad art critics Alexander Lyakhovitsky and Svetlana Makhlina. After Osipov’s death the painting was shown in his solo exhibition in 1991 at the Exhibition Halls of the Leningrad Union of Artists.

In 1997 the painting was included in the exhibition Still-life painting of 1940-1990s – The Leningrad School in Saint Petersburg in the Nikolai Nekrasov Memorial Museum. The painting was reproduced and described in the official catalog and poster. In 2007 Cornflowers was reproduced and described among 350 art works by Leningrad artists in the book Unknown Socialist Realism: The Leningrad School, published in Russian and English. In 2011 the painting was described in an article devoted to the 20th Anniversary of Sergei Osipov one man exhibition of 1991, printed in St. Petersburg art history notebooks.

== See also ==
- House with Arch painting
- Leningrad School of Painting

== Sources ==
- Artists Arseny N. Semionov, Sergei I. Osipov, Kirill A. Guschin. Exhibition catalogue. - Leningrad: Khudozhnik RSFSR, 1977.
- Regional Exhibition of works by Leningrad artists of 1980. Exhibition catalogue. - Leningrad: Khudozhnik RSFSR, 1983. P. 19.
- Sergei Ivanovich Osipov. Painting. Drawing. Exhibition catalogue. — Moscow: Soviet Artist, 1983. P. 25, 32.
- Directory of members of the Leningrad branch of Union of Artists of Russian Federation. - Leningrad: Khudozhnik RSFSR, 1980. - p. 89.
- Sergei Ivanovich Osipov (1915 - 1985). Painting. Drawing. Exhibition catalogue. — Leningrad: Khudozhnik RSFSR, 1990.
- The Still-life painting of 1940-1990s. The Leningrad School. Exhibition catalogue. — Saint Petersburg, Nikolai Nekrasov Memorial museum, 1997. P. 4.
- Matthew C. Bown. Dictionary of 20th Century Russian and Soviet Painters 1900-1980s. - London: Izomar, 1998. ISBN 0-9532061-0-6, ISBN 978-0-9532061-0-0.
- Sergei V. Ivanov. Unknown Socialist Realism. The Leningrad School.- Saint Petersburg: NP-Print Edition, 2007. – P. 95. ISBN 5-901724-21-6, ISBN 978-5-901724-21-7.
- Pages of the Memory. Reference Memorial digest. Artists of the Leningrad Union of Soviet artists, who were killed during the Great Patriotic War and the Siege of Leningrad. St. Petersburg, 2010. P. 67.
- Иванов С. В. Двадцать лет спустя. Размышления о выставке Сергея Осипова.//Петербургские искусствоведческие тетради. Вып. 21. СПб, 2011. С. 25-31.
- 60 Лет кафедре общей живописи Санкт-Петербургской государственной художественно-промышленной академии имени А. Л. Штиглица. Каталог выставки. СПб, 2011. С.20.
- Иванов С. Тихая жизнь за ленинградским столом // Петербургские искусствоведческие тетради. Выпуск 23. СПб., 2012. С.90-97.
