= Natta Konysheva =

Russian artist (1935–2022)

- Born: Natta Ivanovna Konysheva; 9 June 1935; Moscow, Russian SFSR, USSR
- Died: 16 March 2022 (aged 86); Moscow, Russia
- Education: 1959 graduated from Moscow Polygraphists Institute
- Known for: Painter
- Movement: reportage with miracle elements, genre painting, family portraits
- Awards: Main Prize Laureate of the "Spring Saloon-98" – creative contest for women artists in Russia. Culture Ministry of the Russian Federation Medalist in 2000. Laureate of the Victor Popkov Contest (the second degree) in 2008.

Natta Ivanovna Konysheva (Russian: Натта Ивановна Конышева; 9 June 1935 – 16 March 2022) was a Russian painter.

== Biography ==
In 1959 Konysheva graduated from Moscow Polygraphists Institute. She has participated in the exhibitions since 1965.

From 1960 to 1970 she worked in industrial graphic design. She illustrated and designed books for the following publishing houses: Sovetsky Pisatel, Geographizdat, Altaisky publishing house.

In 1974 Konysheva joined MSKh (Moscow Painters Organization).

A member of Women Artists Association "IRIDA".

She started from participation in the apartment’s views and rare semi-permitted shows in the large scale exhibitions. She is promoting her method of art as "reportage with miracle elements".

Konysheva's personal exhibitions were held in Moscow, Russia (1974, 1987, 1988, 2005, 2008) and in France (1988, 1994).

== Artist about his credo ==
- At the opening of the art exhibition "From Repin up to the avant-garde" on 28 September 2009 in the Institute of Restoration: "Yes, I’m common as everybody, nothing special, I’m treading the ground. Workaholic. More carpenter than painter." (VESTI-MOSCOW 29.09.09 21:31).

== Albums ==
- 1988 "Catalogue. Natta Konysheva. Painting." Introduction article by Meiland, Viliam Leonidovich. Moscow Association of Artists in RSFSR Publ. Изд. «Sovetsky hudozhnik», Moscow (Russia).
- 2006 "Time of changes. 1960-1985 Art in the USSR." Interactive program. Information Centre "Russian museum: virtual branch", Saint-Petersburg (Russia).
- 2007 "Natta Konysheva. Painting." Publ. "Richard Cash Publishers", Moscow (Russia).

== Articles ==
- 2000 Leonid Lerner. "NATA from Kilerov Tupik" Journal "Ogon'ek".
- 2001 Meiland, Viliam Leonidovich. "Natta Konysheva Span Gold." Journal "So – Obsh’eniye".
- 2005 Velimir Moist. "Legend in gumshoes" Web-site Gazeta.ru
- 2005 Igor Chuvilin. "Put down" Web-site ANO "Editors of Daily NEWSPAPER"
- 2008 Dmitry Shirokov. "Natta Konysheva: thirty thousand paintings and one book." Web-site Polit.ru

== Works in Collections ==
- State Russian Museum. Saint-Petersburg. Russia.
- Jane Vorhees Zimmerli Art Museum, Rutgers University. New Brunswick. New Jersey. United States.
- Bryansk Art Museum. Bryansk. Russia.
- Contemporary Art Museum ART4.RU.Moscow. Russia.
- Gregory Gallery – New York City. United States.
- Kovalsky Art Gallery. Palo Alto, CA. United States.
- René Guerra Collection. Paris. France.
- The Kolodzei Collection of Russian and Eastern European Art, Kolodzei Art Foundation. Highland Park, NJ. United States
- VArt Collection. Moscow. Russia.

== Exhibitions ==
- ........................................
- 1994 An exhibition together with Marc Chagall, Matisse and Katya Medvedeva in Nice. France
- 1995 /+ by -/ An exhibition together with Victor Krotov . Central House of Artists. Moscow. Russia
- 2005 Natta Konysheva World and we are in it. Central House of Artists. Moscow. Russia
- 2008 Natta Konysheva and Oleg Sergeev. Painting. Moscow. Moscow Commonwealth of Artists (‘MSKh’) Painters association. Exhibition Hall on 1st Tverskaya-Yamskaya, 20.Moscow. Russia
