= Manege Affair =

Political incident involving Nikita Khrushchev's review of an art exhibition

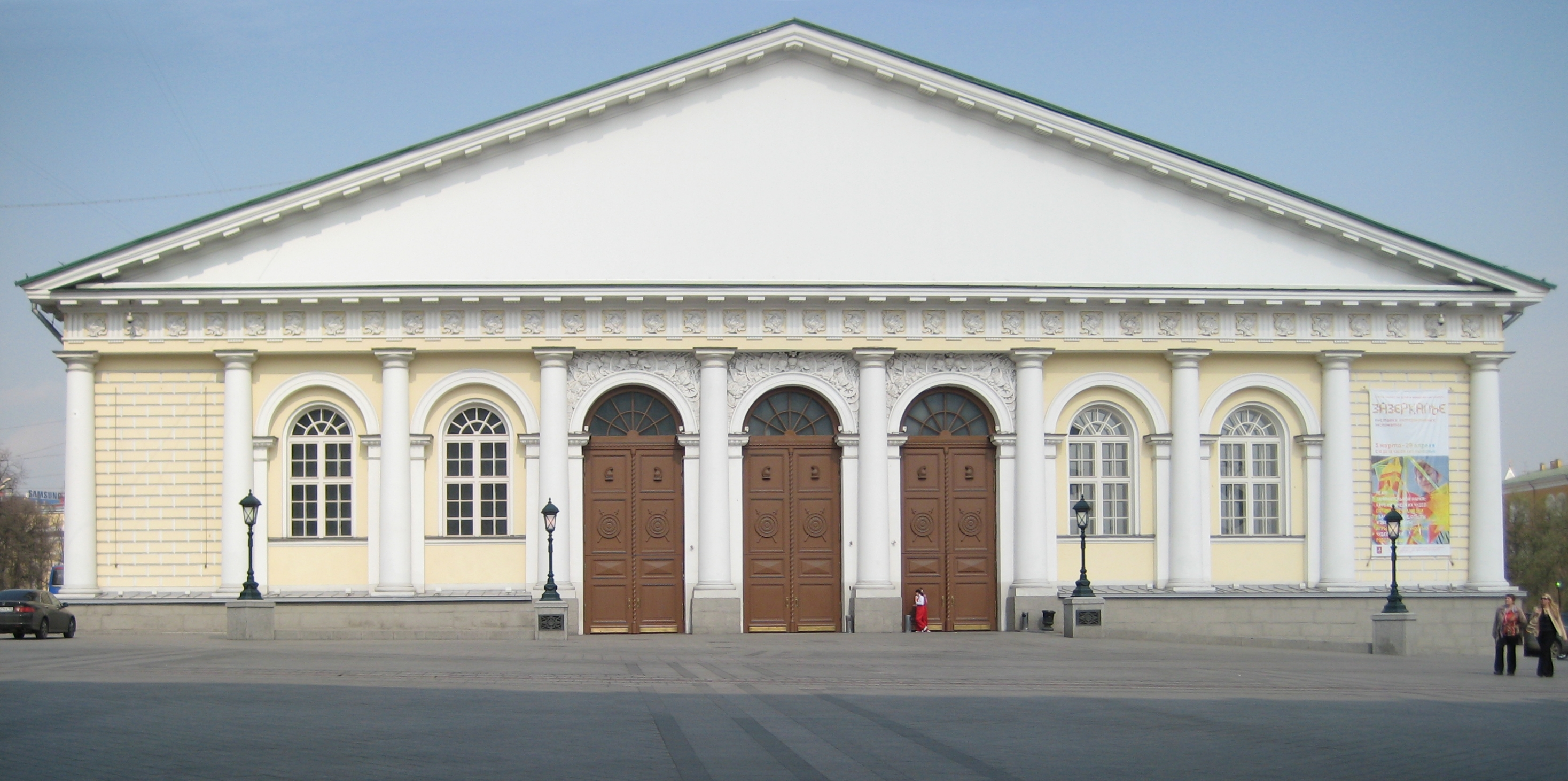
Moscow Manege

The Manege Affair was an episode when Nikita Khrushchev together with other Party leadership visited an anniversary art exhibition "30 Years of the Moscow Artists' Union" at Moscow Manege on December 1, 1962. It resulted in Khruschev's angry rant against "filth, decadence and sexual deviations" he saw along with the traditional works of Socialist Realism. After the visit, he arranged a campaign to tighten the grip of the Party over culture. This has been described as the beginning of the end of the Cultural Thaw in the Soviet Union. The episode is covered in detail in the book Unofficial Art in the Soviet Union by Paul Sjeklocha and Igor Mead and in other publications.

== Individual encounters ==
Speaking to Ely Bielutin, the exhibition host, Khrushchev said:

Don't you know how to paint? My grandson will paint it better! What is this? Are you men or damned pederasts!? How can you paint like that? Do you have a conscience? That's it, Belyutin, I'm telling you as the Chairman of the Council of Ministers: The Soviet people don't need all this. I'm telling you! Forbid! Prohibit everything! Stop this mess! I order! I say! And check everything! On the radio, on television, and in print, uproot all sympathizers of this!

Ülo Sooster's widow narrated:

"Khrushchev walked around the room, went up to Yulo's blue painting and asked: "What is this?" "A lunar landscape," Yulo answered. "Have you been there, asshole?" Khrushchev began to yell wildly. And Yulo answered: "That's how I imagine it." "I'll send you to the West, formalist, no, no, I'll deport you, no, I'll send you to a camp!" Khrushchev continued to rage. And Yulo answered: "I've already been there." Then Khrushchev said that no, he wouldn't deport him, but he would re-educate him."

From many memoirs there is an impression that Khrushchev genuinely believed that it was an exhibition of homosexuals (who were criminalized in the Soviet Union). A well-known example from the recollections of Ernst Neizvestny: Khrushchev asked Ernst: "Are you a pidaras (faggot)?" Ernst retorted, no, just give me a girl and I will show you. It looked like Khrushchev liked this answer.

== See also ==
- Bulldozer Exhibition
- Socialist realism
