= Staritsa =

Staritsa (Russian: Старица) is the name of several inhabited localities in Russia.

== Modern localities ==
Urban localities

- Staritsa (town), Tver Oblast, a town in Staritsky District of Tver Oblast

Rural localities

- Staritsa, Astrakhan Oblast, a selo in Staritsky Selsoviet of Chernoyarsky District in Astrakhan Oblast; 48°13′N 45°56′E
- Staritsa, Kaluga Oblast, a village in Ulyanovsky District of Kaluga Oblast
- Staritsa, Kirov Oblast, a selo in Yumsky Rural Okrug of Svechinsky District in Kirov Oblast; 58°38′N 47°36′E
- Staritsa, Novgorod Oblast, a village in Velilskoye Settlement of Maryovsky District in Novgorod Oblast
- Staritsa, Orenburg Oblast, a selo in Krasnouralsky Selsoviet of Orenburgsky District in Orenburg Oblast
- Staritsa, Oryol Oblast, a settlement in Novosinetsky Selsoviet of Bolkhovsky District in Oryol Oblast
- Staritsa, Tambov Oblast, a settlement in Maryinsky Selsoviet of Kirsanovsky District in Tambov Oblast
- Staritsa, Tomsk Oblast, a selo in Parabelsky District of Tomsk Oblast
- Staritsa (rural locality), Tver Oblast, a station in Staritsa Rural Settlement of Staritsky District in Tver Oblast

== Alternative names ==
- Staritsa, alternative name of Staritsy, a village in Sabskoye Settlement Municipal Formation of Volosovsky District in Leningrad Oblast; 59°4′N 29°31′E
