= Abstractionism =

Theory of how human minds form concepts

Abstractionism is the theory that the mind obtains some or all of its concepts by abstracting them from concepts it already has, or from experience. One may, for example, abstract 'green' from a set of experiences which involve green along with other properties. Also, for example, one may abstract a generic concept like 'vegetable' from the already possessed concepts of its instances (carrot, broccoli, onion, etc). This view was criticized by George Berkeley and Peter Geach.

== History ==
Abstractionism has its roots in Aristotle's writings, particularly those rejecting the Platonic theory of Forms. They were adopted and developed further by the Scholastics so that the doctrine became entrenched in the seventeenth century. John Locke also developed his own theory of abstract ideas, although it was against the Scholastic theory of essences. For him, ideas originate in sensory experience, which provides the basis for forming general ideas about classes of things. His theory contradicts the empiricist standpoint due to its focus on intuitive and demonstrative knowledge, as demonstrated in Locke's recognition that pure mathematics and pure morals are founded on intuition and demonstration.

There are several modern versions of abstractionism, and these include those developed by theorists such as Noam Chomsky and Jerry Fodor, who proposed that concepts are preformed at birth and that we learn to match the words of our language onto the pre-existing concepts. Chomsky, for instance, explained the "deep structure" of the Internet or the grammar of meaning hidden beneath the surface of words by citing that "linguists isolate from an essentially heterogeneous linguistic reality a standard and homogeneous system, thus grounding abstraction."

Berkeley's opposition to abstractionism is considered to be primarily directed at Locke's claim that words are made general through the mediation of general ideas. This is due to the view that Locke's argument is tantamount to claiming that the word "triangle" can be applied to many different triangles because the abstract general idea of the form is used as a template or standard when identifying new instances as being of the same sort.
