= Moscow Manege =

Design and art museum in the Russian capital

Coordinates: 55°45′12″N 37°36′44″E

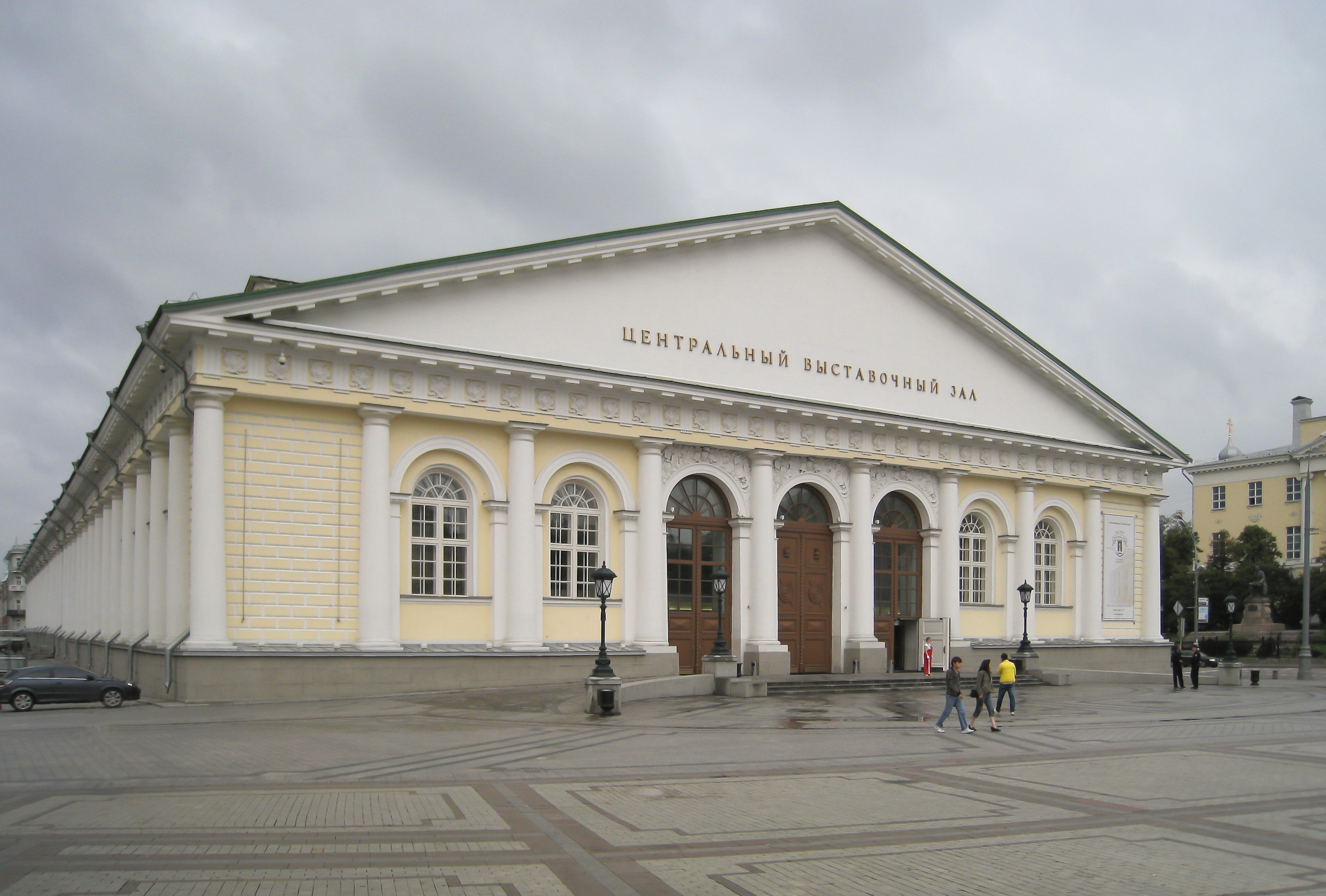
Moscow Manege

The Moscow Manege (Russian: Мане́ж, IPA: [mɐˈnʲeʂ]) is an oblong building along the west side of Manege Square, which was cleared in the 1930s and lies adjacent to Red Square. It is the site of Moscow Design Museum since 2012.

Designed by Spanish engineer Agustín de Betancourt with a roof without internal support for 45 metres (148 ft) (the building's width), it was erected from 1817 to 1825 by the Russian architect Joseph Bové, who clothed it in its Neoclassical exterior, an order of Roman Doric columns enclosing bays of arch-headed windows in a blind arcade, painted white and cream yellow. The roof, with its internal rafters and beams exposed, rests on external columns of the Manege.

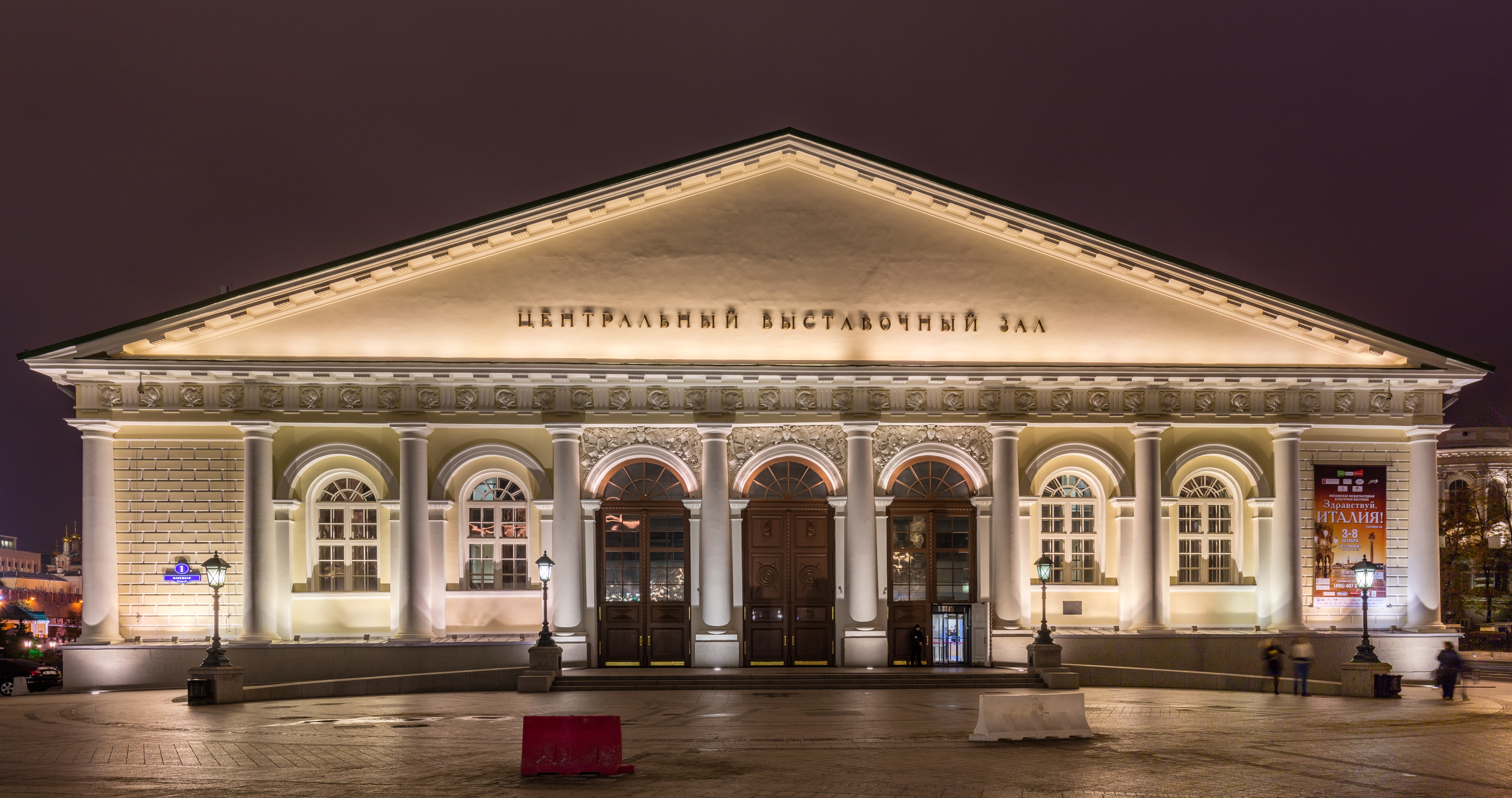
Night view.

The structure was used first as a traditional manège, an indoor riding academy, to house parades of horsemen and a training school for officers. The 180 metres (590 ft) long Manege was large enough to hold an entire infantry regiment—over two thousand soldiers—as well as an invited audience. Since 1831 it has been an exhibition place. In 1867, Hector Berlioz and Nikolai Rubinstein performed at the Manege before a crowd of 12,000. During the Soviet years, the building was used as an art gallery. It was there that Nikita Khrushchev chided avant-garde artists for promoting degenerate art, an episode known as the Manege Affair.

== 2004 fire ==
On 14 March 2004, the night of a Russian presidential election in which Vladimir Putin was overwhelmingly re-elected for a second four-year term, the building caught fire and burnt down, killing two firefighters. The wooden beams and rafters collapsed, leaving the walls remaining on site. The official investigation concluded that a short circuit caused the fire, though there was media speculation that a fire at such a historic building, only a stone's throw from the Kremlin, on the night of a presidential election, may not have been coincidental. On 18 February 2005 the restored Manege resumed its operation as an exhibition hall by mounting the same exposition that had been scheduled for the day of the fire.

== Description and architectural features ==
The Rectangular in plan one-storey building of the Moscow Manege is an example of Classicism architecture. The building was 166 m long, 44 m wide and about 15 m high. The original floor area of the Manege was 7,424.67 m ². The facades of the building have an arcade of seven arched apertures with semi-columns and are crowned with plain gables without decorations. The side walls are flanked by semi-columns of the Tuscan order, between which vaulted windows are placed in the arched openings. Under the gables of the facades as well as in the middle part of the side walls there are three wooden gates. The main facade was supposed to be the Southern one facing the Kutafya Tower - one of the four entrances to the Kremlin. The internal space of the Manege was well illuminated by the daylight owing to the windows which formed about one third of the area of the walls. The Manege's enlarged proportions, columns, pylons and restrained colour scheme underscore the monumentality of the building.

== See also ==
- The Manege Affair
- Saint Petersburg Manege
