= Daughter of Soviet Kirgizia =

1948 painting by Simion Chuykov

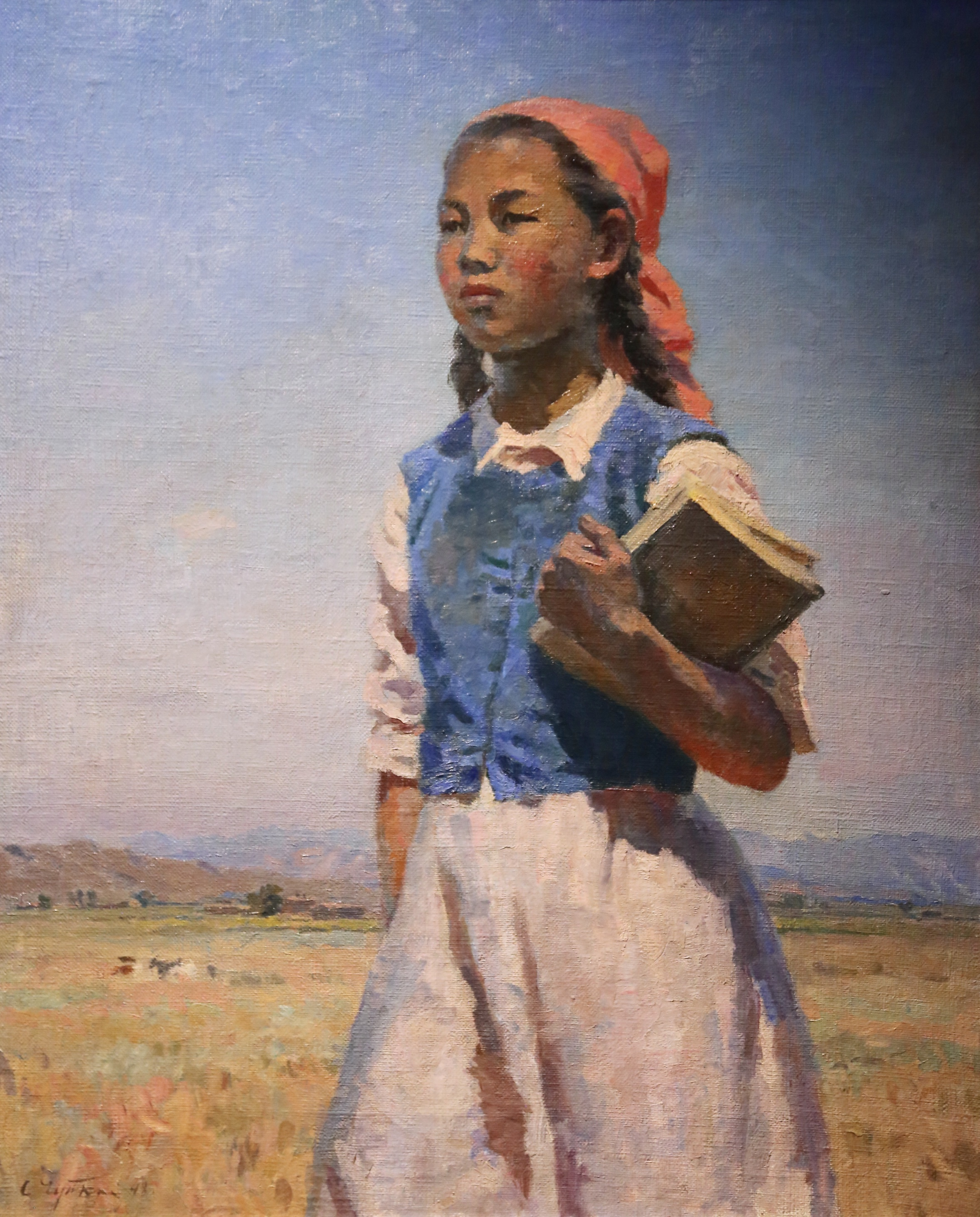
- Artist: Semyon Chuykov
- Year: 1948
- Medium: Oil on canvas
- Dimensions: 120 cm × 95,5 cm (47 in × 376 in)
- Location: State Tretyakov Gallery, Moscow

Daughter of Soviet Kirgizia (Russian: Дочь Советской Киргизии) is a painting by Soviet artist Semyon Chuykov. It is the final canvas of the series Kyrgyzia Collective Farm Suite (1939–1948), according to the author's plan, reflecting the changes in the life of Soviet Kyrgyzstan, that occurred in the 1930s and 1940s. According to art historians such as D. V. Sarabyanov, Daughter of Soviet Kirgizia plays a central role in the aforementioned series.

The painting is part of the collection of the State Tretyakov Gallery. As of 2012, it could be seen in the permanent exhibition of one of the Soviet painting halls of the New Tretyakov Gallery. The author's reproductions of the painting belong to the Gapar Aitiev Museum of Fine Arts in Bishkek and the National Museum of Art of Romania in Bucharest.

The painting has repeatedly been a representative of Soviet fine art at major exhibitions outside the USSR and the Russian Federation. At the 1958 World's Fair in Brussels, Daughter of Soviet Kirgizia was awarded a gold medal (along with another of Chuykov's paintings, Daughter of Shepherd).

== The painting's representation ==
A "sturdy, tanned girl" walks across the steppes of Kirgizia (art historian Jamal Umetalieva wrote of the slow, confident rhythm of the movement). Above her head is a high dome of blue sky, and on the horizon are purple mountains. The girl is wearing a light-coloured dress, a blue velvet sleeveless shirt, and a red kerchief. The sleeveless shirt casts blue reflections on the dress. Her face is calm and warm, rreflectint strict ideas of beauty. Black plaits frame her face with a high forehead. They fall down her back from under her headscarf.

The girl's silhouette stands out in relief against the landscape. The colour emphasises her unity with nature: the blue of the air is intensified in the bright blue of the heroine's blouse. Chuykov used a wide range of blues, reds and ochres and their various subtle combinations and proportions. The sun illuminates the girl's figure, her face and hands as well as the expansive steppe where she walks.

== Painting's history ==
Daughter of Soviet Kirgizia was painted in 1948. It is the final painting of the series Kyrgyzia Collective Farm Suite, begun in 1939 (Chuykov interrupted work on the serie during the World War II). (Note: Another dating of the beginning of Chuykov's work on the cycle is found in the thirteen-volume History of Russian Art. In it, the beginning of the work is counted from 1945, when the artist created the painting Song (currently in the Kharkiv Art Museum). Soviet art historian Polikarp Lebedev dated the artist's work on the cycle to 1947–1948.) Galina Leontyeva, who devoted a separate large article to the painting, referred to it as a culmination of the artist's entire series, “a symbol of the free East, awakened to an active, independent life”. In her opinion, the painting conveys “the image of a new man, his emerging character, the features of modern life in Kyrgyzstan...in the most concentrated, concise, and expressive form”.

According to the Soviet art historian Elena Zhidkova, Chuykov's originally intended five main paintings in the series Kyrgyzia Collective Farm Suite: Song, Morning, Noon, Evening, Youth (this was the title originally conceived by the artist for the future painting Daughter of Soviet Kyrgyzstan). The environment was to be landscapes and sketches of the artist's everyday impressions. In the series Kyrgyzia Collective Farm Suite, sketches, genre paintings (according to academician Dmitry Sarabyanov, they can be considered as such only conditionally, as they depict neither a specific event nor action), and landscapes coexist. Each painting can be simultaneously perceived as an independent artistic work. As noted by a contemporary historian of fine art, many paintings of this serie had everyday names as Morning, Noon, Evening, and were sketches of everyday life in Kyrgyz villages, and “to the practice of collective farm production had no more relation than Van Gogh’s The Red Vineyards in Arles or Vasnetsov's reapers”. Soviet art historian Anatoly Bogdanov wrote that the title of the series, however, was chosen consciously by the artist: he did not depict the dynamics of labor activity, but poetically interpreted its results. The paintings of the series create a broad panorama of life in the Soviet Republic, but in content and pictorial tasks they are different. This, according to Bogdanov, was due to the great importance of landscape in the paintings of the series — nature does not suppress man, but is in unity with the way of life, customs, and traditions of the people.

The original painting Daughter of Soviet Kyrgyzstan is currently in the collection of the State Tretyakov Gallery in Moscow. It is an oil painting on canvas, of 120 × 95.5 cm (according to the Soviet art historian Evelina Polishchuk, 120 × 95 cm). At the bottom left is the artist's signature and the date of the canvas's creation: S. Chuykov 1948. The painting was acquired by the Tretyakov Gallery from the artist himself in 1949.

Chuykov created the picture in the suburbs of the capital of Soviet Kyrgyzstan, Frunze (now Bishkek). He completed it in his studio, where now there is the Memorial House Museum of S. A. Chuykov (the charcoal portrait of Aizhamal Ogobaeva, the model for the painting, is in the exposition of the House Museum). Chuykov's goal was to create a collective image of a new society man. Researchers tell, that this time he did not create a large number of sketches for the canvas in the form of sketches and studies, although painstaking work on sketches, sketches, and composition was a feature of his creative method. (Note: Semyon Chuikov himself told about the need to strictly follow the rule to start with sketches, then move on to sketches, and only after that to take up the painting in the book The Artist's notes.) According to them, preparatory works for this painting were considered by Chuykov to be the paintings created in different years that depict Kyrgyz teenage girls: Girl with Cotton (1936), Girl with Sunflower (1939), and Girl with Book (1946). Galina Leontyeva explained this by stating that he worked for many years to create a “generalized, typical image”. All those paintings, according to her, are milestones on the way to creating the image of the girl from the canvas Daughter of Soviet Kyrgyzstan. Each painting contains features, that would be brought together in this final canvas. Chuykov did not limit himself to repetition of what he had already found: in every new painting, he honed the character of his heroine, “making it deeper and more multifaceted”.

Art historians note that one of the characteristics of Chuykov's work is the transfer of a single image from painting to painting, while perfecting it, polishing it, and making it more multifaceted until it is complete. One of the few known sketches for the painting is in the collection of the Perm State Art Gallery. Another sketch is mentioned in the catalogue of the artist's works by Dmitry Sarabyanov. It is executed in oil on cardboard in the format 34 × 26 cm. This study is in the collection of the Bulgarian National Art Gallery in Sofia. Another sketch from 1948 is listed on the website of the Ministry of Culture of the Russian Federation (Goskatalogue number 4071982). Painted in oil on cardboard, it measures 33 × 25 cm and is part of the collection of the Bryansk Regional Art Museum and Exhibition Centre (inv. Zh 847), and is kept in its archives. In the summer of 2007, as part of a project commemorating the 250th anniversary of the Russian Academy of Arts, the museum presented the sketch to a wide audience at one of the exhibitions of the series The 20th Century through the Eyes of the Artist.

Chuykov himself was very fond of the painting Daughter of Soviet Kyrgyzstan. Tatiana Popova, head of the painting department at the Gapar Aitiev Museum of Fine Arts, believes that for him, it was a symbol of the new life of the Kyrgyz people. In this painting, Chuykov presented his understanding of a new hero, a new man of his homeland, the personification of Soviet Kyrgyzstan.

=== The author's repetitions of the painting ===
External images
- | A study to the painting Daughter of Soviet Kirgizia, Bryansk Regional Art Museum and Exhibition Center, 1948
- | Daughter of Soviet Kyrgyzstan, Gapar Aitiev National Museum of Art, 1950 (author's reprint)

For the Gapar Aitiev National Museum of Art Chuykov made an author's copy (also 120 × 95.5 cm) in 1950. At present this is exhibited in the Simion Chuykov Hall of the same museum.

Another repetition of the painting Daughter of Soviet Kyrgizia, was created for the National Museum of Art of Romania in Budapest. The technique is oil painting on canvas, size: 120 × 95 cm. In a monograph on Chuykov's work, Academician of the Russian Academy of Sciences and Corresponding Member of the Russian Academy of Arts Dmitry Sarabyanov mentions this canvas twice, but does not date its execution. In Elena Zhidkova's catalogue it is dated 1951.

In December 2006, Kommersant Weekend magazine reported on another version of the painting, offered at the Half a Century of Soviet Art Auction in Moscow. Kommersant Weekend referred to the canvas as "the famous girl with books". The information was published that at the established preauction price of 16-20 thousand dollars, after a long rivalry between the buyer, who was present in the hall, and his competitor, who communicated with the auction staff by phone: the price rose to 85 thousand dollars. However, the official website of the SovCom Auction shows as lot number 45 a completely different painting with the same title (Daughter of Soviet Kyrgizia). It is from the 1940s, has a small format (47.5 × 31.5 cm), and is an oil painting on cardboard. The painting depicts a young woman smiling at the viewer, carrying on her left shoulder a basket filled to the brim with fruit. The catalog of the Museum of Russian Art in Minneapolis (USA), published in 2006, mentions a version of Chuykov's painting Daughter of Soviet Kirgizia (canvas, oil, 47 × 37 cm) made by the author. It had come from a private collection (when this happened is not stated in the catalogue). The creation of this version of the painting is dated 1950 in the catalogue.

=== Acknowledgment and awards ===
The Kyrgyzia Collective Farm Suite was dedicated to Simion Chuykov's personal exhibition in Moscow in 1948. The series (in the Decree of the Council of Ministers of the USSR "On Awarding Stalin Prizes for Outstanding Works in the Field of Art and Literature for 1948" it was called A Series of Paintings on the Collective Farms of Kyrgyzstan), which included the painting, was awarded the Stalin Prize of the second degree for 1948 (Chuykov received a large sum of money for that time, 50,000 rubles). Art critics and viewers immediately singled out Daughter of Soviet Kirgizia from the artist's series of paintings. They noted the beauty of the picture and the artistic skill of its execution.

The painting represented Soviet art at foreign exhibitions several times: in the German Democratic Republic (in Berlin and Dresden) at the exhibition of six academicians of the Academy of Arts of the USSR — Alexander Deineka, Nikolai Tomsky, Alexei Pakhomov, Georgy Vereisky, Geliy Korzhev and Simion Chuykov. In January 1965, the German newspaper Sächsische Zeitung wrote: "Chuykov is an exceptional painter... he vividly conveys the beauty of his homeland, the feelings and thoughts of the people he depicts... His people are full of peace, their charm of immediacy is so faithfully captured and reproduced that, for example, the painting Daughter of Soviet Kirgizia has become the personification of Soviet youth and its affirmation of life".

At the 1958 World Exhibition in Brussels, two of Chuykov's paintings, Daughter of Soviet Kirgizia and Shepherd's Daughter, were awarded the gold medal. Art historians noted that the paintings complement each other — in the painting Daughter of Soviet Kirgizia, Chuykov synthesizes socially significant features of the model, and in Shepherd's Daughter Chuykov "combines with deep generalization directly emotional impression of nature".

== The model ==
In several sketches, Chuykov's attention was drawn to the image of three Kyrgyz girls. The face of one of them, “full of inner concentration, lively spirit, and beautiful in its own way, especially attracted the artist's attention”. He was interested not so much in her appearance as in the possibilities that her “peculiar external and spiritual appearance” offered for the creation of a long-planned painting dedicated to Kyrgyz youth and completing the cycle.

The artist's model was a Kyrgyz girl from the village of Orto-Say, Aizhamal Ogobaeva. (The Kyrgyz art historian Jamal Umetalieva believes, that the artist did not aim for a portrait likeness and significantly departed from the girl's true appearance, making the image deeply national.) Talant Ogobayev, a close relative of Aizhamal who later became an artist himself, wrote that when Chuykov created his painting, the girl was 13 or 14 years old. Chuykov befriended Aizhamal and offered to take her with him to Moscow to get a good education. However, her mother opposed this and did not allow her to leave. Talant Ogobayev believed this was a wrong decision, as the girl missed a rare opportunity to significantly change her fate.

Aizhamal married her fellow villager Kamchybek Ogobayev. During World War II, Kamchybek Ogobayev took part in military operations against Japan as a cavalryman. After the war and demobilization, he worked as a gamekeeper in the Issyk-Ata reserve. Later he worked as a guard for the collective farm herd. Aizhamal Ogobaeva devoted herself to her family, doing the housework and bringing up her children. She had four children; one of her daughters died very young, but the other three lived long lives. Aizhamal herself died in her seventies. Chuykov maintained a friendly relationship with her for the rest of his life, often referring to her as his daughter.

Elena Zhidkova wrote in a monograph on the artist that he emphasised the characteristic features of his model, but that she "did not become the only muse for him". The image of the girl, according to Zhidkova, contains "the artist's personal idea of the ideal" and the features of many other models. The Soviet art historian and senior researcher at the Tretyakov Gallery, Evelina Polishchuk, argued that Chuykov's task in creating the picture did not involve psychological analysis or the transfer of a portrait's likeness. According to her, the heroine on Chuykov's canvas is a pictorial metaphor and is functionally close to Vera Mukhina's sculpture Worker and Kolkhoz Woman, a generalised national image that personifies the aspiration to the light of knowledge and a new life. Anatoly Bogdanov expressed a similar opinion.In his opinion, the first paintings of the Kyrgyz Collective Farm Suite are dominated by images of specific people with their individual appearances, so they can be considered portraits, although even in these Chuykov emphasises the most typical features, reflecting the signs of the times.In the paintings of the late 1940s, he emphasised active purposefulness and willfulness, giving the canvases a bourgeois orientation. In the painting Daughter of Soviet Kyrgyzstan, according to Bogdanov, Chuykov "achieved the unity of the individual and the typical, creating a magnificent portrait of a Kyrgyz schoolgirl in all the uniqueness of her human personality and inspired a poetic story about youth, happiness, and the generation of the young". For Polikarp Lebedev, corresponding member of the Academy of Arts of the USSR and long-time director of the Tretyakov Gallery, the girl in the painting is, in general, "a collective image of a Soviet person moving towards the bright goal – communism" and "a collective image that poetically celebrates the people of the 'small' nationalities of our motherland, liberated by the October Revolution".

== Artistic features and the artist's intention ==
The painting Daughter of Soviet Kirghizia was recommended during Soviet times as a visual aid in a high school history course to “reveal the enormous changes in the lives of the previously oppressed peoples of tsarist Russia”.

=== Soviet art historians and cultural researchers of the 1950s-1960s about the painting ===
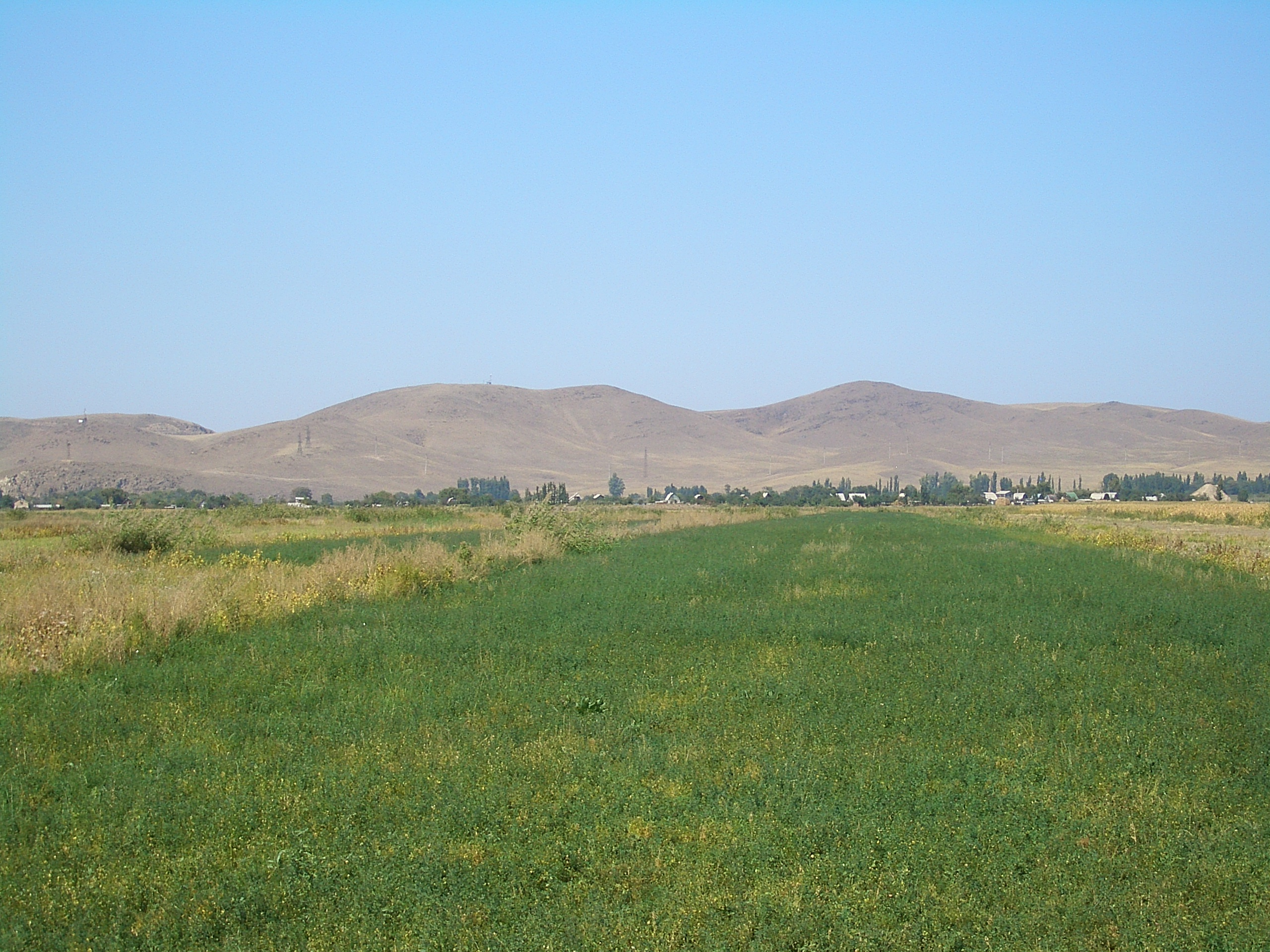
Landscape of Chui Valley (looking north). Photo, 2007

Dr. Andrey Chegodaev, Doctor of Art History, in a book on the artist's work published in 1952, quoting Chuykov himself, called the painting Daughter of Soviet Kirgizia “an embodiment of the spiritual and cultural growth of the Kyrgyz people” and “one of the most vivid expressions of socialist realism in Soviet painting”. He emphasized the clarity and simplicity of the girl's representation, which also conveys a monumental quality. He noted that in this painting, Chuykov abandoned his favored “muted and restrained shades” in favor of “deep and ringing colors”. The painting, in his opinion, became the centerpiece for the audience in the cycle Kyrgyzia Collective Farm Suite.

Elena Zhidkova saw in the painting “the romance of irresistible forward movement”, similar to the image of the “wide step” of the characters in Vera Mukhina's sculptural group Worker and Kolkhoz Woman (in Chuykov's painting, the girl is depicted only at the knee). The energy and laconicism of the painting make it unforgettable for the viewer. Zhidkova wrote that Chuykov had worked out the movement of the heroine several times at the stage of album sketches, drawing the head, the figure and the gesture of the hand holding the book in coloured pencil or oil. The basis of the picture is the plasticity of the form and its change under the influence of light. Colour, according to Zhidkova, enriches this plasticity. Color, according to Zhidkova, enriches this plasticity. The colour solution of the canvas was not an end in itself; the artist's task was to express the "beauty of the ideal". Nevertheless, he worked out every centimetre of the painting. Zhidkova paid particular attention to the girl's dark-skinned face and hands, as well as the combination of blue and pale pink colours in her clothes, which the artist carefully observed in the Kyrgyz national costume. At the same time, Chuykov was sparing in his choice of details, which gave the picture a clear and monumental simplicity. According to her, this approach made Daughter of Soviet Kyrgyzstan "an embodiment of the dignity of the people and a symbol of the future".

The depth of space, from Elena Zhidkova's point of view, is conveyed by the artist with the help of "air perspective", which changes the colour of the light-air environment that fills the typical landscape of Kyrgyzstan: a wide valley, smooth outlines of mountain ranges and a high sky. Colour and plastic variety are subordinated to the task of revealing the ideological and emotional meaning.

Galina Leontyeva wrote that for Simion Chuykov in the painting The Daughter of Soviet Kyrgyzstan, nature is inseparable from man: "the earth nourishes man, man gives the earth his labour, his affection, his love". She believed, that Chuykov depicted this connection “with the brilliance and perfection of mature skill.” Leontyeva noted the composition of the painting, its poetry, and the picturesque richness of the canvas. She believed that it would have been much easier to reflect the problem that worried him in a plot canvas, where some event would allow for the depiction of a clash of characters. Chuykov chose a single-figure composition. The only character creates the image of a “renewed, young, free country”. Chuykov himself wrote about it: “Majestic expanses of valleys, flooded with a sea of light and air, vast pastures, and grandiose silhouettes of mountain ranges, in my opinion, harmonize with the image of a free man, the master of this nature”. Leontyeva wrote that the landscape in the painting lives through its “epic beginning”: wide dales, mountains shrouded in haze, and a high dome of sky. Nature on the canvas is “solemnly serene”. Chuykov did not depict external manifestations of nature: “rushing clouds, turbulent wind, sparkling lightning, or thunder showers”. Poetry for him is embedded in “everyday life”.

According to Leontyeva, in a single-figure composition the nuances of the model's movement and posture on the canvas become more important. Chuykov managed to find the correct position of the figure on the canvas plane, reflecting the internal logic of the composition and its connection with the concept of the canvas. He increased the distance from the edge of the canvas in front of the figure more than behind it. This ratio gave the painting a sense of forward movement. In Leontyeva's opinion, the direction of the heroine's movement had been found correctly. If Chuykov had depicted the girl walking towards the viewer (from the front), it would have given the canvas a poster-like appearance and robbed the picture of the feeling of the vast expanses of Kyrgyzstan, which plays an important role "in the emotional structure" of the canvas. He built the composition of the painting "on monumental relations of large forms".

By lowering the horizon line, Chuykov has placed the girl's figure almost entirely against the blue sky. As the viewer is forced to look at the girl as if from below, her fragile figure takes on a monumental quality. This is reinforced by the severity of the girl's silhouette against the sky. Chuykov does not use external signs of romance, such as spectacular gestures or the beauty of facial features, to depict the heroine. On the contrary, he emphasised the girl's reserve and inner concentration, her firmness, quiet dignity and determination. The heroine's "round, cheek-boned face, with deep-set eyes" is the most ordinary "that thousands of auls and nomads in the Kyrgyz region encounter". The combed hair reveals to the viewer "a high, clean forehead".

Leontyeva noted Chuykov's use of a contrasting ratio of three primary colours: blue, red and white. According to the art historian, this creates a feeling of strength and joy. The harmony between these three colours, Leontyeva said, was made possible by the "general warm tone" of the canvas: "the scene is as if shaken by the air, trembling with heat, and this light haze softens the outlines, mutes the ringing colours". Lilac, silver and nacre tones create "the richest palette". The artist's use of light and shadow is painterly. The combination of white, red and blue in the painting was interpreted differently by Yulia Bolshakova. She wrote that this combination, together with the rich hues of the blue sky and the sun-drenched landscape, gave the canvas a sense of romantic excitement. The figure of the girl here is "as if flying over the horizon", but the laconicism of the pose, "the lack of chance in the features of the face" and the strict concentration of the heroine give the picture, according to Bolshakova, a monumental quality.

=== Soviet art historians and cultural researchers of the 1970s and 1980s about the painting ===
Anatoly Bogdanov, in a sketch of the artist's work, noted that the ideological capacity of the content corresponds to the artistic structure of the painting, first of all to its composition: it "juxtaposes a scaled human figure with a landscape background, which forms the background". The vertical format of the painting also corresponds to this idea. It allows Chuykov to show the girl's figure almost at full height. The low point from which the artist's gaze is directed at her emphasises the heroine's monumentality and determination. The composition corresponds to the colour scheme: the bright reds and blues of the heroine's clothes contrast with the soft pastels of the landscape (golden ears of corn, bluish mountains, pale blue sky). The girl's self-confident and proud look corresponds to the colours that show strength and the rise of vitality. The girl's figure is painted with "dense, material brushstrokes", while the landscape is free and light, characteristic of sketches.

Bogdanov noted the difference between two of the artist's famous paintings, The Daughter of Soviet Kyrgyzstan and The Chaban's Daughter. Despite the common principles of composition, the different colour palettes convey different concepts: in the first painting, the bright and energetic colours convey a sense of the heroine's strong-willed character, while in the second, the converging and seemingly flowing tones create a mood of serenity.

Jamal Umetalieva, in her monograph on the development of Kyrgyz painting, echoed Leontyeva's conclusions about the colourism of the canvas. Complementing them, she wrote that the bright red colour used by Chuykov enlivens the whole painting and "makes all the tones sound with the greatest force". He builds up light and shade in the painting by changing the strength of the light while maintaining the same quality of the colours. According to Umetalieva, he used shadows as a special artistic technique that gave the canvas "special beauty and colour expressiveness”. Umetalieva particularly emphasised the shadows on the edge of the girl's skirt, where Chuykov applied blue-violet paint, and the elusive colours used to convey the transitions of light — the heroine's clothes shimmer with silver, pearlescent and blue-violet tones. For her, the colours in the painting express "the poetry of life and the general mood" of festivity and joy. She believed that the artist had imbued the small canvas with epic qualities.

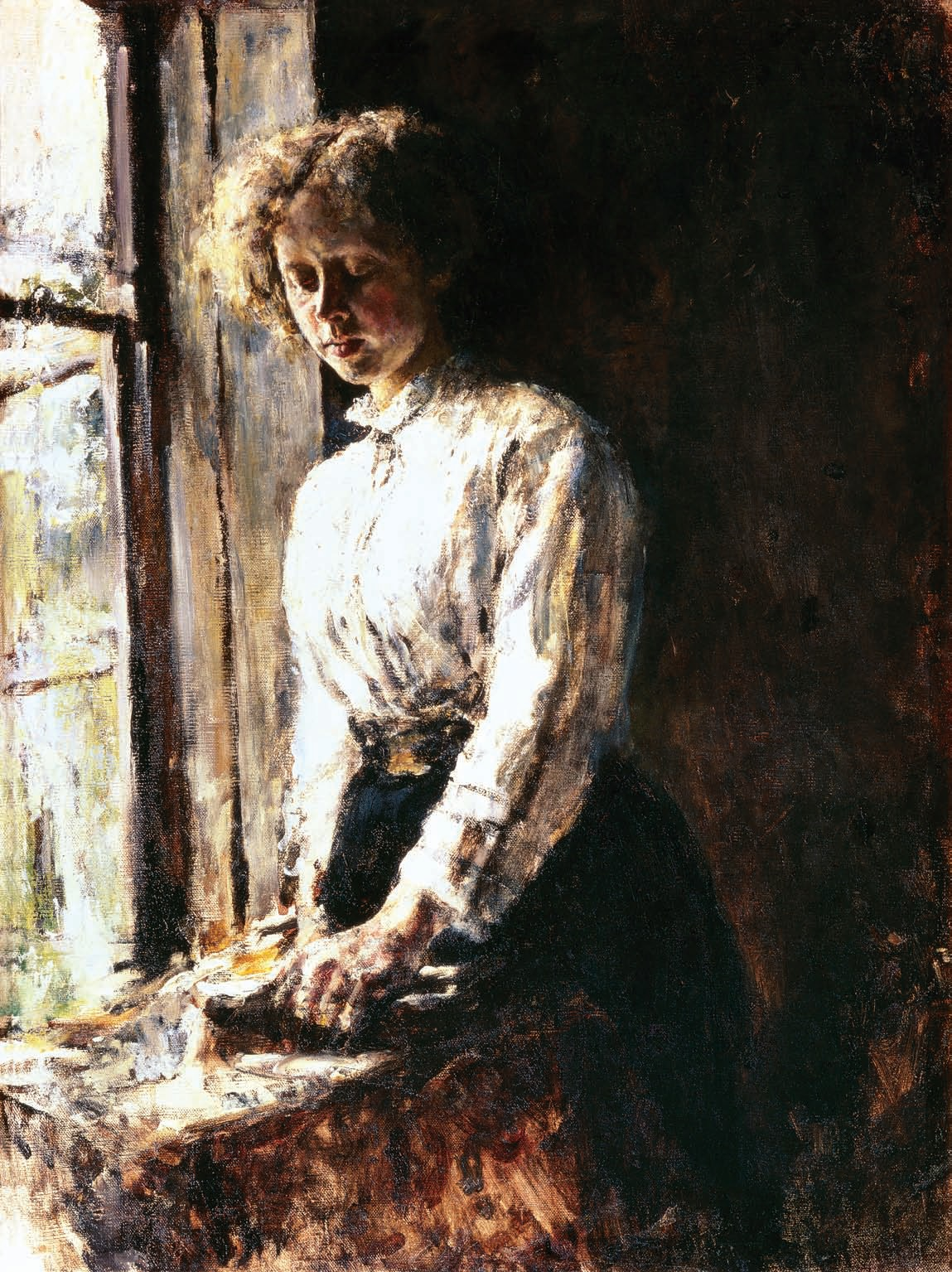
Valentin Serov, By the Window

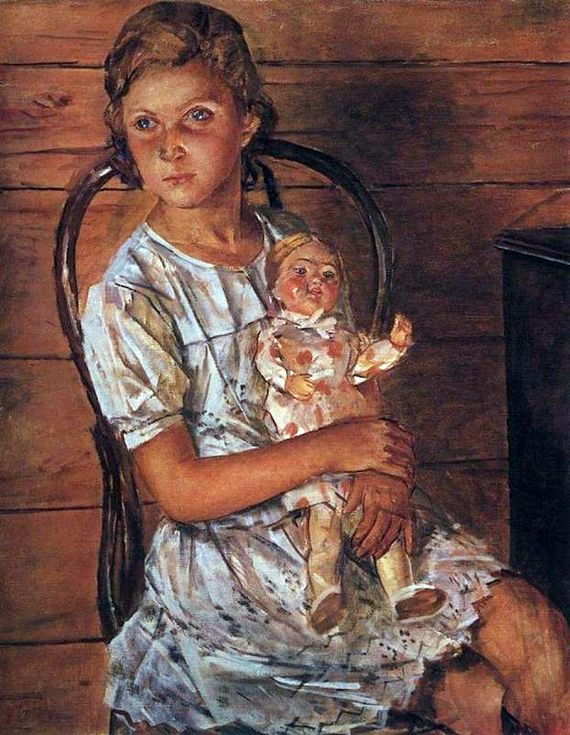
Kuzma Petrov-Vodkin. Tatuli's Portrait (or A Girl with a Doll), 1937

Academician Dmitry Sarabyanov noted the artist's skill in using subtle transitions of colour to create the volume and shape of the girl's body, the texture of her clothes and the depth of space in the landscape opening up in the distant background. The concentration on the girl's face, he wrote, 'can only be compared to the concentration of the artist himself, reverently touching the canvas and working out every tiny part of its surface'. He wrote that Chuykov did not fall into illusion and in no way deviated from the truth of life. For Sarabyanov, the painting itself is "an emblem of the new life of the Kyrgyz people”.

In his monograph on the development of Soviet portrait art, Leonid Zinger, a doctor of art history, noted that Chuykov's painting, in terms of composition and colour, goes back to the works of Vasily Surikov, Valentin Serov and Mikhail Vrubel. On the other hand, he found similarities between the canvas and early Soviet portrait types. The Daughter of Soviet Kirgizia is linked to them by the generalisation of the image, the monumentality, the heroic-romantic interpretation and the symbolism (the red revolutionary headscarf, the books in her hand symbolising the quest for knowledge). From Zinger's point of view, Chuykov brought to this canvas a characteristic soulfulness that was missing not only in the portraits, but also in his early works, including those from the war period. In a personal letter to Zinger, Chuykov wrote about the painting: "I try to create a general, associative picture; I want the picture to speak not only about a certain event or a certain person, but also about people, their destiny and our time".

Soviet art historians have emphasised the girl's independence and energy, which is strikingly different from the position of women in pre-revolutionary Kyrgyzstan: "Everything in her appearance — in her calm posture, in her unhurried step, in her clear face drenched with a dark blush - shows that she feels herself the mistress of the land. The Daughter of Soviet Kyrgyzstan, whose people were handicapped, backward and oppressed before the revolution, looks confidently ahead”. The painting reveals the new Soviet image of the Kyrgyz girl and of Soviet Kyrgyzstan itself. Art historians have noted that this feeling is created by the composition of the painting (low horizon line) and the combination of colours (bright orange shawl, blue velvet jacket, dark complexion burnt by the southern sun). Oleg Sopotsinsky noted that in his paintings Chuykov "does not show active action or sharp dramatic collisions, but tries to express the high ethical structure of ordinary Soviet people, their nobility and the clarity of their view of the world". The image of the heroine, he wrote, is characterised by integrity and meaning; she is "the mistress of a great country, her path in life is clear and straight". Soviet art historian Lilia Bolshakova emphasised that the artist revealed a close relationship between man and the land that nourished him, using bright decorative colours to unite the landscape and the girl's costume into a single colouristic whole, showing the completeness and capacity of the content of the picture, as well as the poetic feeling embedded in the canvas.

=== Contemporary art historians and cultural researchers about the painting ===
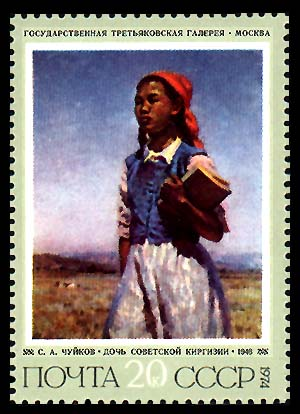
USSR postage stamp, 1974, from the series Soviet Painting

Contemporary art historians note that The Daughter of Soviet Kyrgyzstan was reproduced in Soviet times in printed publications, supporting the ideologically seasoned phrases about “the international feat of the Russian artist who devoted his talent to the life of the Kyrgyz people”. However, the painting itself does not allow speculation about official engagement or political conjuncture. In the magazine Kurak, art historian Sarman Akylbekov noted Chuykov's deep penetration into the Kyrgyz national character and his talent as a scenography designer: “The red shawl of the Daughter of Soviet Kirgizia and the blue sky above her are not only consonant with the Kyrgyz tradition of color combination in applied art: the artist, like a stage director, taking advantage of the natural sunlight, created an amazing mise-en-scène, in which the plastic figure of a spiritualized girl walking with books is the center of the artist's thoughts about the beautiful future of the nation”. The authors of the book Simion Afanasyevich Chuykov and His Epoch: 1902–1980, published in 2007, emphasize the realism of the painting: “There is no tendency and tension. A Kyrgyz girl got up early in the morning, washed her face, took a book, and went to study, and it is this combination of purity, simplicity, and greatness that became a symbol of a new life in a new country. This was true in life, and it became a true in art”.

The authors of the collective monograph Art Beyond Borders: Artistic Exchange in Communist Europe, published in Leipzig in 2016, note that the composition of the painting is constructed in such a way that the figure of the heroine seems to be pushed into the sky, making her a monument of illusory freedom and a reminder of the destroyed past. At the same time, they perceive the figure of the girl on the canvas as somewhat indeterminate and unstable, as she stands emphatically alone against the background of the steppe, too neat and too proud of her status. From the authors' perspective, the painting demonstrates not so much the rapid movement of Soviet Kyrgyzstan on the path of progress as the penetration of the new socialist ideology into the minds of the young generation of Kyrgyz.

A contemporary Kyrgyz art historian writes about the painting:

When I first saw the painting The Daughter of Soviet Kyrgyzstan, I emphasized to myself the amazing similarity between me and the depicted girl: the same ruddy round cheeks, high forehead, swarthy skin, dark hair, also braided into thick braids, except that I didn't wear a headscarf. Later, as it turned out, many Kyrgyz girls thought that the Daughter of Soviet Kyrgyzstan was drawn from them. I was even a little offended. But in this, perhaps, lies the clue to the magnetic attraction that one feels when looking at Chuykov's paintings. All of them are native: there is a sound of the lullaby motif, that our mothers sing to us, children's songs, and poems about the boundless beauty of our lands and people.

Aktanova notes that Chuykov portrayed ordinary people, their honesty and directness. He avoided places attractive to tourists; he came to Issyk-Kul many times, but he never painted the lake. The monumental character of the painting is created by the fact that the girl walks almost beside the viewer, who sees her clearly and very closely.She walks with bold and quick steps towards the sky, giving the impression that she is passing the viewer quickly. Her determination is conveyed not by gestures but by her gaze. From the point of view of art historians, the girl is not of exceptional beauty in the Eastern or European sense, but she wins over the viewer with her reserve, her inner confidence and her strong character. A lowered horizon line allows the artist to show the figure of the girl with books in her hand almost entirely against the background of the sky and a chain of mountains. The viewer looks at the picture somewhat from below.

A parallel was drawn between the girl from Chuykov's painting and the female characters of writer Chingiz Aitmatov, a younger contemporary of Simion Chuykov.

== Daughter of Soviet Kirgizia in culture ==
Modern Kyrgyz official media claim that the painting Daughter of Soviet Kirgizia is the most famous work of Kyrgyz fine art. In April 1950, a reproduction of the painting was placed on the last page of the Ogonyok magazine, which had a circulation of 381,000. It appeared on a postage stamp issued in 1974 in the series Soviet Painting (CFA No. 4341, multicolor offset printing with varnish, coated paper, comb perforation, serration: 12 x 12 ½, design by artist I. Martynov, denomination – 20 kopecks, edition – 4,300,000). The stamps were sold in sheets of 18 stamps and 2 labels (4×5) and (5×4). The coupons were placed on the first and last place of the block. The reproductions of the painting were also published in a Russian language textbook for grades 5–6.

In 2015, the Russian Museum hosted an exhibition of paintings by the contemporary German neo-expressionist Georg Baselitz from the Albertina Gallery in Vienna. He showed Russian Paintings – a series that he began in the late 1990s. The paintings in this series are his expressionist response to the most famous paintings of Soviet Socialist Realism. In addition to reinterpretations of Isaac Brodsky's Lenin at Smolny, Boris Ioganson's At the Old Ural Factory, and Fyodor Reshetnikov's Low Marks Again, the artist also created a painting based on the canvas Daughter of Soviet Kirgizia.

External image
- | A Daughter of Soviet Kirghizia, a new version

In 2014, Kyrgyz and international media reported that in Bishkek there was a presentation of an art composition made on the wall of the building of Gymnasium No. 12. The end of the building is now decorated with a modernized version of Chuykov's painting Daughter of Soviet Kyrgyzstan. The painting depicts a girl with an iPad and white headphones associated with Apple. The work was funded by the US Embassy and produced by a group of local artists in collaboration with an American artist. Sergei Keller, Dmitry Petrovsky, and Eugene Makshakov worked on the image. Local publisher and journalist Bektur Iskender said:

Sure, a tablet and headphones are incredibly mundane. But so be it. It's good that we can alter the sacred with impunity. I'm all for unfettered creativity. There should be nothing that makes us afraid to breathe. I want us in my country not to be afraid to make jokes... We will only be strong if we can treat every fact of our past with humour, instead of wasting energy tilting at windmills.

== Bibliography ==
=== Sources ===
- Постановлении Совета Министров СССР «О присуждении Сталинских премий за выдающиеся работы в области искусства и литературы за 1948 год» [Resolution of the Council of Ministers of the USSR On awarding Stalin prizes for outstanding works in the field of art and literature for 1948] (in Russian). Правда: Газета. 1949.
- Chuykov, S. A. (1963). Избранные произведения. Сопоцинский О. И. [Selected Works. Sopotsinsky O. I.] (in Russian). М.: Издательство Академии художеств СССР. p. 23.
- Chuykov, S. A. (1967). На пути к картине // Записки художника [On the way to the picture // The artist's notes] (in Russian). М.: Молодая гвардия. pp. 44–65.

=== Researches and non-fiction ===
- Aktanova, D. (2013). Дочь Советской Киргизии [Daughter of Soviet Kyrgyzstan] (in Russian). #ONE: Журнал. pp. 78–80.
- Bogdanov, A. A. (1970). Семён Афанасьевич Чуйков [Simion Afanasievich Chuykov]. Народная библиотека по искусству (in Russian). Л.: Художник РСФСР. p. 59.
- Bolshakova, L. A. (1976). Государственная Третьяковская галерея [State Tretyakov Gallery] (in Russian). М.: Изобразительное искусство. p. 159.
- Bolshakova, Yu. B. (1972). Чуйков. Альбом [Chuykov. The Album] (in Russian). М.: Изобразительное искусство. p. 26.
- Whipper B. R.; Kaufmann R. S. (1964). Живопись // История русского искусства в 13-ти томах [Painting // History of Russian Art in 13 volumes] (in Russian). Vol. XIII. М.: Наука. pp. 164–222.
- Volosovykh, S. B. (1957). Изобразительное искусство Киргизской ССР [Fine Art of the Kyrgyz SSR] (in Russian). М.: Советский художник. p. 24.
- Dyadyuchenko, L. B. (2003). Семён Чуйков: Документальная повесть [Semyon Chuikov: A documentary story]. Жизнь замечательных людей Кыргызстана (in Russian). ЖЗЛК. p. 276. ISBN 9967-21-861-4
- Zhidkova, E. V. (1964). "Киргизская колхозная сюита" // Семён Афанасьевич Чуйков [“Kirghiz Kolkhoz Suite” // Semyon Afanasyevich Chuikov] (in Russian). М.: Искусство. pp. 43–58.
- Zinger, L. S. (1980). Памяти большого художника // Певец киргизского народа. Сост. Мельникер А. С., Попова А. П. [In memory of a great artist // Singer of the Kyrgyz people. Compiled by A. S. Melniker, A. P. Popova. Melniker A. S., Popova A. P.] (in Russian). Фрунзе: Кыргызстан. pp. 36–45.
- Zinger, L. S. (1989). Послевоенный портрет // Советская портретная живопись 1930-х – конца 1950-х годов [Postwar portrait // Soviet portrait painting of the 1930s - late 1950s] (in Russian). М.: Изобразительное искусство. pp. 169–297. ISBN 5-85200-014-0
- Lebedev, P. I. (1963). Искусство портрета в послевоенной живописи // Русская советская живопись. Краткая история [The Art of Portrait in Postwar Painting // Russian Soviet Painting. Brief history] (in Russian). М.: Советский художник. pp. 220–229.
- Leontyeva, G. K. (1964). С. А. Чуйков. Дочь Советской Киргизии. 1948 // Замечательные полотна [S. A. Chuykov. Daughter of Soviet Kyrgyzstan. 1948 // Remarkable paintings] (in Russian). Л.: Художник РСФСР. pp. 282–286.
- Markina, T. (2006a). Искусство конца эпохи. Ярмарка "Полвека советского искусства" [Art of the end of an epoch. Half a Century of Soviet Art Fair] (in Russian). Коммерсантъ Weekend: Журнал. p. 68.
- Markina, T. (2006b). Мальчиков Александра Дейнеки оценили недорого. Закрылась ярмарка "Полвека советского искусства" [Alexander Deineka's boys were cheaply priced. Closing the Half a century of Soviet art Fair] (in Russian). Коммерсантъ: Газета. p. 13.
- Polischuk, E. A. (1985). С. Чуйков. Из собрания Государственной Третьяковской галереи [S. Chuykov. From the collection of the State Tretyakov Gallery] (in Russian). М.: Изобразительное искусство. p. 48.
- Sadykov T. S., Prytkova L. A. (1982). Художники советской Киргизии [Soviet Kirghizia artists] (in Russian). Кыргызстан. p. 272.
- Sarabyanov, D. V. (1981). Творческий путь Семёна Чуйкова // Певец киргизского народа. Сост. Мельникер А. С., Попова А. П. [Simion Chuykov's Artistic Way // Singer of the Kyrgyz People] (in Russian). Фрунзе: Кыргызстан. pp. 24–36.
- Sarabyanov, D. V. (1976). "II. Киргизская колхозная сюита". Семён Чуйков [Simion Chuykov] (in Russian). М.: Советский художник. pp. 41–76.
- Семён Афанасьевич Чуйков, Государственная Третьяковская галерея [Simion Afanasyevich Chuykov, State Tretyakov Gallery]. Образ и цвет (in Russian). М.: Изобразительное искусство. 1972. p. 4.
- Семён Афанасьевич Чуйков и его эпоха. 1902–1980 [Simion Afanasyevich Chuykov and his era. 1902-1980] (in Russian). Бишкек: Курама АРТ. 2007. p. 152.
- Семён Чуйков "Дочь Советской Киргизии" [Simion Chuykov “Daughter of Soviet Kyrgyzstan”] (in Russian). Огонёк: Журнал. 1950.
- Sopotsyonsky, О. I. (1966). Советское искусство. Живопись // Всеобщая история искусств под общей редакцией Б. В. Веймарна и Ю. Д. Колпинского [Soviet Art. Painting] (in Russian). Vol. 6. Book 2. Искусство XX века. М.: Искусство. pp. 97–139.
- Tolstova, Т. (2015). Русские картины с немецкими вопросами [Russian pictures with German questions] (in Russian). Коммерсантъ: Газета.
- Umetalieva, D. T. (1978). Рост мастерства, расширение тематики и жанров в послевоенный период // Изобразительное искусство Киргизии [Growth of mastery, expansion of themes and genres in the post-war period] (in Russian). Фрунзе: Кыргызстан. pp. 46–90.
- Umetalieva, D. T. (1970). Киргизская жанровая живопись в послевоенный период // Киргизская жанровая живопись [Kyrgyz genre painting in the post-war period] (in Russian). Фрунзе: Илим. pp. 24–56.
- Chegodaev, A. D. (1952). Семён Афанасьевич Чуйков. Народный художник Киргизской ССР [Simion Chuykov. People's Artist of the Kyrgyz SSR] (in Russian). М.: Искусство.
- Bazin, Jérôme; Dubourg Glatigny, Pascal; Piotrowski, Piotr, eds. (2016). Art beyond Borders: Artistic Exchange in Communist Europe (1945–1989). Leipzig studies on the history and culture of East-Central Europe. Vol. 3. Leipzig: Central European University Press. p. 530. ISBN 9-789-6338-6083-0.
- Bulanova M.; Rosenfeld A. (2006). Soviet Dis-union: Socialist Realist & Nonconformist Art. Minneapolis: Museum of Russian Art (Minneapolis). p. 183. ISBN 978-0972-1493-27.
- Rickleton, Chris (29 August 2014). "La fillette kirghize emblème de l'ère soviétique aura son iPad" [The Kyrgyz girl, emblem of the Soviet era, gets her iPad]. Le Nouvel Observateur (in French). No. 235. p. 68.
