= New Moscow (painting) =

Painting by Yuri Pimenov

- Artist: Yuri Pimenov
- Year: 1937
- Type: Oil on canvas
- Dimensions: 140 cm × 170 cm (55 in × 67 in)
- Location: Tretyakov Gallery, Moscow

New Moscow is a painting by the Soviet artist Yuri Pimenov, created in 1937. The painting symbolically expresses the new way of socialist life in the USSR. In a poetic form, it expresses the artist's pride in his country. The art historian Loginova called it the most popular of the master's works and programmatic for him. It is in the collection of the State Tretyakov Gallery and is shown in its permanent exhibition.

This painting was presented at major international exhibitions several times. Art historians consider it one of the best paintings of the 1930s.

== History and destiny of the painting ==
In the 1930s, Soviet painting was dominated by narrative and plot. It was based on an acute conflict or clash of characters. Yuri Pimenov (1903–1977) chose a poetic understanding of reality, tried to convey feelings, which would become characteristic of postwar Soviet painting.

In the 1930s, Pimenov became interested in the work of Jean-François Millet, Pierre Auguste Renoir, Édouard Manet, Valentin Serov, and his own artistic style was strongly influenced by Impressionism. In an article written in 1937, Pimenov named Jan Vermeer, Jean-Baptiste Chardin, Antoine Watteau, Raphael Santi, Paul Verlaine, Boris Pasternak, Claude Debussy among his favorite authors. The lyrical beginning in his works intensified; the main themes of his work were: woman, city life and changing modernity. The artist wrote about his desire to convey "the great events of life in ordinary prosaic situations", "to extend the boundaries of the poetic, to capture the new things that time brings and that have long remained unrecognized and unnoticed". Recognition came to him. In 1936-1939, the artist was commissioned to create panels for the USSR's exposition at the World's Fair in New York and Paris. At the exhibition "Art and Technology in the Modern World" (1937) in Paris, Yuri Pimenov was awarded the gold medal.

The painting was created in the summer of 1937 for the exhibition "The Industry of Socialism." The exhibition was to be opened on November 8, 1937, to mark the 20th anniversary of Soviet government and the end of the Second Five-Year Plan. The idea of the exhibition was to demonstrate the triumph of the socialist system and the achievements of industrialization. Artists were given a list of themes to familiarize themselves with, and they could choose their favorites. There was one section in the list: "New Cities, New People" (Pimenov's painting was created within this framework). After the artist chose a theme and it was approved, he submitted a sketch. The sketch was approved by the exhibition preparation committee. After that, the artist received an advance payment and started working. If necessary, the artists traveled to the place of the painting, for which funds were also allocated. After a certain period of time, the painting was presented to the commission. There were cases when the commission generally accepted the work, but pointed out the shortcomings and ordered corrections in the painting. The exhibition opened on March 18, six months late. During this time, half of the committee organizing the exhibition was repressed as members of the Anti-Soviet "Bloc of Rightists and Trotskyites". The painting immediately attracted attention and received wide acclaim, but at the same time some art historians accused the canvas of formalism because of the fractional brushstrokes characteristic of the Impressionists.

Technique of painting is oil on canvas. Its size is 140 × 17 cm. The inventory number in the collection of the Tretyakov Gallery is 27707. "New Moscow" came to the Tretyakov Gallery in 1945 and since then has been in the permanent exhibition. At present it is exhibited in room 15 of the State Tretyakov Gallery building in Krymsky Val. The painting has been repeatedly shown at major international exhibitions, in particular at the XXVIII Venice Biennale in 1956, at the exhibitions "Communism — Dream Factory", held in Frankfurt, and "Russia", at the Solomon R. Guggenheim Museum in New York City, at the exhibition "Warsaw - Moskwa / Moscow - Warsaw. 1900-2000" in 2004-2005 in the capitals of both countries.

== The history of painting studies ==
The analysis of Yuri Pimenov's painting is usually present in general reviews of Soviet art history. In 2009, the candidate of philosophical sciences Sergey Ivannikov published the article "Yuri Pimenov's 'New Moscow'. Experience of deconstruction of the aesthetic image". In 2016, the publication of an article by an anonymous author in the popular scientific-historical magazine Diletant "Artist Yuri Pimenov and his painting 'New Moscow'".

In 2017, the Tretyakov Gallery Publishing House published the book "Yuri Pimenov. New Moscow" by Elena Voronovich. The publication reconstructs the history of the creation of the canvas. It tells about life in Moscow in the 1930s, about the heroine — an attractive and independent woman of the Soviet society. A special section traces the further use of this plot in Pimenov's work. The same publishing house in 2017 published the booklet "Yuri Pimenov. New Moscow" by Yana Laguzinskaya and Marina Timofeeva.

== Plot and interpretation peculiarities ==
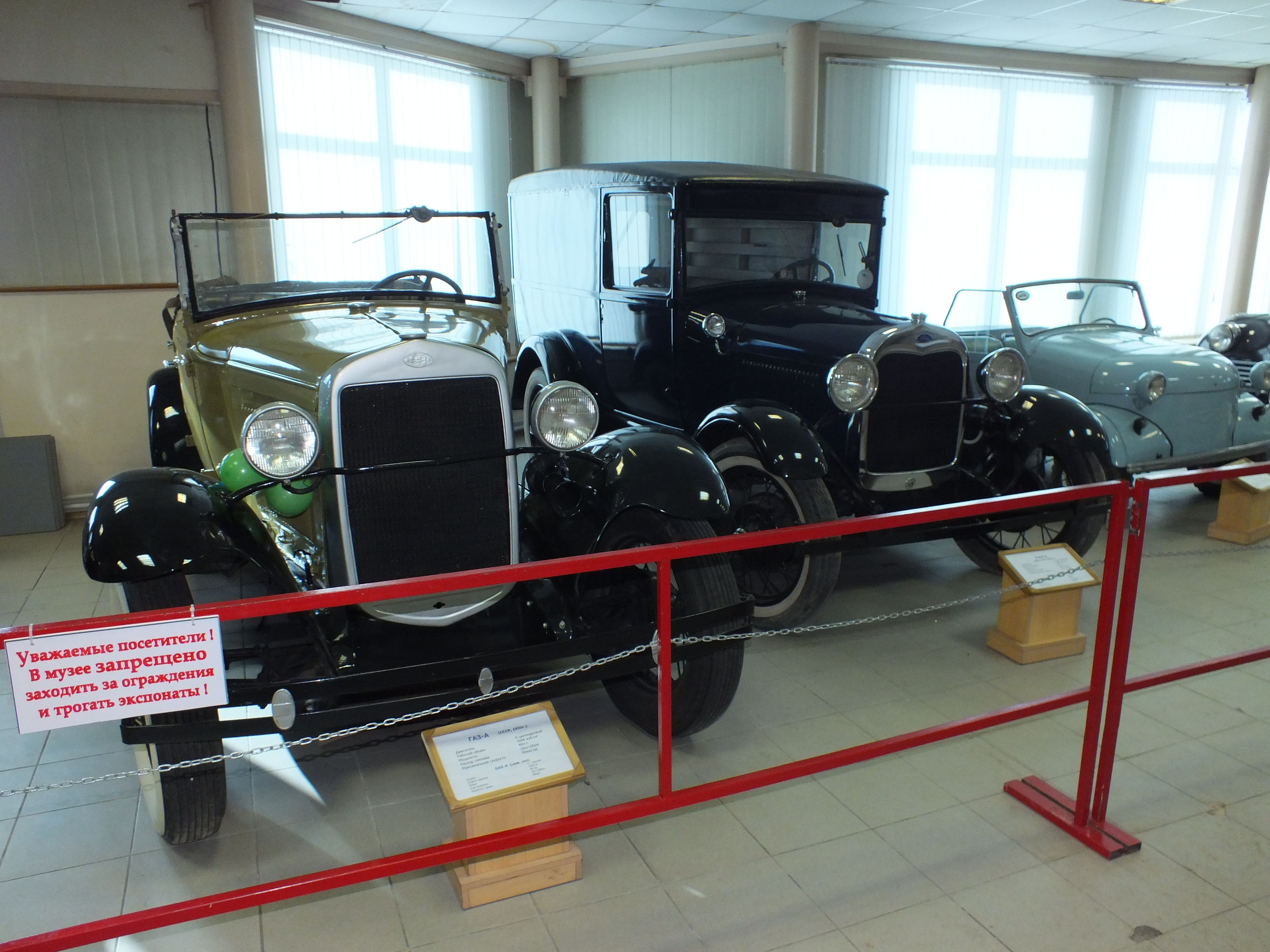
GAZ-A (left) and early model Ford model A (right) at the Vladivostok Museum of Automotive Antiques

Moscow. Summer. The action takes place in the morning of a workday. The artist depicted a square in the center of the capital and a wide avenue after a heavy rain. Cars on the sidewalk and crowds of pedestrians fill the city landscape with movement. The viewer is caught up in the rapid movement and rhythm of city life. In the foreground of the painting, a woman sits behind the wheel of a car with her back to the viewer. A young woman driving a car, for the mid-1930s a symbol of the new Moscow and new life. The speed of the car, the light color, the vastness of the space create a feeling of optimism and hope for a happy future. The artist himself wrote about the theme of rain in "Earth Art":

"City rain is full of such different images and moods. It brings to the artist no less a wealth of sensations and feelings than the fields covered with the gray shroud of autumn, than the puddles in the ruts of black country roads, than the sparkling drops on the pine branches and the sun through the steamy air of the wet forest".

The angle of the canvas imitates a shot from a movie. Two carnations, white and red, are attached to the side of the windmill, which makes the picture somewhat "glamorous". G. S. Kirillova noted that the painting is based on the artist's real observation. It conveys the documentary nature of the cityscape. In 1937, the viewer, looking at the picture, remembered how this place looked before: cramped, here were benches, stalls, wooden buildings.

=== The painter's model ===
The artist's model was his wife Natalia Konstantinovna. The artist almost always painted her rather than professional models . In the book "Earthly Art" he noted: "In my life wife ... always my best model — remembering my work, made over many years, I see her figure, her hair or hands ...". The woman is depicted from the back, but easily recognizable. The artist himself noted the Russian face of his wife, wrote that he used her as a model when he tried to move away from the schematism of youth and express a lively and tender feeling. Particular admiration for his "soft brown hair". For the first time Pimenov turned to the image of his wife's hair from the back in the study the "Golden Dress" (1936, canvas, oil, 55 × 45 cm, collection of M. G. Pimenov). When Natalia Konstantinovna posed her husband for the painting "New Moscow", she was expecting a child. Therefore, the picture is painted by a happy person who is in love with life.

=== The architectural elements of the painting ===
Galina Kirillova notes that the painting has a demonstrative quality, as if the artist "decided to show us the city with the broad gesture of a hospitable host. She compares it to Ilya Mashkov's still lifes, which present objects for the viewer's "observation". The space of the painting "New Moscow" rapidly narrows towards the center, forcing the viewer, without dwelling on the foreground, to shift his gaze to the second plan — to the buildings of the Stalin's Moscow reconstruction. At the same time, the gentle rhythms of the canvas convey peace and confidence. This is due in no small part to the symmetrical composition, which gives it stability even as it emphasizes the movement of the action.

One of the first images of the new Moscow during the reconstruction of the 1930s was Okhotny Ryad Street. A passenger car is approaching from Sverdlov Square (now Teatre Square). The building on the left is the former Continental Hotel (opened in 1887 in a building rebuilt by architect A. P. Beloyartsev; it was demolished in the late 1960s and early 1970s). In 1931 the Vostokkino cinema was opened here. The corner of the house on the right (it has a big white letter "M") is the ground lobby of the metro station "Okhotny Ryad", opened in 1935 in the old house rebuilt according to the project of the architect A.N. Chechulin. Behind the metro lobby there is the facade of the former building of the Assembly of the Nobility, then the House of the Unions. After the revolution the building of M. F. Kazakov became a place of state events: congresses of Soviets, trade unions, a place for funeral ceremonies, trials, chess tournaments, children's Christmas festivals. Voronovich supposed that the festive decoration of the House of Unions depicted by the artist was connected with the First All-Union Congress of Soviet Architects held there in June 1937, and the general festive atmosphere — with the opening of the Moscow Canal on July 15, 1937, which provided the capital with water. In the background, new buildings of Hotel "Moscow" and the Building of Council of Labor and Defense. On the left, Hotel "Moscow" (architects A. I. Savelyev, O. A. Stapran and A. V. Shchusev, 1933-1935). In the depth in the center: the house of the Council of People's Commissars of the USSR (1932-1935, architect A. Y. Langman, for a time there was the Council of Labor and Defense).

The buildings depicted in the painting

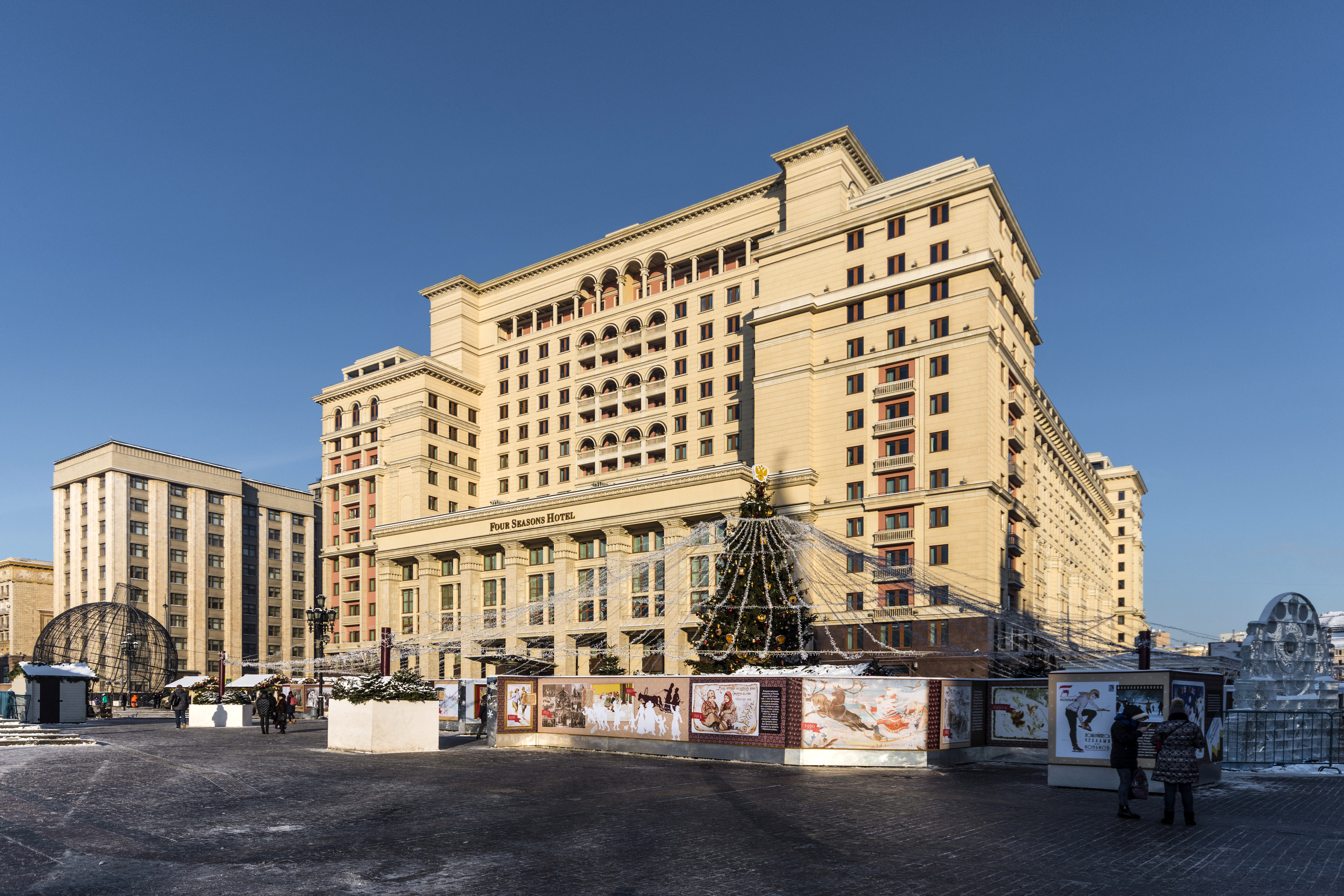
The "Moscow" Hotel

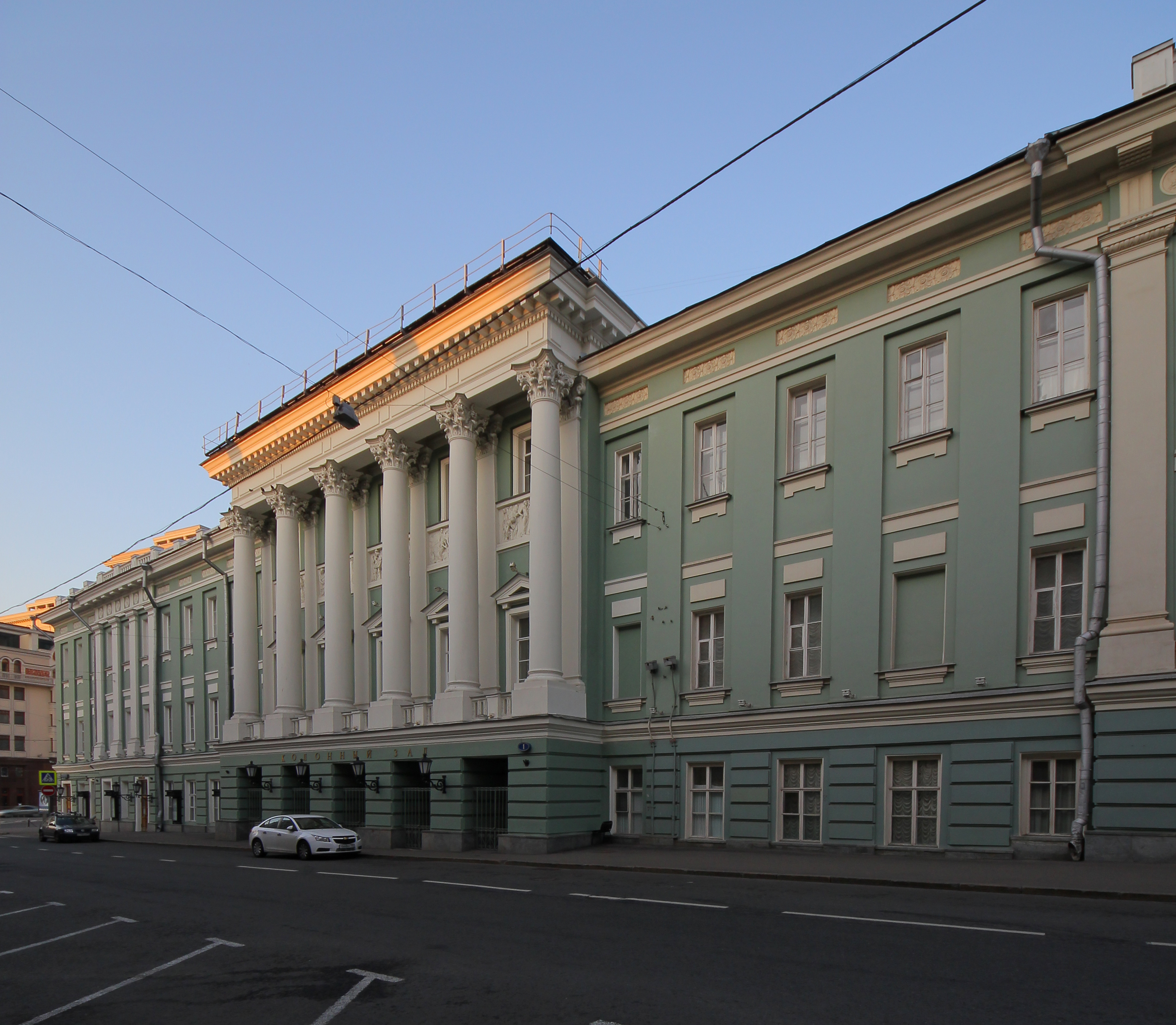
The House of the Unions

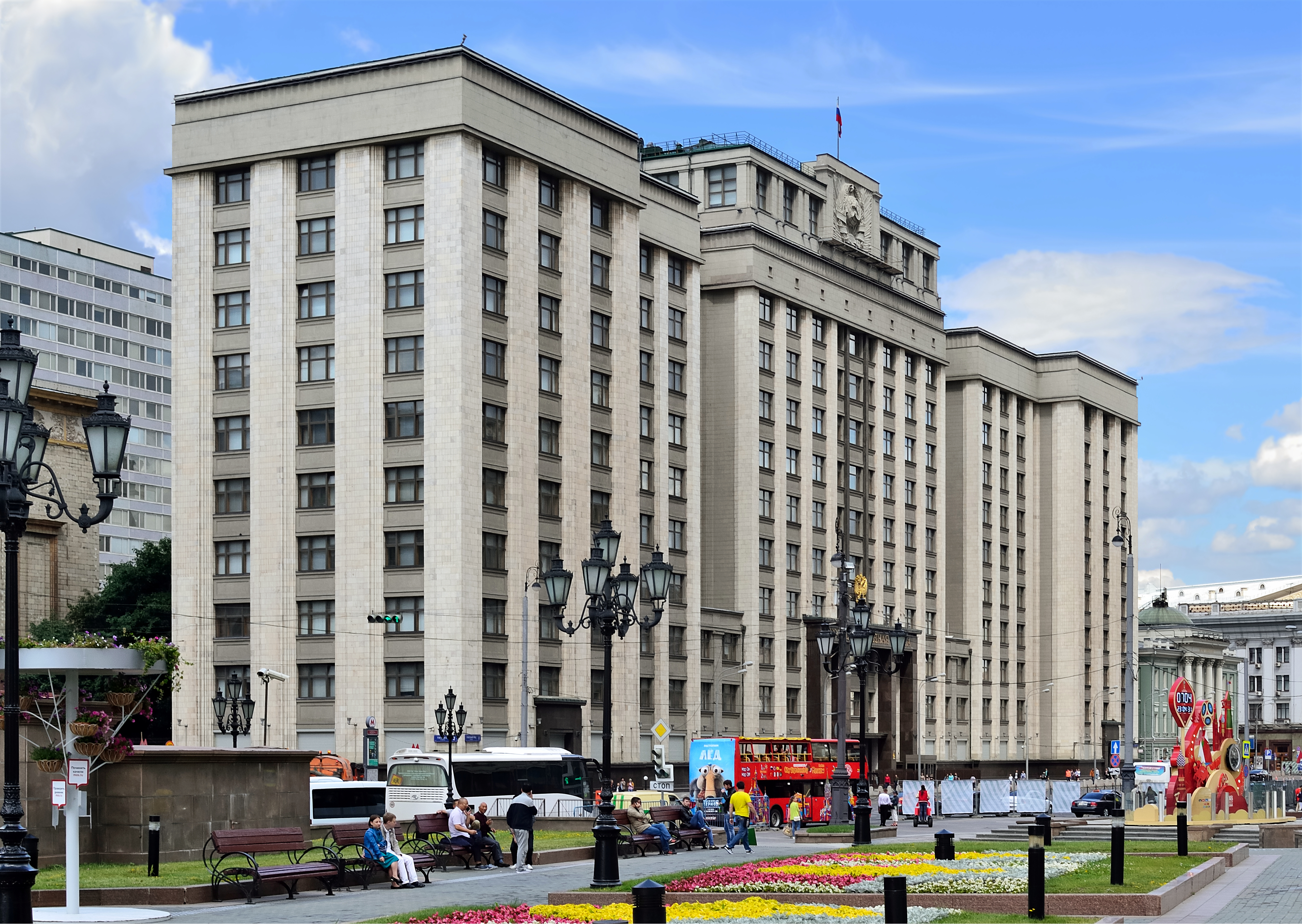
Building of Council of Labor and Defense

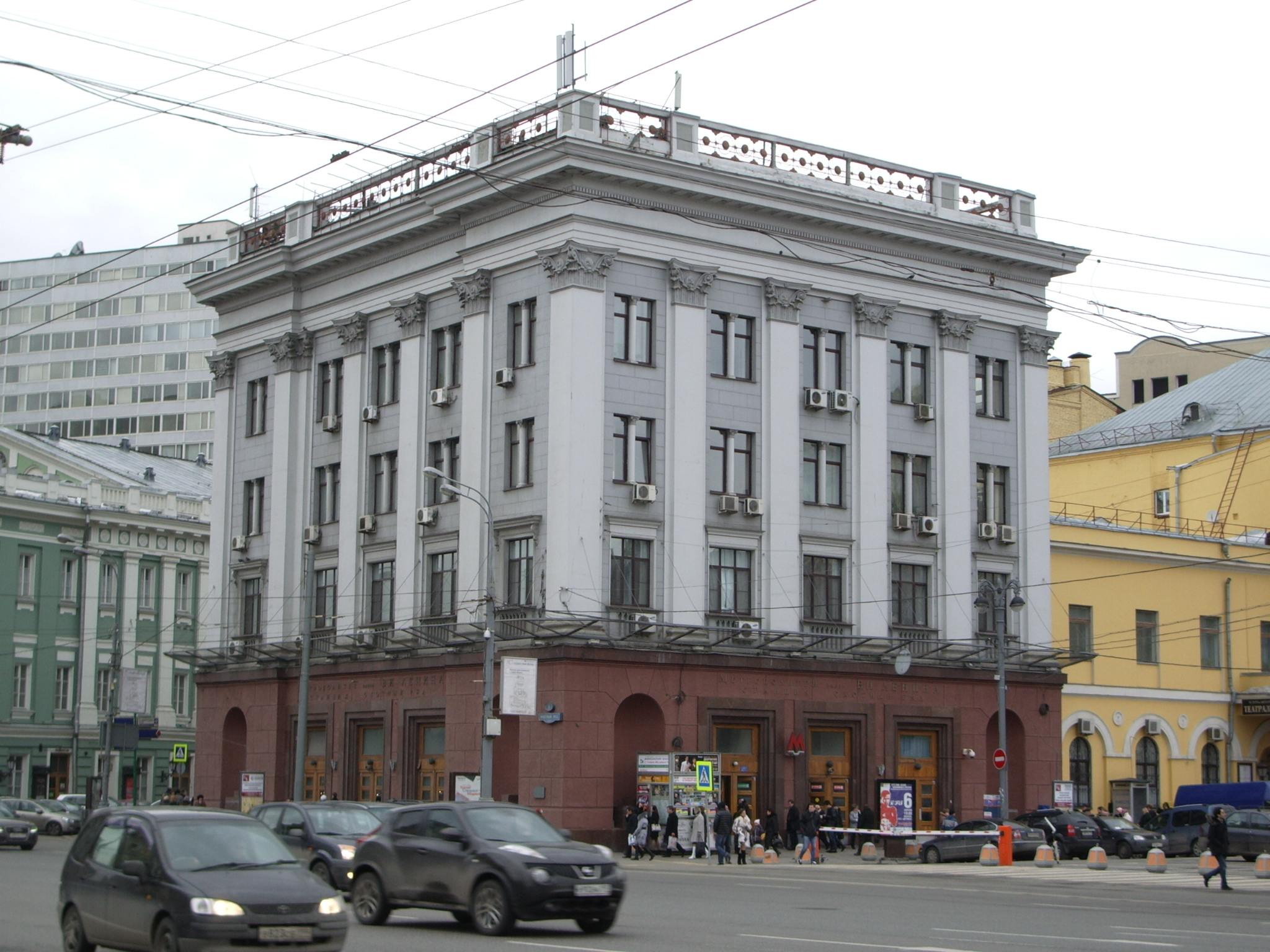
Okhotny Ryad metro station lobby

== Art historians, cultural critics, and audience reviews ==
=== Painting's cultural aspects ===
The key element in the official interpretation of the canvas was the word "new," which was included in the title of the painting. Pimenov placed the "new" (modern skyscrapers) behind the old, but "marked" with revolutionary paraphernalia. Symbolic art criticism linked the horizon to the theme of the future — the further away the skyline is from the viewer, the more distant the future it symbolizes. In "New Moscow" there is no horizon line. The future is on the near horizon as a set of tasks that society must solve. Therefore, Moscow's skyscrapers symbolize the future that is available to all those living today. The monumentality of the buildings, according to Sergey Ivannikov, candidate of philosophical sciences, corresponds to the height of the tasks that Soviet society will solve in the near future. Because of its compositional proximity to the "point of observation", this thought has a mobilizing potential. The way to it is direct and open, which allows us to interpret it as the result of a rational project. The red color of the posters indicates the force that develops this project. The road itself speaks of the "leading and guiding" power of the party. The "blurred vision" due to the recent rain makes the image of the future not quite concrete (the image of communism in Soviet ideology was not concrete either).

In "New Moscow", the symbolic aspiration to the future is taken up by the image of a car moving forward. The movement is smooth, without jerks, but the speed of this movement exceeds that of a pedestrian. Sergei Ivannikov saw in this a hidden dissonance between the image and ideology: the latter associated the future with the triumph of social and ethic justice, not technology.

There is no element of sacrifice and tragedy in the image. "The movement into the future is natural and even somewhat ordinary. According to Sergei Ivannikov, the car rushing forward pretends to be an erotic symbol. In fact, the woman driving the car is the central image of the painting. She realizes the connection between the world of the future and the sphere of desire in the viewer's subconscious. One of the main characteristics of this image is the absence of the heroine's face. The face concretizes the image, the sphere of desire turns out to be dependent on random circumstances. When the face is not visible to the viewer, there is a universalization of the image of the woman.

Sergei Ivannikov tried to determine the social class of the heroine of the picture. A personal car in the 1930s is a privilege of the top of the party and Soviet nomenklatura. However, the world of the nomenklatura in the 1930s is male. Therefore, he assumed that the woman was the wife of a high-ranking member of the nomenklatura. Ivannikov notes, however, that this shows the viewer that society is divided into two fundamentally unequal groups: those who walk and use public transportation and those who have the means to use private vehicles. The nomenklatura has a level of consumption of luxury goods that is excessive in the situation of the 1930s. The future has already arrived for them ("New Moscow", however, convinces the mass spectator that in the future the luxuries available only to the nomenklatura will be available to him). Ivannikov compares the painting with L. D. Trotsky's idea of the "upper class" in the USSR as the "new bourgeoisie" and believes that in Pimenov's painting a representative of this class is a "cultural" hero - the consumption of luxury is an act of demonstration and self-assertion. In his opinion, the artist turns out to be an instrument of this self-assertion; Ivannikov himself notes that the heroine of "New Moscow" is unlikely to live to the end of the year in her Moscow apartment at the height of Stalinist repression.

T. Gorodkova, chief curator of the Tretyakov Gallery, believes that the picture of the woman from behind gives reason to consider her with full authority as an "unknown woman of the Soviet period" (a hint to the Portrait of an Unknown Woman). She assumes that it refers to a real Soviet woman who was one of the first to drive a car in Moscow. Among the possible variants she mentioned Lilya Brik, who was the first Soviet woman to receive a driver's license in 1929, but her car was a Renault, Lubov Orlova, or one of the ballerinas of the Bolshoi Theatre (the car drives past her). Famous car enthusiasts in the 1930s were the ballerina Olga Lepeshinskaya and the singer Antonina Nezhdanova. The heroine sits behind the wheel of an open car of the "Phaeton" type. It is a GAZ-A car, produced under license of the American company "Ford" in the Gorky Automobile Plant from January 1932 to 1936.

The poster artist and writer N. N. Vatolina noticed that in the 1930s life in the USSR had somewhat deviated from the ascetic ideals of "existence without everyday life". In her opinion, Yuri Pimenov was one of the first to notice this change and reflect it in his paintings. In the painting "New Moscow" he introduces the heroine into the atmosphere of new clothes, automobility, housing construction, where she now belongs to a variety of roles. The heroine appears before the public "in all the bloom of self-confident youth", "more light, feminine, elegant" than in the artist's earlier works, but still retains her sportiness.

Art historian Jana Szklarska found Art Deco motifs in the subject of the painting: the emancipated girl sitting in an open car has, in her opinion, a rather bourgeois character. She noted that in 1939, despite its rapid popularity, the painting was attacked by some official critics, but the ideologically correct name "New Moscow" forced the critics to restrain their emotions and "look for signs in the painting of the already realized dream" of a happy future.

=== The pictorial features of the painting ===
Tatiana Gorodkova notes the closeness of the color solution of the picture to the works of Pierre Auguste Renoir. Elena Voronovich sees in the painting a combination of Art Nouveau (the use of cinematography in the composition — the camera seems to be fixed on the back seat of the car), Impressionism (the image of carefree joy of existence) and Socialist realism (the depiction of reality in its revolutionary development). The artist used the proportions of the golden ratio in constructing the composition. The illusion of movement created by the triangle formed by the narrowing street in the distance and the heroine's position to the right of the composition's center. Many well-differentiated brushstrokes create the impression of air vibration. Voronovich noticed the similarity of the composition of the painting with a frame from the film "Tanya" by Grigory Alexandrov (1940) — the Soviet Cinderella, played by Lyubov Orlova on a car, rises into the sky and flies over Moscow.

Loginova believes that Pimenov creates several large color spots on the canvas, but they are not evenly painted with one color plane, but rich in shades and color fragments, connected by common colors: blue and cold yellow. They penetrate the colored surface of the painting and create the feeling of a unified atmosphere. The artist's canvases are created with many strokes of delicate shades, but the forms of the objects depicted are material, the contours are definite, though softened with each other. Pale blue, lemon yellow, lilac, pink and pearl gray colors, superimposed with light strokes, give originality to the artist's manner. The picture is perceived as if through wet and transparent glass, and the surface of the canvas becomes silvery and fluid. According to O. M. Beskin, the poetic atmosphere in the picture is achieved by the warmth of the play of straw-yellow and golden tones, some of which turn blue, which was characteristic of Pimenov's work at that time. The woman's hair is tinted with "golden red", which is complemented by the pale violet color of her dress.

=== Composition peculiarities ===
Pimenov's composition solution is innovative. He makes the semantic center of the canvas the car and the young woman behind the wheel. The car is half cut off by the lower edge of the canvas, it "rushes" into the painting. The artist frees the space in front of the car, opening a wide expanse from edge to edge. This technique makes it possible to create an atmosphere of uninterrupted movement on a city street. The viewer becomes an imaginary passenger in the car, looking through the eyes of a woman and perceiving the Moscow panorama through her senses. The woman behind the wheel becomes a mediator between the viewer and the life of the inner space of the canvas, between the feelings and thoughts of the artist and the perception of the audience.

Doctor of art history A. I. Morozov notes the inspired and stylized atmosphere of the painting "New Moscow" in comparison with earlier paintings by the artist, its rationalism; he notes the artist's "invention" and "composition" in this painting.

Art historian Yana Shkliarska found in the painting the proportions of the golden ratio, as well as a triangle that sets the reverse perspective with a vanishing point at the level of the girl's head and formed by the backstage houses. The combination of direct and reverse perspective gives the possibility to switch from one motif to another. According to the art historian, this illusion of freedom is reinforced by the vibrating light environment of the painting, which erases the boundaries between reality and illusion.

== A motif of a woman behind the wheel ==
In 1944, the artist again depicted the girl driver with her back to the viewer in the painting "Front Road" (State Russian Museum). Instead of a sunny and peaceful Moscow, the canvas shows a winter road. A car is following a truck to the front. The heroine is driving the car, the passenger (he is a head taller than her) relies entirely on her skills as a chauffeur. Ahead of them — the outskirts of the city with the ruins of the Catholic church. O. M. Beskin believed that the artist was portraying the same woman who became the heroine of the painting "New Moscow". The proof of it he saw in the "Moscow behavior" of the heroine and in the fact that "how a little on the cap is worn ushanka, how arranged the hair at the back of the head, in how folded sits on her military dungaree coat".

The third time Yuri Pimenov returned to this motif in 1960, when he was commissioned to make a copy of the painting "New Moscow". The artist said: "When I began to work on the painting, I saw particularly clearly how Moscow had grown in recent years. And I wanted to paint not only a repetition, but essentially a new picture of his beautiful city of Moscow in 1960". The painting was called "Moscow 1960" (National Museum of Tajikistan, Dushanbe, canvas, oil, 140 × 170 cm). The heroine, depicted with a different hairstyle characteristic of the 1960s, driving an open ZIS-110, has a view of the Krymsky Bridge. The woman looks at the viewer flirting through the rear mirror.

== Bibliography ==
- Бескин О. М. Юрий Пименов. — М.: Советский художник, 1960. — 3700 экз.
- Ватолина Н. Н. Пейзажи Москвы. Несколько рассказов о Москве и творчестве художников, запечатлевших ее древний и сегодняшний облик.. — М.: Советский художник, 1983. — 344 p. — 30 000 copies.
- Воронович Е. Юрий Пименов. Новая Москва. — М.: Издательство Государственной Третьяковской галереи, 2017. — 36 p. — (История одного шедевра). — ISBN 978-5-89580-176-5.
- Глава XIII. Искусство 20 — 30-х годов. // История русского и советского искусства. Учебное пособие для вузов, обучающихся по специальности «История». Под редакцией Сарабьянова Д. В., Алленова М. М. и др. — М.: Высшая школа, 1989. — 448 p. — (Мастера). — 60 000 copies. — ISBN 5-06-001441-X.
- Долгополов И. В. Юрий Пименов // Мастера и шедевры. — М.: Изобразительное искусство, 1988. — V. III. — P. 351—412. — 784 p. — 100 000 copies.
- Долгополов И. В. Юрий Пименов. — М.: Терра-Книжный клуб, 2009. — 272 с. — (Мастера). — ISBN 978-5-275-02107-3.
- Городкова Т. С. Художник Юрий Пименов и его картина «Новая Москва». // Эхо Москвы : Электронная публикация. — 2007. — 23 September.
- Иванников С. И. «Новая Москва» Юрия Пименова. Опыт деконструкции эстетического образа. // АПН : Электронная публикация. — 2009. — 26 November. — P. 1–3.
- Кириллова Г. С. Юрий Иванович Пименов. — Л.: Художник РСФСР, 1980. — 71 p. — 30 000 copies.
- Леонтьева Г. К. Ю. И. Пименов. Новая Москва. 1937. // Замечательные полотна. Книга для чтения по истории русской советской живописи. В 2 томах. — Л.: Художник РСФСР, 1964. — V. 2. — P. 222—228. — 406 p. — 50 000 copies.
- Логинова Е. Б. Юрий Пименов. — М.: Изобразительное искусство, 1970. — 56 p. — 30 000 copies.
- Морозов А. И. Конец утопии. Из истории искусства в СССР 1930-х годов. — М.: Галарт, 1995. — 224 p. — ISBN 5-269-00902-1.
- Пименов Ю. И. Земное искусство. — М.: Галерея Леонида Шишкина, 2007. — 143 p. — ISBN 978-5-903033-04-1.
- Сопоцинский О. И. Советское искусство. Живопись. // Всеобщая история искусств. — М., 1966. — V. 2. Часть II. — P. 97–139. — 882 p.
- Художник Юрий Пименов и его картина «Новая Москва». // Дилетант : Журнал. — 2016. — 1 April. Archive: 7 October 2018.
- Шклярская Я. Г. Юрий Пименов (1881—1964) // Епихин С., Рассказова А., Светляков К., Сидорова Н., Терехова С., Шклярская Я., Шубина Г. Государственная Третьяковская галерея на Крымском Валу. Искусство XX века. Путеводитель. — М.: Paulsen, 2014. — P. 166—167. — 291 p. — ISBN 978-5-98797-080-5
