= Semyon Chuykov =

Soviet artist, painter and teacher (1902 - 1980)

Semyon Chiukov
- Семён Чуйков
- Born: 30 October [O.S. 17 October] 1902; Pishpek, Russian Empire
- Died: May 18, 1980 (aged 77)
- Resting place: Kuntsevo Cemetery
- Education: Vkhutemas
- Employer(s): Institute of Proletarian Fine Arts; Surikov Institute of Fine Arts
- Known for: Painter, graphic artist, poster artist
- Notable work: Daughter of Soviet Kirgizia
- Style: Socialist realism

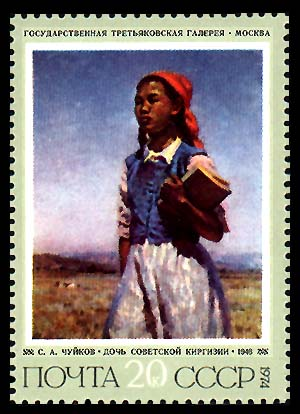
A stamp with the painting “Daughter of Soviet Kirgizia” circa 1974.

Semyon Afanasyevich Chuikov (Russian: Семён Афанасьевич Чуйков; 30 October 1902 – 18 May 1980) was a Soviet, Russian and Kyrgyz artist, painter, teacher. He held the title People's Artist of the USSR (1963) and a laureate of two Stalin Prizes (1949, 1951). He is one of the founders of modern fine art in Kyrgyzstan.

== Biography ==
Born in Pishpek (now Bishkek, Kyrgyzstan) to a Russian family. His father served as a military clerk.

In 1918–1919 he studied at the teachers' seminary in Verny under Nikolai Khludov, in 1920–1921 at the art school in Tashkent and in 1924–1930 at VKHUTEMAS (Robert Falk's workshop) in Moscow.

In 1930–1932 he taught at the Institute of Proletarian Fine Arts in Leningrad.

He began as a writer and essayist.

Since 1933, his entire creative life has been connected with Kyrgyzstan. He created an art museum, to the first funds of which the museums of Moscow and Leningrad transferred dozens of works by famous Russian and Soviet artists: Konstantin Korovin, Nicholas Roerich, Vasily Tropinin, Vasily Vereshchagin, etc.

In 1935, an art studio was opened in the republic, on the basis of which an art school was opened in 1939, which today is named after him.

Chuikov's first personal exhibition was held in 1938 in Moscow. He continued to create, and in 1939 the second personal exhibition of his works was held at the House of Writers in Moscow.

In the 1950–1960s, he traveled to various countries including India, Italy, France, Greece, Bulgaria. From these countries he brought back a wealth of material in the form of various sketches, pencil sketches. Genre paintings and landscapes dedicated to the people and nature of Kyrgyzstan, India (triptych "About the common people of India", 1957–1960).

In 1947–1948 he taught at the Moscow Surikov State Academic Institute of Fine Arts.

Chairman of the Organizing Committee of the Union of Artists of the Kirghiz SSR (1933), Chairman of the Union of Artists of the Kirghiz SSR (1934–1937, 1941–1943). In 1958 he became full member of the Academy of Arts of the Soviet Union. He was a members of the Artists' Union of the USSR.

In 1966, he signed the Letter of the Twenty Five to the General Secretary of the CPSU Central Committee Leonid Brezhnev against the rehabilitation of Joseph Stalin.

He spent the last years of his life in Russia, in Moscow. He was buried at the Kuntsevo Cemetery. He was married to Yevgenia Alekseyevna (1903–1984).

== Awards ==
- Gold medal of the USSR Academy of Arts (1980)[7]
- Satylganov State Prize of the Kirghiz SSR (1972) — for the cycle of paintings "In the Kirghiz SSR"
- Order of Lenin (1972)
- Nehru Prize (India, 1967)
- Medal "For Distinguished Labour" (1964)
- People's Artist of the USSR (1963)
- People's Artist of the RSFSR (1958)
- Order of the Red Banner of Labour (1958)
- Gold Medal of the World Exhibition in Brussels (1958) — for the paintings Daughter of Soviet Kirgizia and "Shepherd's Daughter"
- Stalin Prize, third degree (1951) — for the paintings "On the Peaceful Fields of My Homeland", "At the Foothills of the Tien Shan", "Morning on the State Farm"
- Stalin Prize, second degree (1949) — for the series of paintings "Kirghiz Kolkhoz Suite"
- People's Artist of the Kirghiz SSR (1944)
- Order of the Badge of Honour (June 7, 1939) — for outstanding services in the development of Kyrgyz theatrical art
- Honored Artist of the Kirghiz SSR (1938)
- Order of the Red Banner of Labour
- Order of the Badge of Honour
- Order of Cyril and Methodius, 1st Class (People's Republic of Bulgaria)
- Medal "For Valiant Labour in the Great Patriotic War 1941–1945"
- Jubilee Medal "In Commemoration of the 100th Anniversary of the Birth of Vladimir Ilyich Lenin"
