= Leontovich boundary condition =

The Shchukin-Leontovich boundary condition is a boundary condition in classical electrodynamics that relates to the tangential components of the electric E_{t} and magnetic H_{t} fields on the surface of well-conducting bodies.

== Definition ==
As originally formulated by Soviet physicists Alexander Shchukin and Mikhail Leontovich, the boundary condition is given as

$$\mathbf{E_t} = \zeta_s \mathbf{H_t}\times \hat{n},$$

where $\mathbf{E_t}$ and $\mathbf{H_t}$ represent the tangential components of the electric and magnetic fields, $\zeta_s = \sqrt{\mu/\epsilon}$ is the effective surface impedance, and $\hat{n}$ is a unit normal pointing into the conducting material. This condition is accurate when the conductivity of the conductor is large, which is the case for most metals. More generally, for cases when the radii of curvature of the conducting surface is large with respect to the skin depth, the resulting fields on the interior can be well approximated by plane waves, thus giving rise to the Shchukin-Leontovitch condition. A generalization of the Shchukin-Leontovich impedance boundary condition for a flat surface of a uniform half-space with an arbitrary dielectric constant, presented as a one-sided non-local relation, was formulated in.

== Applications ==
The Shchukin-Leontovich boundary condition is useful in many scattering problems where one material is a metal with large (but finite) conductivity. As the condition provides a relationship between the electric and magnetic fields at the surface of the conductor, without knowledge of the fields within, the task of finding the total fields is considerably simplified.
