= Arrived on vacation =

1948 painting by Fyodor Reshetnikov

- Artist: Fyodor Reshetnikov
- Year: 1948
- Medium: Oil on canvas
- Dimensions: 100 cm × 80 cm (39 in × 31 in)
- Location: Tretyakov Gallery; Moscow

"Arrived on vacation" (Russian: Прибыл на каникулы) is an oil-on-canvas painting by Soviet artist Fyodor Reshetnikov. It was painted in 1948 and is an example of socialist themes in art. It is located in the Tretyakov Gallery in Moscow. In 1949, the artist was awarded the Stalin Prize of the second degree.

Reshetnikov was popular as a caricaturist before this painting; "Arrived on vacation" thus was a valuable and successful experience in genre art for the artist.

The painting itself depicts a joyful event. A family greets a young boy, a returning Suvorov military cadet, who has come home for the New Year celebration and long holidays. The grandson, in military uniform, is happy – with a glowing face and a wide smile, he greets his grandfather with a mock military salute. His grandfather stands at attention, accepting the salute. The characters in the painting are the Suvorov military cadet, his grandfather, and a girl wearing a Pioneer tie, depicted with love and humor. The festive atmosphere in the house and the characters' charm highlight the painting's optimism, showing that the long war is over and a bright and happy future is ahead. On the other hand, the piece also has a sense of drama as the boy's parents are not depicted. The fact that after the war, children who had lost their relatives often enrolled in the Suvorov Military School, hints that they may not have survived.

"Arrived on vacation" brought Reshetnikov fame and has become one of his most well-known works. The painting has often been used in Russian-language classes to teach students how to write an essay; the Soviet school curriculum used the painting as an essay-writing topic for many years. The circulation of postcards featuring a reproduction of the painting totals over 13 million copies, much more than any other postcard in the former USSR.

Reshetnikov's famous 1952 painting, "Low Marks Again", contains a reproduction of "Arrived on vacation" on one of the walls. The artist also used a reproduction of "Low marks again" in his later painting "Reexamination".

A monument dedicated to graduates of Suvorov military schools and the cadet corps was unveiled at the St. Petersburg Suvorov Military School located at Sadovaya Street 26. The composition of the sculpture recreates the scene depicted in "Arrived on vacation": a young military man salutes his grandfather; the heroes of the monument also bear a resemblance to their prototypes. The monument was erected on the initiative of the commander of the Western Military District Anatoly Sidorov, a graduate of Suvorov School. The sculptor was Karen Sarkisov, who created the monument in commemoration of the 70th anniversary of the Suvorov and Nakhimov schools in Russia.
