= Boris Nemensky =

- Борис Неменский
- Born: December 22, 1922 (age 103); Moscow, USSR
- Education: Saratov Bogolyubov Art School; Surikov Moscow State Academic Art Institute
- Known for: Painter, graphic artist, poster artist
- Style: Socialist realism

Boris Mikhailovich Nemensky (Russian: Борис Михайлович Неменский; born 22 December 1922) is a Russian and Soviet painter.

== Biography ==
Born on December 24, 1922 in Moscow. His mother, Vera Semyonovna Parusnikova-Nemenskaya (née Parusnikova), dentist, daughter of a priest. After school, he studied at the Moscow Art School in Memory of 1905. In 1942, he graduated from the Saratov Art School and was drafted into the Red Army. He served in the Grekov Specialized Art Warehouse. He created a number of front-line drawings and sketches. In 1951, he graduated from the Surikov Moscow State Academic Art Institute. He taught at the Potemkin Moscow State Pedagogical Institute (1957-1960), and the Lenin Moscow State Pedagogical Institute (1960-1962). Corresponding Member of the Academy of Pedagogical Sciences of the Soviet Union since 1982, and a full member of the Russian Academy of Education since 1992. Since 1966, he has been a professor at the Gerasimov Institute of Cinematography Art Department. In 1966 he signed the Letter of the Twenty Five. He is the author of an original program for the aesthetic education of schoolchildren. He is a correspondent member of the Russian Academy of Arts since 2001 and a full member since 2007. His second wife, Larisa Aleksandrovna Nemenskaya (born 1955) is candidate of philosophical sciences, honorary member of the Russian Academy of Arts.

== Awards ==
- People's Artist of the RSFSR (October 9, 1986) — for services to the development of Soviet fine art.
- Honored Artist of the RSFSR (March 21, 1973) — for services to Soviet fine art.
- Stalin Prize, third degree (1951) — for the painting "About Far and Near" (1950)
- State Prize of the Russian Federation in Literature and Art for 1996 (awarded on May 29, 1997) — for the creation of a system of introduction to artistic culture.
- Prize of the President of the Russian Federation in Education for 2002 (October 5, 2003) — for the creation of a teaching aid kit on fine art for primary school "Fine Art and Artistic Work".
- Order "For Merit to the Fatherland", 3rd class (March 28, 2019) — for a major contribution to the development of national culture and art, mass media, and long-term creative activity.
- Order "For Merit to the Fatherland", 4th class (July 25, 2013) — for a major contribution to the development of national fine arts and long-term creative activity.
- Order of Cyril and Methodius, 1st class (People's Republic of Bulgaria).
- Medal "For the Victory over Germany in the Great Patriotic War 1941–1945".
- Medal "For Battle Merit".
- Treasury of the Motherland Award.
- Award "For Outstanding Contribution to the Development of Fine Arts" (2018).
- Sakura Award (Japan).
- L. N. Tolstoy Gold Medal (International Association of Children's Funds)
