= Letter of the Twenty Five =

Letter from 25 figures of Soviet science, literature and art to Leonid Brezhnev against the rehabilitation of Josef Stalin (Russian: Письмо 25 деятелей советской науки, литературы и искусства Л. И. Брежневу против реабилитации И. В. Сталина) known as the Letter of the Twenty Five (Russian: Письмо двадцати пяти) is an open letter from figures of science, literature and art, written on February 14, 1966 to Soviet leader Leonid Brezhnev about the inadmissibility of "partial or indirect rehabilitation of Joseph Stalin".

== Prerequisites ==
According to the authors of the letter, "in recent times, in some speeches and articles in our press, tendencies have emerged that are aimed, in fact, at the partial or indirect rehabilitation of Stalin." In connection with this, the authors of the message considered it their duty, on the eve of the 23rd Congress of the CPSU, to convey their opinion on this issue to the First Secretary of the CPSU Central Committee Leonid Brezhnev.

In the spring of 1966, Ernst Genry instructed Marlen Korallov to collect signatures for this letter from artists (this is how the signatures of Oleg Efremov, Marlen Khutsiev, Georgy Tovstonogov, Maya Plisetskaya, and Pavel Korin were obtained). Henry himself collected the signatures of famous physicists. As Sakharov recalled:

Now I assume that the initiative for our letter belonged not only to Ernest Genry, but also to his influential friends (where – in the party apparatus, or in the KGB, or somewhere else – I do not know). Henry was in no way a "dissident".

== Contents ==
In their letter, the cultural figures expressed their "deep concern" about the possibility of a partial revision of the decisions of the 20th and 22nd Congresses, after, in the authors' opinion, "truly terrible facts about Stalin's crimes" became known:

To this day, we have not learned of a single fact, not a single argument that would allow us to think that the condemnation of the personality cult was in any way wrong. On the contrary, it is difficult to doubt that a significant portion of the striking, truly terrible facts about Stalin's crimes, confirming the absolute correctness of the decisions of both congresses, have not yet been made public.

They spoke of Stalin's responsibility for the deaths of countless innocent people, the country's unpreparedness for the Great Patriotic War, and the departure from Leninist norms in party and state life. Stalin, in the opinion of the authors of the letter, "perverted the idea of communism". And “any attempt” to rehabilitate Stalin would have led to confusion “in the broadest circles” of Soviet society and youth, and would have complicated relations with the foreign intelligentsia and Western communist parties, who would have regarded it as "our capitulation to the Chinese".

== Reaction ==
Chairman of the KGB, Vladimir Semichastny reported in a note to the Central Committee of the CPSU on March 15.

The dissemination of information about the letter led to the fact that on March 25, 1966, another 13 figures in science and culture also sent a letter to the Presidium of the Central Committee under the title "Letter of the Thirteen", expressing their support for the authors of the letter of the twenty-five. The authors of the message added that "the rehabilitation of Stalin in any form would be a disaster for our country and for the entire cause of communism".

There was no visible reaction to the letters from the authorities, but at the following XXIII Congress of the CPSU there was no revision of the decisions of the XX and XXII Congresses on the condemnation of the personality cult of Stalin.

In his speech at the 23rd Congress of the Communist Party of the Soviet Union, the First Secretary of the Moscow City Committee Nikolai Egorychev stated: “Recently it has become fashionable... to seek out in the political life of the country some elements of so-called ‘Stalinism’, as a bogeyman, to frighten the public, especially the intelligentsia. We tell them: ‘It won't work, gentlemen!’”.

The letter of the twenty-five became one of the first political appeals signed by Academician Andrei Sakharov.

== Signatories ==
1. Lev Artsimovich, laureate of the Lenin Prize and Stalin Prize
2. Oleg Efremov, chief director of the Sovremennik Theatre
3. Pyotr Kapitsa, twice Hero of Socialist Labour, laureate of the Stalin Prizes
4. Valentin Katayev, member of the Writers' Union, laureate of the Stalin Prize
5. Pavel Korin, People's Artist of the USSR, laureate of the Stalin Prize, laureate of the Lenin Prize
6. Mikhail Leontovich, laureate of the Lenin Prize
7. Ivan Maisky, member of the Soviet Academy of Sciences
8. Viktor Nekrasov, member of the Writers' Union, laureate of the Stalin Prize
9. Boris Nemensky, member of the Artists' Union, laureate of the Stalin Prize
10. Konstantin Paustovsky, member of the Writers' Union
11. Yuri Pimenov, People's Artist of the RSFSR, twice laureate of Stalin Prize
12. Maya Plisetskaya, People's Artist of the USSR, Lenin Prize laureate
13. Andrei Popov, People's Artist of the USSR, Stalin Prize laureate
14. Mikhail Romm, People's Artist of the USSR, Stalin Prize laureate
15. S. N. Rostovsky (Ernst Genri), member of the Writers' Union, Vorovsky Prize laureate
16. Andrei Sakharov, three times Hero of Socialist Labour, Lenin and Stalin Prize laureate
17. Sergei Skazkin, Stalin Prize laureate
18. Boris Slutsky, member of the Writers' Union
19. Innokenty Smoktunovsky, member of the Cinematographers' Union, Lenin Prize laureate
20. Igor Tamm, Nobel Prize laureate, Hero of Socialist Labour, Lenin and Stalin Prize laureate
21. Vladimir Tendryakov, member of the Union writers
22. Georgy Tovstonogov, People's Artist of the USSR, laureate of the Lenin and two Stalin prizes
23. Marlen Khutsiev, Honored Artist of the RSFSR
24. Semyon Chuykov, People's Artist of the USSR, laureate of two Stalin prizes
25. Korney Chukovsky, member of the Writers' Union, laureate of the Lenin Prize
