= Mikhail Leontovich =

Soviet physicist

- Born: Mikhail Aleksandrovich Leontovich; 7 March 1903; Saint Petersburg, Russian Empire
- Died: 30 March 1981 (aged 78); Moscow, Soviet Union
- Education: Moscow State University
- Known for: Leontovich boundary condition
- Awards: Lenin Prize (1958)
- Scientific career
- Fields: Physics
- Workplaces: Moscow State University; Lebedev Physical Institute; Kurchatov Institute
- Academic advisors: Leonid Mandelstam
- Website: http://fpfe.mipt.ru/bazekafedras/ptf/ptf.html

Mikhail Aleksandrovich Leontovich (Russian: Михаил Александрович Леонтович; 7 March 1903 – 30 March 1981) was a Soviet physicist and member of Academy of Sciences of the Soviet Union, specializing in plasma and radiophysics.

Leontovich was born on 7 March 1903; his father, A. V. Leontovich, was physiologist and a member of the Ukrainian Academy of Sciences. His maternal grandfather, Viktor Kirpichov, was a physicist and a mechanical engineer. Having graduated from Moscow State University in 1923, he served as a member of the Commission for Kursk Magnetic Anomaly Research, as well as a professor at his alma mater. During his tenure, he was mentored by Leonid Mandelstam. He was elected as a Academy of Sciences of the Soviet Union in 1946 and was employed at the Kurchatov Institute from 1951 until his death in 1981.

Leontovich's research interests spanned radiophysics, plasma science and optics. Approximate impedance boundary conditions that he introduced for conducting materials is named after him. Alongside Vladimir Fock, he was among the first researchers to apply parabolic equation techniques to radio propagation. In addition to his research on electrodynamics, he made contributions to plasma stability and pinch, molecular light scattering, ultrasonics and non-equilibrium thermodynamics. Having made contributions to the experimental realization of the first Tokamak, he was awarded the Lenin Prize in 1958, as well as three Orders of Lenin and five Orders of the Red Banner of Labour.

During his career, Leontovich engaged in dissident activities, being a signatory to the Letter of the Twenty Five.

== Selected publications ==
Books

- Leontovich, M. A., ed. (1980). Reviews of Plasma Physics. New York: Consultants Bureau.

Book chapters

- Leontovich, M. A., "On the approximate boundary conditions for the electromagnetic field on the surface of well conducting bodies" . in B. A. Vvedensky, ed. Investigations on Radio Wave Propagation, Pt. 2. Moscow, USSR: Izd. Akad. Nauk SSSR, 1948, pp. 1-12.

Journal articles

- Leontovich, M. A. (1944). "On a method for solving problems of electromagnetic wave propagation along the Earth's surface". Izv. Akad. Nauk SSSR Ser. Fiz. 8 (1): 16–22.
- Leontovich, M. A.; Fock, V. A. (1946). "Solution of the problem of propagation of electromagnetic waves along the Earth's surface by the method of parabolic equation". Journal of Physics—USSR. 10: 13–23.
