= Kirghiz Soviet Socialist Republic =

Soviet republic from 1936 to 1991

Kirghiz Soviet Socialist Republic (1936–1990) Кыргыз Советтик Социалисттик Республикасы (Kyrgyz) Киргизская Советская Социалистическая Республика (Russian) Socialist Republic of Kyrgyzstan (1990–1991) Социалисттик Кыргызстан Республикасы (Kyrgyz) Социалистическая Республика Кыргызстан (Russian) Republic of Kyrgyzstan (1991) Кыргызстан Республикасы (Kyrgyz) Республика Кыргызстан (Russian)
- 1936–1991
- Flag (1952–1991) State emblem (1956–1991)
- Motto: Бардык өлкөлөрдүн пролетарлары, бириккиле! (Kyrgyz); Bardyk ölkölördün proletarlary, birikkile! (transliteration) "Workers of the world, unite!"
- Anthem: Кыргыз Советтик Социалисттик Республикасынын мамлекеттик гимни Kyrgyz Sovettik Sotsialisttik Respublikasynyn mamlekettik gimni Anthem of the Kirghiz Soviet Socialist Republic (from 1946)
- Location of Kirghizia (red) within the Soviet Union from 1956 to 1991
- Status: 1936–1990: Union republic of the Soviet Union; 1990–1991: Union Republic with priority of the Kirghiz legislation
- Capital: Frunze
- Common languages: Official languages: Kirghiz · Russian; Minority languages: Uzbek · Dungan
- Religion: State atheism
- Demonyms: Kirghiz; Soviet
- Government: Unitary communist state (1936–1990); Unitary presidential republic (1990–1991)
- First Secretary
  - 1936–1937 (first): Moris Belotsky
  - 1985–1990 (last): Absamat Masaliyev
- Head of state
  - 1936–1937 (first): Abdukadyr Urazbekov
  - 1990–1991 (last): Askar Akayev
- Head of government
  - 1936–1937 (first): Bayaly Isakeyev
  - 1991 (last): Andrei Iordan
- Legislature: Supreme Soviet
- History
  - Kirghiz ASSR formed: 1 February 1926
  - Elevation to a Union Republic: 5 December 1936
  - Osh riots: June 1990
  - Sovereignty declared: 30 December 1990
  - Renamed to the Republic of Kyrgyzstan: 5 February 1991
  - Independence declared: 31 August 1991
  - Kirghiz's international recognition (dissolution of the Soviet Union): 26 December 1991

Population
  - 1989 census: 4,290,442
- HDI (1990): 0.640 medium
- Currency: Soviet rouble (руб) (SUR)
- Calling code: +7 319/331/332/334/335
Preceded by	Succeeded by
Kirghiz ASSR	Kyrgyzstan

The Kirghiz Soviet Socialist Republic (Kirghiz SSR) (Note: Sometimes transliterated in contemporaneous sources as Kirgiz or retroactively as Kyrgyz.) (Note: Kyrgyz: Кыргыз Советтик Социалисттик Республикасы (Кыргыз ССР), romanized: Kyrgyz Sovettik Sotsialisttik Respublikasy (Kyrgyz SSR); Russian: Киргизская Советская Социалистическая Республика (Киргизская ССР), romanized: Kirgizskaya Sovetskaya Sotsialisticheskaya Respublika (Kirgizskaya SSR)) was one of the constituent republics of the Soviet Union (USSR) from 1936 to 1991. It was also known by the names Kyrgyzstan and Soviet Kyrgyzstan (Note: Kyrgyz: Кыргызстан, Советтик Кыргызстан, romanized: Kyrgyzstan, Sovettik Kyrgyzstan) in the Kyrgyz language, as well as Kirghizia and Soviet Kirghizia (Note: Russian: Киргизия, Советская Киргизия, romanized: Kirgiziya, Sovetskaya Kirgiziya) in the Russian language. Landlocked and mountainous, it bordered Tajikistan and China to the south, Uzbekistan to the west and Kazakhstan to the north. The Kirghiz branch of the Communist Party of the Soviet Union governed the republic from 1936 until 1990.

On 30 October 1990, the Kirghiz SSR was renamed to the Socialist Republic of Kyrgyzstan; on 15 December, after declaring its state sovereignty, it was renamed again to the Republic of Kyrgyzstan. On 31 August 1991, it transformed into independent Kyrgyzstan.

== Etymology ==
The name Kyrgyz is believed to have been derived from the Turkic word for forty, in reference to the forty clans of Manas, a legendary hero who united forty regional clans against the Uyghur Khaganate. The name Kyrgyzstan or Kirghizstan means 'land of the forty tribes', combined from three words: kyrg (kyrk) meaning 'forty', yz (uz) meaning 'tribes' in East Turkic, and -stan meaning 'land' in Persian. Politically, the name of the republic was the Kirghiz Soviet Socialist Republic as stated in the 1937 and 1978 constitutions.

From 30 October to 15 December 1990 it was renamed the Socialist Republic of Kyrgyzstan (or Kirghizia). Afterwards, the socialist prefix was dropped and it became the Republic of Kyrgyzstan. Officially, in Russian, the name of the country in Kyrgyz, Kyrgyzstan, began to be used instead of the Russian Kirghizia. Later, the official name of the state was changed to the Kyrgyz Republic, which was retained after independence.

== History ==
Established on 14 October 1924 as the Kara-Kirghiz Autonomous Oblast of the RSFSR, it was transformed into the Kirghiz ASSR (Kirghiz Autonomous Socialist Soviet Republic) on 1 February 1926, still being a part of the RSFSR. The borders were not drawn along ethnic or linguistic lines, however.

On 5 December 1936, with the adoption of the 1936 Soviet Constitution, it became a separate constituent republic of the USSR as the Kirghiz Soviet Socialist Republic during the final stages of the national delimitation in the Soviet Union.

At the time of formation of Kirghizia, its territory was divided into districts (raions). On November 21, 1939, five oblasts (regions) were created: Jalal-Abad, Issyk Kul, Osh, Tyan Shan, and Frunze Oblasts. In 1944, Talas Oblast was established from Frunze but was abolished in 1956. In 1959 the Frunze, Issyk-Kul and Jalal-Abad oblasts were abolished. Frunze and Issyk-Kul became territories under direct republic jurisdiction while Jalal-Abad was joined into Osh. Tyan Shan was the last oblast to be abolished in 1962, and by this point, the rest of the republic with the exception of Osh was divided into districts of republican subordination. In 1970, Issyk-Kul and Naryn (formerly Tien Shan) oblasts were restored, and in 1980 so was Talas. In 1988, the Naryn and Talas oblasts were again abolished; the former was merged with Issyk-Kul, while the later was merged with Osh. However, in 1990 they were restored and at the same time, Jalal-Abad and Chüy (formerly Frunze) were reestablished.

The Osh Massacre in 1990 undermined the position of the first secretary. That same year, on 15 December, the Kirghiz SSR was reconstituted as the Republic of Kyrgyzstan after declaring its sovereignty. On 17 March 1991, Kirghizia supported the Union preservation referendum with a 95.98% turnout.

However, this did not come to pass when the hardliners took control of Moscow for three days in August 1991. Askar Akayev, the first president, unequivocally condemned the putsch and gained fame as a democratic leader. The country declared its independence on 31 August 1991 and the Soviet Union was formally dissolved on 26 December 1991. However, the 1978 constitution remained in effect after its independence until 1993.

== Politics ==
Similar to that of the other Soviet republics, Kirghizia's government took place in the framework of a one-party socialist republic with the Communist Party of Kirghizia as the sole legal political party. The First Secretary of the Communist Party of Kirghizia served as the head of the party, while the Chairmen of the Presidium of the Supreme Soviet functioned as the executive heads of state and the Chairmen of the Council of Ministers led the legislative branch.

== Demographics ==
In 1926, the republic had a population of 1,002,000 people. In 1939, 1,458,000 people were recorded. The population grew significantly in the decades after World War II; the republic had 2,065,837 people in 1959, 2,932,805 people in 1970, and 3,529,030 people in 1979. In the final Soviet census of 1989, the republic had grown to 4,257,755 people. The majority of the population were ethnic Kyrgyz people. However, because large numbers were sent there in deportations, at times there were other significant ethnic groups. From March to May 1944 alone, it was reported in the Kremlin that 602,193 residents of the North Caucasus region had been deported to the Kirghiz and Kazakh SSRs, of which 496,460 were Chechens and Ingush, 68,327 of which were Karachays and 37,406 were Balkars. The majority of the Kyrgyz population are Muslims and speak a Turkic language. Bishkek had the largest concentration of Russians in the country, some 22% of the population by independence, with Uzbek minorities in the Fergana Valley especially constituting some 13% of the population. In 1990, violent clashes between the Uzbek and Kyrgyz peoples broke out in the Osh Region; ethnic tensions still remain in the region.

=== Religion ===
Under Soviet rule, Islam in Kirghizia was heavily suppressed, with people actively encouraging atheism. Soviet authorities permitted limited religious activity in all the majority-Muslim Soviet republics. Most of the Russian population of Kirghizia were atheist or Russian Orthodox. After independence, the country enjoyed greater religious freedom and remains to this day a secular state.

== Geography ==
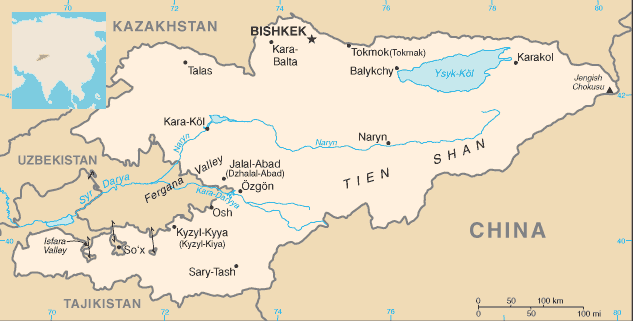
A map of modern Kyrgyzstan, with the same borders as the former Kirghizia

Kirghizia, a landlocked republic in Soviet Central Asia shared its borders with Kazakhstan, Tajikistan and Uzbekistan as well as China on the outside lying between latitudes 39° and 44° N, and longitudes 69° and 81° E. It is farther from the sea than any other individual country, and all its rivers flow into closed drainage systems which do not reach the sea. The mountainous region of the Tian Shan covers over 80% of the country, with the remainder made up of valleys and basins.

Issyk-Kul Lake, or Ysyk-Köl in Kyrgyz, in the north-eastern Tian Shan is the largest lake in Kyrgyzstan and the second largest mountain lake in the world after Titicaca. The highest peaks are in the Kakshaal Too range, forming the Chinese border. The Jengish Chokusu peak, at 7,439 m (24,406 ft), is the highest point and is considered by geologists to be the northernmost peak over 7,000 m (22,966 ft) in the world. Heavy snowfall in winter leads to spring floods which often cause serious damage downstream. The runoff from the mountains is also used for hydro-electricity.

== Culture ==
Many elements of Kyrgyz culture persisted through the Soviet period, including:

- Manas, an epic poem
- Komuz, a three-stringed lute
- Tush kyiz, large, elaborately embroidered wall hangings
- Shirdak, flat cushions made in shadow-pairs
- Other textiles, especially made from felt
- Falconry

=== Traditions ===
Apart from celebrating the New Year each 1 January, Kirghizia, like all Soviet Republics, observed the Great October Socialist Revolution on 7 November. Its festivals and traditions such as Nowruz and Ulak Tartish were suppressed by the Soviet authorities.

The tradition of bride kidnapping, which remains illegal to this day, was suppressed by the Soviet regime. It is debatable whether bride kidnapping is actually traditional. Some of the confusion may stem from the fact that arranged marriages were traditional, and one of the ways to escape an arranged marriage was to arrange a consensual "kidnapping".

== Legacy ==
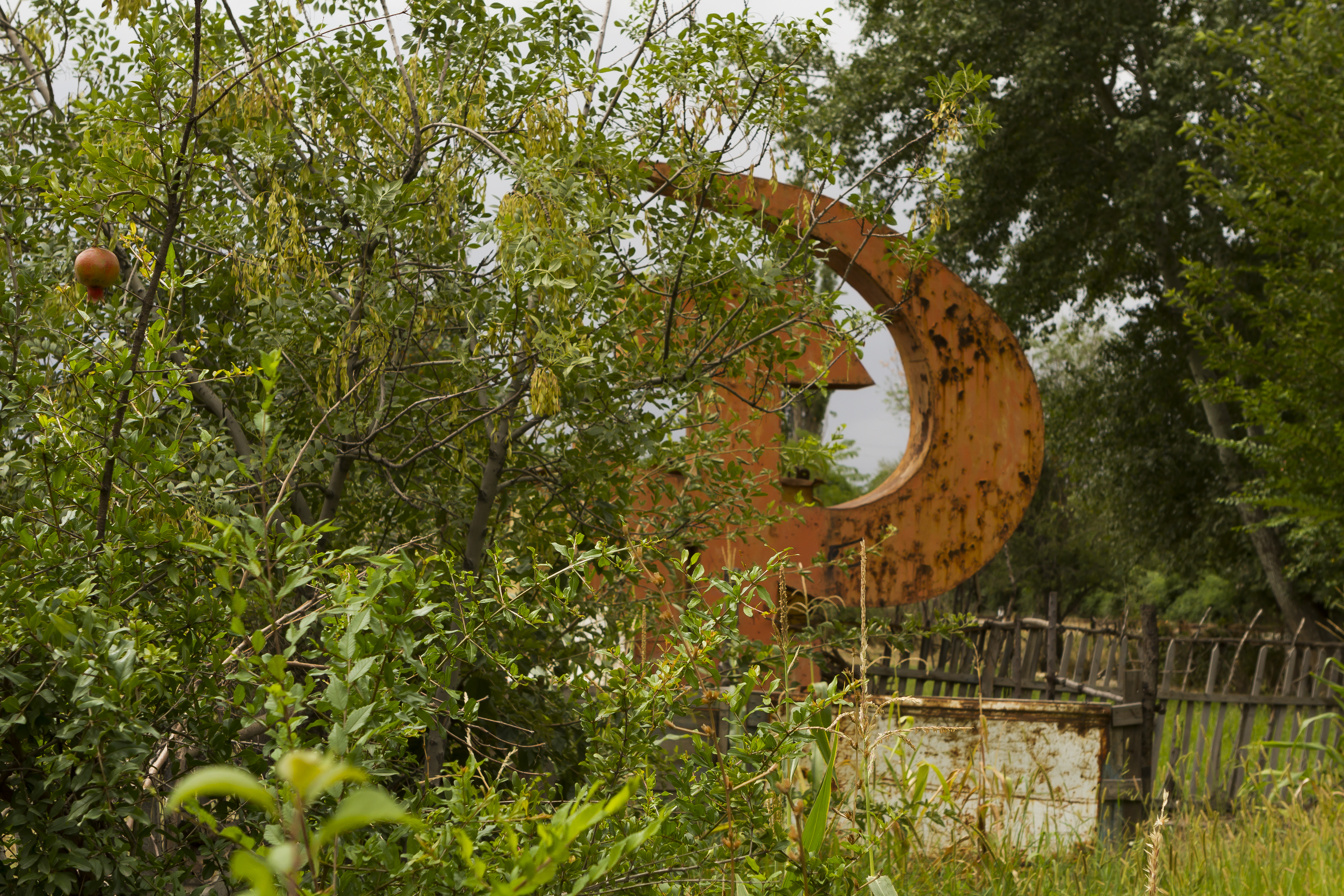
Rusted Soviet hammer and sickle in Kyrgyzstan

According to a 2013 Gallup poll, 62% of Kyrgyz people said that the collapse of the Soviet Union harmed their country, while only 16% said that the collapse benefited it. The poll also showed that well-educated Kyrgyz people were more likely to say that the breakup harmed their country.

== See also ==
- Leadership of Communist Kyrgyzstan
- Interhelpo
- Daughter of Soviet Kirgizia (painting)
