= Fyodor Reshetnikov (painter) =

Fyodor Pavlovich Reshetnikov (Russian: Фёдор Павлович Решетников; 28 July [O.S. 15 July] 1906 – 13 December 1988) was a prominent Soviet painter. A preeminent practitioner of socialist realism, Reshetnikov was recognized by the government for his work and was a member for three and a half decades of the Soviet Academy of Arts. His creations are held in Russia's finest collections, including the Tretyakov Gallery (Moscow), the Russian Museum (Saint Petersburg), the State Historical Museum (Moscow), and others.

== Early life ==
Reshetnikov was born in Sursko-Lytovske village, Russian Empire in what is now Dnipropetrovsk Oblast, Ukraine, into a family of icon painters. Orphaned at an early age, Reshetnikov was raised by his brother, who painted church frescoes and icons for a living, and who employed Reshetnikov as an apprentice.

Having never attended secondary school, Reshetnikov enrolled in a remedial "Rabfak" institution as preparation for attending Moscow's elite art college VKHUTEIN.

== Arctic expeditions ==
While still an art student, Reshetnikov's prowess in realist representation procured him a position as resident "artistic reporter" on two arctic expeditions in 1932–34: the first, with famous explorer Otto Schmidt on the Sibiryakov; the other, on the doomed Chelyuskin which sank in 1934. Reshetnikov was one of the people rescued from the ice after the Chelyuskin sank.

== Artistic career ==
Beginning in the late 1940s, Reshetnikov emerged as one of the Soviet Union's best known socialist realists. He specialized in two types of paintings: depictions of Soviet leadership (his several drawings of Stalin were favored by the dictator) and of ordinary lives. Children were particularly common in his paintings. The most famous of his works depicting children is Arrived on vacation (Прибыл на каникулы) (1948), Low Marks Again (Опять двойка) (1952), Reexamination (Переэкзаменовка) (1954).

Throughout his life, Reshetnikov opposed formalism in art, exposing it wherever he found it since he believed it was part of imperialist ideology. In 1963, Reshetnikov published illustrated book “The Secrets of Abstract art”, which caricatured and exposed it. His views were popular with the authorities and he became an appointed member of the Academy of Arts in 1953 and its vice-president in 1974. Reshetnikov received many prestigious governmental awards for his contributions to Soviet culture, including the Stalin Prize.

Reshetnikov taught art in two Moscow colleges from 1953 until 1962. In 1963, he authored a book (Secrets of Abstractionism, Тайны абстракционизма), in which he expounded his negative views of "bourgeois" artistic movements.

Reshetnikov died in Moscow in 1988, aged 82.

== Literature ==
- L. Yevgrafova (Евграфова Л.), Fyodor Pavlovich Reshetnikov (Федор Павлович Решетников), Perm, 1961
- Fyodor Reshetnikov (album), "Izobrazitelnoe iskusstvo" pub., Moscow, 1982

== External sources ==
- Biography from the Ministry of Education website (in Russian)
- Biography from the "Krugosvet" encyclopedia (in Russian)
