= Low Marks Again =

1952 painting by Fyodor Pavlovich Reshetnikov

- Artist: Fyodor Reshetnikov
- Year: 1952
- Medium: Oil-on-canvas
- Dimensions: 101 cm × 93 cm (40 in × 37 in)
- Location: Tretyakov Gallery, Moscow

Low Marks Again (Russian: Опять двойка, translated as Grade D, Again) is a painting by Fyodor Pavlovich Reshetnikov, produced in 1952.

Due to the work's realistic scenario, the Soviet school curriculum used the painting as a topic for essay-writing. The painting was well known to the Soviet public.

"Low Marks Again" contains a reproduction of Reshetnikov's painting "Arrived on vacation" (1948) on one of the walls. The artist also used a reproduction of "Low marks again" in his later painting "Reexamination".
