= Yuri Pimenov (painter) =

- Юрий Пименов
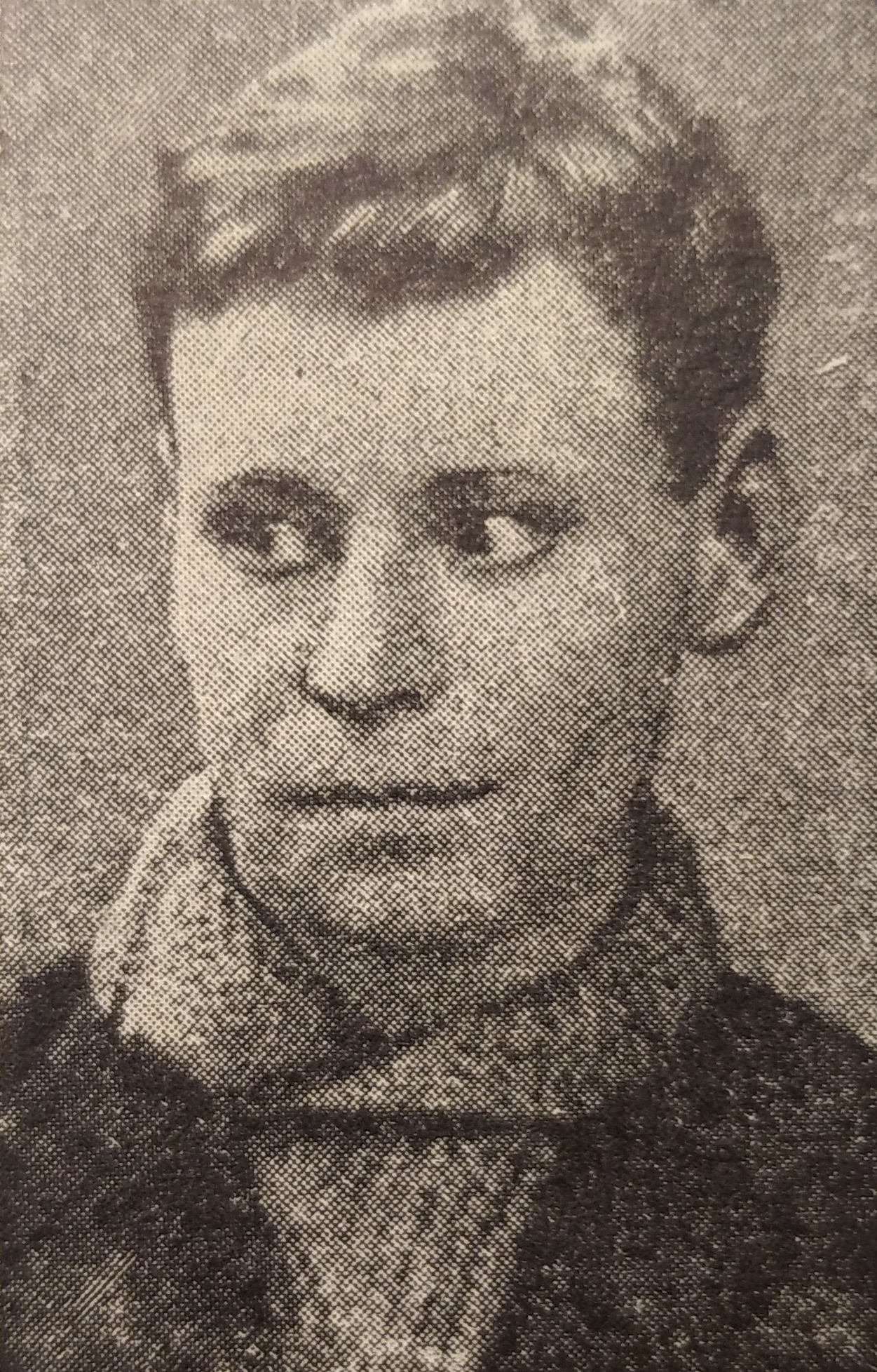
- Born: 13 November [O.S. 26 November] 1903; Moscow, Russian Empire
- Died: September 6, 1977 (aged 73); Moscow
- Resting place: Novodevichy Cemetery
- Education: 10th Moscow Gymnasium
- Alma mater: VKHUTEMAS
- Known for: Painter, graphic artist, set designer, poster artist
- Style: Socialist realism
- Awards: Stalin's Prize; Lenin Prize; Order of Lenin; Order of the Red Banner of Labour; Medal "For Valiant Labour in the Great Patriotic War 1941–1945"; Medal "In Commemoration of the 800th Anniversary of Moscow"

Yuri Pimenov (Russian: Юрий Иванович Пименов; November 13, 1903 – September 6, 1977) was a Soviet Russian artist painter, graphic artist, set designer, poster artist, teacher. An academician of the Academy of Arts of the Soviet Union (1962; Corresponding Member 1954), he held the title People's Artist of the USSR (1970) and was a laureate of two Stalin Prizes of the second degree (1947, 1950) and the Lenin Prize (1967).

== Biography ==
He was born on November 13 (26), 1903 in Moscow to the family of an assistant attorney Ivan Vasilyevich Pimenov and Klavdiya Mikhailovna Pimenova, who came from the Moscow merchant family of Babanin.

From the age of 7 he studied at the 10th Moscow Gymnasium. In 1915, on the recommendation of the gymnasium drawing teacher Alferov, he was enrolled in the Zamoskvoretskaya School of Drawing and Painting. In 1920-1925 he studied at the VKHUTEMAS in the painting and printing departments under Vladimir Favorsky and Sergey Malyutin:

I studied with Malyutin, Shemyakin, Falileev and am very grateful to them. But I studied most of my time at VKHUTEMAS with Favorsky and - perhaps without right - I want to consider myself his student…

From 1923 he worked for magazines: he made illustrations for the magazines Krasnaya Niva, Prozhektor; then - Samolet, 30 Dney, Soviet Screen and others. However, easel painting was in first place for him at that time; after completing his studies in 1925, he became one of the founders of the Easel Painters’ Society (OST). In January 1931, part of OST formed the Izobrigada artists’ society, of which Pimenov was a founding member. He was also a member of the Association of Artists of Revolutionary Russia. In 1928 he visited Italy and Germany.

In his early period he was greatly influenced by German expressionism, which largely explains the heart-rending dramatic intensity of his best paintings of those years: "War Invalids" (1926, Russian Museum), "Give Us Heavy Industry!" (1927); "Soldiers Go Over to the Side of the Revolution" (1932; both in the Tretyakov Gallery).

In 1932, the "Resolution on the Restructuring of Literary and Artistic Organizations" was issued, which immediately terminated the activities of all associations, including the "Izobrigada"; hard times came for Pimenov, which he recalled:

"... These were my hard times. My nerves were frayed, I could not work at all. In addition, I also suffered professional misfortunes: one book that I illustrated was considered formalistic for its drawings, and I found myself without money and without work, since after this book I was not given work in magazines, and we existed on the money that my wife earned as a stenographer

The result was that Pimenov re-evaluated his work. In the 1930s, the main theme of his work became the city; in 1937, he created one of his most famous works - the painting "New Moscow" (Tretyakov Gallery), which fully revealed the artist's updated, lighter, freer manner of painting. He moved on to updated impressionism, professing the creative principle of a "beautiful moment", a light and artistic image-impression. He worked in theatrical and decorative art, illustrated books, and did monumental and decorative works (panels). He received a gold medal for his panel "The Stakhanovite Movement" for the USSR pavilion at the 1937 World Exhibition in Paris. He became a master of advertising film posters, in which he used elements of easel art. In 1936-1937 he taught at the Moscow Institute for Advanced Studies of Artists.

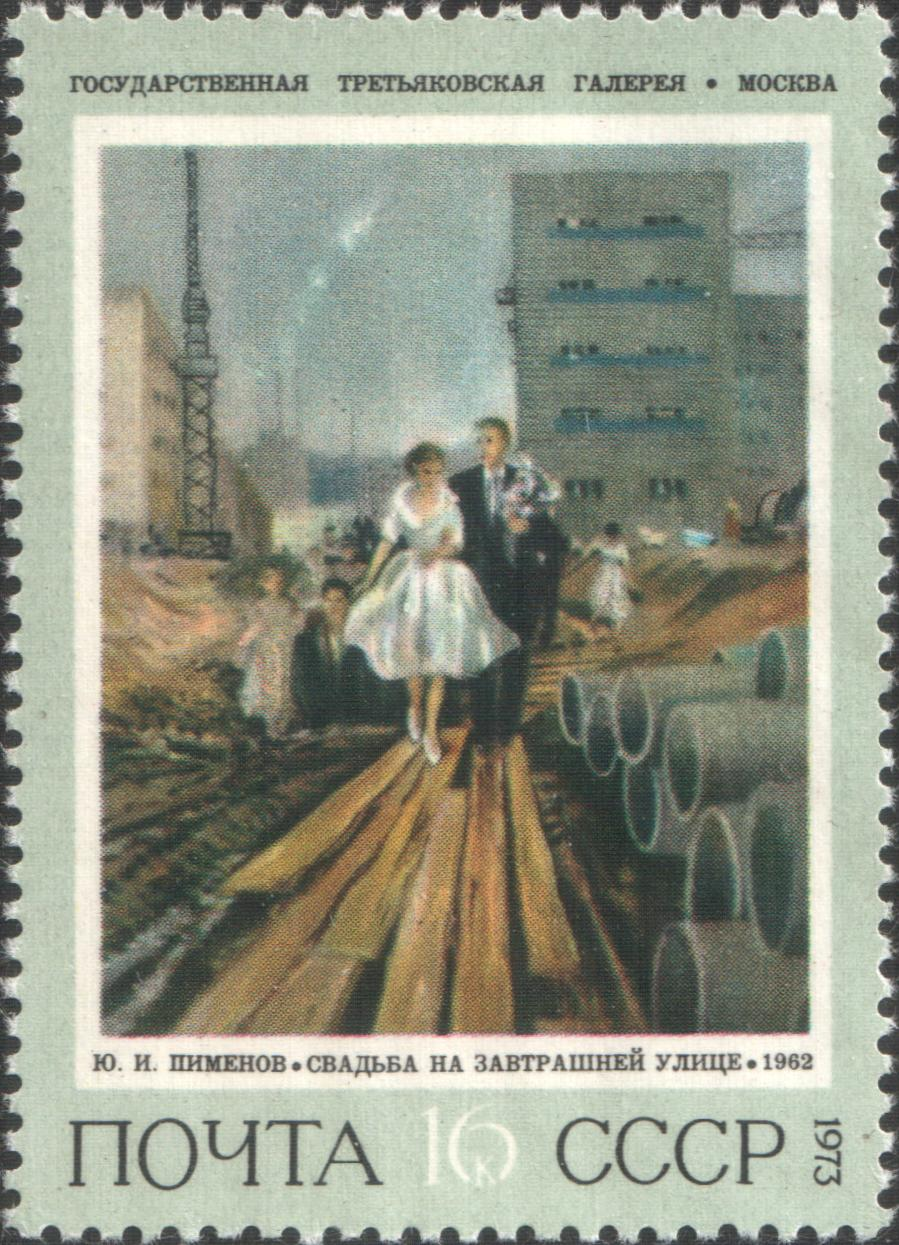
Wedding on tomorrow's street, 1962, on a 1973 Soviet postage stamp

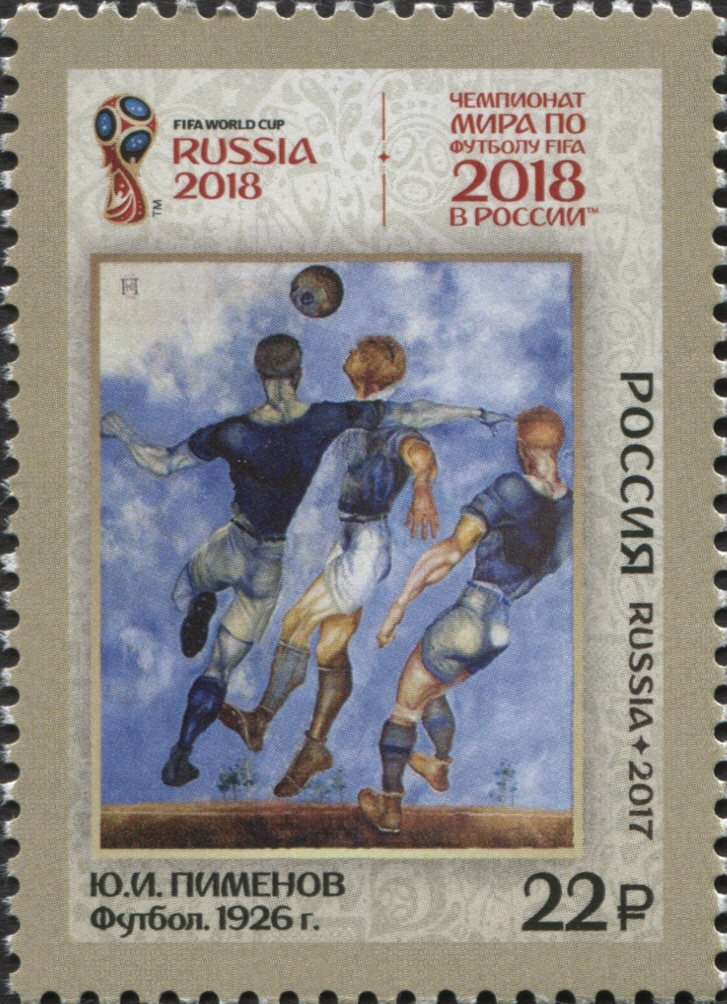
Football, 1926, on a 2017 Russian postage stamp

He designed the performances - "The Master from Clamecy" by Dmitry Kabalevsky (Mikhailovsky Theatre, Leningrad, 1938), "Cyrano de Bergerac" by Edmond Rostand (Lenkom Theatre, Moscow, 1943), "The Piggy Bank" by Eugène Labiche and A. Delacroix (Central Theater of the Red Army, Moscow, 1945), "For Those Who Are at Sea!" of Boris Lavrenyov (Lenkom Theatre, Moscow, 1946), "The Steppe is Wide" by Nikolai Vinnikov (1949), "Under a Foreign Sky" by B. R. Izakov (1951), "Sergey Lazo" by E. M. Bondareva (1952), "Spring Stream" by Yuli Chepurin (1953) - all Central Theatre of the Soviet Army, Moscow, the ballet "Snegurochka" by Pyotr Ilyich Tchaikovsky (Festival Ballet, London, 1960–61), "The Cherry Orchard" by Anton Chekhov (Central Theatre of the Soviet Army, 1965) and others.

In 1941-1945 during the Great Patriotic War he worked at TASS news agency. In 1943 he was sent to the Northwestern Front, to the Staraya Russa and Leningrad areas. He created a series of works on military themes. Another main theme in his work at this time was the depiction of heroes of the home front. In 1949, as an artist, he worked on the set of the film Cossacks of the Kuban.

In 1945–1972, he taught at the art department at Gerasimov Institute of Cinematography, professor since 1947. In 1954, he was elected a corresponding member, in 1962 - a full member of the USSR Academy of Arts. He was also a member of the Artists' Union of the USSR.

In 1966, he signed the Letter of the Twenty Five cultural and scientific figures to the General Secretary of the CPSU Central Committee Leonid Brezhnev against the rehabilitation of Josef Stalin.

He died on September 6, 1977, in Moscow and was buried at the Novodevichy Cemetery. In 1931 he married Natalya Konstantinovna Bernadskaya. According to the State Museum Catalogue of Russia, as of the beginning of 2024, 309 works by the artist are stored in the collections of Russian museums.
