= Evgeny Teis =

Evgeny Sergeevich Teis
- Born: 1900; Samara, Russian Empire
- Died: 1981 (aged 80–81); Moscow, USSR
- Education: VKHUTEMAS (graduate)
- Known for: Painting, Graphic arts
- Notable work: Still lifes; landscapes; graphic works

Evgeny Teis was a Soviet painter and graphic artist.

== Biography ==
=== Early life ===
Evgeny Sergeevich Teis was born in 1900 in Samara, Russia. From 1911 he attended Sunday drawing and watercolours classes in Saratov, and in 1913 enrolled at the Bogolyubov Drawing School in Saratov. In 1916 he relocated to Tiflis (now Tbilisi) and studied at the art school of O. I. Shlefling; simultaneously he worked as a decorator at the Tiflis Opera under A. A. Saltzmann. Between 1921 and 1929 he studied at the famous VKHUTEMAS in Moscow in the Polygraphic/Graphic faculty, under teachers including V. A. Favorsky, I. I. Nivinsky, P. Y. Pavlinov, P. Miturich.

Teis participated in the decoration and design of Lenin's Mausoleum under the direction of his teacher Nivinsky. The temporary wooden mausoleum was completed January 27, 1924, with interior decoration combining black and red designed by Nivinsky.

=== Career ===
Following his studies, Teis worked in applied art and graphics: in the mid-1930s he carried out decorative/design work for the Polytechnic Museum and the All-Union Agricultural Exhibition in Moscow. From 1934 he began teaching: at the Institute for Advanced Training of Graphic Artists in Moscow, and later at Vsehudozhnik. In the years 1944-47 he taught at the Moscow Architectural Institute; between 1952-56 he taught drawing at the Stroganov Moscow State University of Arts and Industry (formerly Stroganov school). He led the Studio of I. I. Nivinsky (etching/graphics) from 1955 to 1967. Teis was a member of the Union of Artists of the USSR. He died in 1981 in Moscow.

== Style ==
Evgeny Teis’s artistic style reflects the fusion of painterly sensitivity and graphic precision characteristic of artists trained at VKHUTEMAS–VKHUTEIN during the 1920s. His early formation in drawing and watercolor at the Bogolyubov Drawing School in Saratov (from 1913) gave him a solid foundation in tonal gradation and compositional clarity, visible throughout his later still lifes and landscapes. Works such as Still Life with Fruit and Landscape (1930s) demonstrate a sense of structure and surface balance rather than painterly flourish.

After completing studies at VKHUTEMAS’s Polygraphic Faculty (1921–1929), under mentors including Vladimir Favorsky, Ivan Nivinsky, Pavel Pavlinov, and Pyotr Miturich, Teis developed a distinct approach to etching and printmaking. The influence of these teachers is evident in his disciplined linework, controlled tonal contrasts, and the fusion of drawing with printing processes. His ability to treat oil, watercolor, and etched lines interchangeably gave his work an unmistakable graphic clarity. Even in oil paintings, the treatment of contours and light resembles etched plates.

Throughout the 1930s–1950s, Teis balanced fine art and applied decorative design, contributing to large public projects such as the Polytechnic Museum and the All-Union Agricultural Exhibition (VSKhV) in Moscow. His experience in applied graphics informed his sense of rhythm and surface texture, aligning his art with the Soviet decorative-realist idiom—accessible in subject yet refined in technique. His preferred themes included fruit still lifes, flower arrangements, and rural or suburban landscapes, handled in a modest scale with subtle tonal harmony rather than grand narrative.

As head of the I. I. Nivinsky Etching Studio (1955–1967), Teis significantly influenced Soviet printmaking pedagogy [9]. He trained younger artists—including the noted graphic artist Boris Kocheishvili—in etching and mixed techniques, promoting experimentation within a disciplined framework. His own work from this period reveals a mature synthesis of craft and experimentation, using etching as a means to explore textural and spatial variations rather than replication.

Formally, Teis’s works are distinguished by linear precision, tonal subtlety, and balanced spatial organisation. He often combined oil and watercolor with etched overlays, resulting in pieces that occupy a liminal space between painting and print. His restrained color palette—dominated by greys, ochres, and earth tones—reflects the pedagogical emphasis on structure over expression. Even when depicting everyday subjects, he maintained an architectural sense of proportion and economy of means. While Teis did not pursue the monumental Socialist Realism of his contemporaries, his art embodies a quieter, craft-based modernism rooted in observation, discipline, and the dignity of manual technique. His contribution lies less in iconography than in sustaining the Soviet graphic-arts lineage linking VKHUTEMAS to postwar printmaking. His influence persisted through the etching studios of Moscow, where many of his students continued to work within the aesthetic framework he helped establish.

== Exhibitions ==
=== Solo ===
- 2001 "Evgeny Teis, retrospective". State Tretyakov Gallery, Moscow.

=== Group ===
As a member of Union of Artists USSR since 1939, Teis regularly participated in official Union exhibitions throughout his entire career. The Union organized exhibitions at regional and national levels.
