= Fyodor Bogorodsky =

Russian painter (1895 – 1959)

Fyodor Semionovich Bogorodsky
- Born: June 2, 1895; Nizhny Novgorod, Russian Empire
- Died: November 3, 1959 (aged 64); Moscow, Soviet Union
- Known for: Painter

Fyodor Semyonovich Bogorodsky (Russian: Фёдор Семёнович Богородский; 2 June 1895, Nizhny Novgorod – 3 November 1959, Moscow) was a Russian/Soviet artist, and an Honored Art Worker of the RSFSR.

Bogorodsky was a proponent of the Association of Artists of Revolutionary Russia (AARR). In the 1920s, he participated in the "Fire-color" Association, which also consisted of Arkhipov, Zhekulina, Dobuzhinsky, Petrov-Vodkin, Voloshin, and other major artists of the time.

His 1945 painting, Glory to Fallen Heroes, won the Stalin Prize, and appeared on a 1965 Soviet postage stamp. He authored the book, Reminiscences of an Artist.
