= Alexander Grigoriev (artist) =

Mari Soviet artist, public figure and academician

- Александр Григорьев
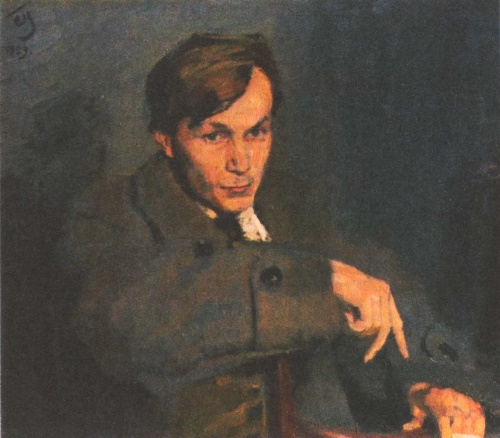
- Portrait by Sergey Malyutin, 1923
- Born: 28 May 1891; Pertnury, Kozmodemyansky Uyezd, Kazan Governorate, Russian Empire (now Gornomariysky District, Mari El, Russia)
- Died: 25 August 1961 (aged 70); Moscow, USSR
- Education: Moscow School of Painting, Sculpture and Architecture; Kazan Art School
- Known for: Painting, Drawing, Academician
- Movement: Realism
- Spouse: Evgenia Baklanova

Alexander Vladimirovich Grigoriev (Russian: Александр Владимирович Григорьев; 28 May 1891 – 25 August 1961), was a Mari Soviet artist, public figure and academician. He is considered to be the first-renowned and the greatest Mari artist, who contributed to the development and formation of the fine arts in the Mari Territory.

Grigoriev studied at Moscow School of Painting, Sculpture and Architecture with artists such as Ilya Mashkov and Abram Arkhipov; he travelled throughout the Soviet Union with Ilya Y. Repin, helping great painters as Nicolai Fechin. Grigoriev dedicated his life to art. Following the realism movement, Grigoriev painted genre paintings, portraits, landscapes and still lifes.

Through his national initiatives, Grigoriev became one of the most significant figures of Soviet Art in the 1920s. As founder of the Association of Artists of Revolutionary Russia, he influenced the art of the USSR throughout its existence. The A.V. Grigoriev Art and History Museum is part of his legacy; his dream was to make it the "Small Tretyakov Gallery".

== Biography ==
=== Early life ===
Grigoriev was born on May 28, 1891, in the village of Petnury, Kozmodemyansk, to a family of rural intellectuals. His father was a teacher from a peasant background who, realizing the importance of education, enabled his son to continue his primary education in the provincial Kazan. At first, it was a teachers' seminary. From an early age, Alexander Grigoriev began to show great interest in visual arts. This was the period of the formation of the national fine arts. Art education was quite rare among Mari painters; Grigoriev was one of the first artists from Mari to receive a visual arts education.

Alexander, who discovered a great craving for painting, was attracted by art, and not a teacher's path. Therefore, he entered at the Kazan Art School (1910 - 1915), the major place of education and artistic culture of the Volga-Vyatka Territory. He studied under the guidance of his teachers, P.P. Benkov and the famous artist Nicolai Fechin. During this period, Alexander participated in a first exhibition in 1914.

Grigoriev received further art education at the Moscow School of Painting, Sculpture and Architecture (1915-1917). Over that time, the future artist studies in the workshops of famous artists including Ilya Mashkov, Konstantin Korovin, Abram Arkhipov, and Vasily Meshkova. Strong ties will more than once unite the artist with his teachers: Grigoriev, later occupying leading positions in Moscow, Grigoriev was capable of supporting the old artistic intelligentsia to better their work.

=== Career ===
==== Returned to his homeland ====
In 1919, Grigoriev returned to Kozmodemyansk with his young wife, Muscovite Evgenia Baklanova. He immediately became an active workers of the region. As the head of the Volost department of public education, he contributed to the opening of a decorative art workshop. The first local art exhibition was organized and an art school was created.

Grigoriev believed his compatriots needed artistic enlightenment, and for this reason he planned to dedicate his life to art. He also wanted to open a small version of the Tretyakov Gallery in his hometown. Seeing the paintings of the Volga-Kama exhibition, Grigoriev decided to organize a museum in the city, which became the first museum to open in the Volga-Vyatka region in the post-revolutionary years.

During his work in the Mari Territory, Grigoriev proved himself to be an excellent draftsman, a master of pencil portraits. This manifested itself in the portraits of people close to him and public figures ("Portrait of Father" - 1919, "Portrait of S. Loktev", "Portrait of Alafuzov" - 1920).

==== A national artist engaged ====
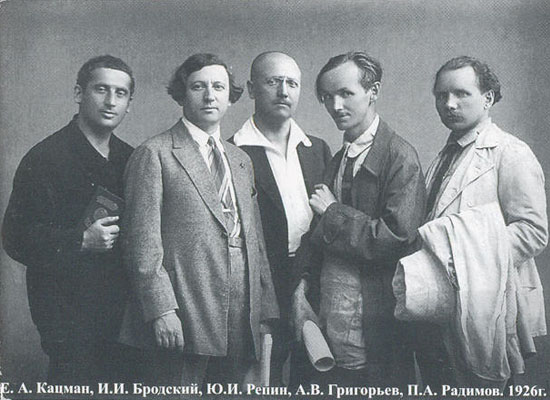
A.V. Grigoriev in 1926 with the members of AHRR

In 1922, Grigoriev was summoned to Moscow. The Soviet Union state was rebuilding the principles of new art, education and museums. Grigoriev worked in the Department for Museums and Protection of Art and Antiquity Monuments of the People's Commissariat for Education.

In the same year, Grigoriev, together with the chairman of the Itinerant Association and several other like-minded people, founded the Association of Artists of Revolutionary Russia (AARR), which had an important influence on art of the Soviet period. From 1923 to 1927, Grigoriev was elected as the chairman of the AHRR, which later influenced all Soviet art. In 1928, Grigoriev founded the Union of Soviet Artists and became the chairman until 1932.

While living in the capital, Grigiriev acquired 50 paintings by famous artists, sculpture and porcelain for the Kozmodemyansk Museum. Grigoriev's close acquaintance with Nicolai Fechin contributed to the acquisition of his works. In 1923, during Fechin's departure to America, Alexander bought several works from him for the Kozmodemyansk Museum, and Fechin gave him sketches for the "Cheremis Wedding".

==== The turning point ====
In the beginning of 1930s, A. Grigoriev was Deputy Director of the Tretyakov Gallery, art editor of the State Publishing House Gosizdat and member of the USSR Union of Artists since 1932.

From 1934, Grigoriev lived with his family in the city of Tarusa, Kaluga. The same year, he was the Chairman of the All-Russian Union of Cooperative Associations of Fine Arts Works, which took over the organization of material and creative support of artists, the organization of creative business trips and exhibitions. Despite this function, in his autobiography, "From 1934 to 1938, artist, creative work is the main occupation". Grigoriev held an exhibition of his works in 1934 but during this period, his health began to deteriorate.

At this time, the repression of the 1930s continued to gain momentum. At the beginning of 1937, many military leaders, scientists, and cultural figures were arrested. The threat also hung over the Union of Soviet Artists. One night in November 1937, Grigoriev was arrested and convicted of anti-Soviet activities. Grigoriev spent almost 9 years in the Karaganda labor camp, in one of the state farms of the NKVD. The label "enemy of the people" dramatically changed his life. The name of Grigoriev was removed from the Kozmodemyansk Museum and from books for decades, and even his face was removed from photographs that were published in the literature about the AHRR. Grigoriev knew many statesmen of the Soviet Union, including Marshal of the Soviet Union Kliment Voroshilov. Having come under reprisals, he wrote to Voroshilov to a request to review his case, but this did not bring any results.

==== A new life begins ====
After Grigoriev's his releaee in 1946, the label "enemy of the people" was not removed. Despite his family living in Moscow, he was still banned from the capital so he went to the Kaluga region, in Tarusa, where he lived for ten years and was forgotten by virtually everyone, except for a few of his friends and artists who tried to help because Grigoriev was in poverty.

In mid-1947, Grigoriev sent a letter to Liza Ancelovich, a woman he met in Karlag, saying he had settled in Tarusa, not far from Moscow. He wrote; "Friends, they say, helped to equip the workshop, provided everything necessary to be able to work again. I'm trying to start life over again ... It's simple: they took, tortured and released. Live, since you have already survived ..." Grigoriev said about himself: "The smoking room is alive - the flesh is weak, but the spirit is vigorous".

For several years Grigoriev lived there, in a house that was dilapidated by the Germans, earning money by writing signs for snack bars and cafes.

==== Legitimacy and recognition from his nation ====
The label "enemy of people" followed Grigoriev until the early 1950s. In one of the books about Ilya Y. Repin, instead of Grigoriev sitting next to Repin, a vase was imprinted. The artist was rehabilitated in 1954.

After the XX Congress of the Communist Party of the Soviet Union, those who survived Stalinism awaited rehabilitation, lifetime or posthumous; "By the decision of the Military Collegium of the Supreme Court of the USSR dated June 16, 1954, Grigoriev A.V. rehabilitated on the basis of a 1939 conviction" reads a certificate from the FSB of the Russian Federation. Later, Grigoriev was reinstated in the ranks of the Communist Party.

After rehabilitation, Grigoriev was openly remembered as the chairman of the AHRR, and was invited to an expanded meeting of the USSR Academy of Arts. In 1956, Grigoriev was assigned a life-long pension of all-Union significance; in the same year he was elected a delegate to the 1st Congress of Soviet Artists. Grigoriev was awarded the honorary title of Honored Art Worker of the Mari ASSR in August 1960.

=== Later life ===
Alexander Grigoriev died on August 25, 1961, and was buried at the Novodevichy Cemetery in Moscow. His wife and friend Evgenia Grigoriev is also buried here. Grigoriev did not forget about his "Small Tretyakov Gallery", the fund of which was replenished with his help. This continued until 1961, the last year in the artist's life. Subsequently, the museum remained supported. Both the official bodies and artists handed over the work to him. On October 14, 1966, his name, taken away during the years of repression, was returned to the museum in Kozmodemyansk. A sculptural bust of Grigoriev was erected in his memory.

Today, the State Prize of the Republic of Mari El in the field of fine arts are named after Alexander Grigoriev. His works can be seen in the Tretyakov Gallery, the Russian Museum, and in museums in Russia, Italy, France, Great Britain and other countries.

== Personal life ==
Alexander Grigoriev met his future wife Evgenia Baklanova, a Muscovite, while working at the Zemstvo Union as a student at the Moscow School of Painting, Sculpture and Architecture.

During his eight years in Karaganda labor camp, his entire family was committed to defending his innocence. His wife wrote letters of petition to Lavrentiy Beria in the NKVD. In 1938, his eldest son Benjamin, who turned 19, wrote a letter to the leader Joseph Stalin" and talking about his father's glorious past for the good of the state, asking for help "to speed up a truthful analysis of his father's case".

Evgenia did not betray her husband, abandoning him, but believing in his innocence and trying to support him in correspondence; "After all, I know you everything and I believe, I believe firmly, I believe that I could not only do anything, but I could not think ... You, Shurka, take heart, take care of your health whenever possible. I am firmly convinced."

== Political views ==
According to the recollections of Sofia Krasilnikova, a Kozmodemyansk Komsomol member of the 1920s, the young man "received his first revolutionary baptism of fire in Kazan and experienced the cruelties of the provincial prison ...". For his participation in revolutionary demonstrations in 1909, Grigoriev was expelled from the teacher’s seminary and sent home under police supervision, and then reinstated.

Although Grigoriev said in 1940: "I was not a member of the Socialist-Revolutionary Party, and when I was a young man, I met, saw each other, spoke to them and used their underground literature, among which was Marxist literature". Yet since 1909, the artist was a member of the Esers.

Grigoriev met both revolutions of 1917— the February and October Revolutions in Moscow. A a rural man from the hinterland, he took the side of reforms, supporting the ideas of social democracy, Bolshevism and a change of government. Previously believing in the power of the revolution, Grigoriev then probably did not agree with the words of Nikolai Berdyaev about that time: "The Russian revolution was the end of the Russian intelligentsia ..."

After the October Coup, Grigoriev participated in the dispersal of the leadership of the Zemstvo Union headed by Prince Trubetskoy. In December 1917, Grigoriev became a member of the reformed Main Committee of the Zemstvo Union, in which he worked as a statistician until its liquidation in late 1918. Since December 1918, Grigoriev was a member of the RCP (b), becoming one of the first Soviet artists to be a communist, having already 20 years of party experience by 1938.

== Fame and reputation ==
Grigoriev played a major artistic and political role in the development of the Soviet art and raised the level of cultural education in the Mari Territory. K. Voroshilov, supported Grigoriev's idea to organize a trip to Ilya Repin. His aim was to tell the master about life in the young Soviet state and that the paintings of Repin and other Itinerants are not destroyed.

"He was a holy soul-man, as I", lya Repin wrote about Grigoriev, "believed in the bright future of the new country, which he was building together with his like-minded people".

Almost everything Grigoriev gave to the A.V. Grigoriev Art and History Museum was donated to them. In difficult times, when his fellow artists needed moral and material support, Grigoriev always tried to help them. Together with the poet P.A. Radimov, both former students of Nicolai Fechin, they helped Fechin obtain the necessary documents in Moscow to enable him to travel to the United States.

Artist Alexander V. Kuprin said to Grigoriev: "You are a rare phenomenon. You, the only artist, have a benevolent attitude towards older comrades, and you have helped many. I remember A. Arkhipov, Vasily Baksheev, K. Bogaevsky. Life is so difficult that when you mentally dwell on such a positive phenomenon as helping worthy old artists, it becomes easier on your soul, and the environment no longer seems bleak. In a word, your figure inspired cheerfulness."

Evgeny A. Katsman wrote: "Grigoriev is a fanatic of communism and realism. Party work and Akhrr are two terms, the sum is Grigoriev." In the words of D. Moschevitin, A. Grigoriev's fellow student in KHSH; "Passion-bearers, who in ancient times were canonized alive". The artist I. Mikhailovich Plandin in his letter to the widow A.V. Grigoriev added: "Our museum will serve as a monument to him for generations".

== Public collections ==
- A.V. Grigoriev Art and History Museum, Kozmodemyansk
- Tretyakov Gallery, Moscow
- Russian Museum, Saint-Petersburg

== Gallery ==
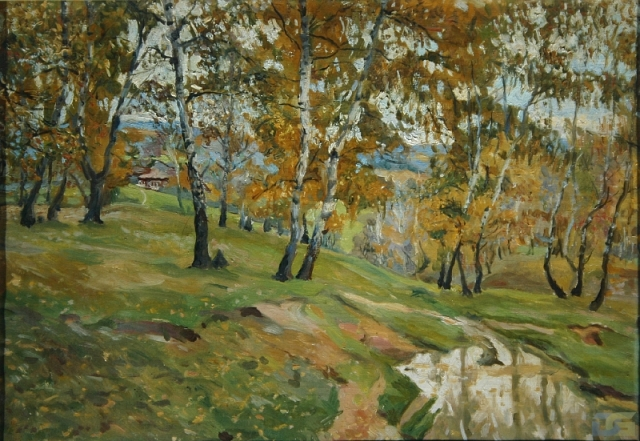
Birch Grove, 1959
