= Vyacheslav Savosin =

Vyacheslav Ivanovich Savosin (January 14, 1938, Moscow - October 2, 2014, Moscow) - famous Soviet and Russian artist, Honored Artist of the Russian Federation, master of painting and drawing, successfully and fruitfully worked in various genres, thematic blocks, stylistic directions of art. For more than a half-century career of V.Savosin he said his special word in graphics and painting, created his own individual figurative language, original and self-contained world of imagery.

V.Savosin was a participant in more than 150 exhibitions: group, personal, city, republican, all-union and foreign (Australia, Germany, France, Austria, Finland, Japan). You can meet Savosin’s artworks in the Tretyakov Gallery, the Pushkin Museum of Fine Arts, in other russian museums, as well as in museums and private collections in many countries: Germany, France, the United States, Cuba, the Netherlands, Switzerland, Austria, Finland, South Korea and others.

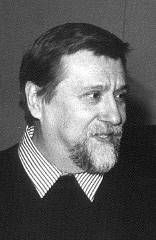

== Biography ==
Born January 14, 1938 in Moscow, lived on Tverskoy Boulevard.

Father - Ivan Sergeyevich Savosin (1902–1965), mother - Anna Fedorovna Igonina (1905–1982). Brother - Oleg Ivanovich Savosin. Wife - Natalia Alekseevna Savosina (Barikhina).

In 1960 he graduated from the graphic arts faculty of Moscow State Pedagogical Institute named after Lenin and joined Combine of graphic art of the Moscow Union of Artists. Since 1964 he is a member of the USSR Union of Artists.

Originative way of V.Savosin began in the 60s, the years of rapid flowering linocuts which he devoted a significant segment of his career. Easy solutions, monumentality, search modern graphic expression are the basic hallmarks of Savosin’s engravings. During this period he created a series of remarkable portraits: Hemingway, Blok, Mayakovsky, Bagritsky et al., mentioned not only in professional community but also the general public. For example, the portraits of Mayakovsky (1963) and Bagritsky (1963) were awarded the prize of Moscow Union of Artists as the best works of the year, and a portrait of Hemingway (1962) hung almost in every Soviet flat.

V.Savosin introduced into artistic practice three-or four-colored portrait in linocut. His portraits Aivazovsky, Gogol, Yesenin, Akhmatova, Surikov, Levitan, Dostoevsky, made in this technique, are widely known .

At the same time, dating back to the institute's years, Vyacheslav Savosin enthusiastically engaged in painting. But first exhibition of his paintings took place only in 1987 and, according to the well-known Moscow artist and writer Nikita Ivanov, "since this moment Savosin becomes a recognized master of painting with a very multi-faceted and brilliant "graphic past"

Chronologically and psychologically V.Savosin belonged to the community of "the Sixties," and not just "the sixties" but also to a generation whose half-starved post-war childhood took place in the corridors of the Moscow communal apartments, about which Vladimir Vysotsky sang, on Tverskoy boulevard and the Big Karetny lane. This unique atmosphere, awesome social circle (Levon Kocheryan, Vladimir Vysotsky, Vladimir Akimov, Michael Tumanishvili, Vsevolod Abdulov and other representatives of the creative elite of Moscow were friends of V.Savosin) left an indelible imprint in the Savosin’s works. His Moscow, Moscow paysages are so shrill and childish touching that if you see them - you fall in love with this city, its “gone with the wind” charm and tune" ... In the canvases was Moscow: Sometimes smiling with childish balls, sometimes rainy. But not gloomy, it is cleaned, reflected in its wet pavement, with a slight ironic touch - a beer tank, surrounded by an indispensable stage. " (V.Akimov. From the book "Vyacheslav Savosin. Paintings, drawings").

V.Savosin is an author of the poetry collection "Poetic reflection of the artist" - M., 2003

Died on October 2, 2014. Buried at the Vostryakovskoe cemetery in Moscow.
