= Vsehudozhnik =

Russian art and crafts union

Vsekokhudozhnik
- Всекохудожник
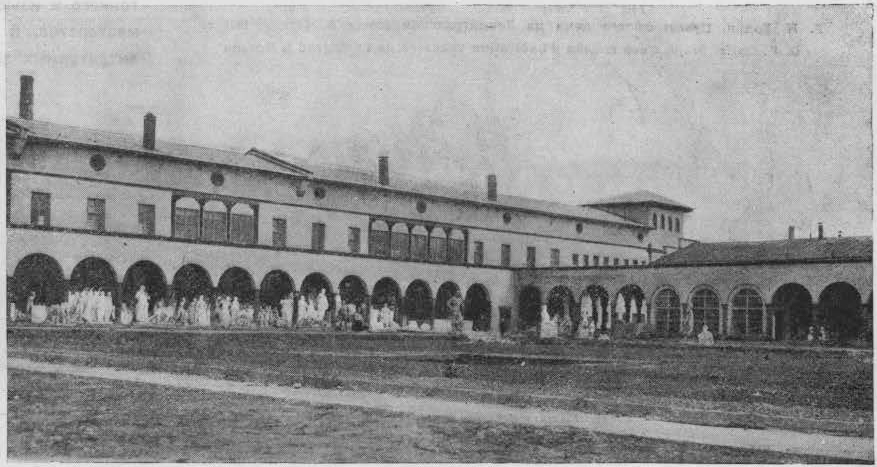
- Vsekokhudozhnik
- Successor: Khudozhestvenny fond of the USSR
- Founded: September 1928
- Dissolved: July 1953
- Type: Cooperative union (All-Russian Cooperative Union of Fine Arts Workers)
- Purpose: Fine Arts, Sculpture, Crafts, Publishing, Exhibitions
- Location: Moscow, RSFSR, Soviet Union
- Region served: Soviet Union
- Products: Art objects, ceramics (Gzhel), Palekh miniatures, textile dolls
- Official language: Russian

Vsekokhudozhnik (Russian: Всекоху́дожник; an acronym for Vserossiyskoye kooperativnoye obyedineniye "Khudozhnik," meaning All-Russian Cooperative Association "Artist" or All-Russian Cooperative Union of Fine Arts Workers) was an All-Russian union of cooperative partnerships for fine arts workers. It existed from 1928 to 1953 and united artels of artists, sculptors, and craft masters across the RSFSR and the USSR.

== History ==
The organization was initially formed as the Industrial Credit Partnership "Artist" in September 1928. The Partnership was reorganized on July 2, 1932, into the All-Russian Cooperative Union of Fine Arts Workers ("Vsekokhudozhnik"). It was initially under the jurisdiction of the All-Russian Council of Industrial Cooperatives (Vsekopromsovet). In March 1935, Vsekokhudozhnik was transferred to the system of the Narkompros of the RSFSR. From 1940, it was managed by the system of the Council of People's Commissars of the RSFSR (SNK of the RSFSR), and subsequently the Council of Ministers of the RSFSR. Vsekokhudozhnik was liquidated in July 1953, with its functions being transferred to the Khudozhestvenny fond of the USSR.

== Activities ==
In the 1920s and 1930s, the artel produced textile dolls in folk costumes, ranging in height from 8 to 40 cm. These included "Akulina," "Village Boy," "Voronezh Woman," and "Smolyanka." These products were sold through Torgsin stores and were not widely accessible to the general audience in the USSR. However, such souvenirs were popular among collectors in the United States, where catalogs with descriptions, names, and auction prices of the dolls were published in the 1930s and 1940s.

In 1935, a Copyright Protection Bureau was established under the Vsekokhudozhnik board.

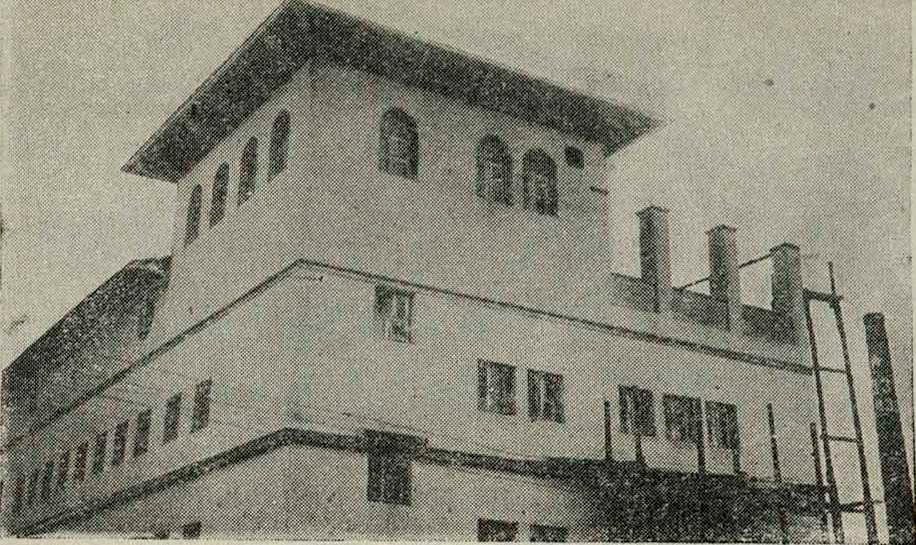
Isofabrika Vsehudozhnuk.

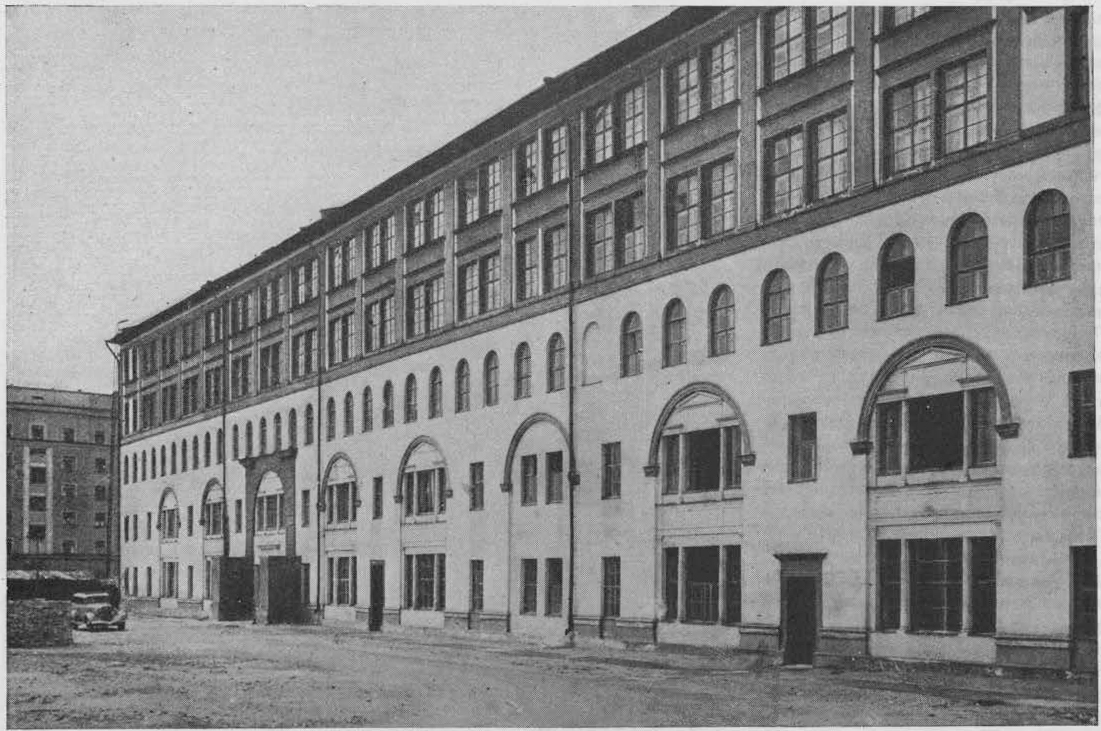
Vsehudozhnik Workshops in Moscow

The association's exhibition space hosted art exhibitions, including solo shows for G. Motovilov (1934) and A. Deineka (1935–1936), as well as the group exhibition "Sculpture in Wood" (from June 1935), which featured 10 artists.

From 1936 for two years, a team of model makers, led by V. Batyushkov, carried out all prop and model work for the panorama and diorama exhibition "The Storming of Perekop." The artel's artists were also involved in decorating the All-Union Agricultural Exhibition (VSKhV).

In the 1930s, at the artel's facility in Gzhel, a style was developed that later became characteristic of Gzhel ceramics. Alexander Saltykov brought forms by M. Vrubel from the Abramtsevo workshop, and masters produced items like "Tsar Berendey" and "The Abduction of Europe." They recreated famous majolica and semi-faience, fulfilled orders for decorating the pavilions of the All-Union Agricultural Exhibition (VSKhV), and from 1936, for the Moscow Metro. By the 1940s, Vsekokhudozhnik was considered the largest enterprise in Gzhel. During the war years, the association became one of the main clients for Palekh miniature art. Palekh artists created works for All-Union exhibitions commissioned by Vsekokhudozhnik. In the post-war period, the artel's funds preserved paintings, including those that had not received critical acclaim, while also organizing exhibitions of new and established artists.

== Namesakes ==
Since 2019, the name "Vsekokhudozhnik" has been adopted by the organizers of a private Moscow gallery.

== Staff ==
V. N. Batyushkov (from 1933) V. K. Karpov (from 1945)
