= Olga Zhekulina =

Russian artist (1900–1973)

Olga Zhekulina О́льга Жеку́лина
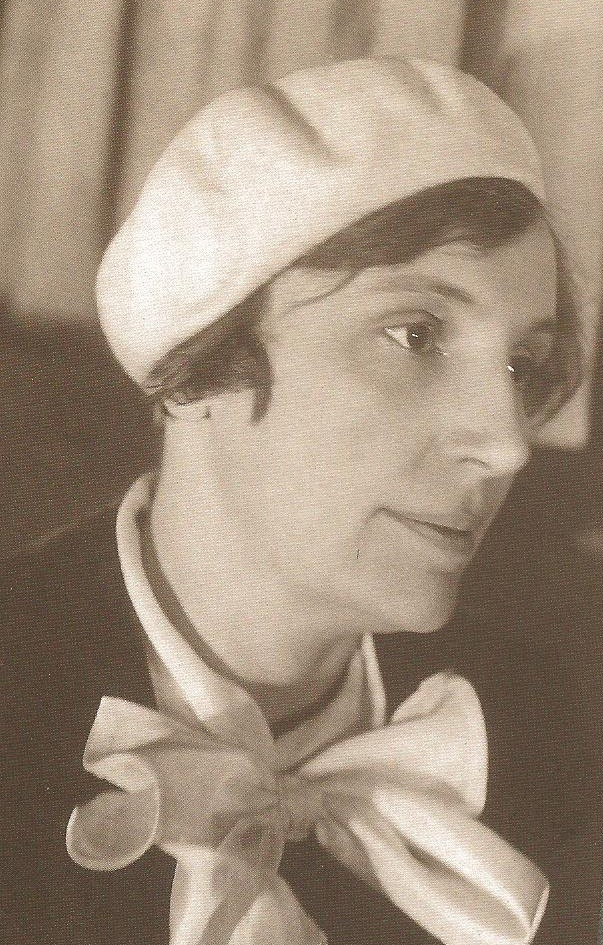
- Born: 4 October 1900; Kherson, Russian Empire
- Died: 5 August 1973 (aged 72)
- Known for: Painter, puppeteer
- Patron(s): Konstantin Yuon, Konstantin Korovin

Olga Anatolyevna Zhekulina (Russian: О́льга Анато́льевна Жеку́лина; 4 October 1900 — 5 August 1973) was a noted Russian painter and one of the famous Soviet puppeteers.

She was a member of the Moscow Union of Artists.

== Biography ==
Olga Zhekulina was born in 1900 in a noble family. Originally she received art education in the private studio of the famous Russian artist Konstantin Yuon, where she studied until 1917.

In 1918–1921, she studied at the Free Art Studios of Konstantin Korovin (since 1921 - Vkhutemas). In 1921, she was expelled from Zhekulina Art Workshops for her non-proletarian origin.

Serious creative activity of the artist began at the turn of the 1910s and 20s.

In the 20s Zhekulina participated in the life of the "Fire-color" Association, which also consisted of Arkhipov, Bogorodskiy, Dobuzhinsky, Petrov-Vodkin, Voloshin, and other major artists of the time. The main motives of the artist in painting during this period were - "hut buried in the snow, spring, silver gave summer".

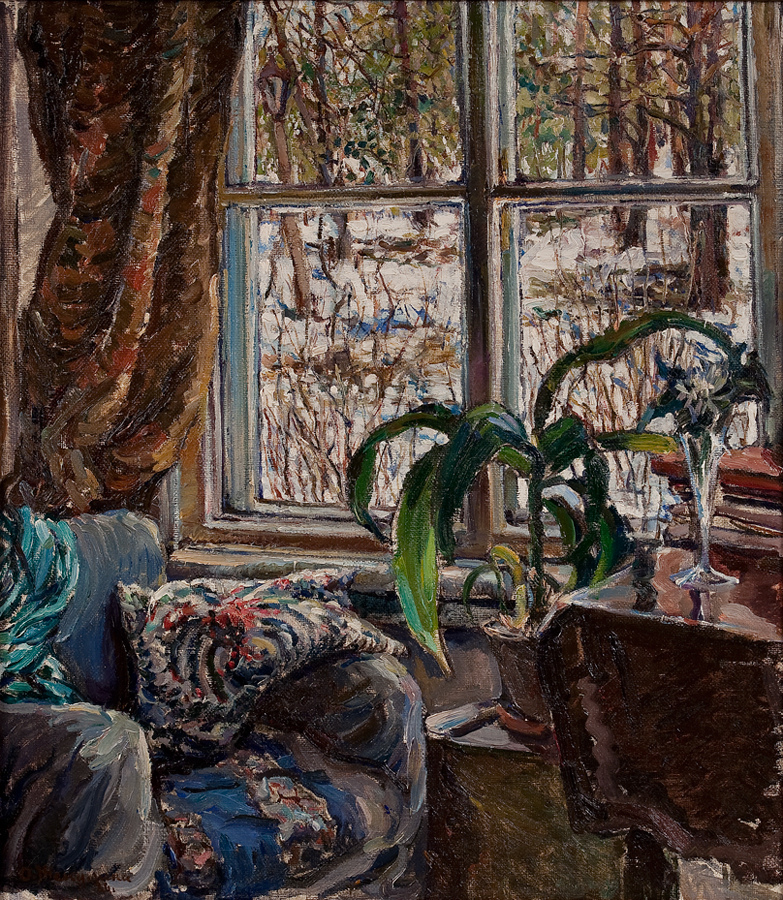
Window. 1926

In 1930, she became known for the scenery of "A trivial comedy for serious people" by Oscar Wilde for a branch of the Maly Theater.

After that, she worked for nearly twenty years as the puppet theater artist of the Moscow House of Pioneers.

In the 1950s, She became a member of the Moscow Union of Artists. In the late 1950s Zhekulina working on a major state order: a series of landscapes of the Red Presnya.

In the 1960s, the artist was working on a "Valdai cycle", dedicated to the Russian village.

The artist died in 1973. During her life, the artist created some 200 works.

== Family ==
Her father was a district agronomist, and then a banker. He was repressed.

The older brother Sergey was a professor of psychology. The younger brother Leo was a famous scientist and engineer, author of hundreds of scientific papers. Leo worked with Sergei Korolev.

== Works ==
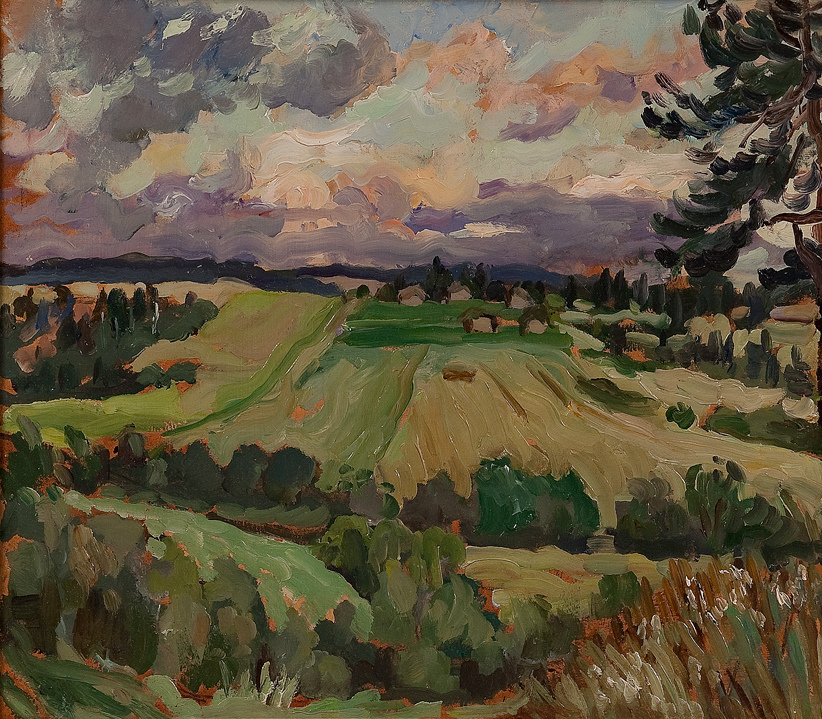

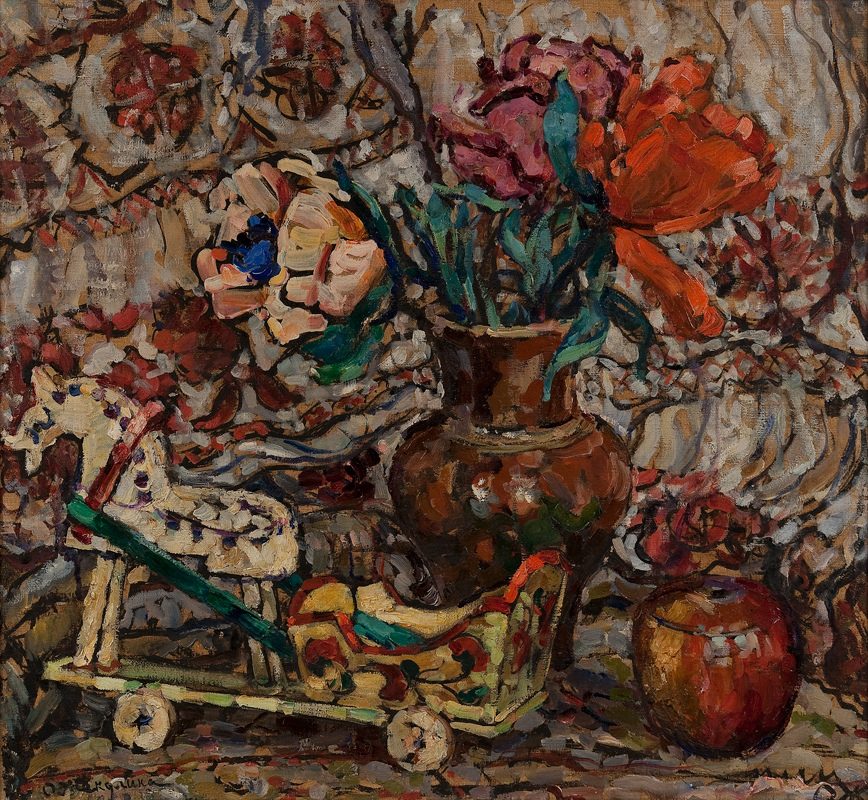

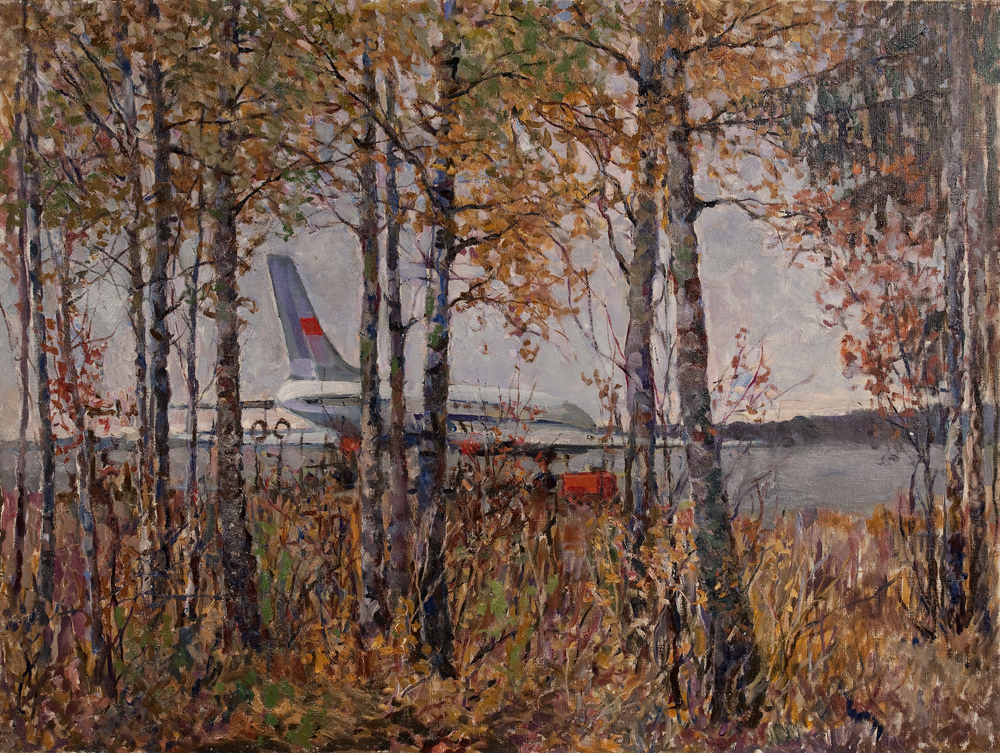
