= Konstantin Yuon =

Russian painter (1875–1958)

- 1955
- Born: 24 October [O.S. 12 October] 1875; Moscow, Russia
- Died: April 11, 1958 (aged 82); Moscow, Russian SFSR, Soviet Union
- Education: Moscow School of Painting, Sculpture and Architecture
- Known for: Painting
- Movement: Impressionism, Symbolism, Socialist realism
- Spouse: Klavdiya Alekseyevna Yuon (Nikitina) (1883-1965)

Konstantin Fyodorovich Yuon or Juon (Russian: Константи́н Фёдорович Юо́н; 24 October [O.S. 12 October] 1875 – April 11, 1958) was a Russian painter and theatre designer associated with Mir Iskusstva. Later, he co-founded the Union of Russian Artists and the Association of Artists of Revolutionary Russia.

== Biography ==
Yuon was born in Moscow to the family of a banking clerk of Swiss-Russian origin (the surname Juon being of Walser origin). His brother Paul Juon was a notable composer.

From 1892 to 1898 he studied at the Moscow School of Painting, Sculpture and Architecture where Konstantin Savitsky and Konstantin Korovin were among his distinguished teachers. After graduating from the Moscow Art School he took private lessons from Valentin Serov (1898–1900). During several trips to Western Europe, particularly in Paris, he became acquainted with the cityscapes of Camille Pissarro and other Impressionists, but retained his own distinctive style.

In 1900 he opened the first private painting and drawing school in Moscow. Some noted Russian painters received art education in the school (for example, Olga Zhekulina). Later he taught in Leningrad Academy of Arts and the Surikov Art Institute in Moscow. His studio in Moscow was widely used by other painters. He designed sets for plays at the Moscow Art Theatre and the Maly Theater, becoming the official designer for this theater from 1945 to 1947. He also contributed sets for operas.

In the Soviet era, Yuon was the director of the Research Institute of the Academy of Arts (1948–1950) and the First Secretary of the Union of Soviet Artists (1956–1958). He won a Stalin Prize (1943), received the Order of Lenin and other orders and medals. He died in Moscow on April 11, 1958.

== Selected works ==
Konstantin Yuon started as an Impressionist landscape and genre painter with a Symbolist note. Among the impressionist landscapes are To the Trinity (1903) and Tverskoy Boulevard (1909). Later he toyed with the ideas of lyrical landscape mixed with the imitations of Palekh miniature and Icon arts. The most Symbolist of his works are the cycle of engravings Creation of the World on the theme of Genesis (1908–1912) and the painting New Planet that shows the October Revolution as the result of a cosmic catastrophe. To the end of his life he became a strict socialist realism artist, producing paintings like Parade on the Red Square on November 7, 1941.

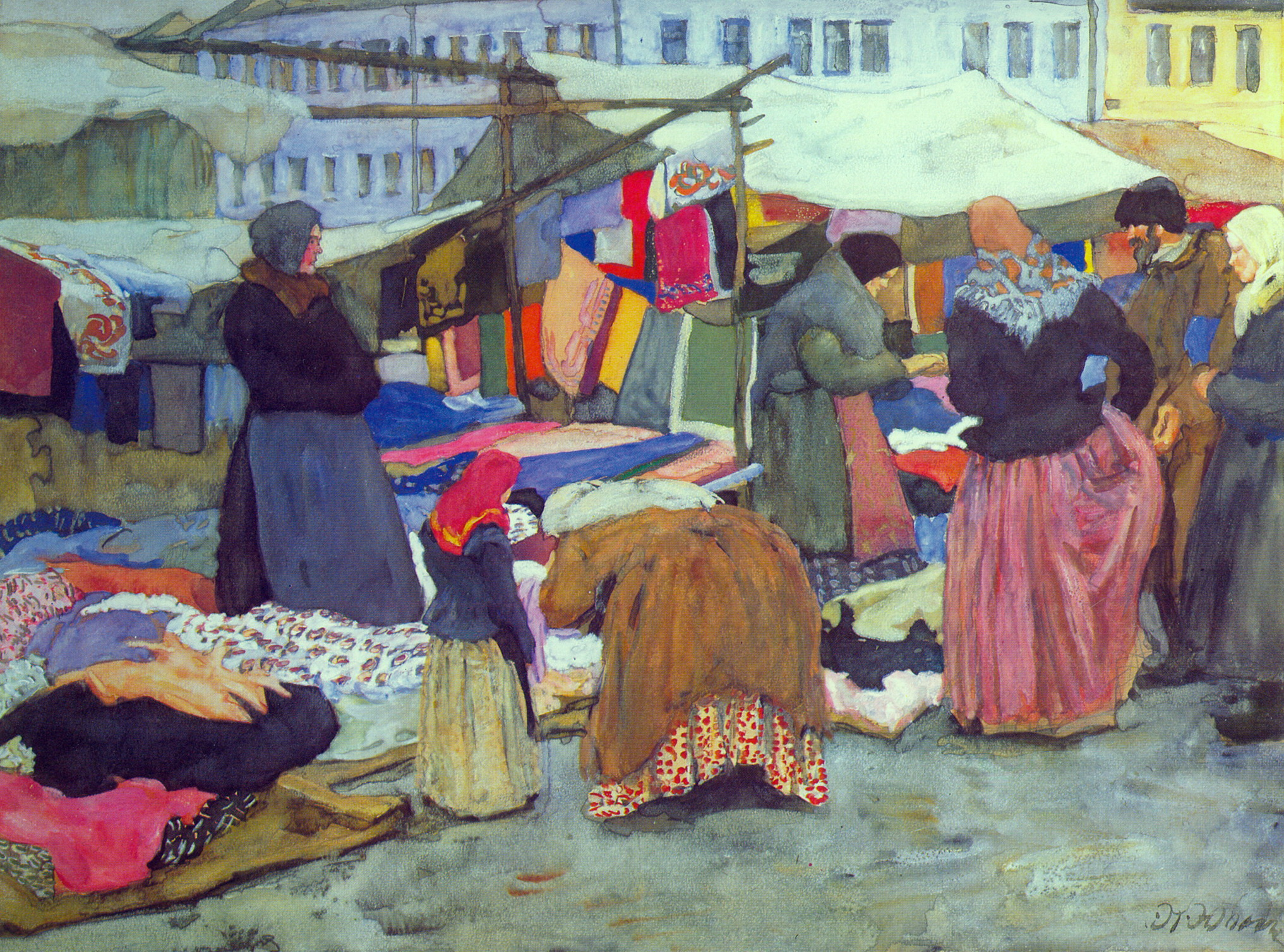
Soft goods, 1905

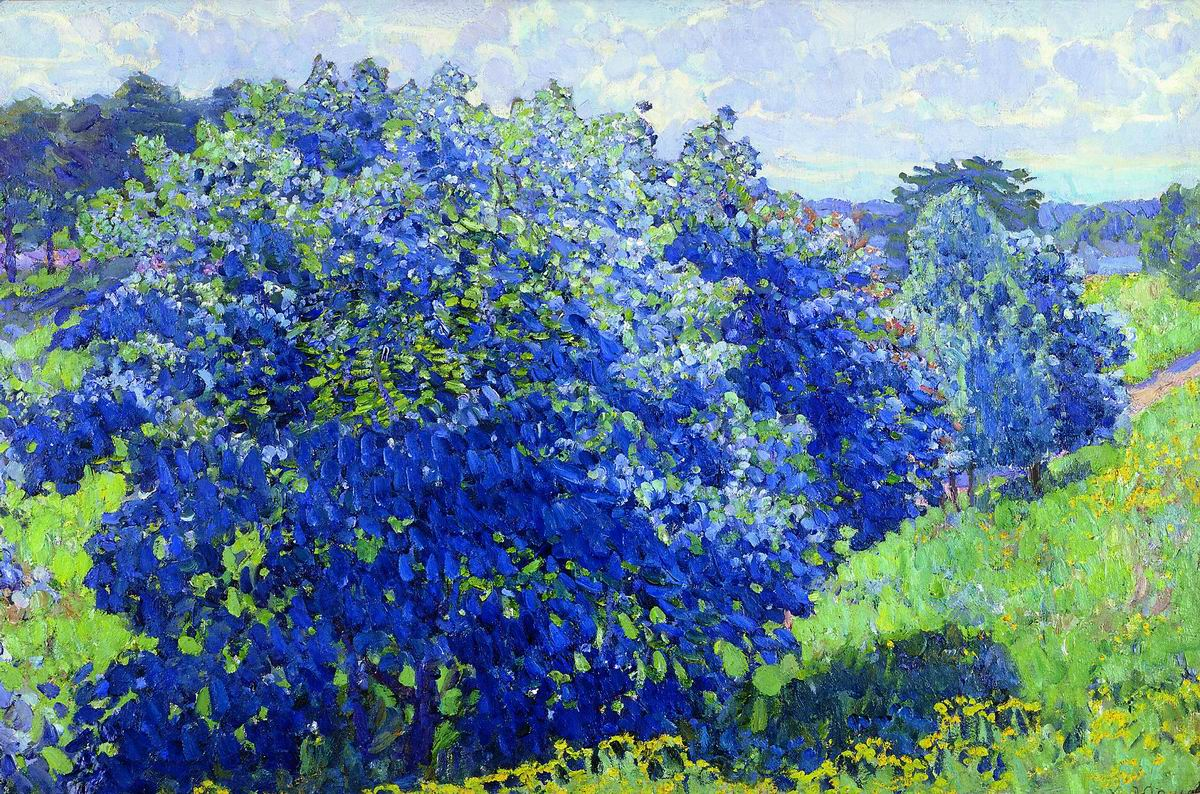
The blue bush, 1908

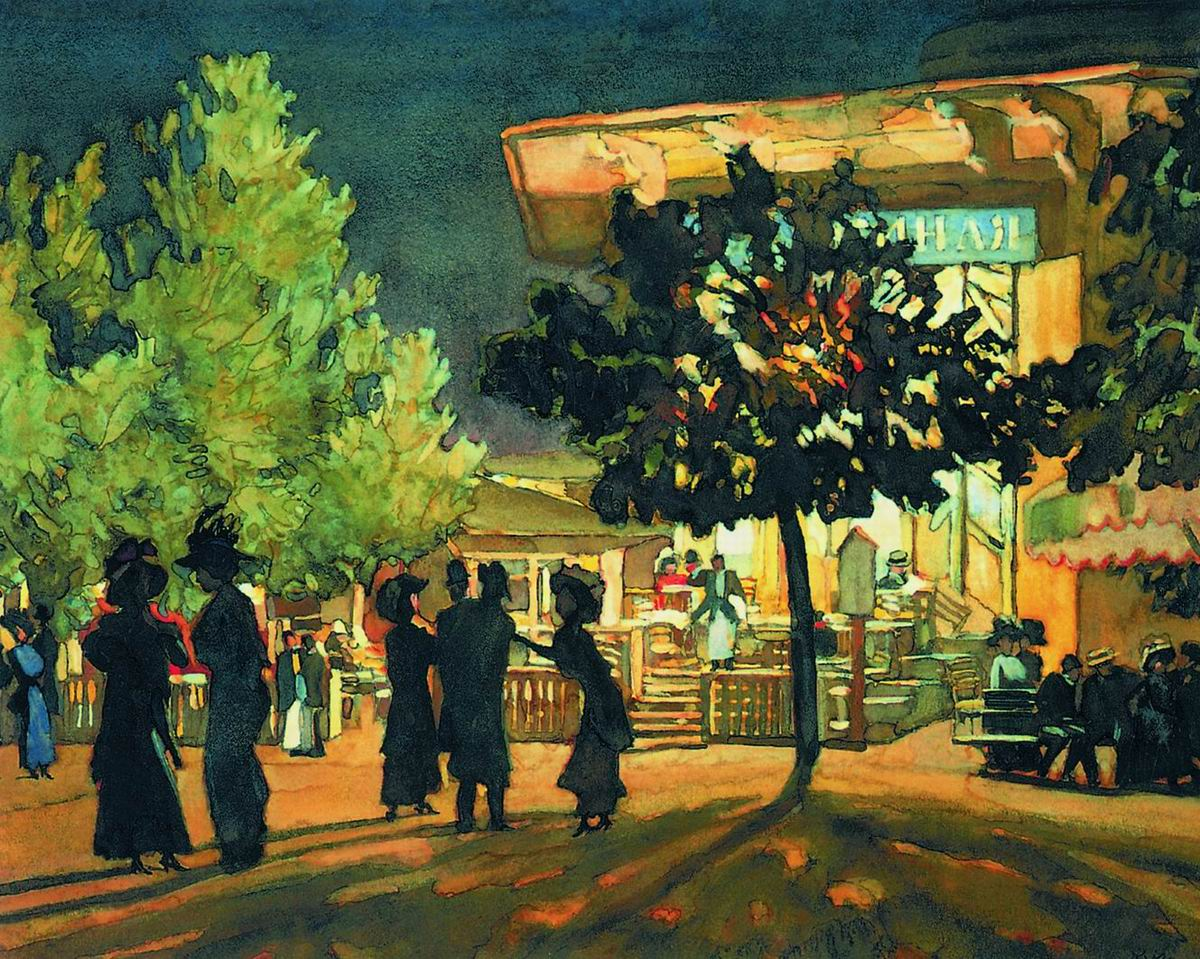
Tverskoy Boulevard, 1909

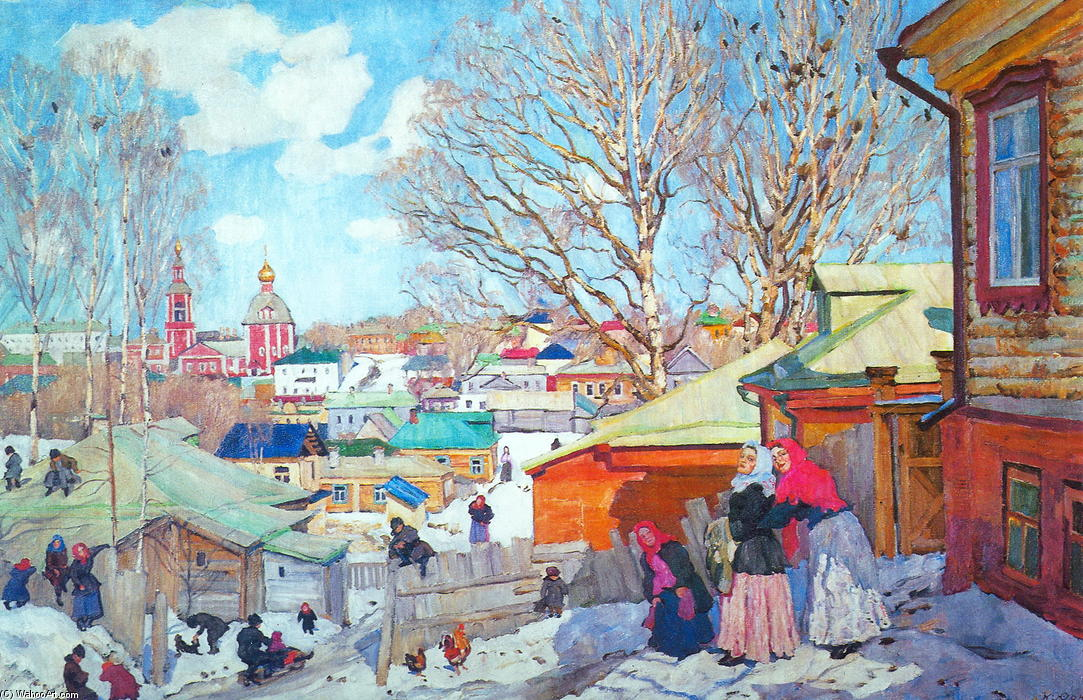
Spring sunny day, 1910

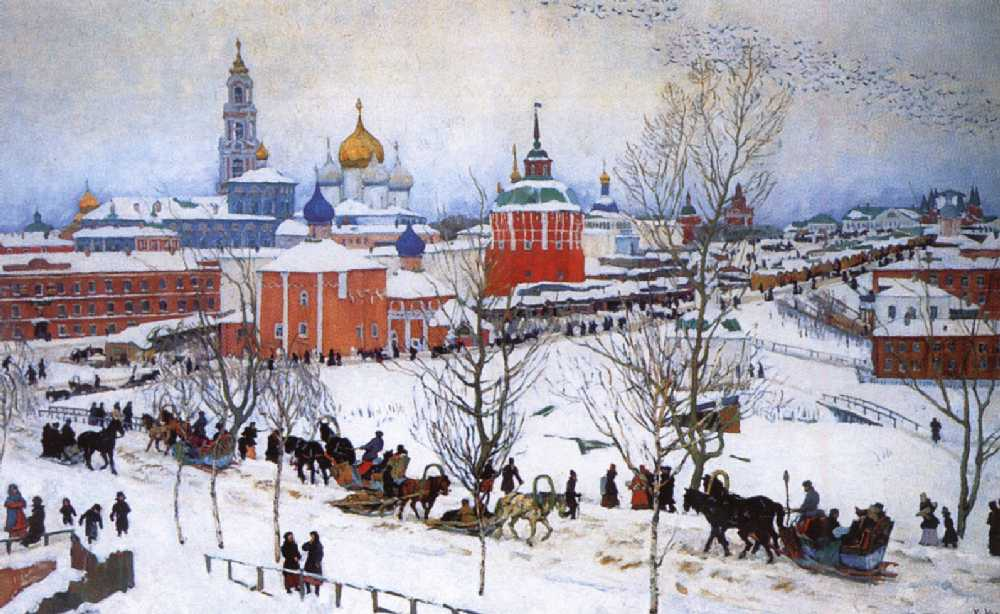
View of the Troitse-Sergiyeva Lavra from Vokzalnaya Street, 1911

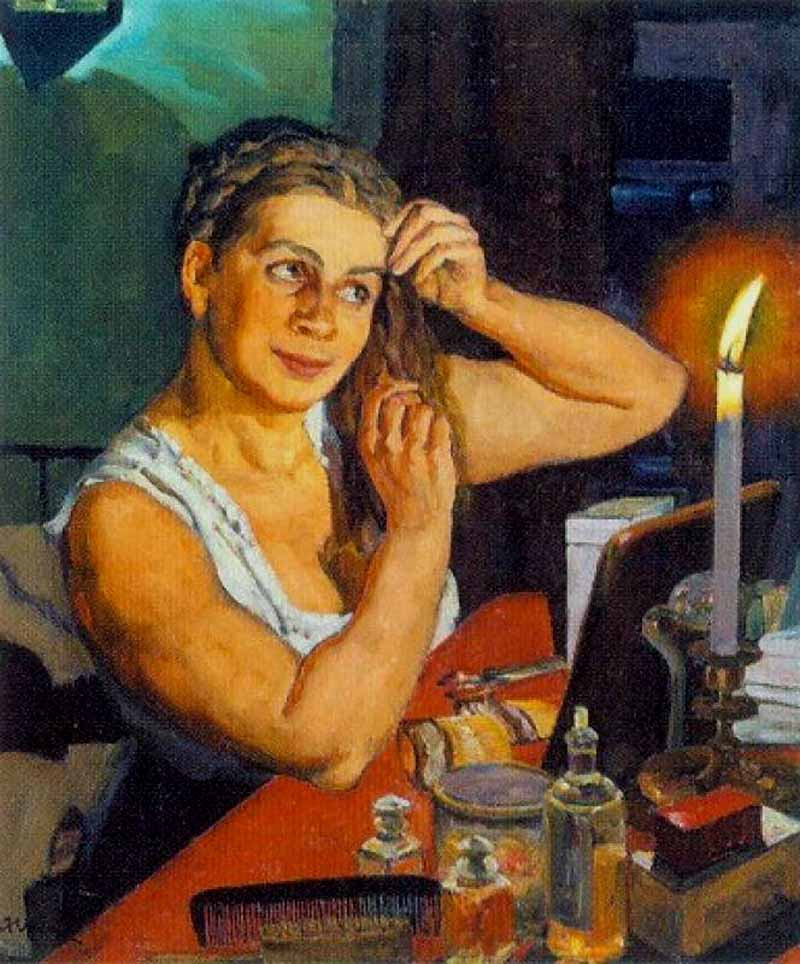
Portrait of Klavdiya Yuon, the artist's wife, 1911

New Planet, 1921

Parade on the Red Square on November 7, 1941, painted in 1949

== See also ==
- List of Russian artists
