= A.V. Grigoriev Art and History Museum =

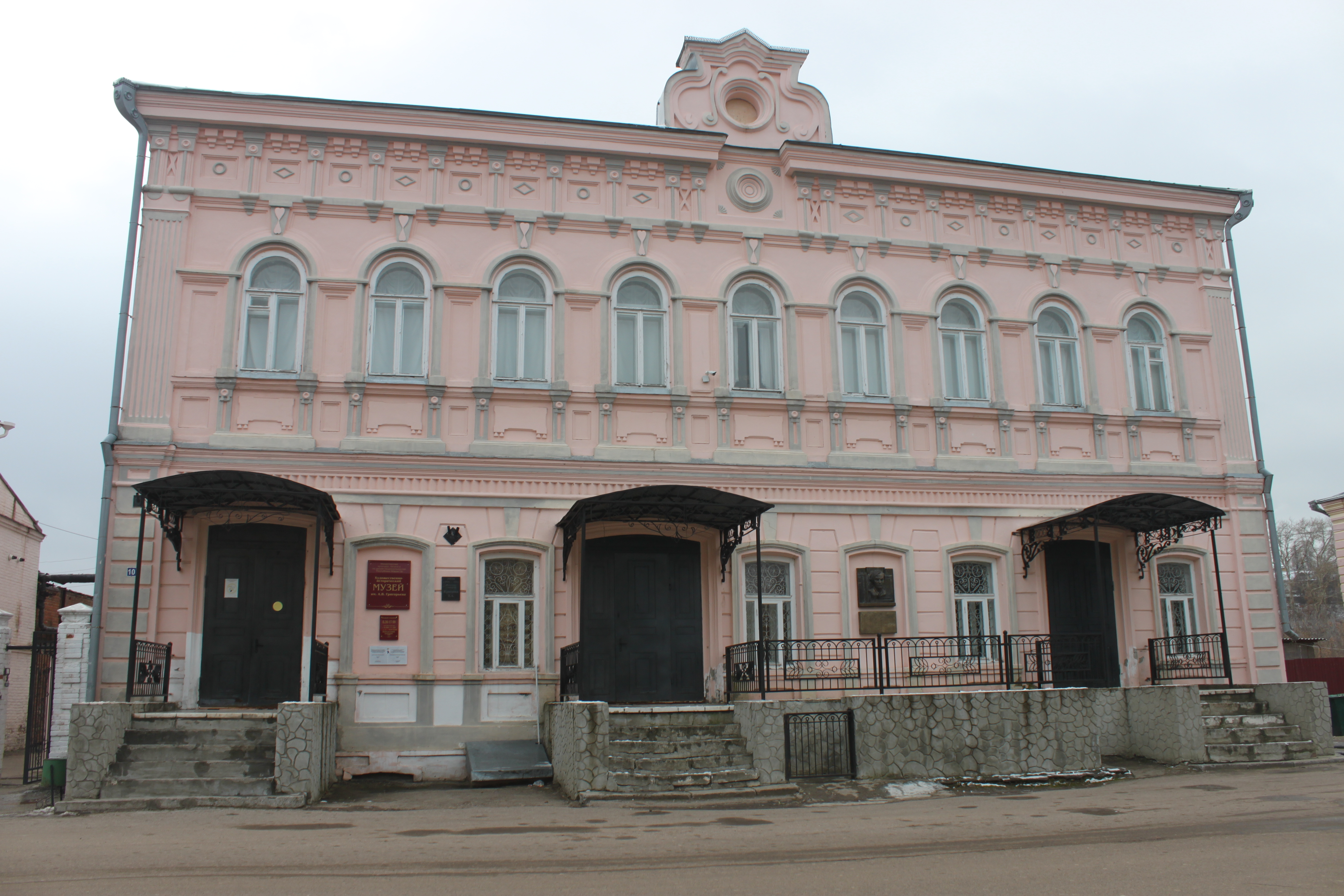
- Established: 1919; 107 years ago
- Location: Kozmodemyansk, Mari El Republic, Russia
- Coordinates: 56°20′30.84″N 46°33′48.708″E
- Type: Art museum
- Founder: Alexander Grigoriev

The A.V. Grigoriev Art and History Museum (Russian: Художественно-исторический музей им. А. В. Григорьева) is one of the oldest art galleries in the Volga region, founded in 1919 by Alexander Grigoriev in Kozmodemyansk, Mari El Republic. Branch of the municipal institution " Kozmodemyansky cultural and historical museum complex ".

In 2020, the museum was ranked among the 10 best regional museums of Russian Art.

== History ==
In 1918, the artists of Kazan organized the Volga-Kama free mobile exhibition, which was planned to be shown in the cities of the Volga and Kama regions. Among 40 paintings there were works by Russian Itinerants and contemporary Kazan artists (P. Radimov, G. Medvedev, N. Feshin). Researchers believe that the exhibition was based on paintings from the collection of Alexander Mantel. When the paintings arrived in Kozmodemyansk, a civil war broke out in the country. The White Guards entered Kazan. The paintings remained for preservation in the department of public education of Kozmodemyansk.

In the fall of 1919, one of the first professional Mari artists, Alexander Vladimirovich Grigoriev, arrived in Kozmodemyansk . Seeing the paintings of the Volga-Kama exhibition, A. Grigoriev decided to organize a museum in the city. Pictures of Kazan artists and famous Russian painters formed the basis of the art department of the museum.

The museum was established on September 7, 1919. Initially, the museum was located in the house of the merchant Torsuev, since 1933 - in the building of the Smolensk Cathedral. Since 1998, the museum has been located in the house of the merchant Ponomarev, which is an architectural monument of the 19th century, specially restored for its placement. This house was built in 1883 and is considered the most beautiful house in the city for its architecture and layout.

November 4, 1920 “in honor of the third anniversary of the October Revolution and in view of the merits in the field of public education and as the founder of the museum, the executive committee of the Kozmodemyansk district council decided to call the Kozmodemyansk museum named after comrade Grigorieva A. V.".

In the 1920s, Grigoriev left for Moscow. While in the capital, A. Grigoriev managed to acquire 50 paintings by famous artists, sculpture and porcelain. In addition, many works donated to him by various artists at that time also entered the museum (works by V. Byalynitsky-Biruli, P. Radimov, F. Malyavin)".

In 1938 A.V. Grigoriev became a victim of Stalinist repressions and spent 8 years in Kazakhstan. The name of Grigoriev was taken away from the Kozmodemyansk Museum. In 1946 he was released, but only in 1954 the artist achieved rehabilitation. In 1966, the name of A. V. Grigoriev was returned to the museum in Kozmodemyansk ".

The directors S. Bochkarev, S. Puzyrnikov, I. Plandin, A. Mikheeva made a great contribution to the development and formation of the museum funds in 1919-1963".

The museum has more than 43 thousand storage units, of which 3.5 thousand are objects of fine art. The beginning of the picture gallery was the Volga-Kama traveling exhibition, organized in 1918 by Kazan artists. Later, the collection was replenished thanks to the personal acquaintance of AV Grigoriev with famous artists and collectors, and in the 1970s-1980s - due to the paintings of Leningrad artists.

The core of the art collection consists of works by Russian artists of the 19th and 20th centuries. The painting of the first half of the 19th century is represented by female portraits of unknown Russian and European artists. The academic style is represented in the museum mainly by the portrait genre ("An Italian at the Source" by Karl Bryullov [to clarify], the academic work "Saint Jerome" by the graduate of the Academy of Arts G. Belov).

The art of the Itinerants of the second half of the 19th century is also represented in the collection. These are the works of such famous masters as: "Poor Boy with a Basket" by I. I. Tvorozhnikov, "Sunrise in the Mountain" by S. I. Svyatoslavsky, "Pond" by L. L. Kamenev, "Sunrise", "Herd by the Stream " A. A. Kiselev, " Portrait of a Boy "by N. E. Rachkov," Peasant Children "by A. I. Korzukhin and other artists working in the genre of portrait and landscape.

The maritime theme in the museum is reflected in such works as "Moonlit Night on the Black Sea" by the Russian marine painter I. Aivazovsky, "Flat Calm", "Seashore" by RG Sudkovsky, "Sea Bay" by EE Shroder.

The museum is especially proud of the works of the world-famous artist Nikolai Feshin . In 1923, when Feshin left for the US, A.V. Grigoriev was able to buy several works from him. In addition, Feshin presented him with sketches of the " Cheremis wedding ". Thus, the collection contains eleven works by one of the most famous painting improvisers".

The historical department of the museum consists of 3 thematic rooms; the first one presents expositions on the nature of the region, archeology and ethnography; in the second - a collection of oriental, European and Russian porcelain of the 18th-20th centuries; in the third, expositions are devoted to the past and present of Kozmodemyansk.

== Gallery ==
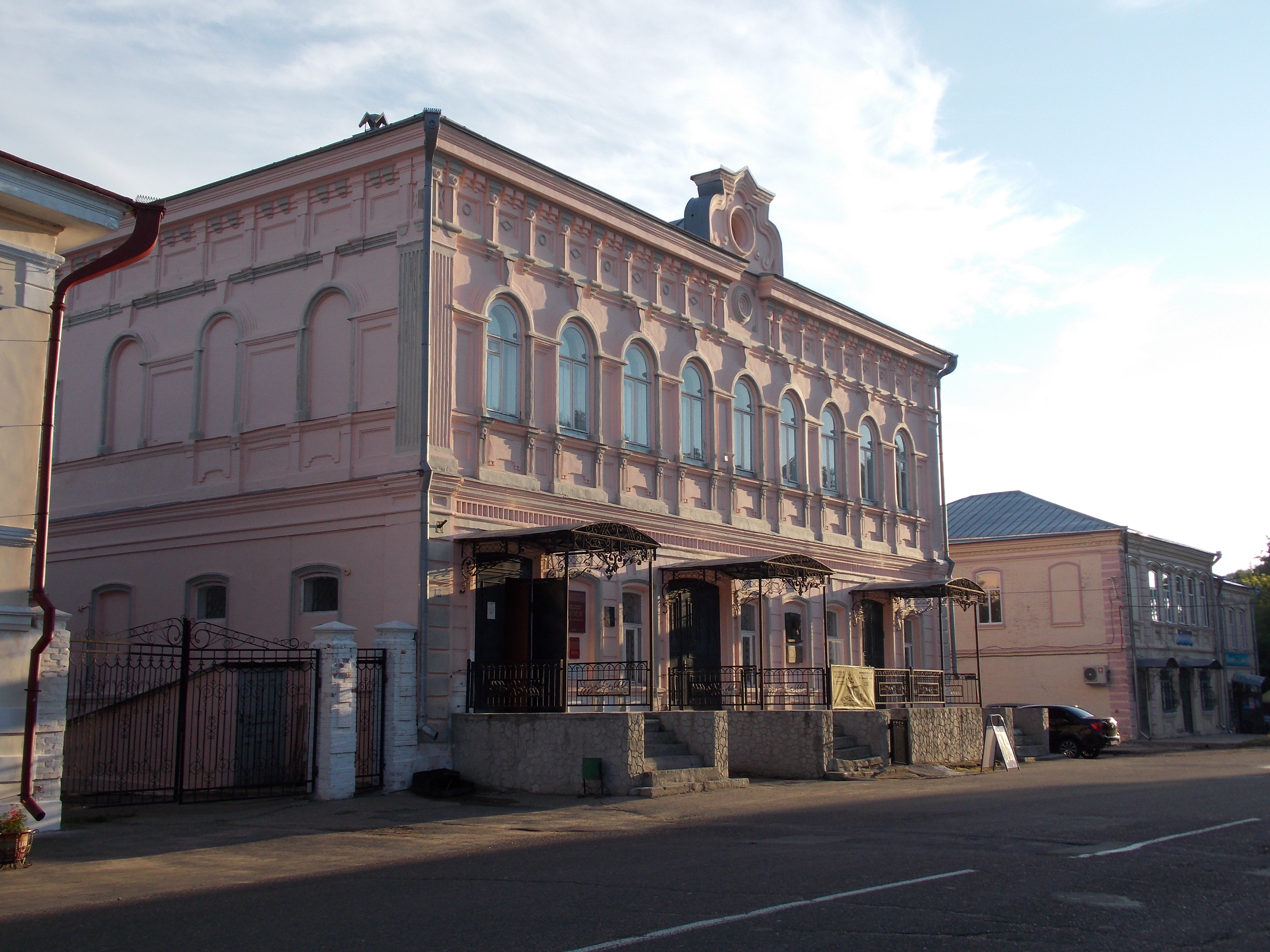

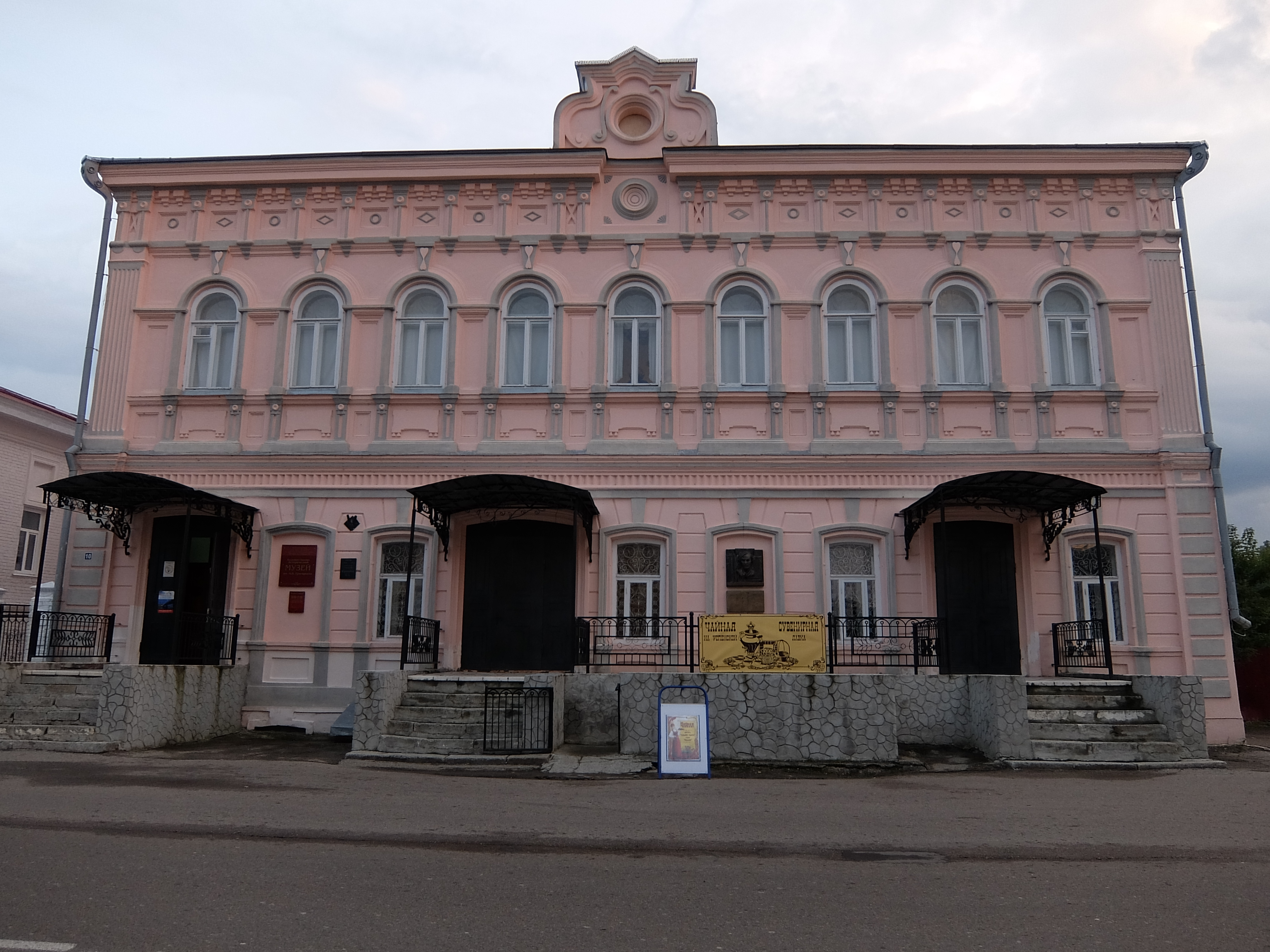

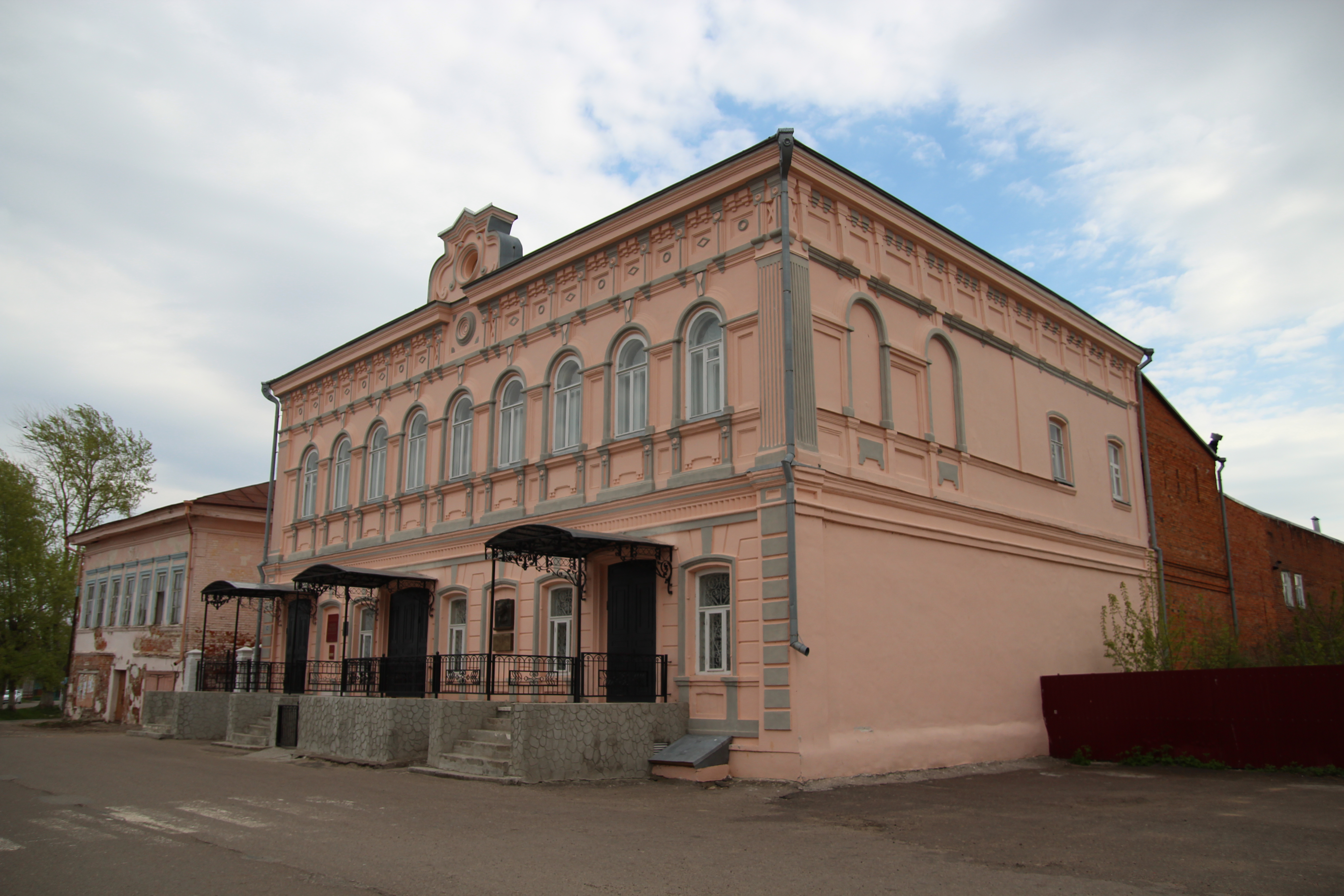

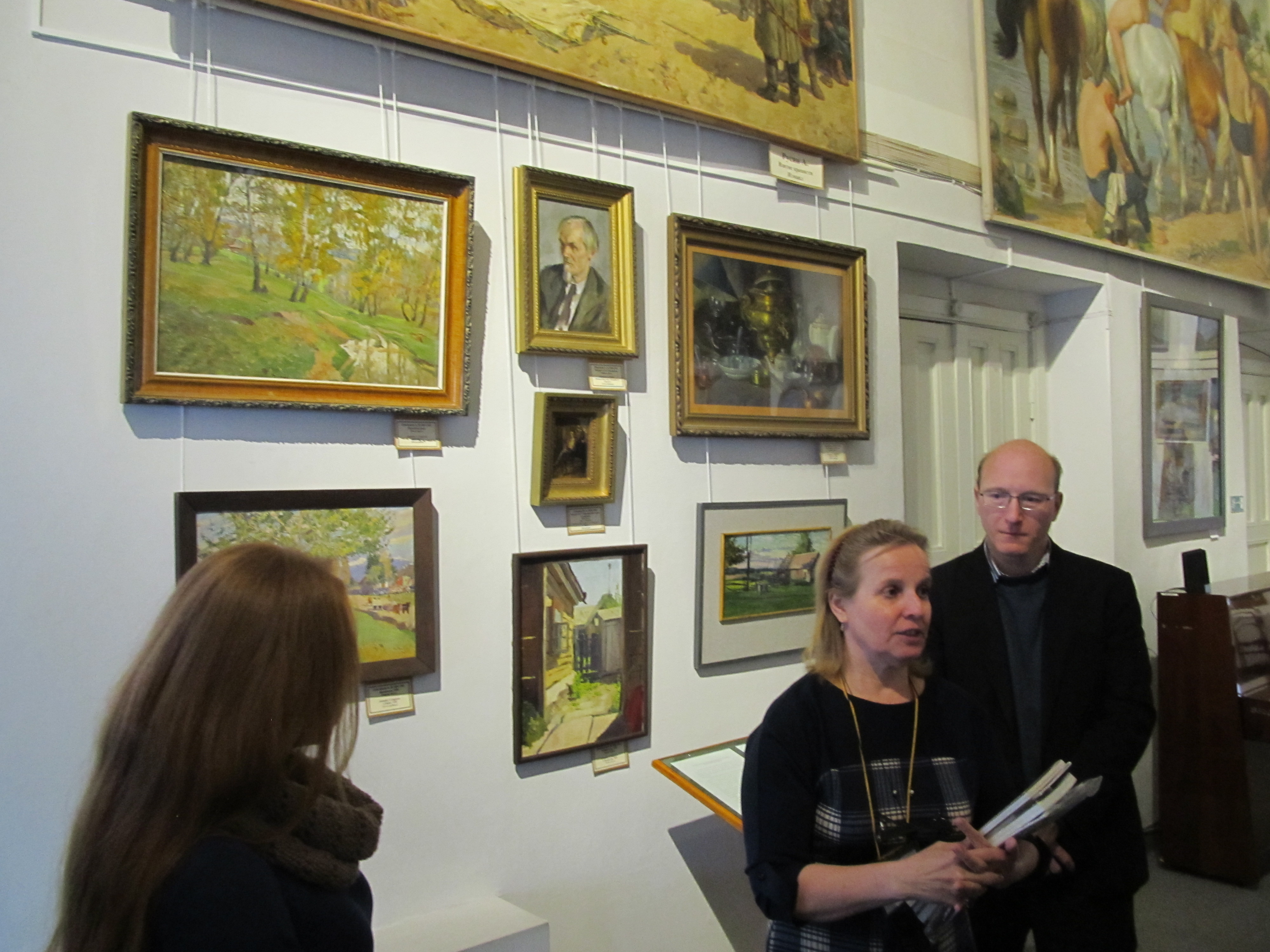

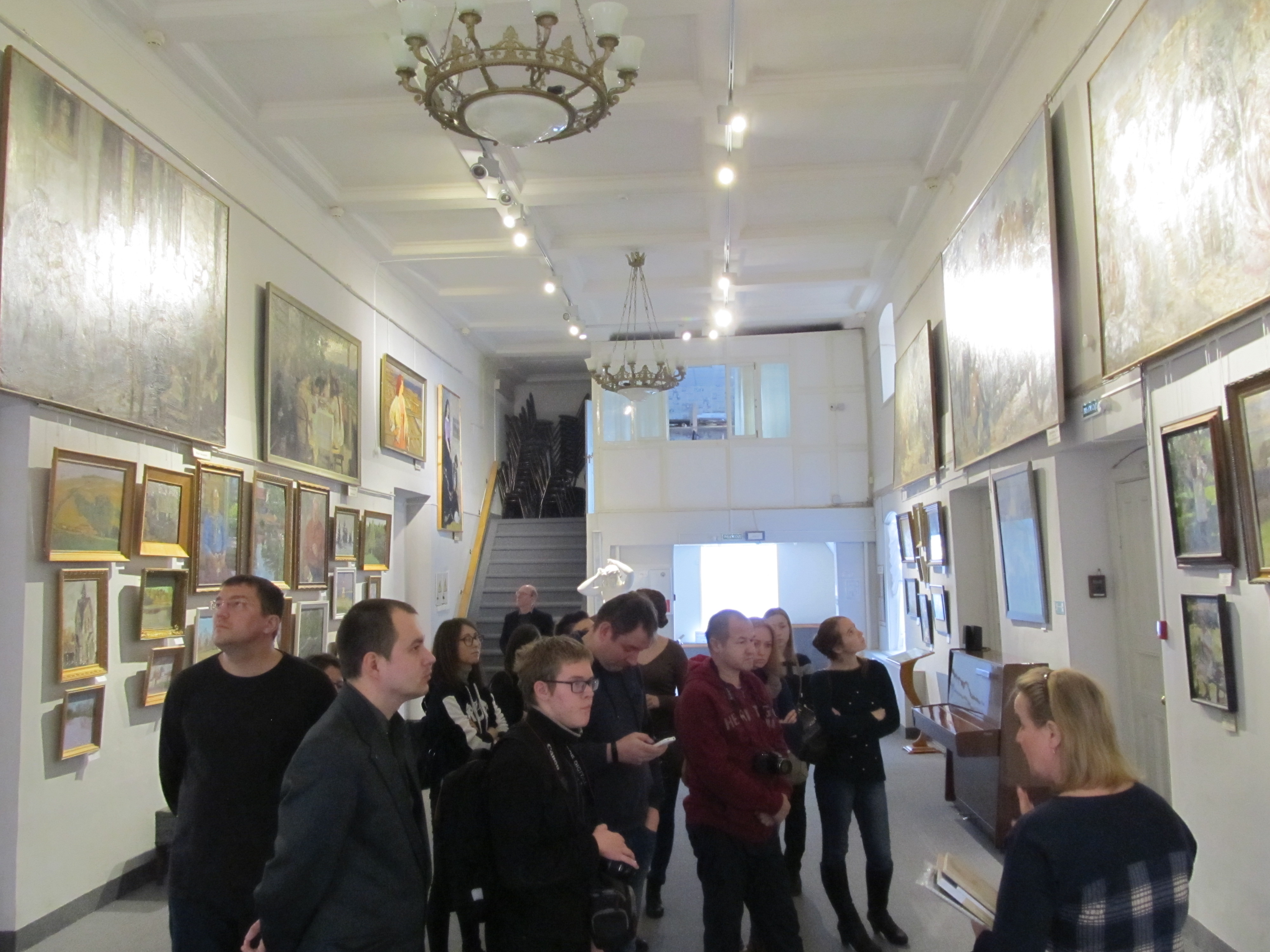

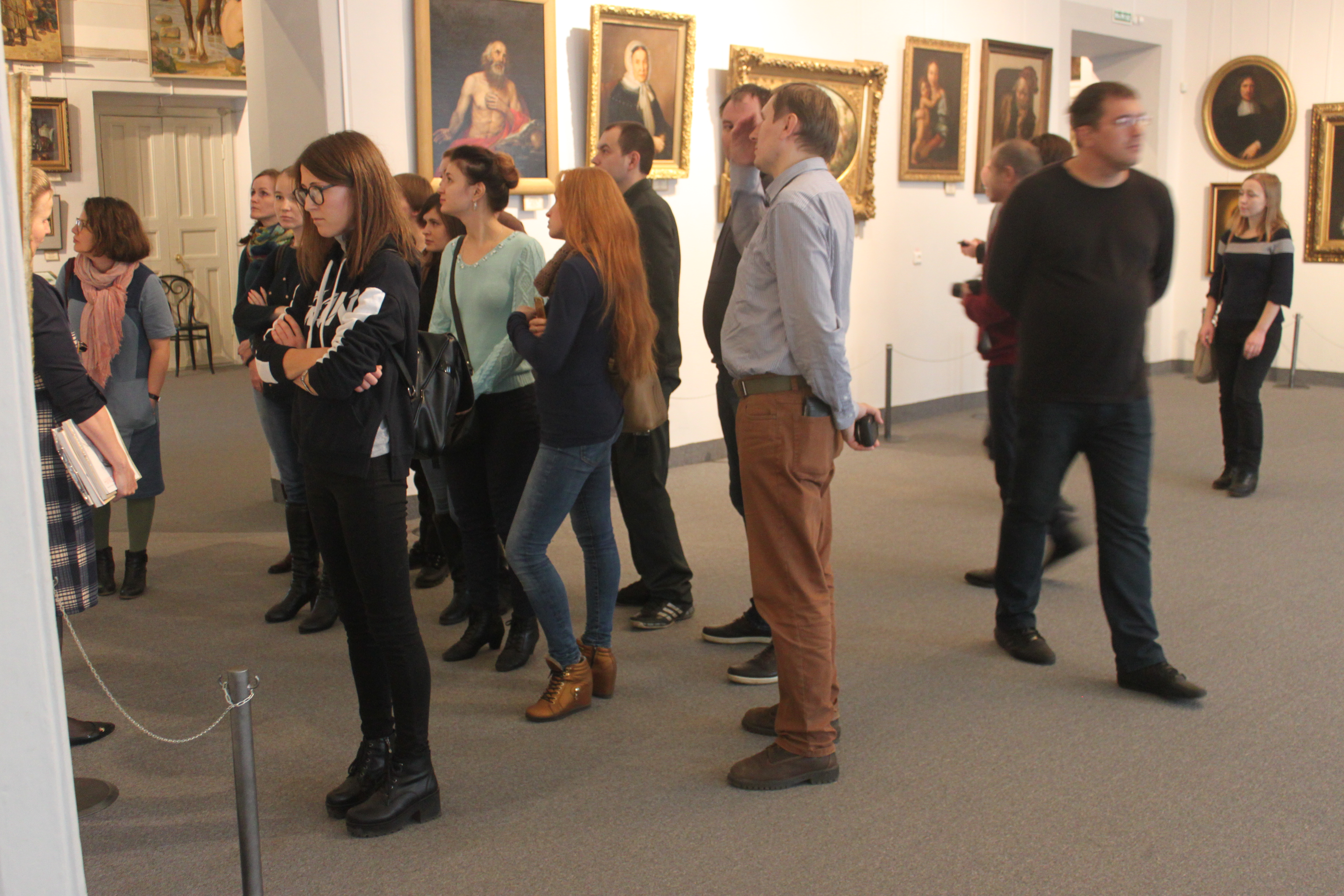

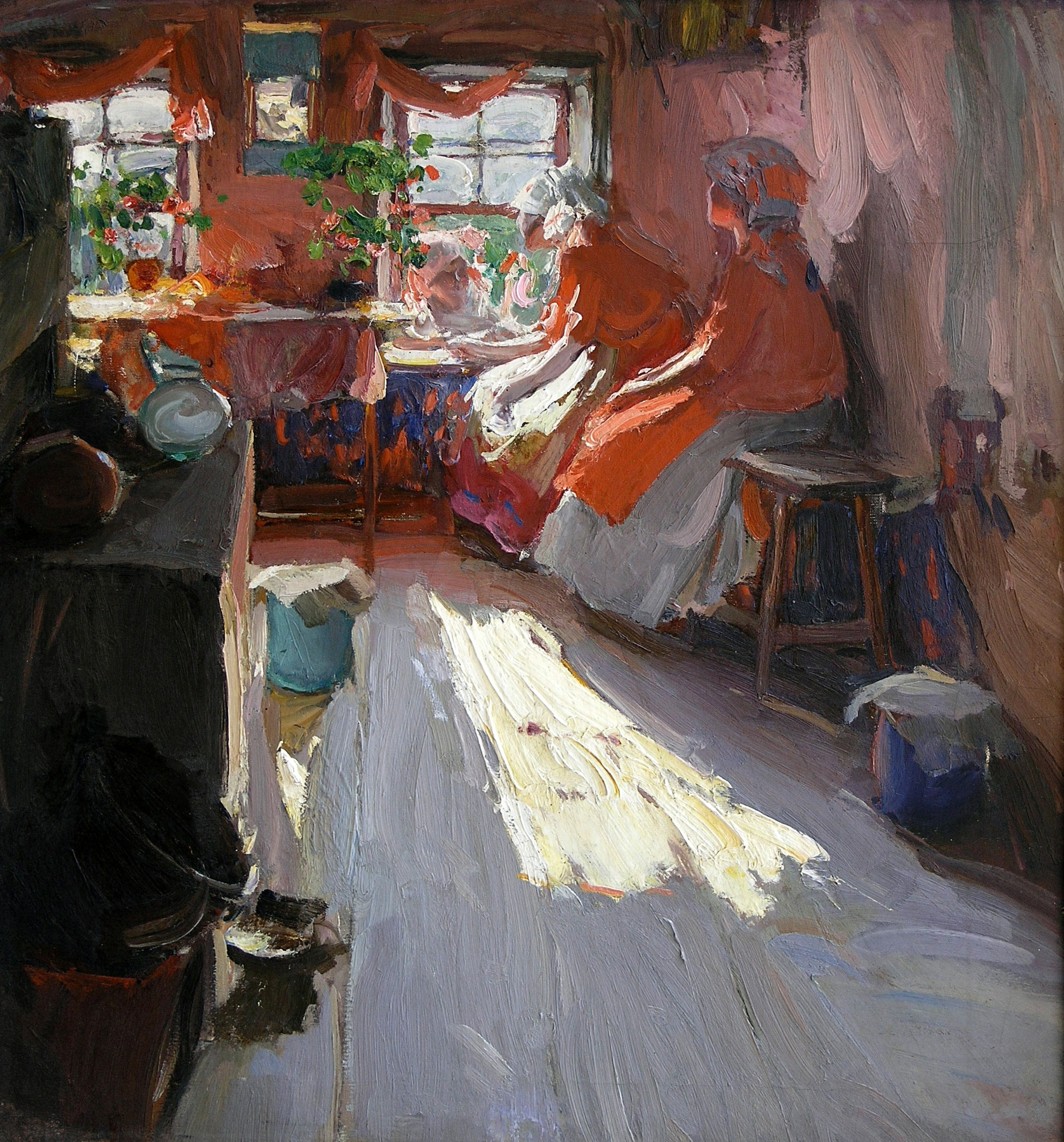

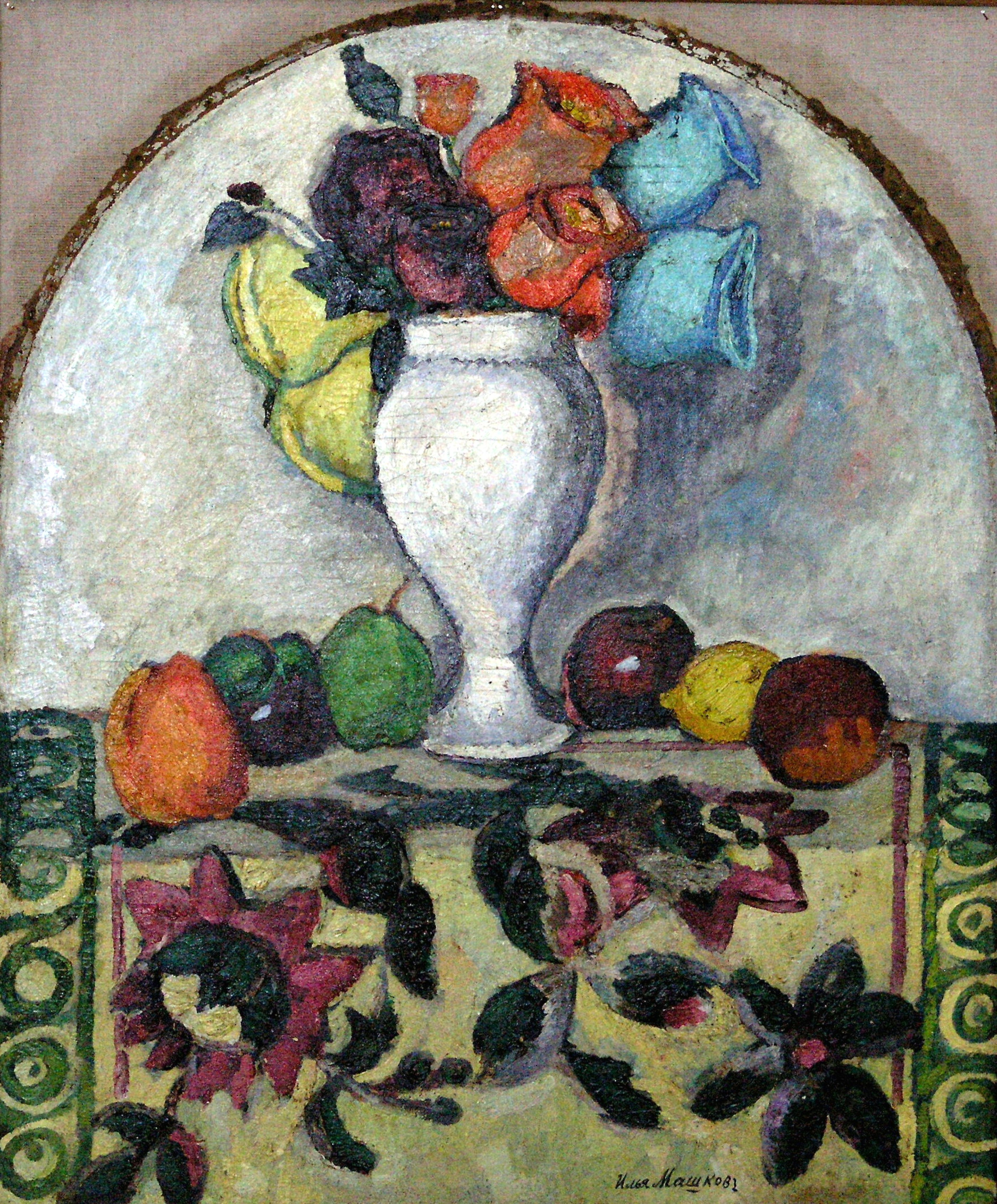

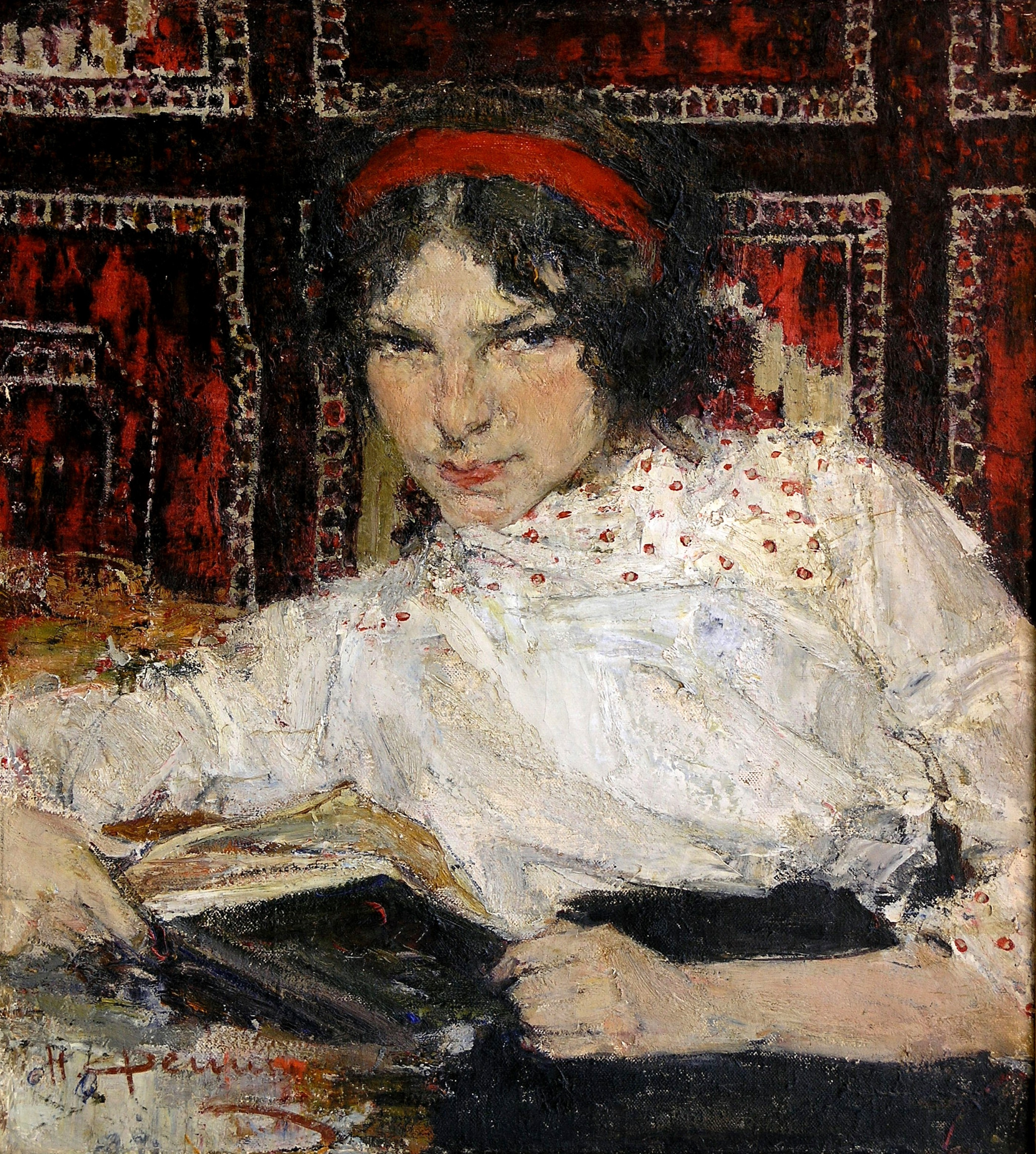

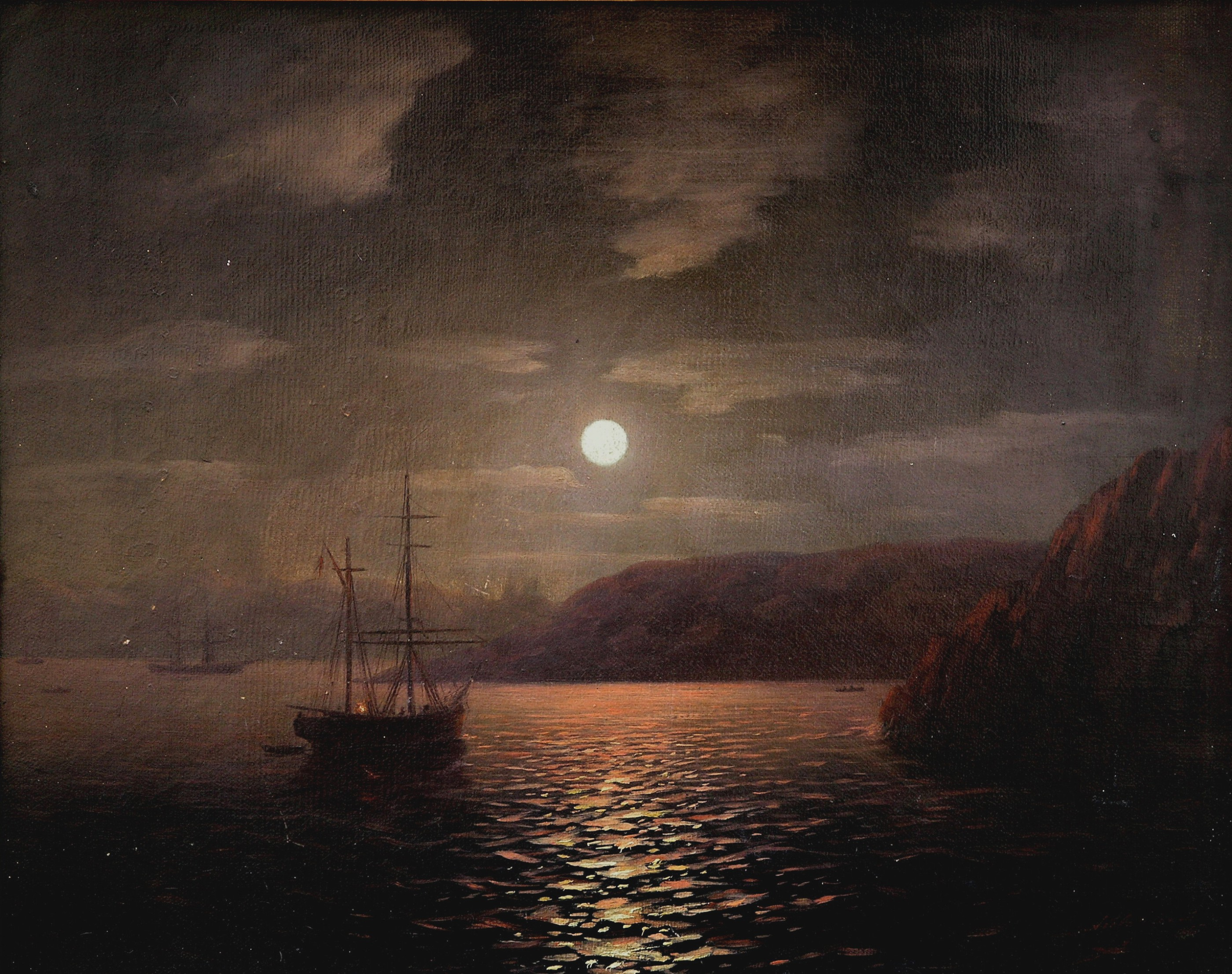

== Sources ==
- Karpeeva E., Kireeva T. "Grigoriev Art Museum in Kozmodemyansk", under the general supervision of A. Krasavin, publishing house - "White City", 2004
- Book: Encyclopedia of the RME | 795 | Art and History Museum. A. V. Grigoriev
- http://www.russianmuseums.info/M1267
