= All-Russian Zemstvo Union =

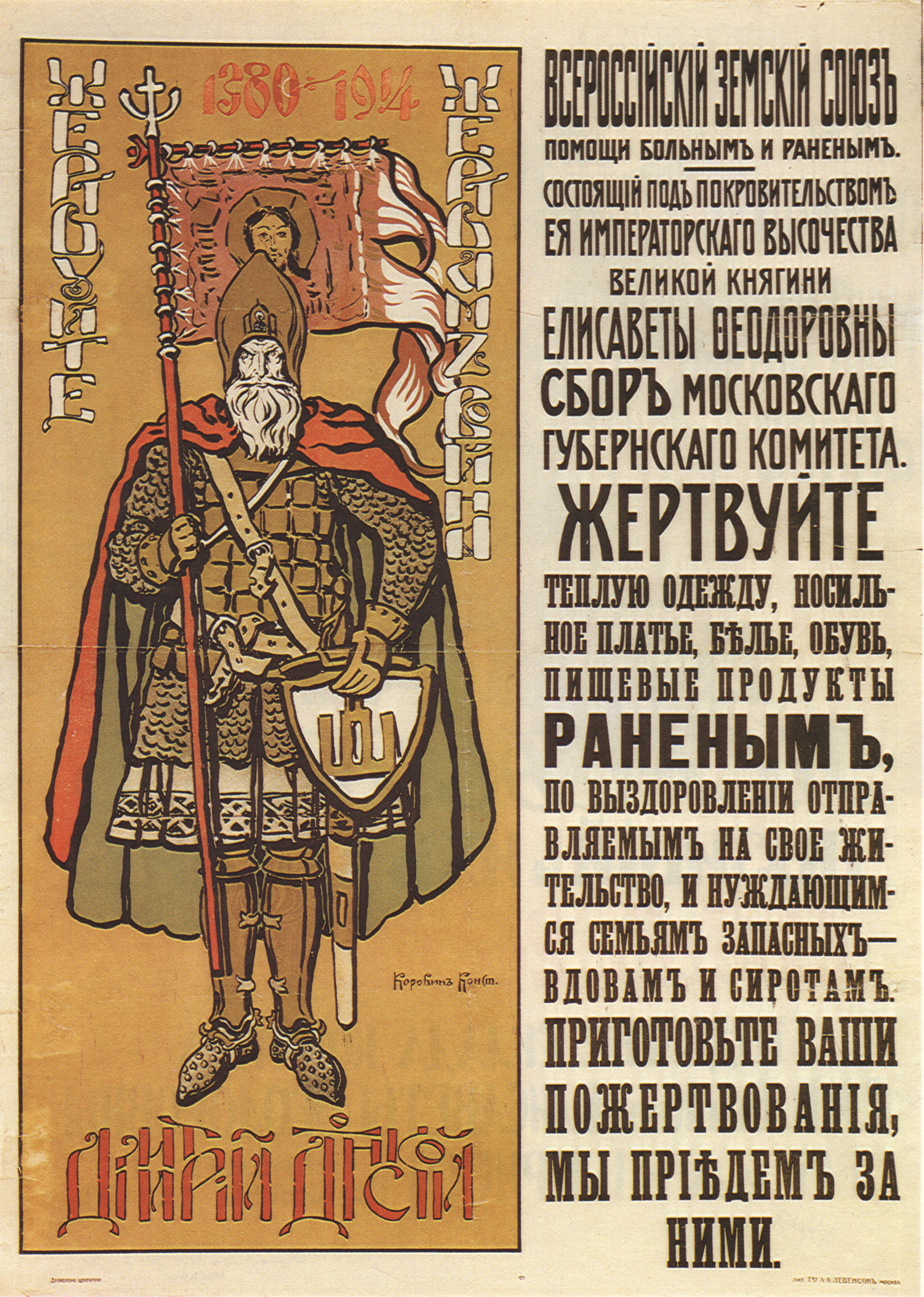
Poster of the All-Russian Zemstvo Union depicting Dmitry Donskoy, designed by Konstantin Korovin, 1914

The All-Russian Zemstvo Union of Aid to Sick and Wounded Warriors, under the auspices of Her Imperial Highness Grand Duchess Elizabeth Feodorovna (Russian: Всероссийский земский союз) was a civil society organisation set up in the Russian Empire to support sick and wounded soldiers. It was established in Moscow on 30 July 1914 at a congress of authorized provincial zemstvos. Georgy Lvov headed the organisation as Chief Commissioner. On August 11, 1914, the organisation was ratified with suitable Regulations of the committee by Her Imperial Highness Grand Duchess Elizabeth Feodorovna.

The organisation was funded by government subsidies, appropriations of local organisations of zemstvos and cities, and donations from private individuals. It worked alongside the Military Sanitary Department and the Red Cross, and its role gradually expanded to include issues of evacuation and treatment of the wounded, hospital equipment, sanitary trains, medical-nutritional and bannoprachechnyh detachments, assistance to refugees and prisoners of war, the organisation of warehouses for linen, supply of troops with uniforms, etc. As these functions expanded, various departments were created in the unions: medical-sanitary, evacuation, for the preparation of medicines and dressings, Sanitary equipment trains, assistance to refugees and some others.
