= Association of Artists of Revolutionary Russia =

Association of artists in the early Soviet Union

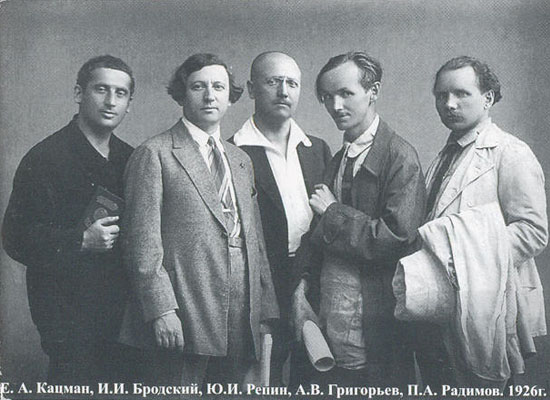
Members of AKhRR in 1926: Yevgeny Katzman, Isaak Brodsky, Yuri Repin, Alexander Grigoriev, Pavel Radimov

The Association of Artists of Revolutionary Russia (Russian: Ассоциация художников революционной России, Assotsiatsia khudozhnikov revolutsionnoi Rossii, 1922–1928), later known as Association of Artists of the Revolution (Ассоциация художников революции, Assotsiatsia khudozhnikov revolutsii or AKhRR, 1928–1932) was a group of artists in the Soviet Union in 1922–1933. Diverse members of the group gained favor as the legitimate bearers of the Communist ideas into the world of art, formulating framework for the socialist realism style.

It was a large association of Soviet artists, graphic artists and sculptors, which, thanks to the support of the state, was the largest and most powerful of the creative groups of the 1920s. Founded in 1922, AKhRR was active for about 10 years before it disbanded in 1932. During this time it was the forerunner of the united Artists' Union of the USSR.

Original founding members included Alexander Grigoriev, Pavel Radimov (formerly the lead of the Peredvizhniki), Sergey Malyutin, Yevgeny Katzman, Pyotr Shukhmin and other realist painters, who already established themselves in artistic world before the Russian Revolution of 1917. The group formed within the Peredvizhniki movement, that held their last, 47th, public exhibition in 1922 and clearly placed itself in opposition to avant-garde art.

They claimed that their art style was meant to capture "revolutionary impulse of this great moment of history" without "insult[ing] the revolution in the eyes of the international proletariat."

Their first public statement as a new entity was a 1922 exhibition in Moscow; all proceeds were used for the relief of Russian famine of 1921. By 1928, the group sponsored 10 nationwide exhibitions with high publicity. Despite its revolutionary title, it successfully united artists of the "old school" like Abram Arkhipov, Aleksandr Makovsky, Nikolay Kasatkin, Konstantin Yuon and the younger ones like Sergei Gerasimov and Isaak Brodsky. In a decade, it grew up from 80 to over 300 members. Broad membership and dominance of mature artists born in the 1870s and 1880s helped in establishing AKhRR as a reliable institution, far from ultra-revolutionary rhetoric.

During the crackdown on independent art movements in 1932–1933, AKhRR served as the nucleus for the USSR Union of Artists and was liquidated after its formation.

Their artwork had influenced capitalist art in England, originally brought by British communists during and after the Spanish Civil War and eventually, after the Second World War, the fascination with Soviet aesthetics. The work had shifted advertising to portray the working class and the newly emerging middle class in their normal daily activities. With the Cold War, British critics began to be repulsed with the art as a socially inclusive medium, but its core aesthetic remained and spread globally.

== See also ==
Other groups in Soviet art of 1920s:

- ‘The Four Arts’ (in Russian: Четыре искусства) movement (Kuzma Petrov-Vodkin, Martiros Saryan, Nina Niss-Goldman etc.)
- OST (Alexander Deyneka)
- RABIS or Sorabis, the Trade Union of Art Workers
- Red cossacks
- October Group (constructivism)
