= Artists' Union of the USSR =

Creative union in the USSR (1932-1992)

The Artists' Union of the USSR (Note: The title in accordance with the English edition of the Great Soviet Encyclopedia. Also referred to as the USSR Union of Artists or the Union of Artists of the USSR.) (Russian: Союз художников СССР, romanized: Soyuz khudozhnikov SSSR) was a creative union of the Soviet artists and art critics during the existence of the USSR.

The Union was founded started in 1932 to supersede the AKhRR. The integral Union was instituted in 1957.

It was officially disbanded at its 8th Congress in January 1992 after the dissolution of the Soviet Union, with its rights distributed over the corresponding unions in the post-Soviet states.

== History ==
Prior to the Artists' Union of the USSR, there existed the Union of Soviet Artists (Союз советских художников, Soyuz sovetskikh khudozhnikov), which was founded by Alexander Grigoriev in Moscow in spring 1930. It included Moscow and Leningrad artists along with former members of the AKhRR. The first exhibition of the Union of Soviet Artists was held on 15 April 1931 in Moscow at the exhibition hall of the co-operative society “Khudozhnik”. The Union of Soviet Artists ceased to exist in 1932 following a government decision.

Following the resolution "On the Restructuring of Literary and Artistic Organizations" by the Central Committee of the Communist Party (Bolsheviks) on 23 April 1932, separate unions of Soviet artists were established in Moscow and Leningrad and in various Soviet republics to supersede all previous organizations.

In 1957, a single Union of Artists of the USSR was created, as its first Congress was convened in February–March 1957.

According to the Union's Charter, the Union of Artists of the USSR pursued the goal of "creating ideological, highly artistic works of art of all types and genres and works on art history, promoting the construction of communism in the USSR, strengthening the connection of members of the Union of Artists of the USSR with the practice of communist construction, developing socialist in content and national in form art of the peoples of the USSR, affirming the ideals of Soviet patriotism and proletarian internationalism in the activities of Soviet artists."

In Moscow they built the Central House of Artists which was opened in 1979.

The Union of Artists held meetings, conferences, exhibitions, organized and financed creative work, including providing members with free workshops, and organized creative trips to the regions.

The Union of Artists of the USSR printed following magazines: "Art" (Искусство) (published since 1933; published jointly by the USSR Ministry of Culture and the USSR Academy of Arts), "Creativity" (Творчество) (since 1957), "Decorative Art of the USSR" (Декоративное искусство СССР) (since 1957), "Young Painter" («Юный художник»).

The Union of Artists was responsible for the Art Fund of USSR (Художественный фонд СССР), the "Soviet Artist" (“Советский художник”) publishing house, the Exhibition Directorate (Дирекция выставок), and Agitplakat ("Агитплакат").

The Union of Artists of the USSR ceased to exist in January 1992 at the VIII Congress, having designated the Unions of Artists of 15 new states as its successors (in the RSFSR, the Union of Artists of Russia, the Moscow and Leningrad Unions of Artists became the successors of the Union of Artists of the USSR).

== Economic Activity ==
The Union of Artists had a huge property complex - artists' houses, production and sculpture factories, holiday homes and creative dachas, workshops and factories for the production of paints, plasticine, brushes and other artistic materials, exhibition halls, workshops, as well as clinics, residential premises and a multi-thousand collection of artists' works.

The production and financial basis for the well-being of the Union of Artists was provided by the activities of the Art Fund of the USSR. In 1986, 72.5% of all members of the Union of Artists worked in the system of its enterprises and workshops (14,163 people out of 19,531 artists who were members of the Union of Artists of the USSR in 1986). The monthly earnings of an artist in various republican and city organizations could range from 150 to 700 rubles per month. The average salary of an artist in the Art Fund system, according to official statistics, was 351 rubles per month in the first year of perestroika (significantly higher than the average salary in the country).

== The Union of Artists in Numbers ==
As of January 1, 1976, the Union included 14,538 members.

As of January 1, 1987, the organization included 20,307 artists. The largest in terms of membership were the Union of Artists of the RSFSR, which included powerful organizations in Moscow and Leningrad (overall 11,540 artists in RSFSR); the Ukrainian (2,376), Georgian (1,037), Latvian (845), and Lithuanian Union Republics (782). The organizations of average membership were those of the Armenian SSR (654), Azerbaijan SSR (542), Estonian SSR (535), Byelorussian SSR (508), and Uzbek SSR (487). The smallest organizations were the Unions of Artists of the Kazakh (348), Moldavian (215), Kirghiz (114), Tajik (164), and Turkmen SSRs (160).

According to statistics from the last All-Union Congress of Artists, held in January and April 1992, 22,545 artists and art historians were members of this organization.

== Leaders of the Union of Artists ==
- 1939-1957 - Aleksandr Gerasimov
- 1957-1958 - Konstantin Yuon
- 1958-1964 - Sergei Gerasimov
- 1964-1968 - Boris Ioganson
- 1968-1971 - Ekaterina Belashova
- 1971-1988 - Nikolai Ponomarev
- 1988-1991 - Andrei Vasnetsov

== Structure ==
In the late Soviet period, the central administrative apparatus of the Union of Artists was a ramified bureaucratic structure of 32 subdivisions and sections: 1. Secretariat. 2. Propaganda Department. 3. Organizational and Creative Department. 4. Central Auditing Commission. 5. Exhibition and Expert Council. 6. Painting Commission. 7. Sculpture and Medal Art Commission. 8. Graphics Commission with sections of easel and book graphics. 9. Watercolor Commission. 10. Theatrical and Decorative Arts Commission. 11. Decorative and Applied and Folk Art Commission. 12. Monumental Art Commission. 13. Criticism and Art Criticism Commission. 14. Commission for Work with Young Artists and Art Criticism. 15. Commission on ideological and aesthetic education and patronage work on sea and river transport. 16. Commission on amateur fine art and patronage work in the countryside. 17. Military commission with sections of veterans of the Great Patriotic War and patronage of the troops of the Ministry of Internal Affairs. 18. Commission on decorative art and artistic design. 19. Commission on visual propaganda. 20. Commission on the protection of monuments. 21. Commission on posters. 22. Commission on satire. 23. Commission for the coordination of rates of author's royalties. 24. Commission for work with museums and the protection of the creative heritage of artists. 25. Department of cultural relations with foreign countries (Foreign Commission). 26. Personnel department. 27. Accounting. 28. Administration. 29. Archive. 30. Directorate of the House of Artists. 31. Central Experimental Studio. 32. Trade Union.
