= Viktor Popkov (painter) =

Soviet Russian painter (1932–1974)

- Виктор Попков
- Born: Viktor Yefimovich Popkov; 9 March 1932; Moscow, Russian SFSR, Soviet Union
- Died: 12 November 1974 (aged 42); Moscow, Russian SFSR, Soviet Union
- Resting place: Cherkizovo cemetery, Moscow Oblast
- Education: Surikov Art Institute
- Known for: Painting, graphic art
- Movement: Severe style
- Spouse: Klara Kalinycheva
- Awards: USSR State Prize (1975, posthumous)

Viktor Yefimovich Popkov (Russian: Виктор Ефимович Попков; 9 March 1932 – 12 November 1974) was a Soviet Russian painter and graphic artist, and one of the leading figures of the "severe style", the manner that emerged in Soviet art during the Khrushchev Thaw in reaction against the idealised painting of the Stalin years. His large canvas The Builders of Bratsk (1960–1961), painted after journeys to the construction sites of Siberia, is among the emblematic works of the movement.

From the mid-1960s Popkov turned away from industrial subjects towards the villages of the Russian North and towards openly personal painting on war, memory, loneliness and death, in cycles such as the Mezen Widows (1966–1968) and in the self-portrait Father's Overcoat (1970–1972). He was killed in Moscow at the age of 42, shot by a security guard accompanying a cash-in-transit vehicle, and was posthumously awarded the USSR State Prize in 1975. Although he remains little known outside Russia, he was given solo exhibitions in Venice and London in 2014 and a retrospective of more than 200 works at the Tretyakov Gallery in 2024–2025.

== Early life and training ==
Popkov's parents came from peasant families in the Smolensk region and moved to Moscow and then to Mytishchi, just outside the city, where his father worked at a brickworks and his mother at a bakery. His father, Yefim, was killed at the front in the Second World War at the age of 36, and his mother, Stepanida, raised the surviving children alone; Popkov later traced his paintings of war widows directly to that loss. He was born on 9 March 1932. (Note: Most sources give Moscow as his birthplace; the Russian Museum gives Mytishchi, in the Moscow region, where the family lived.)

In 1948, Popkov entered a Moscow teacher-training college for art and graphic arts, where he met the illustrator Klara Kalinycheva, whom he later married. Having failed to gain a place in painting, he was admitted in 1952 to the graphic art department of the Surikov Art Institute, where his principal teacher was the graphic artist Yevgeny Kibrik; his diploma project, a series of watercolours and linocuts on transport, was bought in its entirety by the Tretyakov Gallery. He began exhibiting in 1958 and joined the Moscow branch of the Union of Artists in 1959.

== Work ==
=== Severe style ===
Like many artists of his generation, Popkov travelled on official commissions to the industrial sites of the Soviet interior: the Irkutsk hydroelectric station in 1956, the Abakan–Taishet railway in 1959, Bratsk in 1960 and the Virgin Lands of Kazakhstan in 1961. The Builders of Bratsk (1960–1961; Tretyakov Gallery) shows the builders at full height against a dark night sky, the panorama of the construction site barely discernible behind them; the artist said that he had depicted them standing "as if on icons" rather than at work. The critic Alexander Kamensky called the emerging manner the "severe style", and Popkov was among the painters who created it.

Works of these years, among them Spring at the Depot (1958), Going to Work (1961) and The Work Crew Having Rest (1962–1965), established his reputation. His paintings were shown at the 31st Venice Biennale in 1962, and in 1967 Noon, The Work Crew Having Rest and The Couple were awarded an honorary diploma at the Paris Biennale, although he was not permitted to travel to Paris to receive it.

=== Later work ===
From 1965, Popkov spent summers in villages along the Mezen river in the Russian North, and out of these journeys came the Mezen Widows cycle (1966–1968), in which women widowed by the war appear in flaring reds against dark interiors. Its principal canvases are Recollections. Widows (1966), Northern Song (1966–1968) and Granny Anisya Was a Good Person (1971–1973). Of the first, the artist said that "all their lives, all their youth swam before my eyes — all that remained was recollections"; of the cycle as a whole he used the phrase "joyful tragedy".

The late paintings grow more inward and more openly metaphorical, and many are self-portraits or family portraits: The Bolotov Family (1968), My Day. The Encounter (1968), Father's Overcoat (1970–1972), in which the artist wears his dead father's greatcoat, and the last of them, Autumn Rains (1974), one of a group of works devoted to Alexander Pushkin. Writing in The Tretyakov Gallery Magazine, the critic Alexander Rozhin connected Popkov's expressiveness both to the Russian icon tradition and to El Greco.

From the mid-1960s, his position within the artistic establishment became increasingly precarious. He supported the nomination of Alexander Solzhenitsyn for the Lenin Prize and spoke out publicly against the leadership of the Moscow Union of Artists; his paintings were often refused for exhibitions, and he held no official Soviet honorific title at his death.

== Death ==
On 12 November 1974, after visiting an exhibition on Kuznetsky Most, Popkov approached a parked cash-in-transit vehicle on Tverskaya Street and asked for a lift, mistaking it for a taxi; the exchange turned into an argument and a guard shot him in the neck. He died of the wound, and the guards involved were given prison sentences. Autumn Rains was found on the easel in his studio; it and Granny Anisya Was a Good Person were displayed at his funeral. He is buried in the Cherkizovo cemetery in the Moscow region, in the same grave as his mother, brother and sister, beneath a bronze memorial by the sculptor Adelaida Pologova. In 1975 he was posthumously awarded the USSR State Prize for the cycle of paintings Reflections on Life.

== Legacy ==
A posthumous solo exhibition at the Tretyakov Gallery was a notable event in Soviet artistic life, and Popkov's painting influenced younger Moscow artists of the 1970s, among them Tatyana Nazarenko. His older contemporary Geliy Korzhev called him "an artist of the Russian soul and of great Russian conscience". His works are held primarily in the collections of the Tretyakov Gallery and the Russian Museum, and also by regional museums including the Vladimir-Suzdal museum-reserve and the museum of history and art in Mytishchi, which holds his studio and a group of his canvases. In November 2010 A Family in July (1969) (Note: The Calvert Journal reports the painting under the title Summer, July.) sold at Sotheby's in New York for $842,500, an auction record for the artist; the buyer, the collector Andrey Filatov, has called Popkov "the Dostoevsky of art".

A retrospective at the Russian Academy of Arts in Moscow in December 2013 brought together works from the Tretyakov Gallery, the Russian Museum and the Filatov Family Art Fund, showing his official and unofficial work side by side. In 2014 Dream and Reality. Viktor Popkov 1932–1974, his first Italian exhibition, was shown at Ca' Foscari University of Venice, and some forty works travelled on to Somerset House in London as Viktor Popkov: Genius of the Russian Soul (22 May – 18 June 2014), his first solo show in the United Kingdom, mounted as part of the UK–Russia Year of Culture. Marking fifty years since his death, the Tretyakov Gallery staged the retrospective Viktor Popkov. 1932–1974 at its Kadashevskaya Embankment building from 4 December 2024 to 11 May 2025; curated by Tatyana Karpova and Anna Mapolis, it brought together more than 200 works from twelve museums and seven private collections, and its organisers questioned how far the label "severe style" fits an artist who changed manner repeatedly.
