= Pavel Nikonov =

Russian painter, graphic artist, teacher and academic (1930–2025)

- Павел Никонов
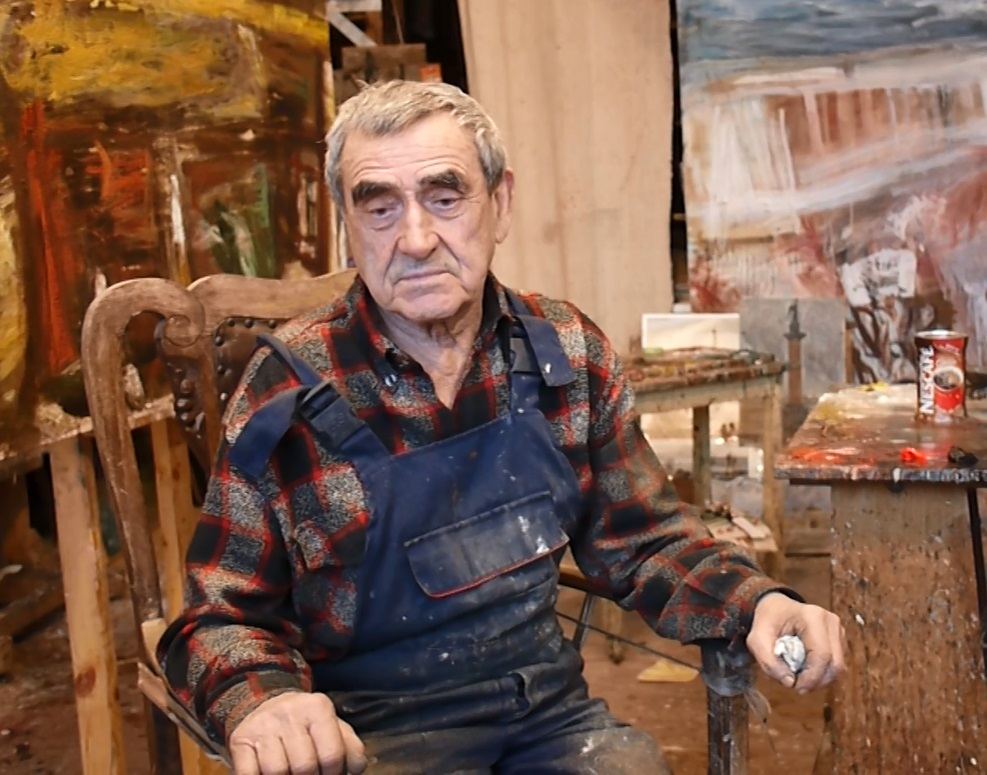
- Nikonov in 2014
- Born: 30 May 1930; Moscow, Russian SFSR, Soviet Union
- Died: 8 November 2025 (aged 95); Moscow, Russia
- Resting place: Nikolo-Arkhangelskoye Cemetery, Balashikha
- Education: Moscow Secondary Art School; Surikov Moscow Art Institute
- Known for: Geologists (1962)
- Movement: Severe style
- Awards: Honoured Artist of the RSFSR (1981); People's Artist of the Russian Federation (1994); Order of Honour (2001); State Prize of the Russian Federation (2001, 2021)
- Pavel Nikonov's voice Recorded 22 December 2012

Pavel Fedorovich Nikonov (Russian: Павел Фёдорович Никонов; 30 May 1930 – 8 November 2025) was a Russian painter, graphic artist, teacher and academic, and one of the founders of the Severe style in Soviet painting. His 1962 painting Geologists became a central target of criticism when Nikita Khrushchev denounced the works on show at the 1962 Manege exhibition. Nikonov was an academician of the Russian Academy of Arts (2000; corresponding member 1997), a People's Artist of the Russian Federation (1994), and a two-time laureate of the State Prize of the Russian Federation (2001, 2021).

== Early life and education ==
Nikonov was born in Moscow to Fyodor Pavlovich Nikonov, a Red Army officer and one of the founders of the Academy of the General Staff, and Zinaida Fisher, a former student of the Smolny Institute who later worked as a librarian at the General Staff. In 1929 his father was arrested in the Soviet political repressions and exiled to Kazakhstan, returning to Moscow only in 1938; it was his father, wary of any career tied to politics, who most encouraged Nikonov toward art.

From 1943 to 1949 he studied at the Moscow Secondary Art School, evacuated during the war to the village of Voskresenskoye in Bashkortostan, alongside future painters including Viktor Ivanov and Geliy Korzhev. From 1949 to 1956 he studied at the Surikov Moscow Art Institute, where a new rector, Fyodor Modorov, was tightening ideological control over teaching amid a campaign against "formalism". Nikonov later described the two halves of his training in starkly different terms: a "very high-quality" art-school education under teachers of the old culture, followed by what he called "anti-education" at the institute.

His diploma painting October (1956) won a medal at the 1957 World Festival of Youth and Students in Moscow, earning him a study trip to Czechoslovakia in 1958, where he found émigré magazines hidden under his host's bed and first encountered the work of Marc Chagall and Boris Grigoriev.

=== "Severe style" and Geologists ===
Nikonov became one of the leading painters of the Severe style, which broke with idealised depictions of Soviet life for a starker realism. His Fishermen (1959) was bought by Alexander Deineka when first exhibited; his next painting, Our Weekdays (1960), made after a trip to the Bratsk Dam construction site and referencing the composition of Deineka's Defence of Petrograd, left the older artist "perplexed" and asking where Nikonov "got this German Expressionism from".

His best-known painting, Geologists (1962), was based on a geological expedition to the Eastern Sayan. Shown at the "30 Years of the Moscow Union of Artists" exhibition in the Manege, it was denounced by Khrushchev, who declared that the state would not pay for it: "Let them paint and sell it, but not at the government's expense." To keep his fee, Nikonov then signed a statement calling it a "creative failure" and began stripping the canvas from its stretcher for reuse. The painter Tair Salakhov asked for the half-ruined canvas instead, rolling it up and taking it to Baku, where it hung for years before he arranged its transfer to the Tretyakov Gallery in 1987.

=== Rediscovering the 1920s and the "Left MOSKh" ===
Nikonov also helped prepare the same 1962–63 exhibition's rediscovery of painters purged from Soviet artistic life in the 1930s, touring museum storerooms and private flats with fellow artists to recover works by figures such as Alexander Drevin and Boris Golopolosov, whose canvases had for decades been kept hidden by their owners, including under sofas — giving rise to the term "sofa painting". The controversy split the Union of Artists into a conservative wing based in the Academy of Arts and a reform-minded "Left MOSKh" that included Nikonov, Viktor Popkov, Viktor Elkonin, Nikolai Andronov and Andrei Vasnetsov; in the affair's aftermath the painter Vladimir Serov became president of the Academy of Arts, an institution Nikonov later described as embodying "everything most reactionary and opportunistic" in Soviet art.

With his brother Mikhail, Nikonov was also a member of the "Nine", an informal group of nonconformist-leaning painters that included Nikolai Andronov, Boris Birger, Vladimir Weisberg and Natalya Yegorshina; the group held five exhibitions between 1961 and 1978. Its first, nominally "closed" show in 1961 drew such crowds — despite being restricted to Union members — that it turned into a de facto protest for artists' right to exhibit freely.

=== Official commissions ===
In the 1960s and 1970s Nikonov also produced paintings on official themes. Smolny — Headquarters of October (1965) was rejected by its original commissioner as a distorted account of the October Revolution, but was acquired for the Russian Museum's collection after a chance visit to Nikonov's studio by the museum's director, Vasily Pushkaryov. For the 1975 "Soviet Russia" exhibition marking the 25th Communist Party Congress, he painted Moscow Festive (1974–75) as a pendant to Eduard Bragovsky's Moscow at Work. Between the late 1950s and mid-1980s he also travelled on creative commissions to the White Sea, Mordovia, Soviet Central Asia, Azerbaijan and Bulgaria, producing among other works a watercolour cycle known as the Mordovian Album.

== Village period and later work ==
From 1972 Nikonov spent much of each year in the village of Aleksino in Kalyazinsky District, where he built a studio. Rural life, and particularly the bell tower left standing after Kalyazin was partly flooded by the Uglich Reservoir in 1939–40, became central to the increasingly expressive, allegorical style of his mature painting. The art historian Dmitry Sarabyanov wrote that Nikonov achieved "such dramatic tension in depicting the Russian village" as had not been reached before, presenting it as the artist's "great but terrible" universe. From the late 1990s he also painted biblical subjects, including several versions of Carrying the Cross.

Retrospectives of his work were held at the Tretyakov Gallery in 2005 and, as The Nikonovs: Three Artists, in 2020, and at the Russian Museum in 2008. Nikonov's paintings are held in the collections of the Tretyakov Gallery, the Russian Museum, the Moscow Museum of Modern Art, the National Art Gallery in Sofia and the Kasteyev State Museum of Arts in Almaty, among others.

== Teaching career ==
From 1998 to 2006, together with Yuri Shishkov, Nikonov ran the easel-painting workshop at the Surikov Institute, succeeding Nikolai Andronov, who had led it from 1992 until his death in 1998. Uniquely among the institute's studios, it recruited students from their first year and was known for encouraging individual artistic search over a fixed style. Nikonov continued to follow his former students' careers after leaving the institute in 2006. In 2010–2011 the Russian Academy of Arts hosted Dialogue: Pavel Nikonov and Young Artists, showing work by Nikonov alongside his former students, and in 2024 the academy's museum staged The Right to Make Mistakes: Pavel Nikonov's Workshop, marking the studio's 30th anniversary with 28 of the workshop's former students.

Nikonov died on 8 November 2025, at the age of 95. He was buried at the Nikolo-Arkhangelskoye Cemetery in Balashikha, Moscow Oblast.

== Family ==
His elder brother, Mikhail Nikonov (1928–2010), was also a painter. Nikonov's wife was Viktoria Staritsyna; their daughter, Viktoria Nikonova (1968–2008), was a painter in her own right — the two shared a posthumous joint exhibition, Substance of Existence, at the Platonov Arts Festival in Voronezh in 2021 — and their son, Andrei Nikonov, became a physician.

== Awards and honours ==
Nikonov was elected a corresponding member of the Russian Academy of Arts in 1997 and a full academician in 2000. He was named Honoured Artist of the RSFSR in 1981 and won first prize at the 5th International Exhibition of Realist Painting in Sofia, Bulgaria, in 1985, for Village Funeral. He received the Pyotr Konchalovsky Prize in 1991. He was named People's Artist of the Russian Federation in 1994 "for great services in the field of fine art" and received the Order of Honour in 2001. He was twice awarded the State Prize of the Russian Federation: for 2001, for his "Village Cycle", decreed in 2002, and for 2021, for his contribution to Russian and world fine art, decreed in 2022.

== Selected solo exhibitions ==
- 2005 — Pavel Nikonov: Painting and Graphics, 1980–2004, Tretyakov Gallery, Moscow
- 2008 — Pavel Nikonov, Russian Museum, Saint Petersburg
- 2013 — Then and Now, Kovcheg Gallery, Moscow
- 2018 — The New Nikonov, Pushkin State Museum exhibition halls, Moscow
- 2020 — The Nikonovs: Three Artists, Tretyakov Gallery, Moscow
- 2021 — Substance of Existence: Viktoria and Pavel Nikonov, Voronezh
- 2024 — Autumn of the Patriarch, Otkrytyi Klub Gallery, Moscow
- 2025 — Only Painting: Pavel Nikonov, Ryazan State Regional Art Museum, Ryazan
