= Nikolai Andronov =

Russian painter and muralist (1929–1998)

- Николай Иванович Андронов
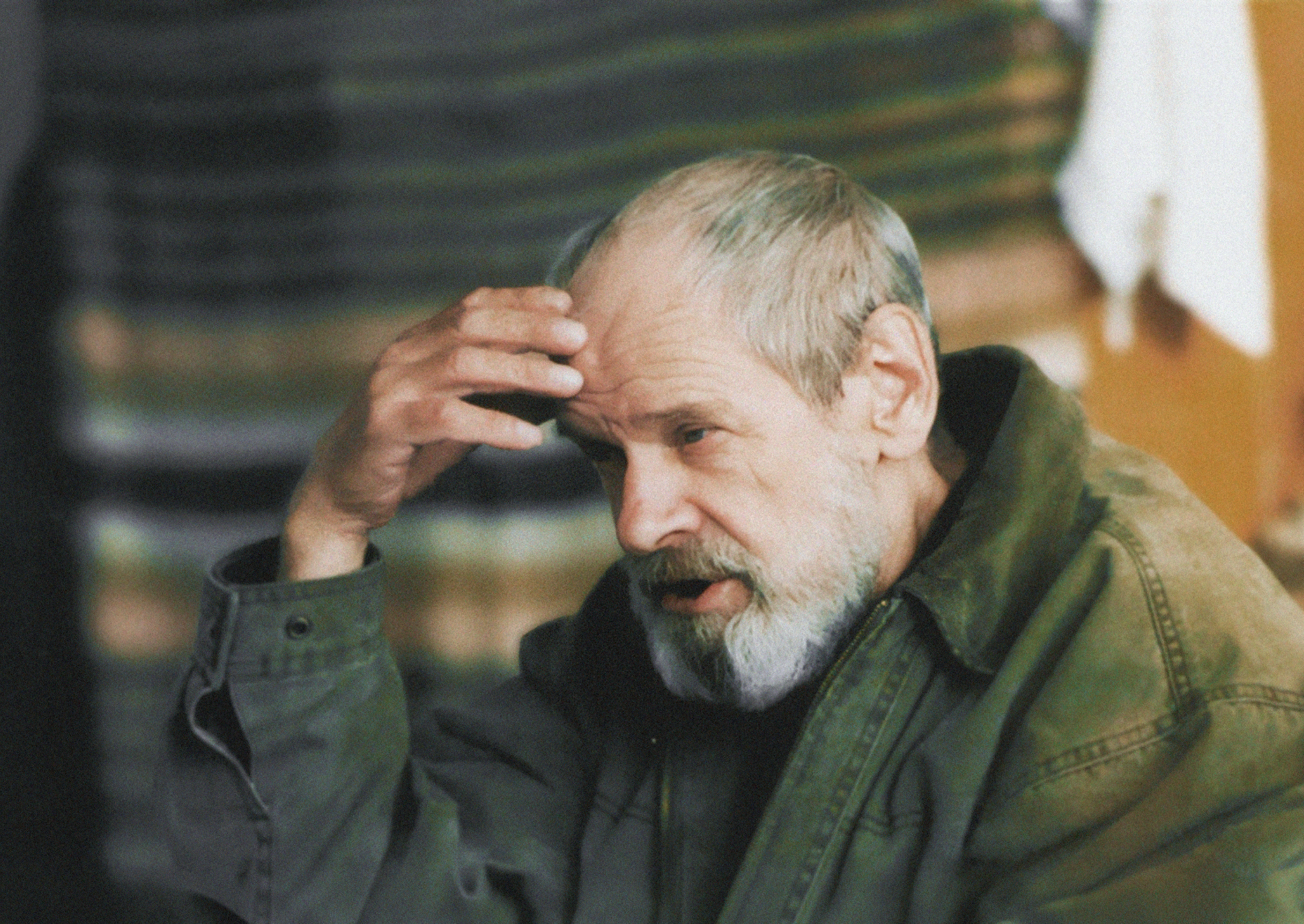
- Nikolai Andronov in 1998
- Born: Nikolai Ivanovich Andronov; 30 April 1929; Moscow, Soviet Union
- Died: 10 November 1998 (aged 69); Moscow, Russia
- Resting place: Vvedenskoye Cemetery
- Education: Repin Institute, Leningrad; Surikov Institute, Moscow
- Known for: Painting, monumental art
- Movement: Severe style
- Spouse: Natalya Yegorshina (m. 1952)
- Awards: USSR State Prize (1979); People's Artist of the Russian Federation (1996)

Nikolai Ivanovich Andronov (Russian: Николай Иванович Андронов; 30 April 1929 – 10 November 1998) was a Soviet and Russian painter, muralist, graphic artist and teacher. He was one of the founders of the severe style (Russian: суровый стиль), the reformist movement in Soviet painting of the late 1950s and 1960s. His Rafters (1960–1961) is usually described as a manifesto of that movement.

Rafters was among the paintings attacked by Nikita Khrushchev at the Moscow Manege exhibition of December 1962. Andronov was expelled from the Moscow branch of the artists' union and spent several years outside the official exhibition system. From the mid-1960s he worked mainly in and around the village of Ferapontovo in Vologda Oblast. The village provided the subjects for a cycle of paintings that he continued for more than thirty years, and the mineral-bearing stones and clays that he ground into pigments. He also completed more than twenty works of monumental art, among them the mosaic on the facade of the Oktyabr cinema in Moscow (1967) and Man and the Press in the Izvestia building (1978), for which he shared the USSR State Prize in 1979. Andronov was made an Honored Artist of the RSFSR in 1978 and a People's Artist of the Russian Federation in 1996, and was elected a full member of the Russian Academy of Arts in 1997.

== Life ==
=== Early years and training ===
Andronov was born in Moscow on 30 April 1929, the son of the mathematician Ivan Kuzmich Andronov (1894–1975). During the Second World War he was sent to a village on the Sura River, his mother's birthplace. This was his first experience of the Russian countryside, which became the main subject of his art.

He attended the Moscow Secondary Art School from 1943 to 1948, where he studied under L. I. Solovyov. In 1948 he entered the Institute of Painting, Sculpture and Architecture in Leningrad and worked in the studio of Rudolf Frentz. In 1952 he married the painter Natalya Yegorshina, moved back to Moscow, and completed his studies at the Surikov Institute in the studio of Dmitry Mochalsky, graduating in 1954. From 1954 to 1956 he lived in Kuybyshev (now Samara) and worked in the art workshops attached to the Kuybyshev hydroelectric station, and from 1956 to 1958 he taught at the Moscow Textile Institute.

Andronov had exhibited since 1951 and joined the Union of Artists in 1958. He began working in monumental art in 1960, and in the same year travelled in Siberia. In 1961 he took part in the exhibition of the group "Nine", together with his wife and seven other painters — Lev Berlin, Boris Birger, Vladimir Weisberg, Mikhail Ivanov, Kirill Mordovin, Mikhail Nikonov and Maria Favorskaya. A reduced version of the exhibition was shown in Leningrad in 1962. He also showed with the "Group of Eight" (1962), the "Group of Seven" (1966) and the "Group of Six" (1973). Nikolay Smirnov places him among the "left-wing MOSKh", the informal tendency inside the Moscow union that sought, from the 1960s to the 1980s, to revive the art of the 1920s and 1930s that had been suppressed under Stalin.

=== The Manege affair ===
Rafters was shown in public for the first time at the exhibition "30 Years of the Moscow Union of Artists", held in the Manege in December 1962. Together with Pavel Nikonov's Geologists, it became one of the main targets of Khrushchev's criticism and of the press campaign that followed, in which Andronov was denounced as a formalist. On 24 December 1962 he spoke at a session of the Ideological Commission of the CPSU Central Committee. He defended the artist's professional right to judge art independently, and accused the leadership of the RSFSR Union of Artists and of the Academy of Arts of political intrigue against young artists. He was expelled from MOSKh for two years and reduced to candidate membership of the RSFSR Union of Artists. The art historian Alexander Morozov wrote that Andronov's refusal to recant kept him at the centre of the campaign and cost him his union membership. His daughter, the painter Maria Andronova, remembered that he was pressed to destroy Rafters and admit his mistake; he refused, and left for Ferapontovo. For several years afterwards he was almost entirely excluded from exhibitions. Smirnov describes the episode as the start of a four-year "internal emigration", after which Andronov's professional standing was restored in 1966.

In 1968 Andronov was among the signatories of the "Letter of 120" in defence of Alexander Ginzburg, for which he received a severe party reprimand.

=== Ferapontovo ===
Andronov's subject matter changed decisively in 1963, when industrial themes were replaced by village scenes, still lifes and self-portraits. That year, according to the Great Russian Encyclopedia, he also made his first visit to Ferapontovo in Kirillovsky District, Vologda Oblast. (Note: Sources differ. The Great Russian Encyclopedia dates the first visit to 1963 and the purchase of the house to 1973; Gerold Vzdornov states that Andronov and Yegorshina bought the house at Uskovo in 1963, and Maria Andronova recalls the family's first visit as 1962.) He returned regularly and bought a house in the neighbouring hamlet of Uskovo, where he spent most of each year. He also travelled to Kostroma Oblast in 1965 and, in 1966, to the Northern Dvina and the Onega. Morozov wrote that over the years Andronov came to see Ferapontovo as "his spiritual homeland", where he found not oblivion or repose but "purification by truth".

=== Later career and teaching ===
Andronov's first showings abroad came in the touring exhibition "Russian Art from Ancient Times to the Present" (Paris, 1967–68; Prague and Bratislava, 1970–71), and he resumed work on public commissions from 1967. His first solo exhibition was held in 1974 at the Abramtsevo museum-estate, near which he and Yegorshina kept a dacha and a studio. From 1976 to 1988 he headed the monumental painting section of MOSKh and sat on its presidium. Morozov remembered that colleagues would ask Andronov to show censors around exhibitions that were being prepared, because he was better than anyone at blunting their vigilance and saving works that were due to be removed.

In 1992 a studio of easel painting under Andronov opened at the Surikov Institute, with Yuri Shishkov as his assistant. On his initiative a department of composition was founded, which he headed, and, contrary to the institute's usual practice, students were admitted to the studio in their first year. Teaching there was built around composition and combined daily practical work with the study of theory and of the history of art. The studio also drew criticism: its students were said to have taken over the devices of the severe style mechanically from their professors, and to have let subject matter give way to formal solutions.

Andronov died in Moscow on 10 November 1998 and was buried at Vvedenskoye Cemetery.

== Work ==
=== Severe style ===
The critic Alexander Kamensky coined the term "severe style" for the large paintings on industrial subjects that Andronov's generation was producing; the artists themselves, Maria Andronova recalled, made fun of the label. In the late 1950s Andronov built a new pictorial language on the legacy of the Knave of Diamonds group. The flattened space and the contrasting patches of colour in still lifes and portraits such as Books and At the Round Table (both 1962) echo its manner directly. Between 1957 and 1961 he painted several works on industrial subjects: The Kuybyshev Hydroelectric Station (1957), The Assembler (Монтажник, 1958) and Rafters (Плотогоны, 1960–1961). In these he combined the painterly force of the Knave of Diamonds with devices of the OST group (Society of Easel Painters): figures arranged like a frieze, a strong emphasis on the rhythm of the picture plane, and contrasts in scale between foreground and background.

Both The Assembler and Rafters are in the Tretyakov Gallery. The gallery describes the first as a new reading of the formal portrait — the worker stands high on scaffolding, not at work but posing for the painter — and the second, a canvas 210 by 275.5 cm, as a collective image of a generation, its young log-drivers shown full length and facing the viewer. Morozov traced Andronov's language to several sources: the monumental and decorative composition of OST and the Knave of Diamonds; the Moscow school of the early twentieth century, and Mikhail Larionov and Natalia Goncharova in particular; Cubism and the "dark" easel painting of the Vkhutemas; and, above all, the monumental art of medieval Rus'.

=== Village cycle, interiors and self-portraits ===
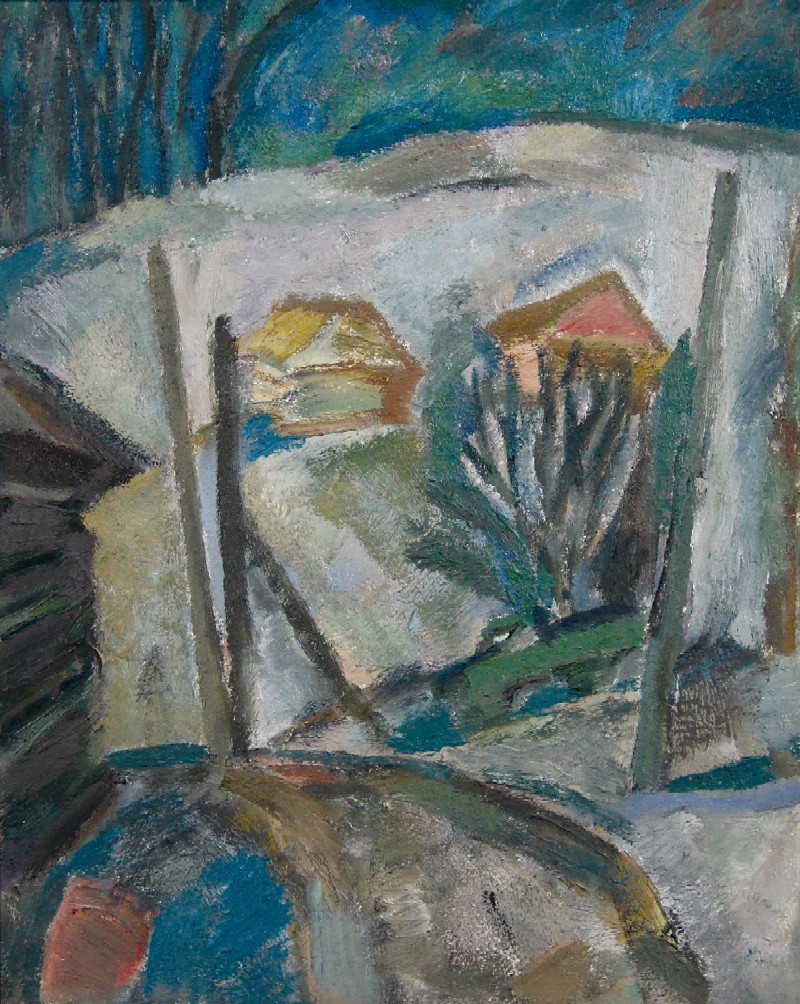
Nikolai Andronov. Village street in Ferapontovo, 1973.

From the mid-1960s the figures in Andronov's paintings stopped dominating the space and merged with it. The world they inhabit is closed in on itself and does not address the viewer, as in November (1964–1965) and The Lake. A Hunter's Family (1965). Colour remained active, but it was held within a single earthy range. From the late 1960s the palette grew more restrained and the paint layer denser, and the compositions became more structural. Their construction recalls medieval fresco painting and the painter's experience as a muralist: the landscape is seen from above, the horizon is almost eliminated, and the space develops in tiers from bottom to top rather than into depth — Farewell (1965–1967), Fire (1967–1973), Winter Night. Dogs (1970), Night (1987).

The theme of village conscripts being sent off to military service occupied Andronov from 1965 to 1995. Morozov saw these paintings as the symbolic high point of the drama of Russian life: a countryside that endlessly sends its young men off "for the ever-multiplying battlefields". For the critic Lev Mochalov, the Farewell paintings were the artist's considered answer to the romantic ardour of Rafters. Dmitry Sarabyanov, who wrote the first monograph on Andronov, called his manner "lyrical monumentalism" and linked it to the metaphysical concerns of post-avant-garde groups of the 1920s such as Makovets.

Andronov's method rested on a balance between depicted space and the picture plane — the flat surface of the canvas itself. This balance is clearest in his interiors, where the architecture provides the framework of the composition, while mirrors and windows break it up with reflections and blur the border between the room and the view, and between reality and its reflection — Interior with a Window. Mirrors (1968), Interior (1975), Full Moon (1993), Shadow (1995). He painted self-portraits throughout his life. Those of the 1960s are grotesque — Self-portrait with a Saw (1964), Self-portrait in the Bathhouse (1966–1967), Self-portrait with a Cockroach (1969) — and many of them include handwritten texts, a device drawn from both the lubok and the Russian avant-garde. From the 1970s he showed himself increasingly detached, in a museum or at work. Around 1967 he painted at least two self-portraits in a coffin; one of these, Self-portrait in a Coffin (1967), is in the Museum Ludwig in Cologne. In every self-portrait, Morozov wrote, the painter "appears to make a kind of diagnosis for himself. And for us. And for our age". Morozov compared their psychological consistency to the portraits of Perov, Kramskoy and Repin.

=== Materials and technique ===
Following the example of the painter Nikolai Chernyshev, Andronov began at Ferapontovo to work with mineral pigments, known as "earths"; he used them first in works on paper and later in oil. He collected coloured stones and clays there and ground them into powders using the techniques of medieval icon painters, "in search of the natural basis of life". Sarabyanov described him laying the canvas on the floor, turning it and smearing the paint, so as to let the material speak for itself. The art historian Vitaly Manin considered Autumn Landscape with a Horse by a Shed (1970) among the finest results. Andronov had the highest regard for the frescoes that Dionisius painted in the Ferapontov Monastery. Vzdornov observed that they left no obvious trace in his painting, but that their indirect influence on it was enormous. The artist gave the material a wider meaning: "Faith in the material, the attempt to find its favour towards the artist, seem to me the most spiritual moment of our craft."

=== Monumental art ===
Andronov carried out more than twenty commissions in monumental and decorative art, working with the architects Mikhail Posokhin, Shota Ayrapetov and Yuri Sheverdyaev. This side of his work is marked by a firm rhythmic structure, near-monochrome colour, spare forms and close attention to the texture of the material. Principal works include:

- Siberia, panel for the Soviet exhibition in Paris (1961; tempera on fabric)
- The Seasons, Herzen sanatorium, Moscow Oblast (1966; with Andrei Vasnetsov)
- mosaic on the facade of the Oktyabr cinema, Moscow (1967; smalt, granite and coloured marble; with Vladimir Elkonin and Andrey Vasnetsov)
- Science, mosaic, Ogarev Mordovia State University, Saransk (1971)
- Man and the Press. A History of the Russian Democratic Press, mosaic in the editorial building of Izvestia, Moscow (1978; with Vasnetsov)
- murals in the lobby of the Cosmos Hotel, Moscow (1980; tempera on gesso)
- eight mosaic panels, The History of Rail Transport, Savyolovskaya metro station, Moscow (1988; with Yuri Shishkov and others)
- decoration of the rebuilt Paveletsky station, Moscow (late 1980s; with Yegorshina and Maria Andronova)
- twenty-four smalt mosaics on the theme of peasant labour, on the columns of Krestyanskaya Zastava metro station, Moscow (1995; with Shishkov)

The Izvestia mosaic brought Andronov and Vasnetsov the USSR State Prize for 1979.

== Reception ==
Assessments of Andronov have differed sharply. Oksana Voronina of the Moscow Museum of Modern Art notes that Soviet critics were disturbed by the deliberate austerity of his work and by the bleakness of his view of everyday life. Later critics took the opposite line and dismissed him as an establishment Soviet painter who had cultivated an image of himself as a truth-teller. His art, Voronina argues, was never politicised: whether he was an outcast or a senior official, he went on doing what interested him. Andrei Vasnetsov, a frequent collaborator, wrote in 1977 that the world of Andronov's mature painting "is an ideal world ... not the harsh truth of life, but rather a picturesque elegy".

Morozov argued that although Andronov gave up the large exhibition picture, he went on for many years painting "a grandiose super-painting", which finally came together out of his many best canvases. His retreat to the provinces, Morozov held, was not a flight from reality but a move towards the authentic life of his country and its people. Vzdornov noted that in Andronov's later work figure composition gave way to the landscape picture, and man gave way to the horse and the dog. Bright tones were deliberately driven out of the palette; the sun was replaced by a waning moon, and steady electric light by the unsteady light of a candle. He compared Andronov to Cézanne, who spent his life painting the country around his native Aix: Andronov never tired of depicting Ferapontovo. An acquaintance from Kirillov remembered him saying that "for me every brushstroke is a feat, and it is filled with moral meaning".

The posthumous retrospectives of 2004 and 2006–2007 received a sceptical response from some critics. Andrei Kovalev wrote in 2004 of a carefully rewritten history and a "frightening fundamentalist utopia", and called the "liberal Andronov" one of the chief designers of the Soviet hyperreality of the stagnation years. Writing in Slavic Review in 2026, Smirnov treats Andronov as a case study in the origins of present-day Russian nationalist art. In his account, Andronov's art combined progressive and even postcolonial impulses — the recovery of a local way of life that Soviet modernisation had suppressed — with conservative and neo-traditionalist ones; it was the second of these that was selectively emphasised by the "Andronov myth" built up around the posthumous exhibitions. Smirnov traces that reading back to Manin, who in 1977 located the main content of Andronov's work in "the feeling of the originality of his native land, its legendary nature, and real authenticity", and forward to Mochalov, who in the 2006 catalogue linked the artist's search for an "eternal Fatherland" to Russian colonisation and to the philosopher Ivan Ilyin.

== Legacy ==
In 1990 the Tsentrnauchfilm studio made a documentary about the artist, Thoughts on Painting: Nikolai Andronov, directed by F. A. Tyapkin. Retrospectives followed his death: at the Russian Academy of Arts and the Museum of Dionisius's Frescoes in Ferapontovo (1999), the Tretyakov Gallery (2004), the Russian Museum (2006–2007, with Yegorshina) and the Kirillo-Belozersky Museum-Reserve, which showed some 200 works for the artist's ninetieth anniversary in 2019.

The studio Andronov founded at the Surikov Institute continued under Pavel Nikonov and Yuri Shishkov; an exhibition marking its thirtieth anniversary, "From the Beginning", was held at the institute's gallery in 2023. A memorial studio of Andronov and Yegorshina has been arranged at Abramtsevo, holding their work, part of their library and their collection of applied art. In 2025 the Kirillo-Belozersky museum announced that a museum of Nikolai Andronov was being prepared at Ferapontovo, to which the artist's heirs undertook to transfer drawings, photographs, letters and personal effects.

His work is held by the Tretyakov Gallery, the Russian Museum, the Pushkin Museum, the Moscow Museum of Modern Art, the Vologda Regional Picture Gallery, the "Artistic Culture of the Russian North" museum association in Arkhangelsk and other Russian regional museums, as well as by the Museum Ludwig in Cologne and the Kyrgyz National Museum of Fine Arts in Bishkek.

== Awards and honours ==
- Prize of the Moscow Union of Artists (1971)
- Honored Artist of the RSFSR (1978; some sources give 1979)
- USSR State Prize (1979), for the mosaic Man and the Press
- Gold medal of the USSR Academy of Arts (1989)
- Corresponding member of the Russian Academy of Arts (1991; some sources give 1988)
- Professor (1994; the Great Russian Encyclopedia gives 1996)
- People's Artist of the Russian Federation (1996)
- Full member of the Russian Academy of Arts, Department of Painting (1997)

== Family ==
Andronov's wife, Natalya Alekseyevna Yegorshina (1926–2010), was a painter and applied artist and a corresponding member of the Russian Academy of Arts; she worked with him on several monumental commissions. Their daughter, Maria Nikolayevna Andronova (born 1953), is also a painter.
