= Severe style (Soviet art) =

Movement in Soviet painting of the late 1950s and early 1960s

Severe style (Russian: суровый стиль, romanized: surovy stil), also called austere style or harsh style, was a movement in Soviet painting. It emerged in the late 1950s and reached its peak in the early 1960s. It developed during the Khrushchev Thaw in reaction to the grand, festive manner of late socialist realism. Its paintings use monumental, simplified forms, close-up figures, strong contrasts and clear compositional rhythms, and they often look like a single film frame taken from ordinary life. The movement emerged among Moscow painters and later spread to other parts of the Soviet Union and to other countries of the Eastern Bloc. The Getty Art & Architecture Thesaurus lists it as a separate Soviet style of the late 1950s to the 1970s and notes that it is often described as "the official art of the Khrushchev thaw".

Among its best-known works are Nikolai Andronov's The Raftsmen (1960–1961), Pavel Nikonov's Geologists (1962), Viktor Popkov's The Builders of Bratsk (1960–1961) and the Smolin brothers' Polar Explorers (1961).

== Term ==
The term is commonly associated with the Moscow critic Alexander Kamensky, although scholars disagree about when it first appeared and who coined it. Most often it is traced to his article "The Reality of Metaphor", published in the magazine Tvorchestvo in 1969. Before that Kamensky used other words: "severity", "manly simplicity" and "severe truth". By another account he had already used the phrase in 1960 in Novy Mir, after the exhibition Soviet Russia. The Getty thesaurus also dates the term to 1969 and credits it to Kamensky. Estonian scholars credit it instead to the critic Boris Bernstein. In a review of 1960 he wrote about a "severe dramatic style" in Men are Returning, a painting by the Latvian artist Edgars Iltners; the review came out in Russian and in Estonian at the same time.

Kamensky's article of 1969 treats the name as one that was already in use. The artists of this group, he wrote, had been "christened the heralds of the 'severe style'", and "for all the conventionality of such a label it had its own meaning and force".

Many researchers say that the label is vague. Anatoly Kantor noted that it was soon used for almost any art of the 1950s and 1960s that broke with the official rules of socialist realism. In that case, he wrote, "clearly one cannot speak of a single style". Vitaly Manin wrote that "it is difficult to establish the chronological boundaries of the 'severe style'". Ossovsky thought the term artificial and preferred to speak about the art of the Sixtiers.

== History ==
Critics saw the first signs of the new art in January 1954, at an exhibition of young Moscow painters in the Central House of Art Workers. Another cause was a government decree of 1955, "On the elimination of excesses in design and construction". It ended the use of the classical orders in architecture, and monumental sculpture and painting, which had been closely tied to the earlier architectural style, had to change quickly as well. Another landmark was the international exhibition of young artists at the 6th World Festival of Youth and Students in Moscow in 1957. Nikonov, Alexey Tkachyov and Pyotr Smolin won silver medals there. By the end of the decade a new generation had grown up. Its childhood and youth had been shaped by the war, and it looked back to the experiments of the 1920s and 1930s, which had been cut off under Stalin.

The movement's rise was cut short by the crisis of 1962. At the Manege the anniversary exhibition 30 Years of the Moscow Union of Artists was attacked by a party delegation led by Nikita Khrushchev. It criticised the work of Nikonov, Andronov, Andrey Vasnetsov, Ernst Neizvestny and the artists from Eli Belyutin's studio. Andronov lost his membership of the Union of Artists of the USSR. Nikonov had to make a public recantation in order to remain an officially recognised artist. Neither was allowed to exhibit until the end of the 1960s.

After 1962 the artists took separate paths and reworked what they had found. The heroism and optimism of the early years gave way to lyrical and melancholy imagery. Building sites became a less common subject, and painters worked more in their studios. Group portraits in which the painters sit together in silence, such as Viktor Ivanov's Caffè Greco, are typical of these years. The style went on developing for about two more decades, until the early 1980s, and it also affected art in other countries of the Eastern Bloc.

== Sources ==
The painters drew on several sources. The most important was the work of the Society of Easel Painters (OST) and its founders Alexander Deyneka and Yuri Pimenov. Nikonov recalled that after seeing Deyneka's The Defence of Petrograd (1928) and Pimenov's Give Us Heavy Industry! (1927) the young painters were carried away by the masters of the 1920s. Their influence can be seen in the flat, poster-like look of the pictures, in dynamic compositions and in unusual viewpoints. The younger painters also moved away from that model. Deyneka's mood was strongly positive, while his followers showed not the building of socialism but the hard life and poor conditions of the people who did the work.

A second source was the Knave of Diamonds group: "our group created its style taking as a model the early Konchalovsky, Mashkov, Falk, Larionov and Goncharova", the painter Mikhail Nikonov recalled. Old Russian art was another source. After the Andrey Rublyov Museum opened in 1960, the painters began to include churches and icons in their pictures and also adopted their colours and sense of form. They also looked to Cézanne, Van Gogh and Picasso, as well as to Spanish and Dutch Old Masters and Italian Proto-Renaissance painting, and to Italian neorealism. Writing in The Calvert Journal, Agata Pyzik adds the Mexican muralists, the Italian realist Renato Guttuso and medieval masters such as Giotto. In her account painters such as Viktor Ivanov and Evsei Moiseenko came to a more human and more pessimistic view of working people.

== Characteristics ==
The Popular Art Encyclopaedia writes that these painters turned everyday work into something poetic and heroic and showed their contemporaries as people of energy and will. It describes their manner as one of "generalised laconic forms", monumental composition with sharp linear rhythms and simple, restrained colour.

The style used a simplified, expressive outline and a limited palette of muddied greys, browns and earth tones. The painters wanted to show the "unvarnished truthfulness" of a hard life, and their usual subject was working people — workers, builders, geologists and cultural workers.

One of the main devices was horizontal composition. Figures were often arranged along a horizontal line, perspectival depth was suppressed and the composition was concentrated in the foreground, which gives the picture a poster-like, monumental quality. Contemporary critics noted that this resembled a film still: "the picture resembles a frame from a torn film, a scene from a novel with neither beginning nor end", the critic A. Yagodovskaya wrote in 1960.

Each painter had his own group of heroes: plasterers in Popkov, geologists in Nikonov, builders in Andronov, repairmen in Tahir Salahov, herdsmen in Kharis Yakupov. Painting of the 1930s and 1940s had shown such people at work, but the painters of the severe style more often showed them resting or lost in thought. They also liked to paint themselves and their friends as workers: Andronov's wife, the painter Natalya Yegorshina, posed for The Raftsmen.

== Spread beyond Moscow ==
The severe style began in Moscow, but similar painting appeared across the Soviet Union at about the same time. Kädi Talvoja writes that the earliest school seems to have formed in Latvia. An exhibition of thematic painting from the Baltic republics, held in Tallinn in 1959 together with a conference, helped spread the new direction to Estonia. In Azerbaijan Tahir Salahov was one of its leading figures. He depicted workers and industry in a gritty realist manner, and for one series he spent three months at Neft Daşları, the oil settlement built out at sea near Baku. In Ukraine Tetyana Yablonska worked in this manner in the 1960s and 1970s, and in Central Asia artists took up the style in the late 1960s and 1970s. In Estonia it is dated from 1957, the year of Leili Muuga's Sceptics, a painting regarded as an early sign of the new style, up to the 1970s.

== Artists ==
The painters usually associated with the movement include Nikolai Andronov, Andrey Vasnetsov, Viktor Ivanov, Izzat Klychev, Geliy Korzhev, Pavel Nikonov, Igor Obrosov, Pyotr Ossovsky, Viktor Popkov, Mikhail Savitsky, Tahir Salahov, Kharis Yakupov and the brothers Alexander and Pyotr Smolin. Outside Russia the style is also associated with Edgars Iltners in Latvia and Tetyana Yablonska in Ukraine.

== Reception ==
As early as 1969 Kamensky saw the movement as finished. The severe style, he wrote, "was only a transitional phenomenon". It lacked "breadth of philosophical outlook and spiritual richness", its notes of "emphatically prosaic perception of the world and sullen concentration" were becoming repetitive, and its directness had turned into mere bluntness. Yet when he looked at the "too beautiful and artistic canvases of the young", he admitted that he missed "the rye bread of the 'severe style'".

Alexey Bobrikov called the movement "an ethic of duty, responsibility and inner compulsion, opposed to an aesthetic of freedom". He compared it to a Soviet Reformation: people lived their values themselves instead of taking part in collective rituals. Talvoja, writing about Estonia, argues that the movement does not fit the usual division into official and unofficial art. In her view its painters helped to shape the values of the Khrushchev years instead of simply accepting or resisting them.

== See also ==
- Socialist realism
- Khrushchev Thaw
- Soviet nonconformist art
