= Ivan Korzhev =

Ivan Korzhev Honoured Artist of the Russian Federation
- Иван Коржев
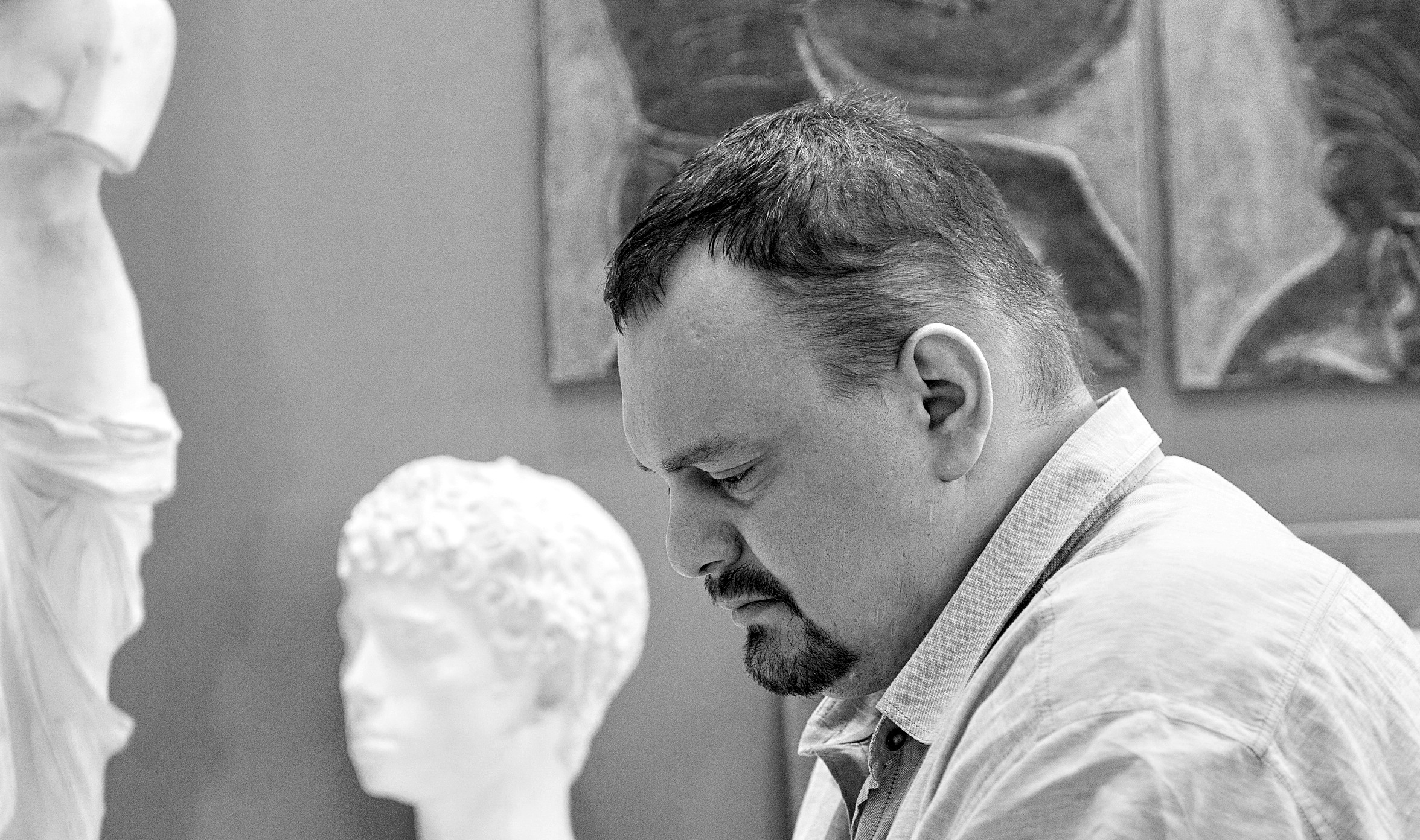
- Ivan Korzhev
- Born: Ivan Vladimirovich Korzhev-Chuvelev; 24 November 1973; Moscow, USSR
- Awards: Honoured Artist of the Russian Federation

Ivan Korzhev (Russian: Иван Коржев, born 24 November 1973) is a Russian artist specialising in sculpture and modern architecture. He was an author of numerous monumental, indoor, memorial, park sculpture artworks. He was also known for his architectural creations and was awarded in 2008 the title of Merited Artist of the Russian Federation.

== Family ==
Ivan Korzhev is Geliy Korzhev's grandson.
