= Izzat Klychev =

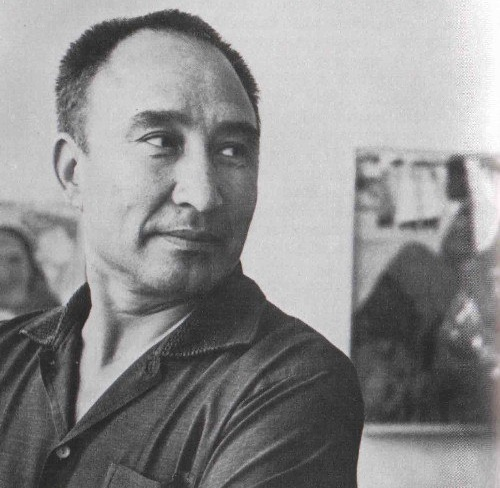
- Born: 10 October 1923; Yalkim village, Baýramaly Region, Turkestan ASSR, RSFSR, Soviet Union
- Died: 12 January 2006 (aged 82); Ashgabat, Turkmenistan
- Education: Repin Institute of Arts
- Movement: Socialist realism

Izzat Nazarovich Klychev (10 October 1923 – 12 January 2006) was a Soviet and Turkmen painter, incumbent member of the Academy of Arts of the USSR and honorary corresponding member of the Russian Academy of Arts.

== Biography ==
=== Early years ===
Klychev was born on October 10, 1923, in the village of Yalkim in the Bayram-Ali region of Turkmenistan.

Izzat's father Annaklych, a mullah, was an educated man and enlightened teacher who taught children a working model of the solar system with a rotation around the Earth and the moon. In 1933, ten-year-old Izzat was sent to exile from Turkmenistan to northern Kazakhstan, along with his family. Izzat's mother and father perished in the labor camp in front of his eyes.

His father, Annaklych Suvkhan Nazar, had graduated from a Muslim high school (known as amadrassa) in Bukhara, and became a school teacher, teaching Quran, arithmetics, geography, natural sciences and history.

In 1933, Annaklych and his wife became political prisoners and were sent to exile to the cold Kazakh prairies together with their younger son Izzat. Within a year, both Izzat's mother and father perished in the labor camp. By miracle, Izzat's elder brother Reshit found his orphaned brother and brought him back to Turkmenistan.

=== Teenage years and twenties ===
In 1938, Izzat Klychev became a pupil of a boarding school at the State Art College of Ashgabat, and then continued his education as a student of this institution (1942-1944). In his early years, Izzat's works demonstrate the influence of his teacher, Y.P. Daneshvar, a Russian artist and follower of A.A. Deyneka. His works of this period feature vivid pages of Turkmen pictorial art.

And then fate gave me a present… a friendship with my art teacher, Y.P. Daneshvar. Speaking more precisely, at the beginning it was more of a mothering, a tutorship, and only when I grew up Y.P. Daneshvar became a very close friend of mine.

In 1942, Izzat Klychev is called up to the Soviet Army in World War II as a field wireman. Awarded several orders and medals, Izzat Klychev celebrates the Victory Day of May 9, 1945, in Berlin, Germany.

In 1947, Izzat Klychev is accepted to the Leningrad Institute for Painting, Sculpture and Architecture. Among his professors are outstanding painters B.V. Johanson and I.A. Serebrianiy. At Johanson's studio, Izzat creates his graduation work known as "In the Karakum Desert", and then successfully defends it in 1953.

The topic of his graduation work was 'The Karakum Desert'. To accomplish his task Klychev went to work in a geodesic expedition as a simple worker in the Karakum Desert. He spent all summer under 50C degrees paving the road of the future Karakum Canal. Despite all difficulties, Izzat still found time and energy to make outlines and to sketch. A year later, his graduation work "The Karakum Desert" was exhibited at the All-Union Art Expedition in 1953.

=== Later years ===
In 1957, being a post-graduate student of A.M. Gerasimov's studio, Izzet works on the historical painting "For a Better Life" - the first monumental painting of the kind in Turkmen visual art. Both "In Karakum Desert" and "For a Better Life", created in the classic style of Russian realism, were highly praised by critics and captured the attention of Russian public at large.

By the early 1960s, Izzat Klychev is already considered one of outstanding Soviet artists of his era. More importantly, Izzat Klychev's works have formed development path for Turkmen visual art. Among the most known paintings of the artist - "Me and My Mother" (1964), "Shearmen" (1964), "Beluji" (1965), triptych "Day of Rejoicing" (1967), tondo "Happiness" (1979), "Autumn Song" (1982), and "Bride" (1996).

As written by the art historian of Central Asia, Margaret Halaminskaya, "the creative works of Turkmen artists have made a significant contribution to the formation of such a complex and at the same time whole artistic phenomenon like soviet paintings of 1960s. The high point of Turkmen art include the achievements of the People's Artist of Turkmen SSR Izzat Nazarovich Klychev, who has had an impact on all fine arts of Republic and especially on the generations of artists who started their profession during the same period".

A question about the essence of Klychev's innovation was successfully resolved, and in 1967 he was awarded the USSR State Prize for the series of works "My Turkmenia"

=== Family life ===
The professional success of Izzat Klychev was largely inspired by his happy personal life. His spouse, Ene, a connoisseur of popular art, had a rare talent in planning her every day life in a way to make sure that the atmosphere in their home was full of happiness and creativity, which was very important for Izzat Klychev. The most known paintings, dedicated to the close circle of Izzet Klychev are «Jeren» (1973), «A Girl with Cherries (Lyalya)» (1975), «Young mother» (1976), «Portrait of daughter Maral» (1976).

=== Charitable activities ===
Izzat Klychev combined numerous charitable activities with his creativity. He remained the head of Artists Union of Turkmenistan for many years, and his direct active participation in young Turkmen artists' lives formed several generations of creative authors, among those, an outstanding informal community of the 1970s called "The Seven", widely recognized in Moscow, Russia and abroad.

Since 1953, Klychev was a permanent participant of large all-Union, regional and international exhibitions. He also held a number of personal events in Moscow, Russia and Ashgabat, Turkmenistan, as well as in many foreign countries.

=== Death ===
The artist continued working up to the very last days of his life despite suffering from a long illness. His last monumental painting «Geoktepin battle» remains unfinished. He died on January 12, 2006.

== Creative period ==
=== Periods and styles ===
The 1960s is the time of Izzat Klycheva's formation and search for new ways in art. In 1967, the "Me and My Mother" and "My Turkmenia" painting series "Shearmen"(1964), "Desert" (1964), "Legend" (1964), "Beluji" (1965) were honored by receiving the USSR State Prize. Within the same period, Izzat Klychev was working on the «Day of Rejoicing» triptych – the first one in the history of Turkmen arts – that becomes a major occurrence in Soviet creativity. The artist demonstrates his new figurative language of open color, which consists of folklore traditions and "austere style" technique. This initiative becomes a basisin the further development of Turkmen visual art.

Izzat Klychev's art is modern, not only because he chooses his material from the daily life, but also because it is rich with the spirit of time which is interweaved with national and international breakings.

In the late 1960s to early 1970s, Izzat Klychev is especially prolific and this period is marked with the creation of the paintings «Tomorrow is a Holiday» (1972) and «Eastern Tune» (1976).During this period, Izzat Klycheva is rediscovering his beloved Turkmenistan, dedicating his talent to the portraits of ordinary people and cultural figures. The portraits of writer Berdy Kerbabayev (1969), Hydyr Deryayev (1977) and many others are unveiled during that time. Izzat Klychev's creative development features a special vision of Turkmen women, with his national women types gallery: «Mother» (1967), «Craftswomen» (1969), «Mother's Rejoice"(1967) «Young Turkmen girl» (1979), «Embroiderer» (1969), «Carpet maker» (1968), as well as widely known magnificent and inimitable images of women of Beluja - «Belujian» (1972), «Belujian Woman» (1971). One of the specialties of Izzat Klychev's style is the concordant apprehension of other cultures. Izzat Klychev travelled a lot and created several image series, which visualize the spirit and distinctiveness of the country of his visit and its people: Egypt (1966), Italy (1969, 1981), Cuba (1971), Bulgaria (1976), Ethiopia (1973), Angola (1978) are among some of his destinations which inspired series. In these works, Izzat Klychev demonstrates himself to be an outstanding landscape artist. Starting from tondo «Happiness» (1979), Izzat Klychev's works of the 1980s become cheerful, featured with intense colors, especially in term of contrast of deep red and orange tones.

Such an improvisational ornamental style in these paintings led the American painter Anton Refregier to express his thoughts in a letter to Izzat Klychev "I think in terms of your images and feelings you reveal the impressionist style"

See, for example, «For Wedding» (1979), «On the Start» (1980), «Dancing Africa» (1981), «Autumn Song» (1982). Izzat Klychev also pays a lot of attention to hedonistic still-life paintings: «Flower-piece with Venetian glass», «Autumn Flowers» (1981), «Still-life champagne» (all of 1980). At the same time, the artist is working on a ceramic panel design for the Turkmen National Circus.

A series of exquisite miniatures of the eastern tales and excellence in making sophisticated possession of ornament once again make us pay tribute to the traditions of the Turkmen culture that is manifested in a unique perfection of Tekin carpets, jewelry silver, and in rare aesthetic details of nomadic mode of life objects.

His artistic heritage is huge, it is priceless and will never disappear as it appears to be the most important contribution to both Turkmen and world art. Thistreasure will always demystify people to the world of beauty, foster a sense of love for the motherland, wake our desire to know the world better and preserve kind traditions and customs.

The initially scenic element of his works become stronger; Izzat Klycheva is fascinated with composition of ornamental patterns. Such masterpieces as «Bride» (1996), «Oriental market» (1996), and «Embroiderers» (1998). Klychev's graphic series inspired by Turkmen tales are known for their coloring and shapes. Within the last decade of his life, he threw himself into the work on such pieces as «Girls with Jugs», «My Village», «Melody of Karakum», «Horsemen». Within the last 3 years, most of his attention was paid to the historical painting, which illustrates a episode of Turkmen history – seizure of the Geoktepin fortress. The artist, who started his professional development from historical subjects, wanted to complete this work with a complex philosophic apologue. Even though the painting remains incomplete, it proves the development of Izzat Klychev's emotional and creative power, confirming the artistic maturity of the artists of Soviet and post-Soviet times.

== Public exhibitions and collections ==
- State Tretyakov Gallery, Moscow, Russia
- The State Museum of Oriental Art, Moscow, Russia
- Board of Exhibitions of the Artists' Union of the USSR, Moscow, Russia
- Foundation of Arts, Moscow, Russia
- Ministry of Culture, Moscow, Russia
- State Museum of Fine Arts of Turkmenistan, Ashgabat
- Board of Exhibitions of the Artists' Union of Turkmenistan, Ashgabat
- Magnitogorsk Art Gallery, Marnitogorsk, Russia
- Works of Izzat Klychev are also represented in many private collections around the world.

== Orders and medals for combat services ==
- Order of the Red Star
- Order of the Patriotic War 2nd degree
- Medal "For Courage"
- Medal "For the Liberation of Warsaw"
- Medal "For the Capture of Berlin"
- Medal "For the Victory over Germany in the Great Patriotic War 1941–1945"

== Titles and government awards ==
- 1955 Order of the Red Banner of Labour
- 1963 Honored Art Worker of the Turkmen SSR
- 1964 People's Painter of the Turkmen SSR
- 1967 USSR State Prize for 'My Turkmenia' painting series
- 1973 People's Painter of the USSR
- 1983 Hero of Socialist Labour
- 1983 Order of Lenin
- 2003 Order of Friendship - for significant contribution to progress and consolidation of Russian-Turkmen cooperation in cultural sphere
