= Sergey Vasilyevich Gerasimov =

Russian painter

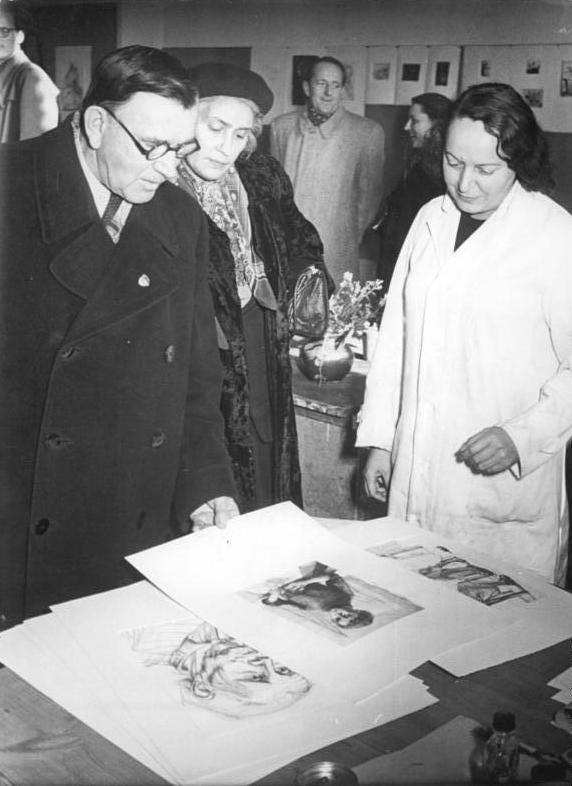

Sergey Vasilyevich Gerasimov (Russian: Серге́й Васи́льевич Гера́симов; 26 September [O.S. 14 September] 1885 – 20 April 1964) was a Soviet and Russian painter. First Secretary of the Union of Painters of the USSR in 1958-1964.

== Biography ==
In 1907-1912 studied at the Moscow School of Painting, Sculpture and Architecture where Gerasimov was a student of leading Russian Impressionist Konstantin Korovin, and as a young artist he later went on to join the Makovets group. His early watercolors are considered masterpieces and show a tendency toward modernism that is less pronounced in his later work. In the 1920s and 1930s, he taught at the state art school Vkhutemas, and designed posters and painted works sympathetic to the new Communist government in a style later known as Socialist realism.

Despite this he was known throughout the Russian art world to be a liberal thinker whose paintings showed the influences of Impressionism and other modern movements. Under Joseph Stalin these tendencies placed him in aesthetic opposition to his nemesis (and ironic namesake) Aleksandr Gerasimov - the latter in his capacity of the President of the Academy of Arts of the Soviet Union having once exclaimed heatedly: “I will send to swing at the gallows anyone who’d dare to exhibit Pablo Picasso in the USSR!”.

During the Stalin era, Sergey Gerasimov was demoted from his position of First Secretary of the Union of Painters of the USSR and replaced by Aleksandr Gerasimov. During the period of World War II, Sergey Gerasimov, along with most of the faculty and student body of the Surikov Art Institute were moved from Moscow to the ancient caravan city of Samarkand in 1941-1943.

Some of Gerasimov's most famous works were painted during this period and show scenes of the old oriental city of Samarkand. Many of these paintings are on display to this day at the Tretyakov Gallery in Moscow.

In 1943–1948 годах — director of the Moscow Surikov State Academic Institute of Fine Arts. During the Fight against Formalism in the Art of Soviet Russia in the 1940s, which evolved into campaign against the Impressionism, was fired from director’s post as former pupil of Impressionist and Parisian emigre Konstantin Korovin.

With the death of Stalin and the rise of Nikita Khrushchev, Sergey Gerasimov was re-instated as the head of the Russian Artists' Union, a position he held until his death in 1964.

Some of Gerasimov's most famous students that he came in contact with and taught at the Surikov Art Institute include; Fedor Z. Zakharov, Vladimir Stozharov, Alexey and Sergey Tkachyov, Yury P. Kugach, Aleksei Gritsai, Geliy Korzhev, and many other important Soviet artists.

== Selected works ==
The Peasant Uprising of 1860 (1951)
