= Moscow Surikov State Academic Institute of Fine Arts =

Art institute in Moscow, Russia

Moscow State Academic Art Institute named after V. I. Surikov
- Московский государственный академический художественный институт имени В. И. Сурикова
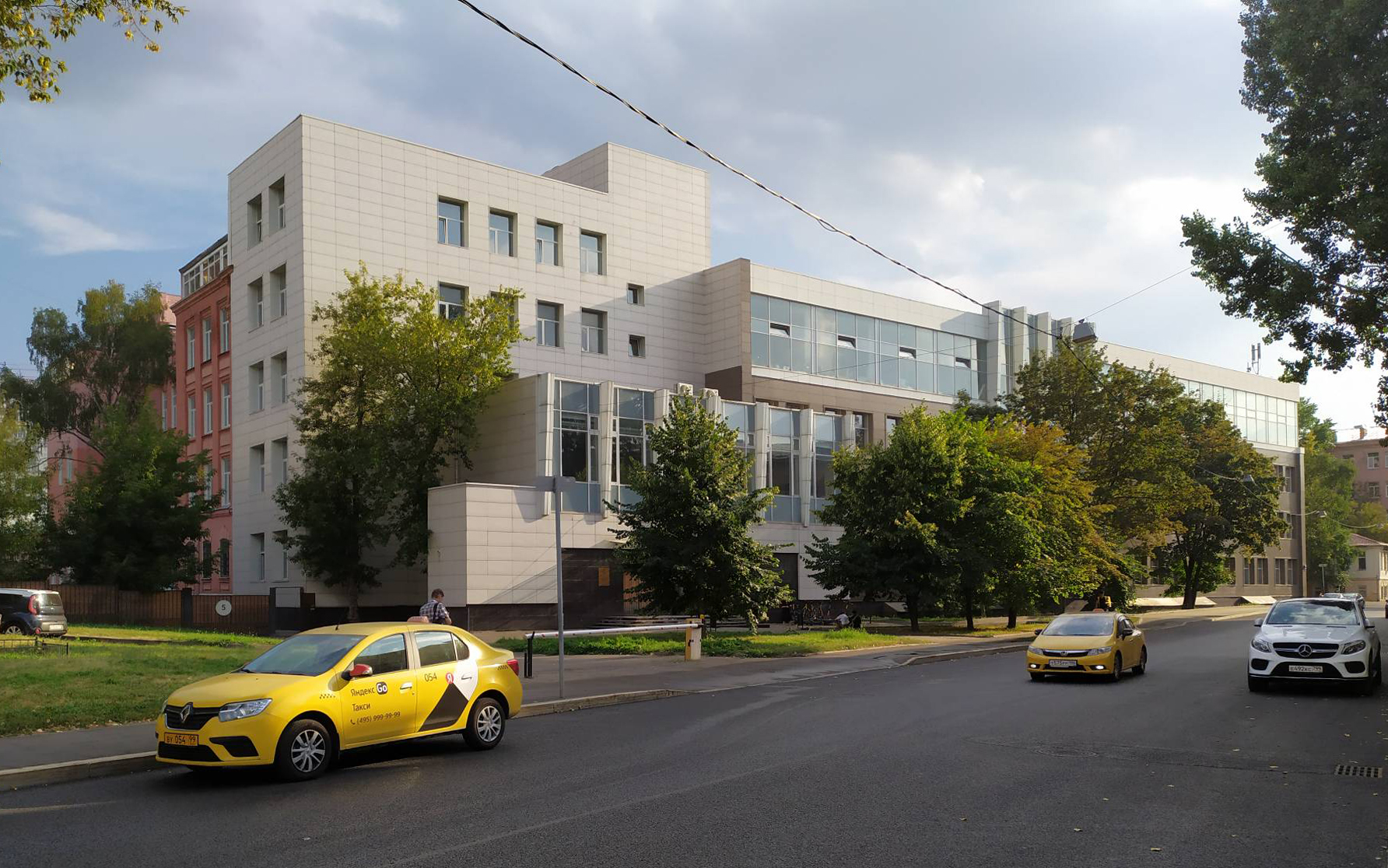
- Former names: Moscow Institute of Fine Arts (1934–1939); Moscow State Art Institute (1939–1948)
- Type: Public art school
- Established: 1939; 87 years ago (Note: The founding date is reported inconsistently: the institute's charter claims succession from the Moscow School of Painting, Sculpture and Architecture (1843); the school itself was created in 1934 as the Moscow Institute of Fine Arts; the name "Moscow State Art Institute" and its charter date from 1939, the year given here.)
- Affiliations: Russian Academy of Arts
- Rector: Anatoly Lyubavin
- Students: 811 (2026)
- Location: 30 Tovarishchesky Lane, Moscow, Russia; 55°44′37″N 37°39′59″E
- Campus: Urban
- Website: surikov-vuz.com

The Moscow Surikov State Academic Institute of Fine Arts, formally the Moscow State Academic Art Institute named after V. I. Surikov (Russian: Московский государственный академический художественный институт имени В. И. Сурикова) and commonly the Surikov Institute, is a Russian state art school in Moscow. Together with the Saint Petersburg Repin Academy of Arts it forms the educational structure of the Russian Academy of Arts.

The institute regards itself as the successor of the Moscow School of Painting, Sculpture and Architecture, founded in 1843 and reorganised after the October Revolution into the Free State Art Studios (Svomas), then Vkhutemas and Vkhutein. It was created in 1934 as the Moscow Institute of Fine Arts on the basis of the former graphic arts faculty of the Moscow Vkhutein, renamed the Moscow State Art Institute in 1939, and in 1948 given the name of the painter Vasily Surikov.

It trains painters, graphic artists, sculptors, architects, restorers and art historians. Training in the artistic specialities lasts six years and follows the academic tradition of drawing, painting and composition from life, with compulsory open-air and copying practice; students work in personal studios run by individual masters. More than six thousand specialists have graduated from it. In 1957 it was awarded the Order of the Red Banner of Labour.

== History ==
=== Predecessor: the Moscow School of Painting, Sculpture and Architecture ===
The institute's predecessor grew out of a drawing class organised in 1832 and turned in 1843 into a school under the Moscow Art Society, open to students of every social estate. In 1865 it merged with the Palace School of Architecture and took the name Moscow School of Painting, Sculpture and Architecture. Vasily Perov, Alexei Savrasov, Vasily Polenov, Valentin Serov, Konstantin Korovin and Isaac Levitan taught there.

=== Svomas, Vkhutemas and Vkhutein, 1918–1930 ===
After the October Revolution the school became the Second Free State Art Studios and the Stroganov School the First, the two together forming the Moscow Svomas, where Kazimir Malevich, Wassily Kandinsky, Pyotr Konchalovsky and Robert Falk taught. A decree of the Council of People's Commissars of 29 November 1920 merged the studios into Vkhutemas, with eight faculties. In 1926 (Note: Encyclopaedic works give 1926; the institute's own history and some studies of the Russian avant-garde give 1927.) Vkhutemas was reorganised into Vkhutein. Its printing faculty employed the leading masters of printmaking — Vladimir Favorsky, Pavel Pavlinov and Nikolai Kupreyanov — and carried the Vkhutemas tradition into the future institute.

=== Dissolution of Vkhutein and the graphic arts faculty, 1930–1934 ===
Vkhutein was dissolved on 30 March 1930. The stated reason was to stop training painters and sculptors on the traditional classical model and to produce instead designers useful at the plants of the first five-year plan and at mass demonstrations.

Its painting and sculpture faculties were abolished and their students transferred to Leningrad, where they were merged with the corresponding faculties of the Leningrad Vkhutein into the Institute of Proletarian Fine Arts under F. A. Maslov, an official of the Main Directorate of Vocational Education. Maslov set out to replace students of bourgeois origin with students of proletarian background, opening evening classes for workers whose graduates were admitted without examinations. Two years of this degraded the teaching so badly that in 1932 Maslov was dismissed, the institute abolished, and its premises passed to the Leningrad Institute of Painting, Sculpture and Architecture, today the Saint Petersburg Repin Academy of Arts.

Moscow was thus left without a fine art school. The only place where art could still be studied was the former graphic arts faculty of the Moscow Vkhutein under Favorsky, transferred in 1930 to the newly founded Moscow Polygraphic Institute with Nikolai Lapin as dean. Favorsky created a semi-official painting subsection inside it, which between 1930 and 1934 was the only place in Moscow where painting was taught. It was this faculty, and not those sent to Leningrad, that became the direct basis of the future institute.

=== Moscow Institute of Fine Arts, 1934–1939 ===
In 1934 the People's Commissariat for Education under Andrei Bubnov created a modestly sized Moscow Institute of Fine Arts on the basis of Favorsky's painting subsection. A decree of the Council of People's Commissars of 13 May 1934 established it with a single faculty, that of graphic arts; painting was added in 1935 and sculpture in 1936, some sculpture students returning from Leningrad. Its field station was at Kozy in Crimea. Igor Grabar, former director of the Tretyakov Gallery, became the institute's unofficial curator.

According to Yuri Golub and Dmitry Barinov, the Central Committee, campaigning since 1932 against "formalist" artists, sought to leave a single art school in the country and in 1934–1937 suppressed attempts to make the Moscow institute a fully fledged school on a par with Leningrad; it relented only in 1937, once Grabar and his colleagues had guaranteed that students would be trained according to the canons of socialist realism. Boris Ioganson, Sergey Gerasimov and Alexander Deyneka then joined Grabar as teachers.

=== Under Igor Grabar, 1937–1941 ===
Grabar took charge in 1937 and made the strengthening of professional skills, above all drawing, his main task. Considering the Petersburg school strongest in this respect, he invited teachers and graduates of the Leningrad Academy of Arts to Moscow, among them Dmitry Mochalsky in 1937. Summer plein-air practice was held at the Troitskoye estate in Kaluga Oblast and in Crimea, and composition was taught from the first year in close connection with painting and drawing.

A monumental studio headed by Deyneka appeared in 1938. By 1939 the system of personal studios that would shape the institute for decades had taken form: four easel studios under Sergey Gerasimov, Boris Ioganson (later Grigory Shegal), Georgy Ryazhsky and Grabar himself, with Nikolai Chernyshev invited into Deyneka's monumental studio. Sculpture was taught by Alexander Matveyev and Leonid Sherwood, poster design by Dmitry Moor. A decree of 9 August 1939 renamed the school the Moscow State Art Institute. (Note: The Moscow Encyclopaedic Reference (1992) dates this name to 1937.)

=== The Second World War, 1941–1945 ===
In the first days of the war the political directorate of the Moscow Military District found the art institute to be the only organisation in Moscow able to produce military posters; from July 1941 a brigade under Moor, Deyneka and Grigory Goroshchenko issued defence posters, printed by the institute itself.

The government decree on evacuation was issued on 12 October 1941. Eighteen professors and teachers — among them Alexander Osmerkin, Konchalovsky, Deyneka, Mochalsky, Pavlinov and Ivan Chekmazov — and forty-seven students stayed in Moscow and, despite repeated orders to evacuate, went on working as a "defence art brigade", producing posters and, on a commission from VOKS, a hand-made magazine in four languages for Soviet embassies. Classes never stopped, and in December 1942 the institute held its first Moscow graduation, chaired by Konchalovsky; the first graduation of sculptors was chaired by Vera Mukhina.

The first evacuation train left on 18 October 1941 and was joined on the way by the Kyiv and Kharkiv art institutes. In Samarkand the regional executive committee gave the institute ten premises, among them the Sherdar Madrasa and the Ulugh Beg Madrasa on the Registan; by December about three hundred people had gathered. Teaching resumed on 11 December under Gerasimov, Moor, Konstantin Istomin and Favorsky, and a poster brigade produced more than sixty sheets in Russian and Uzbek. In two years the institute graduated eighty-two artists, many of whom went on to work in Uzbekistan; an exhibition of their diploma works opened at the Pushkin Museum in May 1943.

The Samarkand group returned in December 1943. The institute still had no building of its own, and its faculties were scattered across Moscow: the graphic arts faculty and library in the former Moscow School building on Kirova Street, today Myasnitskaya Street; the administration and junior studios in the foyer of the Vakhtangov Theatre; the studios of Gerasimov, Deyneka and Pyotr Pokarzhevsky in Vsekhsvyatsky Lane; and the sculpture faculty in a one-storey building at 3 Frunze Street, today Znamenka Street. Conditions were severe: in 1943/44 no defence of diplomas could be held because the studios were barely heated, and Mikhail Alpatov, invited to head the chair of Russian art, read his course in a studio for want of lecture rooms. The search for permanent premises lasted thirteen years and ended in the late 1940s, when a decree of the Council of Ministers gave the institute a building at 30 Tovarishchesky Lane.

Of those who left for the front, the lists have not survived; a memorial plaque holds the names of nineteen of the fallen, among them Favorsky's sons Nikita and Ivan. Thirteen students and teachers died of disease during the evacuation, including Istomin in 1942. The sculptors Vladimir Tsigal and Lev Kerbel, later authors of the monuments to Soviet soldiers in Berlin, Küstrin and Seelow, served in the Black Sea Fleet and the Northern Fleet.

=== Within the USSR Academy of Arts, 1947–1991 ===
By a decree of 5 August 1947 the institute passed under the newly created USSR Academy of Arts, (Note: The Moscow Encyclopaedic Reference (1992) dates the transfer to 1964; the Russian Academy of Arts lists the institute among the schools that entered its structure at its foundation in 1947.) and a decree of 5 June 1948 gave it the name of Vasily Surikov.

The transfer coincided with the campaign against "formalism" and "rootless cosmopolitanism" and brought the dispersal of the teaching body. As the press historian Alexander Nesterov has shown, the campaign was waged less by the party leadership than by artists and critics associated with the Association of Artists of Revolutionary Russia; at the May 1948 session of the Academy of Arts the school's work was declared "formalist" and its reform announced. Gerasimov was removed and, with Deyneka, Grabar, Chernyshev, Matveyev and Osmerkin, left the institute; in all, twenty-eight professors were dismissed "for formalism". Erik Bulatov, who entered in 1948, recalled that "the artists who ran the Surikov Institute were all driven out, and others, far worse, were taken in their place". Fyodor Modorov became rector, and the severity of his rule gave the institute the word modorovshchina; Vasily Yefanov, Fyodor Reshetnikov, Yevgeny Kibrik, Nikolai Tomsky and Matvey Manizer joined the staff. Part of the institute moved to Tovarishchesky Lane in 1948 and it was fully installed there by 1950; the Crimean practice base was closed.

In 1956, during the Khrushchev Thaw, students voted at an open Komsomol meeting to remove the teachers who had arrived after 1948, but nothing came of the demands. Dmitry Mochalsky, one of the few prewar teachers to remain, ran his own studio from 1949 and headed the chair of painting from 1962 until his death in 1988; many future masters of the Severe style (суровый стиль), the current in Soviet painting that emerged during the Thaw, studied with him. The institute is connected with a key episode of the Thaw: the exhibition 30 Years of the Moscow Union of Artists at the Manege in 1962, denounced by Nikita Khrushchev, was prepared by Mochalsky, and among the works attacked was Geologists by the institute's graduate Pavel Nikonov.

The institute was headed by Alexander Myzin from 1962, by Tomsky from 1964, by Pavel Bondarenko from 1970 and by Lev Shepelev from 1988. Some personal studios have existed without a break since 1939: the monumental studio was led by Deyneka, who left in 1948 and returned in 1956, passed in 1967 to his pupil Klavdiya Tutevol and since 1990 has been run by Yevgeny Maximov. The theatre design studio was taken over in 1962 by Mikhail Kurilko-Ryumin, who led it for fifty years, and Tahir Salahov led an easel painting studio from 1974 to 1992. Ilya Glazunov taught from 1978 and led a portrait studio from 1979 until 1987, when he left to found the Russian Academy of Painting, Sculpture and Architecture, which received the Yushkov House on Myasnitskaya, the main building of the former Moscow School.

A chair of art history appeared in the second half of the 1930s under Grabar; Viktor Lazarev headed a chair of foreign art from 1943 and Alpatov the chair of Russian art, the two being merged in 1949. In the autumn of 1986 Alpatov handed the chair to Mikhail Kiselyov, and a government decree established a faculty of art theory and history.

=== Since 1992 ===
Since 1992 the institute has been under the Russian Academy of Arts, successor of the USSR Academy of Arts; the word "academic" was added to its name in the same year, and since 2015 the name also states the affiliation.

In 1992 Nikolai Andronov, one of the founders of the Severe style, opened an easel painting studio to which students were admitted in the first year rather than the third, and a chair of composition appeared with his arrival. After his death in 1998 the studio was led by Pavel Nikonov until 2006, then by Albina Akritas and by Yury Shishkov until 2020. Valentin Sidorov led a studio from 1998 and Tatyana Nazarenko from 1999 to 2016. Teachers and students of the institute painted the reconstructed Cathedral of Christ the Saviour and took part in the restoration of the churches of Optina Monastery.

The sculptor Anatoly Bichukov was rector from 2001 to 2011. Under him a faculty of architecture was created, with its first graduation in 2007, a joint studio opened in 2003 under Zurab Tsereteli and Salahov, a studio of easel painting restoration in 2004 and later a studio of battle painting; Aidan Salahova began teaching. Much of the period went on repairing the buildings, and in 2004 the institute received a restored building in Lavrushinsky Lane. The changes were assessed in different ways: a routine close to that of an office was introduced, with bells, attendance records and a ban on working in the studios after hours, and a plan was discussed to replace the personal studios with specialised ones. In 2006 Nikonov's contract was not renewed despite a collective letter from his students; he returned to teaching under the next rector.

The graphic artist Anatoly Lyubavin has been rector since 2011. In 2013 the faculty of art theory and history moved from the specialist programme to bachelor's and master's degrees, and since October 2020 the institute's teachers have taught art programmes for schoolchildren at the Sirius educational centre. In March 2024 the exhibition Graduation. History. Surikov Institute at Zaryadye Park showed more than two hundred works by teachers and students of different generations.

== Names ==
Years	Name
1832–1843	Life drawing class
1843–1865	School of Painting and Sculpture of the Moscow Art Society
1865–1918	Moscow School of Painting, Sculpture and Architecture
1918–1920	Second Free State Art Studios
1920–1926	Higher Art and Technical Studios (Vkhutemas)
1926–1930	Higher Art and Technical Institute (Vkhutein)
1930–1934	Publishing and graphic arts faculty of the Moscow Polygraphic Institute
1934–1939 (Note: The institute's own documents keep the name "Moscow Institute of Fine Arts" until the decree of 9 August 1939; the Moscow Encyclopaedic Reference dates the change to 1937, and the intermediate form "Moscow Art Institute" appears only in reference publications.)	Moscow Institute of Fine Arts
1939–1948	Moscow State Art Institute
1948–1957	Moscow State Art Institute named after V. I. Surikov
1957–1992	Moscow State Art Institute of the Order of the Red Banner of Labour named after V. I. Surikov
1992–2015	Moscow State Academic Art Institute named after V. I. Surikov
since 2015	Moscow State Academic Art Institute named after V. I. Surikov of the Russian Academy of Arts

== Locations ==
The institute had no building of its own until 1948, occupying premises inherited from its predecessors and scattered structures across Moscow:

- 1844–1940s — 21 Myasnitskaya Street, named Kirova Street between 1935 and 1990: the Moscow School of Painting, from 1918 the Second Free State Art Studios, Vkhutemas and Vkhutein, and from 1930 the publishing and graphic arts faculty of the Polygraphic Institute.
- 1918–1920 — 11 Rozhdestvenka Street: the First Free State Art Studios in the Stroganov School building.
- 1941–1943 — Samarkand: ten premises given to the evacuated part of the institute.
- 1941–1948 — Vsekhsvyatsky Lane: the personal studios of the painting faculty; Vakhtangov Street, today Bolshoy Nikolopeskovsky Lane, and Sobachya Ploshchadka, demolished in 1962: the administration and the junior studios; 3 Frunze Street, today Znamenka Street: the sculpture faculty.
- since 1948 — 30 Tovarishchesky Lane: the main building.

The building at 15 Lavrushinsky Lane, opposite the Tretyakov Gallery, housed the Moscow Secondary Art School until the 1980s and opened as a building of the institute after restoration in 2004. Teaching is now carried on at both addresses: the rector's office and the faculties of painting, sculpture, architecture and art theory and history are at 30 Tovarishchesky Lane in the Tagansky District, the graphic arts faculty at 15 Lavrushinsky Lane. The institute has a dormitory of 5,500 square metres.

== Academics ==
Admission is to six-year specialist programmes in painting, graphic arts and sculpture, to bachelor's and master's programmes in art theory and history, and to a bachelor's programme in architecture; besides the Unified State Exam, applicants sit entrance examinations in drawing, in painting or sculpture, and a colloquium. In June 2026 the institute had 811 students, 497 of them state-funded.

Teaching rests on personal studios: as a rule students take a specialisation after two foundation years and work in a studio from the third year to the sixth, though in the sculpture faculty and in some studios admission is from the first year. Summer plein-air practice and copying practice in museums are compulsory; practical training is carried out at more than forty museums and organisations. The diploma work is made in the sixth year and remains the property of the institute.

== Faculties ==
Data on deans and chairs follow the institute's website as of 2026.

- Painting — the largest faculty; dean Yulia Smirnova, chair headed by Yevgeny Maximov. Several easel painting studios work alongside studios of monumental art, theatre design, battle painting and easel painting restoration.
- Graphic arts — dean Yevgenia Voronova, chair headed by Matvey Shabayev; housed in Lavrushinsky Lane. Three creative studios — easel graphics, graphic art and poster, and book art — are supplemented by special studios of lithography, etching and linocut.
- Sculpture — dean Yevgeny Teterin, chair headed by Aleksandr Rukavishnikov; admission is up to eight state-funded students a year, who work in two personal studios.
- Architecture — founded in 2001; dean Yelena Kuznetsova, chair headed by Yekaterina Tribelskaya, with twenty-two teachers.
- Art theory and history — founded in 1986; dean Olga Proshkina, chair headed by Pavel Pavlinov. The specialist programme was replaced by bachelor's and master's degrees in 2013; there are also a correspondence department, a postgraduate school and a dissertation council.

Besides the faculty chairs there are chairs of drawing, of languages, of the humanities and of physical education; the library holds about 150,000 items.

The institute also runs pre-university preparatory departments, including one for foreign students, continuing professional education with retraining in painting, and the White Square prototyping centre, an open workshop with ceramic, carpentry and screen-printing sections.

== International relations ==
Foreign students have studied at the institute since the Soviet period, among them citizens of Bulgaria, Hungary, Germany, Greece, Cyprus, Egypt, Turkey, China and North Korea. The Berlin University of the Arts lists the Surikov Institute among its partner institutions in fine arts. In the 2010s and 2020s China became the principal direction of cooperation, with more than ten agreements signed, among them with the China Academy of Art and the Hubei Institute of Fine Arts; other partners include the Belarusian State Academy of Arts and universities in Uzbekistan.

== Research and publishing ==
The institute carries out research and issues teaching manuals on drawing and composition, studies of its own history, proceedings of the chair of art theory and history and of the annual conferences of the faculty of architecture, and catalogues of student and diploma exhibitions. Among them is Sergey Sirenko's monograph on the Crimean plein airs of 1935–1948.

== Rectors ==
Until 1943 the heads of the institute were styled directors.

- Nikolai Lapin (1934–1937)
- Igor Grabar (1937–1943)
- Sergey Gerasimov (1943–1948)
- Fyodor Modorov (1948–1962)
- Alexander Myzin (1962–1964) (Note: Myzin is usually omitted from lists of the institute's heads; some publications name Tomsky as rector from 1963.)
- Nikolai Tomsky (1964–1970)
- Pavel Bondarenko (1970–1988)
- Lev Shepelev (1988–2001)
- Anatoly Bichukov (2001–2011)
- Anatoly Lyubavin (since 2011)

== Notable teachers ==
The character of the institute as a school was set by Grabar, Gerasimov, Deyneka, Favorsky and Matveyev. In the postwar decades the sculptors Manizer, Tomsky and Kerbel taught there, the graphic artists Boris Dekhterev, Mikhail Cheremnykh and Kibrik, and the painters Mochalsky and Konstantin Maximov; art history was read by Lazarev, Yuri Kolpinsky and Alpatov. In 2007 the staff included twenty full members and eight corresponding members of the Russian Academy of Arts, twenty-one People's Artists of Russia and thirty-nine professors. Artistic dynasties are a characteristic feature of the institute: the Manizer, Pereyaslavets, Rukavishnikov, Gorsky-Chernyshev and Mochalsky families.

== Notable alumni ==
The graduations of the 1950s produced the generation that largely defined the Severe style: Geliy Korzhev and Pyotr Ossovsky graduated in 1950, Dmitry Zhilinsky and Boris Nemensky in 1951, Nikolai Andronov and Valentin Sidorov in 1954, Pavel Nikonov in 1956, Tahir Salahov in 1957 and Viktor Popkov in 1958. The graphic studios produced Ilya Kabakov, Erik Bulatov and Oleg Vasilyev, later key figures of Moscow Conceptualism. Other graduates include Lev Kerbel, Oleg Komov, Vyacheslav Klykov, Tatyana Nazarenko, Natalya Nesterova and Vladimir Dubossarsky; the sculptor Ernst Neizvestny graduated in 1954 from Matvey Manizer's studio.

== See also ==
- Moscow School of Painting, Sculpture and Architecture
- Vkhutemas
- Russian Academy of Arts
- Saint Petersburg Repin Academy of Arts
