= Tatyana Nazarenko =

Russian painter

Professor Tatyana Grigorievna Nazarenko (Russian: Татьяна Григорьевна Назаренко, born 24 June 1944) is one of the leading Russian contemporary painters. She was born in Moscow where she still lives and works.

== About her work ==
Her early works "Execution of the Narodniks" (320x325 cm, 1972, Collection of the Russian Museum St. Petersburg; “Decembrists. Uprising of the Chernigov regiment” (160x180 cm, 1978, Collection State Tretyakov Gallery, Moscow; “Partisans have come" (160x120 cm, 1975, Collection State Tretyakov Gallery); "Moscow Evening" (160x180 cm, 1978, Collection State Tretyakov Gallery) and "Pugachof" (180x300 cm, 1980, Collection of the Museum Arbat-Prestige, Moscow) gained her recognition for innovative reflection of present reality in contemporary painting.

She later moved on to reflect the political changes and economic impact thereof in her exhibition "Transition", an installation of over 120 life-size figures (exhibition in 1996 in the Central House of Artists, Moscow).

She is an artist who continues to search for new ways to reflect the changing world around her, and who regularly surprises her spectators with new techniques such as the installation "Transition"; or in 2004 an exhibition featuring sculptured full-size figures along with traditional painting in the Tretyakov Gallery in Moscow; in 2006 a large installation "Explosion" using full-size polyurethane foam figures at the "Vanishing Reality" exhibition in the Russian Museum in St. Petersburg (in the, exhibition visitor's album it was written that "children should not be allowed to see this nightmare" and "an exhibition for schizophrenics" which provoked the artist's comment that she is only reflecting the world around her), while in adjoining halls a selection of her career's works was on show; and in 2008 a video-art project. Meanwhile, she continues painting on canvas in a distinct and recognizable manner.

Olga Thomson says of her: "Scandalous and provocative as her latest works are, they testify to the feeling of tragedy that haunts the artist living in today’s world."

== Credentials ==
- Member of the Presidium of the Russian Academy of Arts
- Professor with responsibility for a painting workshop at the Surikov Institute in Moscow
- Was awarded several Government and Academic Awards
- Received the Independent Triumph Award for 2008 for her contribution to Art and Culture.
