= Yuri Pimenov =

Yuri Pimenov may refer to:

- Yuriy Pimenov (1958–2019), Russian rower
- Yuri Pimenov (painter) (1903–1977), Russian painter
