= Andrey Vasnetsov =

- Born: Andrey Vladimirovich Vasnetsov; February 24, 1924; Moscow, Soviet Union
- Died: 6 December 2009 (aged 85); Moscow, Russia
- Known for: Painting, Monumental art
- Notable work: Mosaics "Man and Press" (1979), high relief "Triumphing Glories" (1972)
- Movement: Severe Style (pioneer)
- Spouse: Irina Ivanovna Vasnetsova (Anisimova) (1927–2014)
- Awards: People's Artist of the USSR (1991); USSR State Prize (1979); Order of the Patriotic War 2nd class

Andrey Vladimirovich Vasnetsov (Russian: Андре́й Влади́мирович Васнецо́в; 24 February 1924 – 6 December 2009) was a Soviet and Russian painter and art educator. He was an important figure in the Moscow art scene of the post-Stalin era and one of the founders of the Severe Style (Russian: surovy stil), a major current in Soviet art from the late 1950s. In 1962 his painting Breakfast was among the works denounced by Soviet leader Nikita Khrushchev during his visit to the "30 Years of the Moscow Union of Artists" exhibition at the Moscow Manege. The episode limited Vasnetsov's exhibitions of easel painting for years afterward and redirected his career toward monumental art. He was the grandson of the famous painter Viktor Vasnetsov.

He was a corresponding member of the USSR Academy of Arts from 1988 and a full member of the Russian Academy of Arts from 1991. He was named a People's Artist of the USSR in 1991 and was a recipient of the USSR State Prize in 1979, the Lenin Komsomol Prize in 1972, and the Russian Federation Presidential Prize in Literature and Art (1999).

== Biography ==
Vasnetsov began studying art in a studio as a child, continuing his training at the Moscow Pioneer Palace.

During World War II, he was drafted into the Red Army. From November 1942, he served in combat units of the 48th Army on the Bryansk Front, beginning as a private and rising to sergeant and Komsomol organiser of his battalion. He fought his way from Oryol through Kursk to Königsberg (now Kaliningrad), and was decorated with an order and medals. In 1943, while at the front, he was assigned to produce propaganda posters and had to improvise his own materials — paint mixed from kerosene and scavenged pigments, brushes made from horsehair — an experience he later called a formative lesson in understanding materials as an element of artistic form. In August 1945, after the war, he was gathered with other artist-soldiers in Gumbinnen, in what had then been East Prussia, into a special unit created to produce the exhibition "Combat Path of the 3rd Belarusian Front," under the direction of the well-known Moscow artist Andrey Dmitrievich Goncharov.

Demobilised in 1946, he entered the Faculty of Monumental Painting at the Moscow Institute of Applied and Decorative Arts, where his teachers included Goncharov — under whose direction he had served in the 1945 exhibition brigade — as well as Alexander Deyneka and P. P. Sokolov-Skalya. In 1953, he graduated with honours from the Mukhina Higher School of Art and Industry in Leningrad. During these student years he also joined the Communist Party of the Soviet Union (then known as the VKP(b)), in 1948.

On 1 December 1962, at the exhibition "30 Years of the Moscow Union of Artists" at the Moscow Manege, Vasnetsov showed the paintings Breakfast, Conversation and Hanging Laundry. During his visit to the show — later remembered as the Manege Affair — Soviet leader Nikita Khrushchev singled out Breakfast for criticism. He reportedly demanded to know why the plate placed before the young man in the picture was empty, and whether the artist meant to suggest there was nothing to eat in the country. Vasnetsov maintained that the empty plate was included purely for compositional reasons, later recalling: "I simply needed a hollow there." In the aftermath, Vasnetsov published the article "Young Artists Serve the People" in Pravda on 14 January 1963, defending artists' right to formal innovation while affirming his own respect for artistic tradition. He was not expelled from the Union of Artists, but he was largely excluded from further exhibitions of his easel painting for some years afterward, and turned increasingly to monumental art, a field in which he had won wide recognition by the second half of the 1960s. For many years afterwards he showed his easel paintings to almost no one, keeping them a private, separate part of his practice.

From 1975, he taught at the Moscow Polygraphic Institute, where in 1980 he became the head of the Department of Drawing, Painting, and Composition. He was made a professor of this institute in 1986.

He was a member of the Union of Artists starting in 1956. From 1983, he served as the Secretary of the Board, and from 1988 to 1992, he was its Chairman. In 1989, during this same period, he was also elected a deputy to the 1st Congress of People's Deputies of the USSR.

His election as a full member of the Russian Academy of Arts in 1991 was followed, from 1997, by a seat on its Presidium. He was also the honorary chairman of the Vasnetsov Foundation, established by the family in 1992 to preserve its cultural legacy.

== Private life ==
Andrey Vasnetsov was born into a family of artists. His grandfather was Viktor Vasnetsov, a famous Russian painter and a master of historical and folklore subjects. His great-uncle Apollinary Vasnetsov was a Russian painter, a master of historical painting, and an art historian. His father, Vladimir Viktorovich Vasnetsov (1889–1953), was an ichthyologist and professor at Moscow State University, where he helped found and long headed the department of ichthyology, and a Stalin Prize laureate (1950).

Mother: Nadezhda Petrovna (1886–1951), schoolteacher.

Brother: Yuri, died in 1941 during the defence of Kalinin.

Wife: Irina Ivanovna Vasnetsova (Anisimova) (1927–2014), also an artist (sculpture and portraiture), member of the Union of Artists from 1959, and recipient of the Lenin Komsomol Prize.

Son: Fyodor Andreyevich Vasnetsov (1959–1996), artist, member of the Union of Artists from 1989.

He died on 6 December 2009 in Moscow at the age of 85 after a long illness. He was buried at the Vvedenskoye Cemetery, in the family plot (section 18) where his grandfather Viktor Vasnetsov also rests.

== Creative work ==
Over half a century of creative work, Vasnetsov created hundreds of canvases, including:

- The Ivanushkin Family (Big Dinner) (1953–1956)
- Woman in a Kerchief (Aunt Masha) (1956)
- Washing (1956–1984)
- Breakfast (1960)
- Hanging Laundry (1960)
- Conversation (1961)
- Peeling Potatoes (1963)
- Returning from the Hunt (1985)
- Family Dinner (1986)

He also supervised the restoration work on the Varvara Church in Tolyatti.

=== Artistic style ===
Vasnetsov's mature painting is built on a deliberately restricted, predominantly dark palette — black, brown, cold blue and grey, set off by ochre, brick-red or crimson — combined with flattened silhouettes and a strong sense of spatial construction. For his 1953 diploma work he painted a reminiscence of Gustave Courbet's A Burial at Ornans, which was not passed at his diploma defence. This style became fully evident two years later in Still Life with a Black Hen (1955), an almost monochrome study that unsettled contemporaries; some read it as a veiled comment on Soviet life. Vasnetsov denied any such intent, saying simply, "it is just a black hen: black on black." He explained the limited palette as the solution best suited to building "object-and-silhouette space", adding, "I am not against colour; I am against colour disturbing the precision of the feeling being conveyed," and described artistic completeness as a state "when little has been done but much has been said."

He acknowledged the influence of Vkhutemas and its circle — Vladimir Favorsky, Konstantin Istomin and Robert Falk — as well as of Italian Neorealist cinema and painters such as Giorgio Morandi, Renato Guttuso and Giuseppe Zigaina. Among the Old Masters, he named Francisco de Zurbarán, El Greco and Caravaggio as closest to him, and made free copies after works by each. The art historian Alexander Morozov linked Vasnetsov's early black-and-white canvases to existentialist philosophy, calling them expressions of "the dramatic essence of the existence of the lyrical hero, an ordinary individual," while cautioning that the artist never "revelled in gloom and obscurity" — pointing to warmly coloured works such as Aunt Masha and Portrait of a Woman (1957) as evidence of "a remarkable warm glow" beneath the austerity. Morozov considered the late Eclipse (2003), painted in memory of the artist's son, a kind of final statement, likening its mood of historical foreboding to Isaac Levitan's Over Eternal Peace.

== Collections ==
His works are held in many museums around the world, including the Tretyakov Gallery, the Russian Museum, and the Abramtsevo State Museum Reserve.

== Monumental art ==
The artist's monumental works can be seen in many cities across Russia and abroad, including:

- Panel "Golden Moscow" (co-authored with A. Goncharov and V. Elkonin, 1958).
- Mosaic "Conquerors of Space" in the vestibule of the Konstantin E. Tsiolkovsky State Museum of the History of Cosmonautics, Kaluga (1966).
- Mosaic "Conquest of October" on the facade of the "October" cinema-concert hall, Moscow, approximately 2,000 m² (1967, co-authored with Nikolai Andronov and V. Elkonin).
- Sculptural composition "The Muses" on the facade of the Tula Regional Drama Theater (co-authored with I. Vasnetsova and D. Shakhovsky, 1970).
- Decorative lanterns on the pilasters of the facade of the M. Gorky Moscow Art Theater (1973).
- Sculptural composition "History of Transport" in Tolyatti (1977).
- Interiors of the Russian Restaurant at the International Trade Center (1980).
- Mosaics "History of Domestic Weapons" in the lobby of the Ministry of Defence administrative building in Moscow (1985).

== Awards and honours ==
=== Titles and academic positions ===
- Honored Artist of the RSFSR (1977)
- People's Artist of the RSFSR (1984)
- People's Artist of the USSR (1991)
- Corresponding Member of the USSR Academy of Arts (1988); full member of the Russian Academy of Arts (1991)

=== Awards ===
- USSR State Prize (1979) – for the mosaic "Man and Press" in the building of the Izvestia newspaper editorial office.
- Lenin Komsomol Prize (1972) – for the high-relief "Triumphing Glories" on the facade of the Museum of Komsomol Combat Glory in Velikiye Luki.
- Prize of the Council of Ministers of the USSR (1984) – for the artistic design of the Tuvan ASSR State Musical Drama Theater (1985).
- Russian Federation Presidential Prize in Literature and Art (1999).

=== Orders and medals ===
- Order of the Patriotic War 2nd class
- Order of Friendship of Peoples (6 May 1994) – for a great contribution to the development of fine arts, fruitful pedagogical activity, and strengthening international cultural ties.
- Order of the Badge of Honour
- Medal "For Battle Merit"
- Medal "For the Victory over Germany in the Great Patriotic War 1941–1945"
- Medal "For the Capture of Königsberg"
- Jubilee medals for victory and service anniversaries.
- Gold Medal of the Russian Academy of Arts (2000).

== Personal exhibitions ==
He began exhibiting at youth exhibitions on Kuznetsky Most in 1954. He repeatedly participated in all-Union, republican, zonal, Moscow, and international exhibitions (in Germany, Bulgaria, Japan, the USA, and others). He returned to showing his easel painting publicly only in 1987, with nine works — including Self-Portrait with Family (1987) — at a group exhibition in Moscow.

In 2004 the Tretyakov Gallery held the retrospective "Andrei Vasnetsov: Painting of the 1950s–2004". His birth centenary in 2024–2025 was marked by several further exhibitions. These included "The Metaphysics of Being" at the State Pushkin Museum, "The Vasnetsovs. Connection of Generations" at the Tretyakov Gallery (through 4 November 2024), and a dedicated show at the Russian Museum in Saint Petersburg. Another retrospective, "Spaces of Andrei Vasnetsov", was held at the Russian Academy of Arts's Zurab Tsereteli Art Gallery (December 2024 – March 2025), accompanied by a catalogue and a documentary film about his monumental work.

== Bibliography ==
- Bazazyants, S. B. (1989). A. Vasnetsov. Moscow: Soviet Artist. (Masters of Soviet Art series).
- Andrey Vasnetsov: Drawings, Painting. Album-Catalog. (2005). Moscow.
- Ashkerov, A. Yu. (2006). Andrey Vasnetsov. I Portrait the Space. Exhibition: Catalog of Works from the Author's Personal Fund. Moscow: Russian Academy of Arts.
- Morozov, A. I. (2016). Andrey Vasnetsov. The Everydayness of Being. Moscow: International Confederation of Artists' Unions.
- Dubov, A. I. (2016). "The Austere Style of Andrey Vasnetsov". Problems of History, Philology, Culture, (2), 389–400.
- Morozov, A. (2024) [2005]. "Contemporary Artist Andrei Vasnetsov". The Tretyakov Gallery Magazine, 1 (82).
