= Geliy Korzhev =

Russian artist (1925–2012)

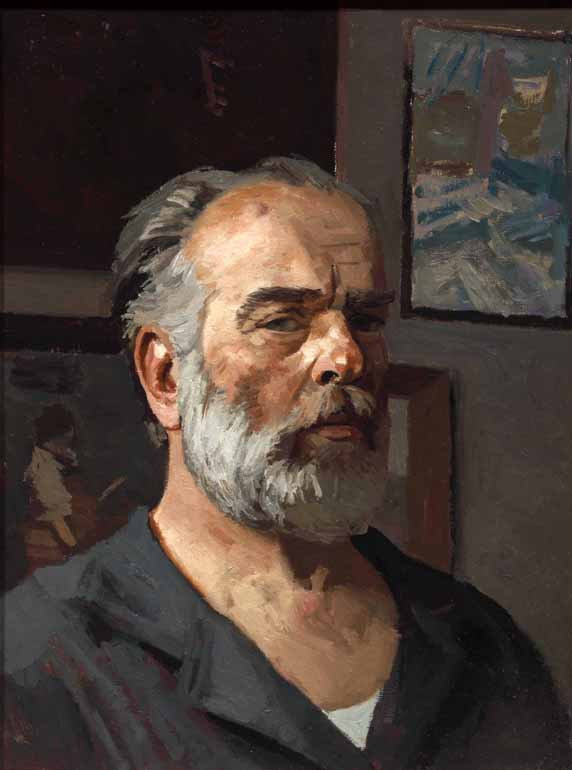
Self-portrait (1980)

Geliy Mikhailovich Korzhev-Chuvelyov (Russian: Гелий Михайлович Коржев-Чувелёв; 7 July 1925 – 27 August 2012) was a Soviet and Russian painter.

== Life ==
He studied at Moscow State Art School from 1939 to 1944 under Vasily Pochitalov, Mikhail Dobroserdov, and Mikhail Barshch. From 1944 to 1950 he studied at the Moscow State Art Institute under Sergey Gerasimov and Vasily Pochitalov. A painter in Soviet approved style of socialist realism, he continued to be active after the dissolution of the Soviet Union and remained a supporter of Communism.

== Politics ==
Unwavering in his political views, in the late 1990s the artist refused a state award bestowed upon him by the government of the Russian Federation, and Korzhev wrote of his motives:

I was born in the Soviet Union and sincerely believed in the ideas and ideals of the time. Today, they are considered a historical mistake. Now Russia has a social system directly opposite to the one under which I, as an artist, was brought up. The acceptance of a state award would be equal to a confession of my hypocrisy throughout my artistic career. I request that you consider my refusal with due understanding.

== Death ==
He died on August 27, 2012. He was buried at Alekseyevskoye Cemetery in Moscow. The monument on the grave was made by grandson Ivan under the sketches of the artist himself.

== Gallery ==
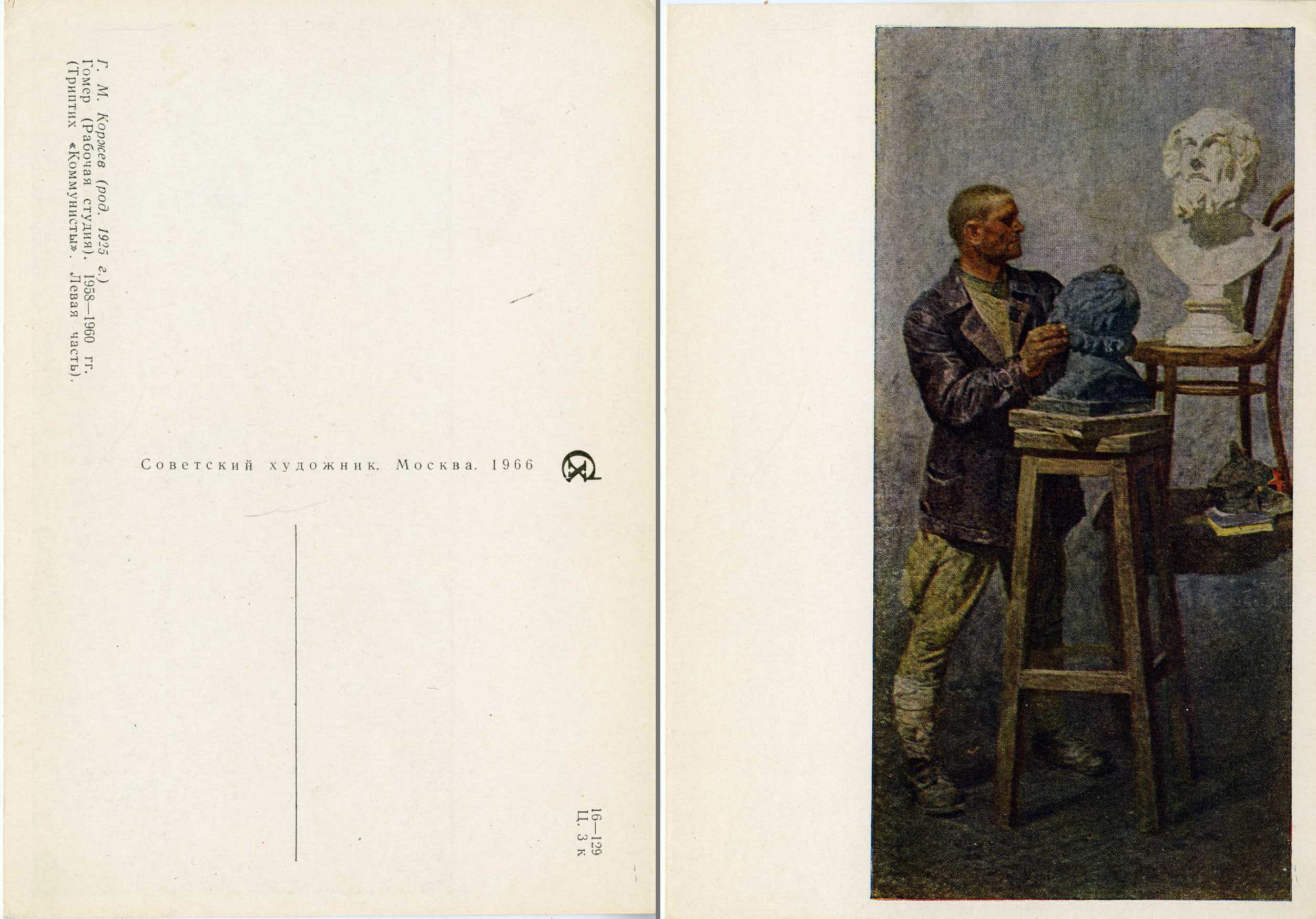
Homer - the left part of the triptych "The Communists"

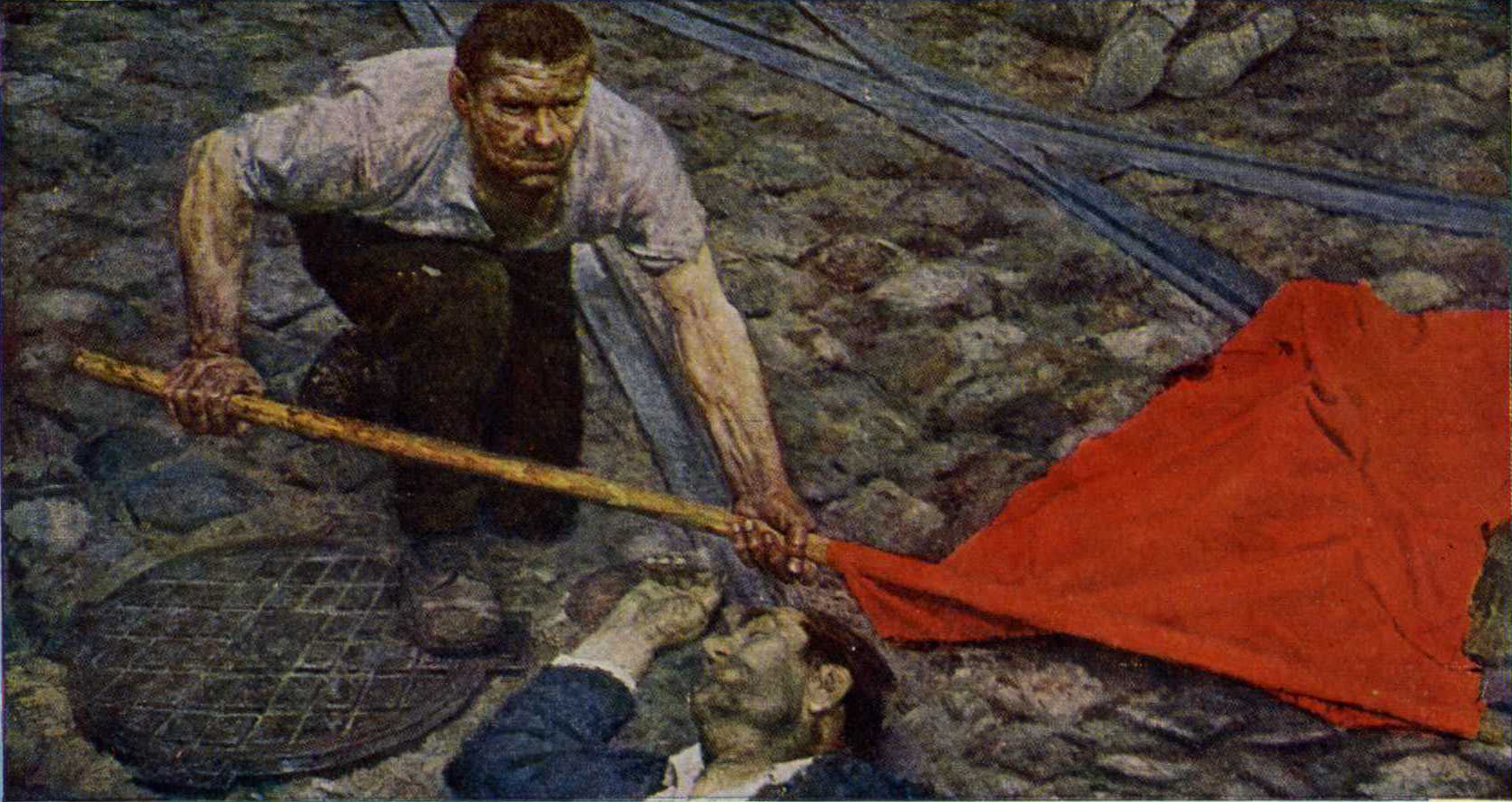
Raising the banner - the central part of the triptych "The Communists"

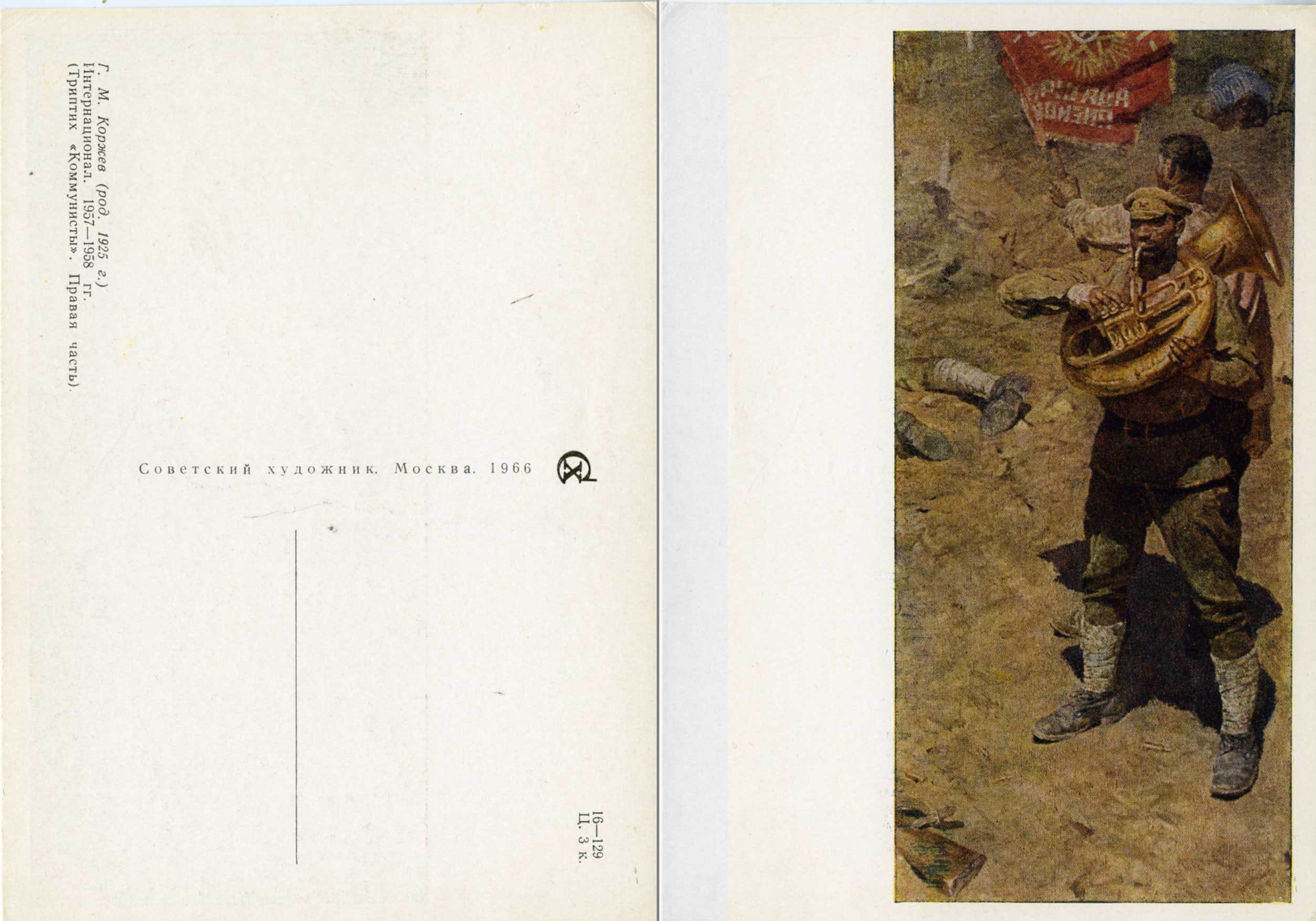
International - the right part of the triptych "The Communists"

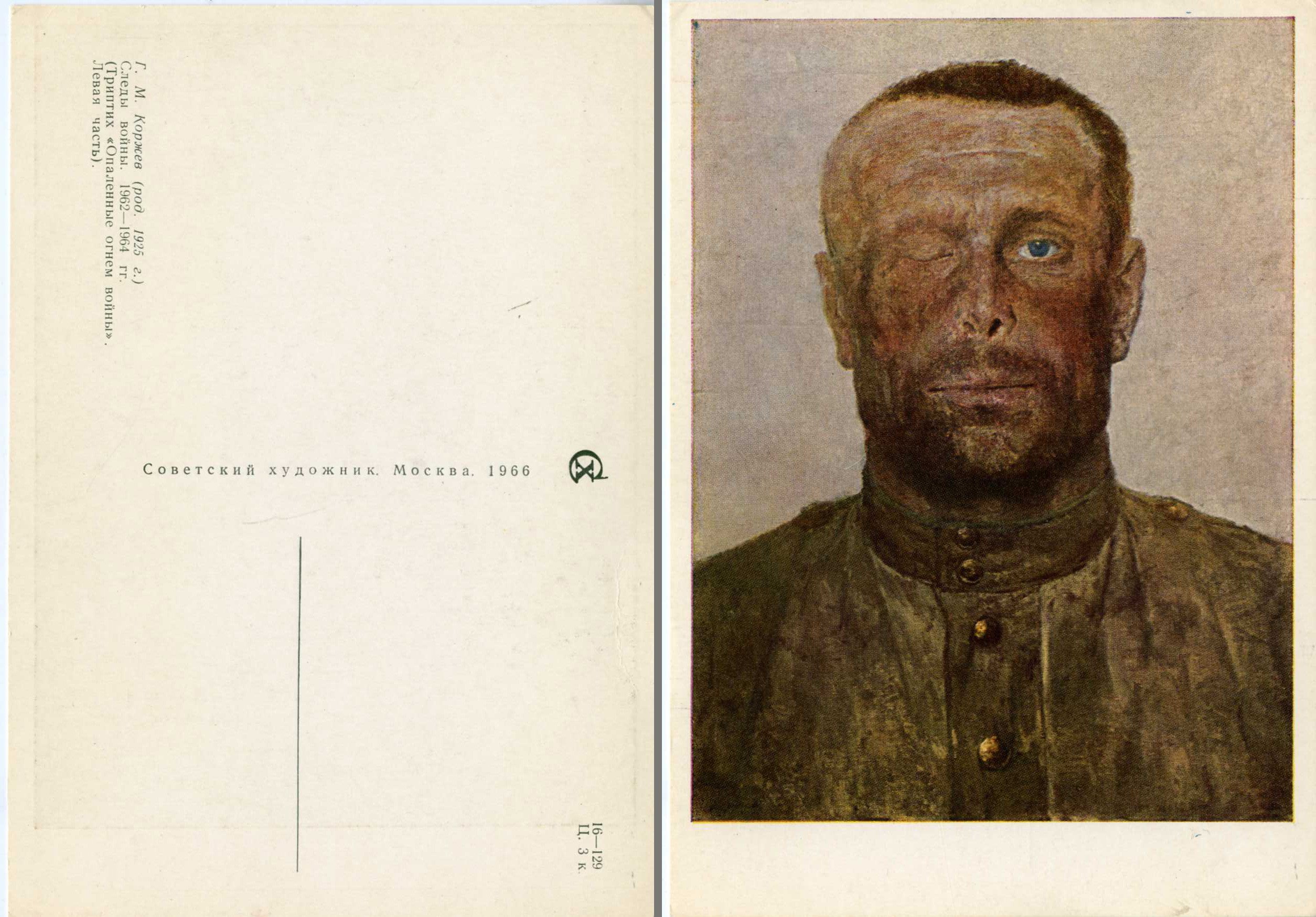
Traces of war

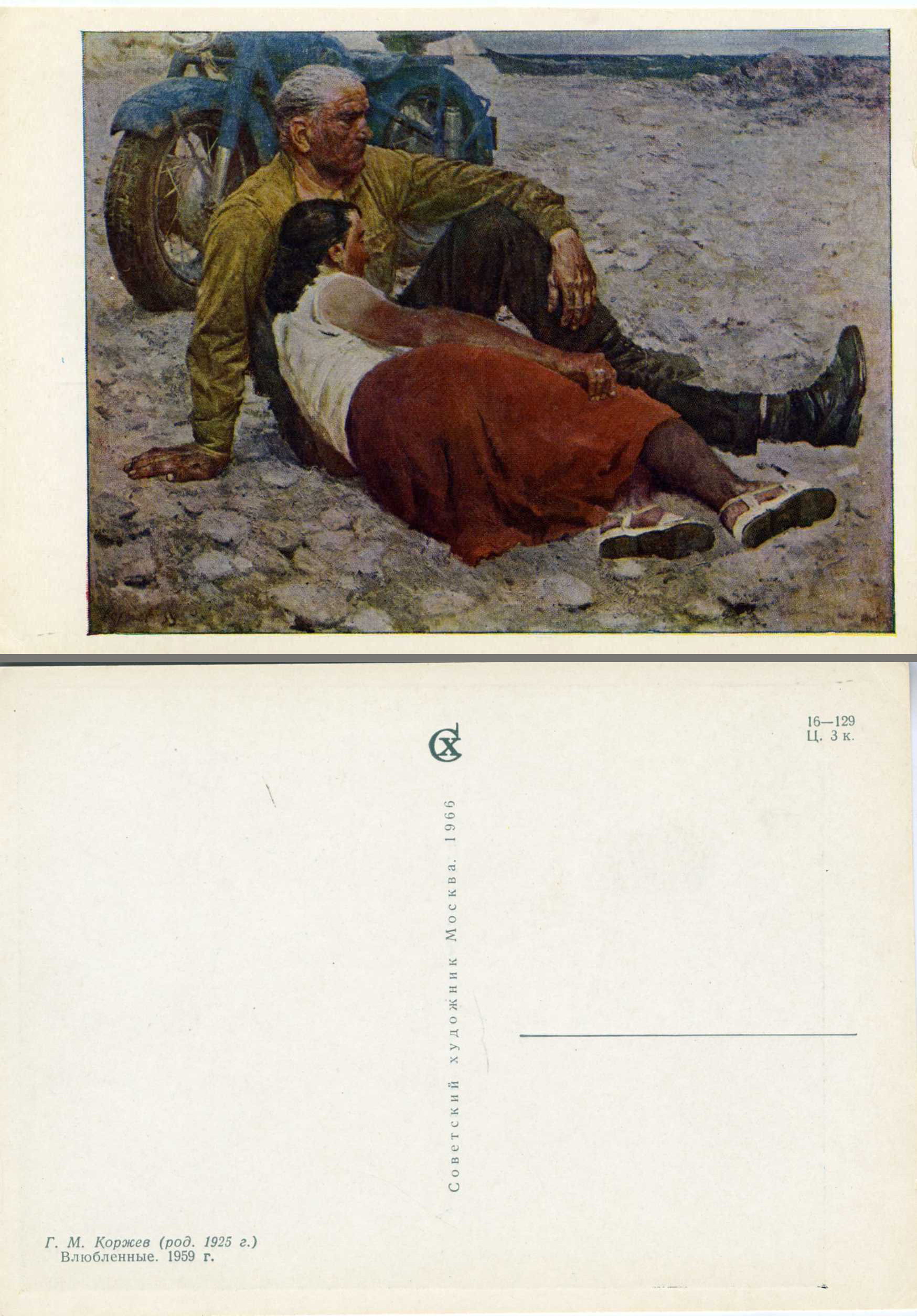
Lovers

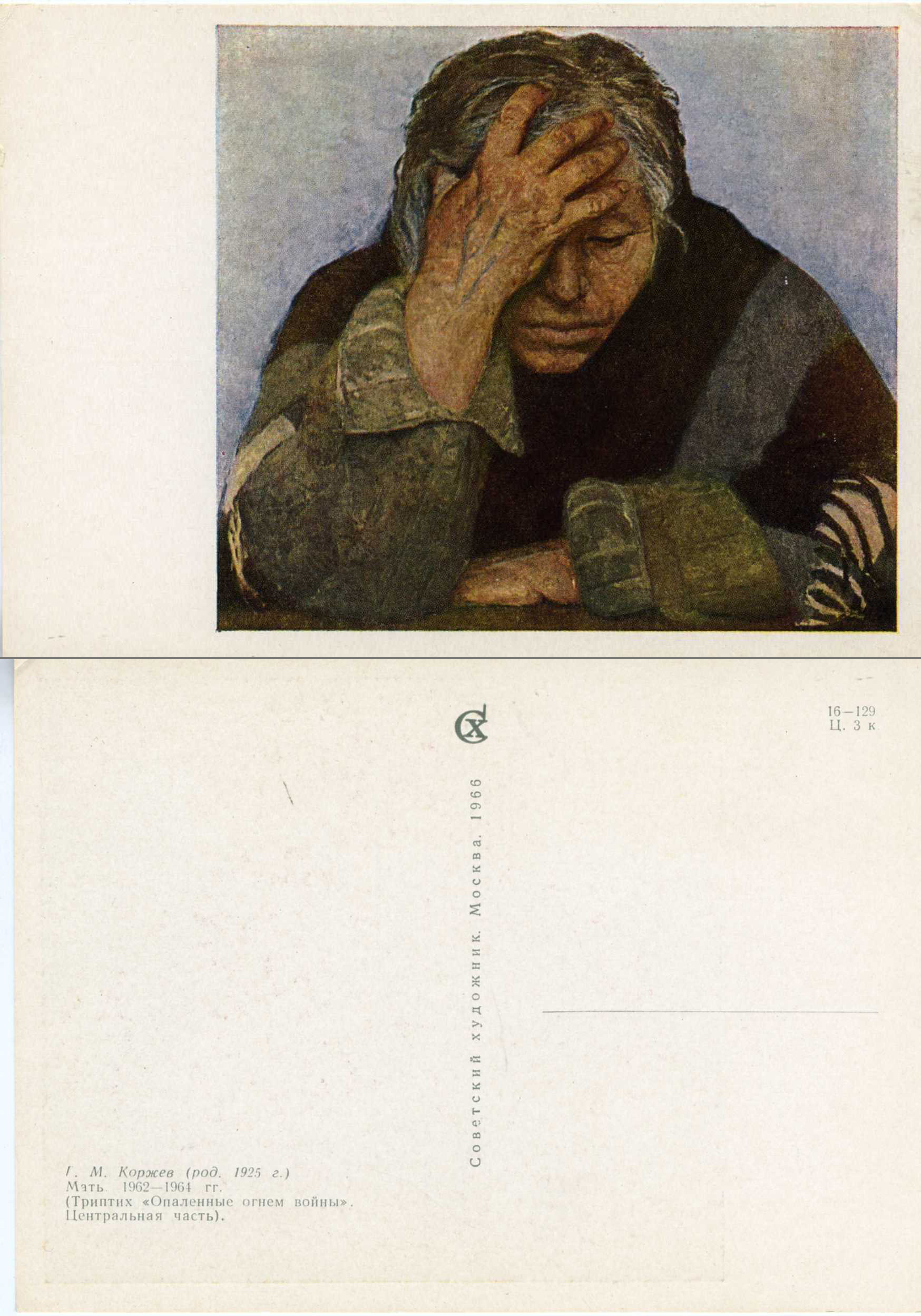
Mother
