= Vladimir Weisberg =

Russian painter

Vladimir Weisberg in his studio, Arbat, Moscow, 1982

Vladimir Grigoryevich Weisberg (Russian: Владимир Григорьевич Вейсберг, 7 June 1924 – 1 January 1985) was a Jewish Russian painter and art theorist.

== Biography ==
Son of the pedagogue and psychologist Weisberg Grigory (1884–1942). From 1943 to 1948, Weisberg studied in All-Union Central Council of Trade Unions (ACCTU).

Weisberg argued that the problems of colourism the way they existed after Cézanne have been exhausted and that the color unsaturated by semi-color carried very little information: any coloristic complexity is the result of the pigment differentiation. In 1960, Weisberg created a table of the major types of coloristic perception, their signs and structures.

Weisberg art tries to find the synchronicity between semitone, composition, and drawing. His works are exhibited at the Tretyakov Gallery, the Pushkin Museum of Fine Art and many other Russian and foreign museums. Most of his canvasses are scattered among various private collections.

Minor planet 4996 Veisberg was named in his honor in 1986.
