= Gun Shy (2017 film) =

- Theatrical release poster
- Directed by: Simon West
- Written by: Toby Davies; Mark Haskell Smith
- Based on: Salty by Mark Haskell Smith
- Produced by: Jib Polhemus; Harry Stourton; Simon West
- Starring: Antonio Banderas; Olga Kurylenko
- Cinematography: Alan Caudillo
- Edited by: Nick Morris
- Music by: David M. Saunders
- Production company: Salty Films
- Distributed by: Saban Films
- Release date: 8 September 2017
- Running time: 92 minutes
- Country: United Kingdom
- Box office: $2,480

Gun Shy is a British action comedy film directed by Simon West and starring Antonio Banderas that was released on 8 September 2017.

== Synopsis ==
Aging rock star Turk Enry's supermodel wife is kidnapped while they are vacationing in Chile and he undertakes to rescue her equipped with skills better suited to playing bass, playing the field, and partying.

== Cast ==
- Antonio Banderas as Turk Enry
- Olga Kurylenko as Sheila
- Ben Cura as Juan Carlos
- Mark Valley as Ben Harding
- Aisling Loftus as Marybeth
- David Mitchell as John Hardigger
- Jeremy Swift as Charlie
- Jesse Johnson as Daniel
- Ellie Goffe as Amy Fitzsimmons
- Martin Dingle-Wall as Clive Muggleton
- Milanka Brooks as TV Presenter
- Anna Francolini as Sandrine
- Christopher Brand as Russian Thug
- Fernando Godoy as Ramón
- Lester Ransom as Bar Owner
- Sebastián Apiolaza as Bandid
- Paul Manzi as Lead Singer for Metal Assassin
- Steevi Bacon as Drummer for Metal Assassin
- Greg Hart as Guitarist for Metal Assassin

== Production ==
Early poster displaying the working title Salty

The film was produced under the working title Salty (the name of the novel from which it is adapted) but the title was later changed to Gun Shy. The budget was obtained through equity crowdfunding, with the film raising £1.9 million on SyndicateRoom.

== Reception ==
On review aggregator Rotten Tomatoes, Gun Shy has an approval rating of 0% based on 11 reviews and an average rating of 2.9/10. On Metacritic, the film has a weighted average score of 21 out of 100 based on five critics, indicating "generally unfavorable reviews".
