= Decades (David Palfreyman and Nicholas Pegg album) =

Studio album by David Palfreyman and Nicholas Pegg
- Released: 28 July 2017
- Recorded: Spring 2014 – Summer 2016
- Studio: Yellow Fish Studios, Brighton
- Genre: Progressive rock, Pop
- Length: 86:50
- Label: Diteli Records Ltd
- Producer: David Palfreyman, Nicholas Pegg, Ian Caple

Decades is a 2017 double concept album by David Palfreyman and Nicholas Pegg, who co-produced it with Ian Caple.

The album features a cast of notable actors, singers and musicians, including David Warner, Richard Coyle, Jacqueline Pearce, Jan Ravens, Simon Greenall, Edward Holtom, Sarah Jane Morris, Cassidy Janson, Mitch Benn, David Palfreyman, Jessica Lee Morgan, Ian Shaw, Gary Barnacle, Greg Hart, Terry Edwards and Martyn Barker.

Decades is divided into four 'Acts' (corresponding to the four sides of the double vinyl format), and features 20 songs written by Palfreyman, alternating with a linking dramatic narrative written by Pegg. The narrative explores the shifting memories of the album's central character, Kelver Leash, who is played at different stages of his life by Warner, Coyle and Holtom.

== Recording ==
The music tracks on Decades were recorded at Yellow Fish Studios in Sussex between spring 2014 and summer 2016. The dialogue sequences were recorded at The Moat Studios, London, in January 2016.

== Release and reception ==
Decades was released on 28 July 2017. Critical reaction was favourable: Record Collector's Andy Rawll praised the "outstanding performances" and described the album as "an ambitious, thought-provoking contemporary musical drama about the cycle of life". Writing in Prog, Chris Roberts considered the album "a true progressive rock curio ... a meditation on time and memory, its ambition is simply colossal." The Spill Magazine hailed Decades as "an epic album ... remarkably brave and certainly brilliant", while We Are Cult described it as "a compelling listen" and "a shameless embrace of the full glory of what the concept album can do". Progradar considered Decades "an absolute delight from start to finish", and dubbed it "one of the albums of the year".

== Singles and videos ==
"We All Fall Down", featuring Sarah Jane Morris on lead vocal, was released as a single on 30 June 2017, a month ahead of the album. The single was accompanied by a video directed by Nicholas Pegg, which was shot on location on Dartmoor and featured Sarah Jane Morris alongside actors David Warner, Richard Coyle and Edward Holtom.

"Dead End Morning", featuring David Palfreyman on lead vocal, was released as the album's second single on 1 September 2017. The video was directed by Tom Saunders and Nicholas Pegg, and again featured actors David Warner, Richard Coyle and Edward Holtom alongside Palfreyman in an animated dystopian cityscape.

"Hurting, Sinking", featuring Jessica Lee Morgan on lead vocal, was released as the third Decades single on 8 December 2017. The video, released a week earlier, was directed by Paul Vanezis and featured Jessica Lee Morgan in a candle-lit room full of memorabilia, encountering her younger self in a mirror.

"Eyes Wide", featuring Cassidy Janson on lead vocal, was released as the fourth single from Decades on 20 April 2018. The video, directed by Tom Saunders, featured Cassidy Janson performing the song against a CGI backdrop of a train speeding through a surreal landscape, and once again featured cameo appearances by actors David Warner, Richard Coyle and Edward Holtom.

== Television and radio appearances ==
In 2018 the Decades band made several live appearances on Vintage TV, beginning with a performance for The Vintage TV Sessions transmitted on 25 January. For this appearance the band was fronted by Jessica Lee Morgan, who sang "Hurting, Sinking" and "Faraway Day" from the album. Morgan then included an acoustic version of "Hurting, Sinking" in her own live set for the same channel's Live With... series, transmitted on 7 March 2018. The following month, the full Decades band returned for another edition of The Vintage TV Sessions shown on 26 April 2018, this time showcasing three of the album's lead singers: the set comprised "Dead End Morning" sung by David Palfreyman, "Eyes Wide" sung by Cassidy Janson, and "Got To Be Seen To Be Believed" sung by Sarah Jane Morris.

Prior to these live appearances, the videos for "We All Fall Down" and "Hurting, Sinking" were also premiered on Vintage TV, as part of a 2017 edition of the video jukebox show My Vintage presented by Nicholas Pegg.

On 10 June 2018, David Palfreyman and Cassidy Janson appeared on London Live to discuss Decades and the single "Eyes Wide". A week earlier, "Eyes Wide" was premiered by Elaine Paige on her BBC Radio 2 show Elaine Paige on Sunday.

== Track listing ==
Credits per liner notes. Lead vocalists listed in parentheses.

Act I

1. "Decades"
2. "Faraway Day" (Jessica Lee Morgan)
3. "There Goes My Darling" (Mitch Benn)
4. "Dead End Morning" (David Palfreyman)
5. "Escape to Dream" (Beth Cannon)

Act II

1. "Kick On" (Ian Shaw, Sara Jane Morris)
2. "Got to Be Seen to Be Believed" (Sarah Jane Morris)
3. "Who Knows What Is True" (Beth Cannon)
4. "Love You 'Till Burn Out" (David Palfreyman)
5. "Lady Blue" (Eliza Skelton)

Act III

1. "Hurting, Sinking" (Jessica Lee Morgan)
2. "We All Fall Down" (Sarah Jane Morris)
3. "Full Circle" (Beth Cannon)
4. "Broken Trend" (Beth Cannon, David Palfreyman)
5. "Eyes Wide" (Cassidy Janson)

Act IV

1. "Blue Requiem" (Eliza Skelton)
2. "Some People Just Get All the Breaks" (David Palfreyman)
3. "Only For a Moment, Right Place, Wrong Time, Standing on the Corner" (David Palfreyman)
4. "Decades (Reprise)"

== Personnel ==
=== Actors ===
- David Warner – Kelver Leash
- Richard Coyle – Kelver as a younger man
- Edward Holtom – Kelver as a boy
- Jacqueline Pearce – Linda
- Simon Greenall – TV Reporter / Roger Fame / Freddie
- Jan Ravens – Jemima / Kelver's Mother / Lady Blue

=== Lead vocalists ===
- David Palfreyman – vocals, guitars
- Sarah Jane Morris – vocals
- Jessica Lee Morgan – vocals
- Ian Shaw – vocals
- Cassidy Janson – vocals
- Mitch Benn – vocals
- Beth Cannon – vocals
- Eliza Skelton – vocals

=== Other musicians ===
- Martyn Barker – drums, percussion
- Gary Barnacle – saxophone, flute
- Jack Birchwood – trumpet
- David Clayton – keyboards
- Ian Caple – keyboards, programmed percussion
- Otis Coulter – backing vocals
- Oz Dechaine – bass guitar
- Kat Downs – keyboards, backing vocals
- Terry Edwards – saxophone, trumpet
- John Fordham – saxophone
- Rodger Hanna – guitar, bass guitar
- Jono Harrison – keyboards, guitar
- Greg Hart – guitar, backing vocals
- Paul Manzi – backing vocals
- Adam Mart – violin
- Chris Musto – drums, percussion (for the live Decades band)
- Ben Nicholls – harmonium
- Eliska Palfreyman – backing vocals
- Nicholas Pegg – backing vocals
- Steve Rump – drums, percussion
- Christian Thomas – bass guitar (for the live Decades band)
- Mike Thompson – drums, percussion
- Pat Watters – guitar
