= Paul Manzi =

English singer and musician (born 1963)

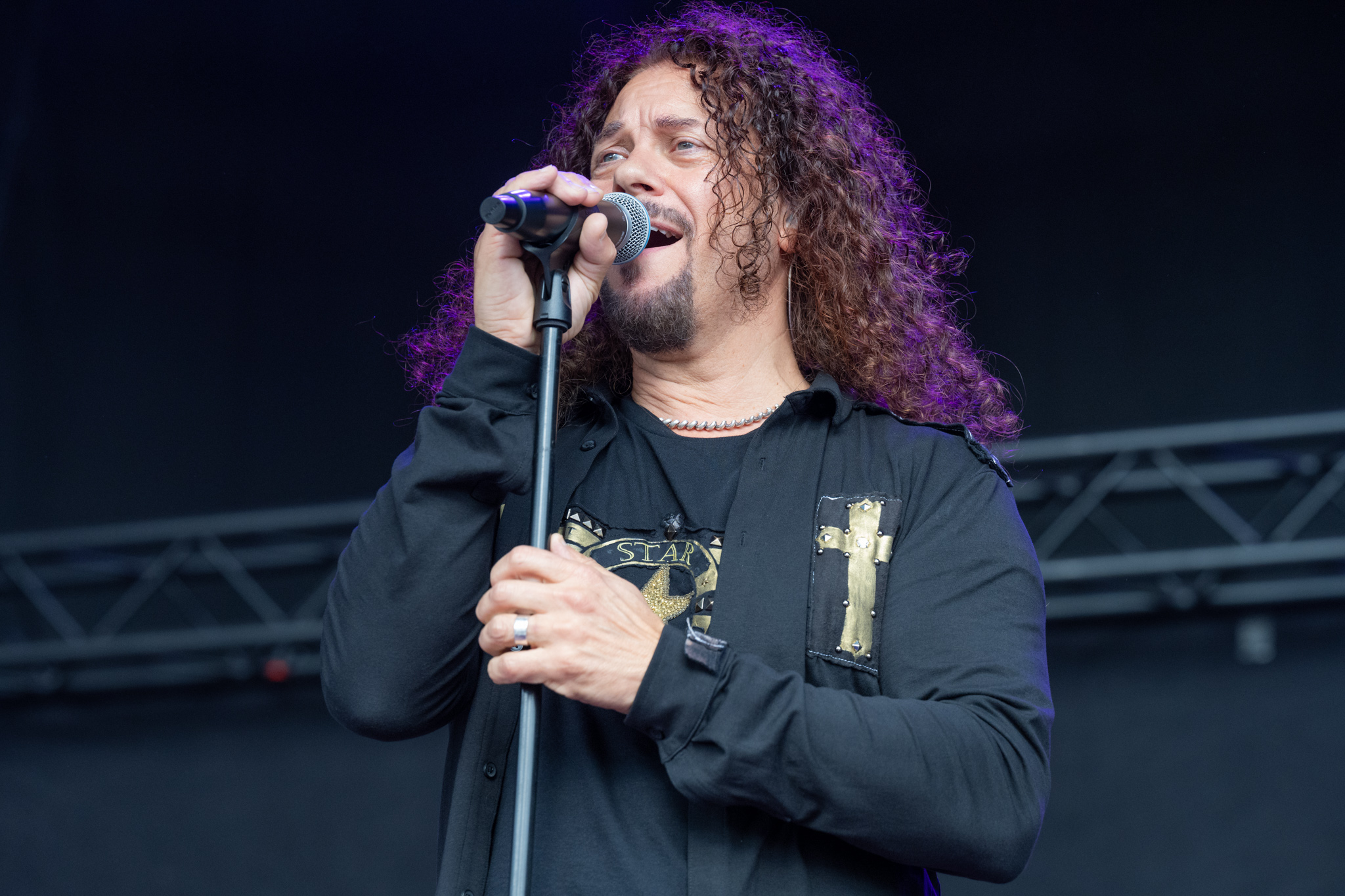
- Manzi performing with Sweet in 2023.

Background information
- Born: May 6, 1963 (age 62); North London, United Kingdom
- Genres: Glam rock; power pop; progressive rock; hard rock
- Occupation: Singer
- Instruments: Vocals; guitar; bass; keyboards
- Member of: Sweet; Oliver Wakeman; Raw Glory
- Formerly of: Cats in Space; Arena

Paul Manzi (born 6 May 1963) is an English singer, best known as a member of Sweet, Cats in Space and Arena, and for performing with the likes of Ian Paice, Gordon Giltrap and Oliver Wakeman.

== Career ==
=== Early career ===
Manzi chose performing arts over his other love, tennis. Manzi got his first guitar at 15 and played guitar in a school band. He originally wanted to be a guitarist like Jimmy Page, but became a singer after his distinctive voice was discovered at age 23. Other early influences include Led Zeppelin, Deep Purple, Rush and Queen. 2 years after he started singing he joined progressive rock band Barchetta and gained valuable recording experience at Abbey Road Studios and live experience at the Marquee Club.

He did some vocal session work and also performed with various cover bands as well as with trios/duos and as a solo singer/guitarist. he performed on lead vocals on soundtracks for musicals Phantasmagoria and Space Family Robinson. Manzi joined Oliver Wakeman (son of Rick Wakeman, later of Yes)'s band in 2004, he continues to perform with both the band, including guitarist Gordon Giltrap, and with Wakeman as a duo.

Manzi joined supergroup Raw Glory in 2006 with members of Judas Priest, Gillan and Heavy Metal Kids.

=== Arena ===
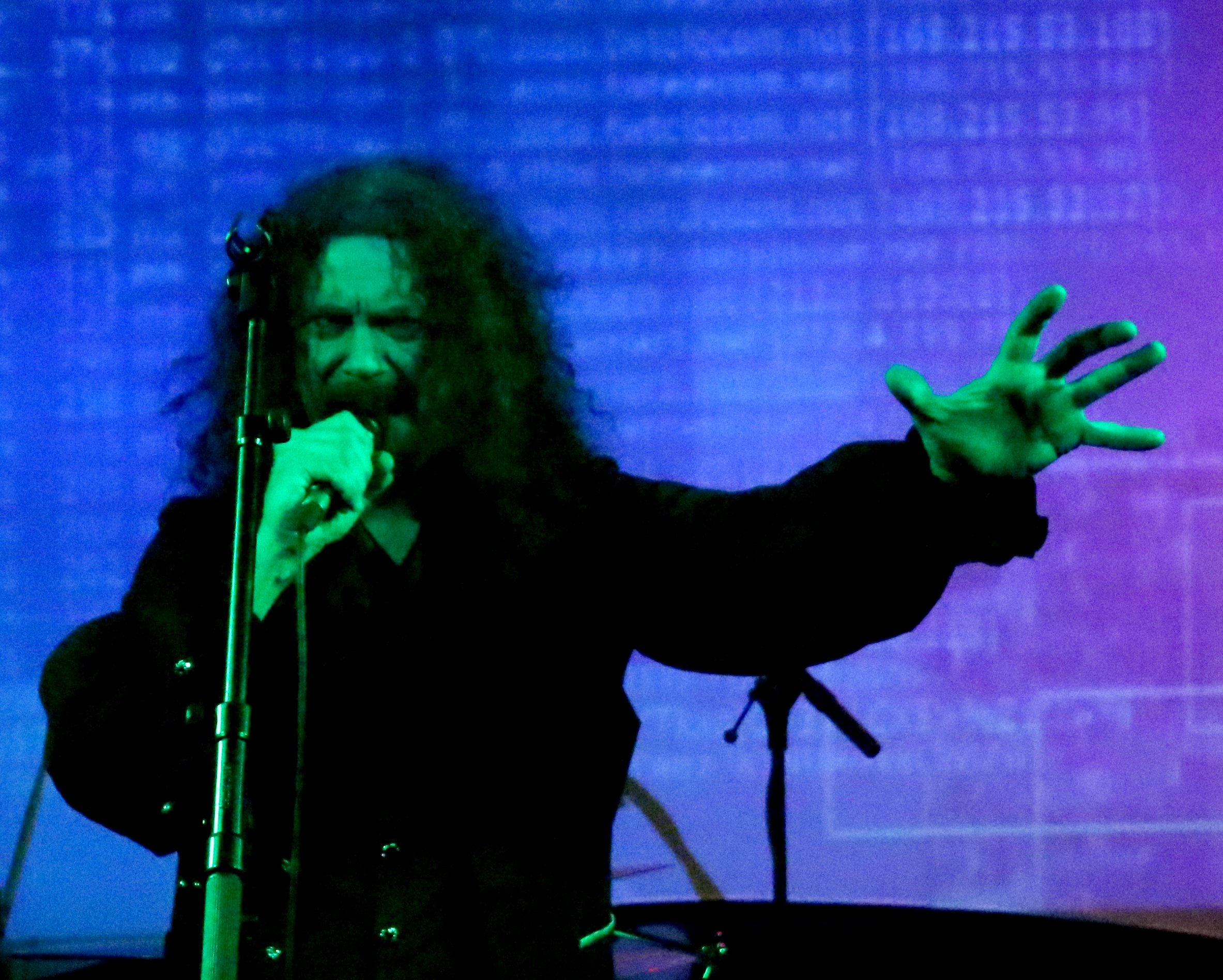
Manzi performing with Arena in 2019.

He joined neo-prog band Arena in 2010, replacing Rob Sowden. He wrote and recorded three acclaimed albums with them before his departure in 2020. Drummer and band leader Mick Pointer praised Manzi's vocal ability saying "clearly Paul Manzi has a much better voice range than any of the others [previous singers in the band] put together." In early 2026, Arena announced Manzi will return to the band after current singer Damian Wilson will step down at the end of 2026.

=== Sweet ===
He first joined Sweet temporarily on the 2014 tour in Australia, playing guitar and keyboards, covering for Tony O'Hora, who was absent for personal reasons. He next performed with the band in 2019, again on keyboards and guitar with O'Hora taking on vocals/bass duties as he had in previous years. He joined Sweet full time as lead singer later that year after O'Hora and Peter Lincoln's departure, he also contributed bass until Lee Small joined.

=== Cats in Space ===
Manzi joined newly formed rock band Cats in Space in 2016, he recorded four albums with the group as well as touring with the group which included highlights including British Summertime at Hyde Park with Phil Collins and support tours with Thunder, Deep Purple and Status Quo. In 2019 he left Cats in Space to join Sweet full time.

== Discography ==
Year	Artist	Title	Notes	Ref
2008	David Munyon & Mary's Band	Some Songs For Mary	lead vocals on 1 track, backing on 4	
2011	Arena	The Seventh Degree Of Separation	first studio album with Arena	
2013	Arena	Live	recorded on 2011/2012 tour	
2013	Gordon Giltrap & Oliver Wakeman	Ravens & Lullabies	lead vocals alongside Benoit David.	
2013	Clive Nolan	Alchemy Live	performs vocals of Milosh on DVD	
2013	Raw Glory	City Life	lead vocals	
2013	Arena	Rapture	live DVD recorded in Katowice, Poland on the 10th of November 2011.	
2015	Cats In Space	Too Many Gods	vocals alongside Mick Wilson	
2015	Arena	The Unquiet Sky	lead vocals	
2016	Arena	XX	Recorded on the 9th of April, 2015 in Katowice, Poland	
2017	David Palfreyman and Nicholas Pegg	Decades	backing vocals	
2017	Cats In Space	Scarecrow	lead vocals	
2018	Cats In Space	Cats Alive!	lead and backing vocals, acoustic guitar; recorded live at Cardiff Motorpoint Arena on March 24, 2017.	
2018	Arena	Double Vision	performer	
2019	Cats In Space	Daytrip To Narnia	performer	
2019	Arena	Re-Visited : Live!	lead vocals; recorded live at the Boerderij, Zoetermeer, Netherlands	
2020	Ayreon	Transitus	vocals for Henry	
2021	Sweet	Isolation Boulevard	lead vocals	
2021	Clive Nolan & Oliver Wakeman	Tales By Gaslight	lead vocals on two bonus tracks	
2021	Clive Nolan & Oliver Wakeman	Dark Fables	lead vocals on two bonus tracks	
