= Nicholas Pegg =

British actor, director and writer

Nicholas Pegg is a British actor, writer and director. He is best known for his work in the Doctor Who franchise on both television and audio, and for being a leading authority on the life and work of David Bowie.

== Education ==
Educated at Nottingham High School and graduating with a Master of Arts in English Literature from the University of Exeter, Pegg subsequently trained at the Guildford School of Acting.

== Acting ==
Pegg's acting work in the theatre includes productions for Nottingham Playhouse, Scottish Opera, Birmingham Repertory Theatre and the Theatre Royal, Plymouth. His television roles include appearances in EastEnders, Doc Martin and It's a Sin, and he has appeared as a Dalek operator in numerous episodes of Doctor Who. In his capacity as a Dalek operator he has also appeared in person on Blue Peter and in many editions of the documentary series Doctor Who Confidential. In November 2013 he appeared as himself in the 50th anniversary comedy homage "The Five(ish) Doctors Reboot".

Pegg has also worked on Doctor Who in the audio medium, acting, writing and directing for several Doctor Who audio plays produced by Big Finish Productions. For the same company, he played the Duke of Albany in King Lear (2017), Foxy-Faced Charles in The Box of Delights (2021), the Law Machines in Torchwood (2018), and Captain Smollett in Treasure Island (2013). His other acting roles include Gervais of Waringham in the 2020 Audible serial The Waringham Chronicles, and its 2017–18 Audible prequel serial Scarlet City, and Robert Wintour in the 2012 comedy film The Plotters. For the audiobook company Textbook Stuff he recorded the collected poems of Andrew Marvell, and for Penguin Audiobooks in 2013 he read the Doctor Who short stories Tip of the Tongue by Patrick Ness and Spore by Alex Scarrow.

On 19 January 2014, Pegg wrote and performed The UKIP Shipping Forecast, a satirical response to the pronouncements of various high-profile members of the UK Independence Party. The sketch went viral, receiving 250,000 hits in 4 days.

== Writing ==
=== David Bowie ===
As a writer, Nicholas Pegg is a noted authority on the life and work of David Bowie. He is the author of The Complete David Bowie (ISBN 9781785653650), published by Titan Books and described by Bowie's long-time producer Tony Visconti as "the best Bowie reference book one could ever hope for". Pegg has acted as consultant and contributor to numerous Bowie projects, including the 2022 Brett Morgen film Moonage Daydream, the BBC TV documentaries David Bowie: Five Years (2013) and David Bowie: The Last Five Years (2017), the Victoria and Albert Museum's exhibition David Bowie Is, the BBC Radio 2 documentary Exploring 'Life On Mars? (2017), and the same year's Royal Mail edition of commemorative Bowie stamps. He also worked on the Isle of Man Post Office's 2022 issue of commemorative stamps celebrating David Bowie's acting career. In May 2016 Pegg joined Marc Almond on stage at London's Ace Hotel to co-host a tribute to Bowie in the company of Lindsay Kemp, while in January 2017 Pegg teamed up with Gary Kemp of Spandau Ballet to make a short film for The Guardian website to mark the first anniversary of Bowie's death.

Also in 2017, Pegg appeared as a guest Bowie speaker at events including the Penzance Literary Festival and the Victoria and Albert Museum's Celebrating Bowie at 70. Since 2018 he has been a regular contributor to the Album to Album Bowie podcast series. In 2019 and 2021 he was a guest speaker at the annual Dublin Bowie Festival, and in 2022 he compered the David Bowie World Fan Convention in Liverpool, a role he would reprise at the 2023 event in New York. He also appeared as a Bowie expert in the 2007 TV documentary series Seven Ages of Rock, and has hosted Bowie radio specials for broadcasters in Australia and the United Kingdom.

In 2018, the author Philip Reeve said that Pegg's book The Complete David Bowie had "played an inspirational role" in the genesis of Reeve's Railhead trilogy of novels.

=== Decades ===
Nicholas Pegg is the co-creator of the 2017 concept album Decades, a collaboration with songwriter David Palfreyman which features a cast of various actors, singers and musicians, including David Warner, Richard Coyle, Jacqueline Pearce, Jan Ravens, Simon Greenall, Sarah Jane Morris, Mitch Benn, Jessica Lee Morgan, Ian Shaw, Gary Barnacle, Greg Hart, Terry Edwards and Martyn Barker. In April 2018 Pegg appeared with David Palfreyman on the Vintage TV show The Vintage TV Sessions, introducing a live session by the Decades band, having previously presented a 2017 edition of the same channel's video jukebox show My Vintage, during which he introduced a selection of his favourite music videos and premiered the videos for the Decades singles 'We All Fall Down' and 'Hurting, Sinking'.

=== Scriptwriting ===
Pegg has written stage plays, including numerous pantomimes for British theatres including Harrogate Theatre, the Queen's Theatre, Hornchurch, the MacRobert Playhouse in Stirling, and the Theatre Royal, Nottingham. He is also the author of the Doctor Who audio play The Spectre of Lanyon Moor, and he adapted the text of King Lear for the 2017 Big Finish version starring David Warner.

=== Other writing ===
Pegg has written for publications including Mojo, Q Magazine, Pride Life, and Doctor Who Magazine. His other writing credits include the short stories Deep Water and Hold Your Horses for the 2008 and 2009 Doctor Who Storybooks as well as contributions to The Doctor Who Annual and The Brilliant Book of Doctor Who. He has also written numerous features for the BBC's range of DVD releases of the Doctor Who television series. He wrote Cheques, Lies and Videotape, a documentary about the heyday of pirate videos, which appeared on the DVD release of Revenge of the Cybermen. He also wrote When Worlds Collide, a documentary about politics and ideology in Doctor Who, which appeared on the DVD release of The Happiness Patrol, and A Matter of Time, a documentary about Doctor Who under the producership of Graham Williams, which was the leading special feature on the Key to Time series box set. Pegg has worked as script editor on several other documentary features, appears as moderator for the Doctor Who DVD audio commentaries of The Mutants and Resurrection of the Daleks (Special Edition), and wrote the "info text" subtitles for many DVD releases.

In October 2017, Pegg, under his regular pseudonym of The Watcher, concealed a crude acrostic message in his regular "Wotcha" column in Doctor Who Magazine, in which the first letters of each sentence spelled out the message "Panini ..." (publishers of Doctor Who Magazine) " ...and BBC Worldwide are cunts". HuffPost reported that this led to his dismissal from the magazine and from Doctor Who. The report turned out to be inaccurate, as Pegg has continued to work regularly on the series. Alternative accounts suggest that the decision to cancel his column had already been made and that it was this decision that led to Pegg writing the hidden message. Pegg's column that month was subtitled "The column that is not something to be shuffled off on to some stray boffin, you know" (ostensibly a reference to a line of dialogue by the character Brownrose from the 1971 story Terror of the Autons, mentioned in passing in the article.)

== Directing ==
In addition to several Doctor Who audio plays for the Big Finish series, Pegg's work as a director includes theatre productions of Hamlet, Twelfth Night, Peter Pan, Funny Money, I Thought I Heard a Rustling, and Diary of a Somebody.

== Personal life ==
Pegg's long-term partner is actor Barnaby Edwards. Guesting at the 2017 Pride Cymru event Who's Queer Now, a symposium celebrating the impact and influences of Doctor Who on LGBT people, the couple revealed that they were celebrating their 25th anniversary.

== Doctor Who credits ==
Pegg has operated the Daleks in numerous episodes of Doctor Who since 2005:

- "Bad Wolf"
- "The Parting of the Ways"
- "Army of Ghosts"
- "Doomsday"
- "Daleks in Manhattan"
- "Evolution of the Daleks"
- "The Stolen Earth"
- "Journey's End"
- "Victory of the Daleks"
- "Asylum of the Daleks"
- "The Day of the Doctor"
- "The Five(ish) Doctors Reboot" (as a Dalek and as himself)
- "The Time of the Doctor"
- "The Magician's Apprentice"
- "The Witch's Familiar"
- "Revolution of the Daleks"
- "The Vanquishers"
- "Eve of the Daleks"
- "The Power of the Doctor"

He has also written, featured in or directed a number of Doctor Who audio plays for Big Finish Productions:

- The Sirens of Time – actor
- The Marian Conspiracy – actor
- The Spectre of Lanyon Moor – actor, writer, director
- The Holy Terror – director
- Storm Warning – actor
- Loups-Garoux – actor, director
- The One Doctor – actor
- Bang-Bang-a-Boom! – director
- Doctor Who and the Pirates – actor
- Shada – actor, director
- Robophobia – actor

Pegg has also contributed to the following Doctor Who DVD releases:

- The Reign of Terror – writer, "info text" subtitles
- The Krotons – script editor, Second Time Around documentary
- The Dæmons – script editor, Remembering Barry Letts documentary
- The Mutants – moderator on audio commentary
- Planet of the Spiders – writer, "info text" subtitles / script editor, The Final Curtain documentary
- Revenge of the Cybermen – writer, Cheques, Lies and Videotape documentary / writer, "info text" subtitles
- Terror of the Zygons – interviewer, Scotch Mist in Sussex documentary
- The Android Invasion – writer, "info text" subtitles / script editor, The Village that Came to Life documentary
- Underworld – script editor, Into the Unknown documentary
- The Ribos Operation – writer, A Matter of Time documentary
- The Armageddon Factor – interviewer, Defining Shadows documentary
- The Creature from the Pit – writer, "info text" subtitles
- Nightmare of Eden – writer, "info text" subtitles
- Shada – writer, "info text" subtitles
- State of Decay – writer, "info text" subtitles
- The Visitation (Special Edition) – writer, "info text" subtitles
- Resurrection of the Daleks (Special Edition) – script editor, Come in Number Five documentary / moderator on audio commentary
- The Happiness Patrol – writer, When Worlds Collide documentary
