= Len Wein =

American comic book writer and editor (1948–2017)

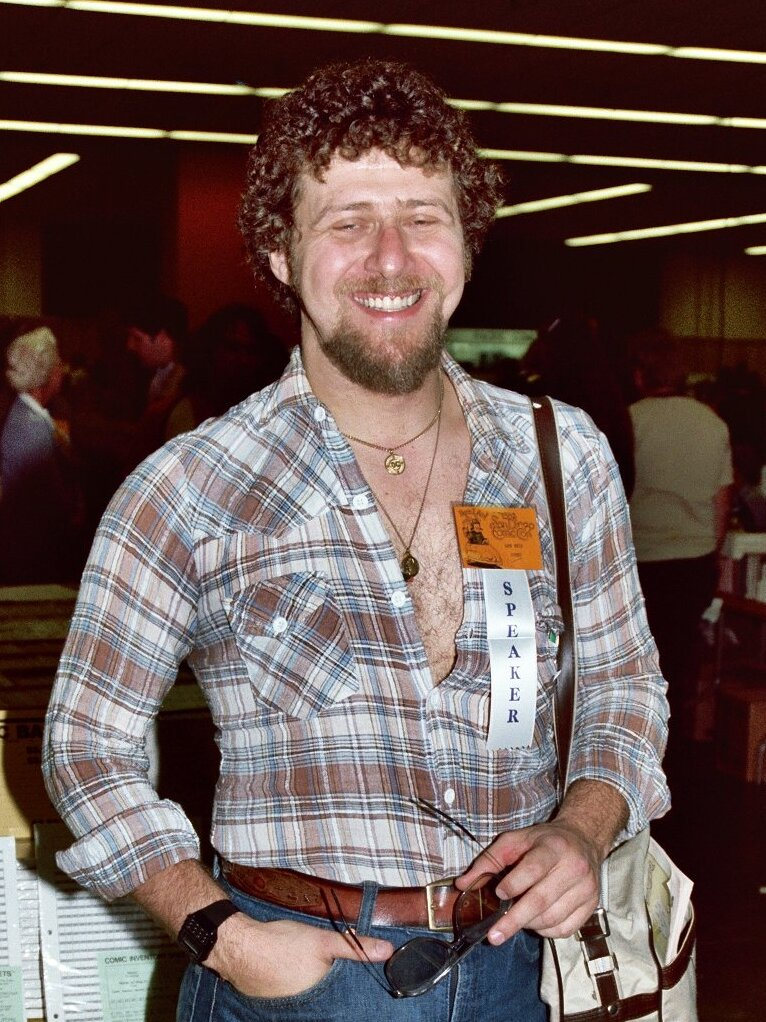
- Wein in 1982
- Born: Leonard Norman Wein; June 12, 1948 New York City, U.S.
- Died: September 10, 2017 (aged 69) Los Angeles, California, U.S.
- Areas: Writer, Editor
- Notable works: Swamp Thing; Wolverine; X-Men; The Human Target; Justice League
- Awards: Shazam Award (1972, 1973); Inkpot Award (1979); Comics Buyers Guide Award (1982); Will Eisner Comic Book Hall of Fame (2008)
- Spouses: Glynis Oliver (c. 1972–1985) Christine Valada (m. 1991)

Leonard Norman Wein (/wiːn/; June 12, 1948 – September 10, 2017) was an American comic book writer and editor best known for co-creating DC Comics' Swamp Thing and Marvel Comics' Wolverine, and for helping revive the Marvel superhero team the X-Men (including the co-creation of Nightcrawler, Storm, and Colossus). Additionally, he was the editor for writer Alan Moore and illustrator Dave Gibbons' influential DC miniseries Watchmen.

Wein was inducted into the Will Eisner Comic Book Hall of Fame in 2008.

== Early life and education ==
Wein was born on June 12, 1948, in New York City, and was raised in a Jewish household. One of two children of Phillip and Rosalyn (née Bauman) Wein, he lived in The Bronx until age 7, when he moved with his family to Levittown, New York, on Long Island. There he graduated from Division Avenue High School in 1966, and went on to an art degree from nearby Farmingdale State College. Wein's younger brother, Michael, died in 2007.

In a 2003 interview, Len Wein recalled having been "a very sickly kid. While I was in the hospital at age seven, my dad brought me a stack of comic books to keep me occupied. And I was hooked. When my eighth grade art teacher, Mr. Smedley, told me he thought I had actual art talent, I decided to devote all my efforts in that direction in the hope that I might someday get into the comics biz."

Approximately once a month, as a teenager, Wein and his friend Marv Wolfman took DC Comics' weekly Thursday afternoon tour of the company's offices. The pair regularly attended the tours around 1967 with teens who would become future coworkers such as Mark Hanerfeld (whom they had originally met during 1965's "Academy Con"), Gerry Conway, and Steve Mitchell. Wolfman was active in fanzine culture, and together he and Wein produced sample superhero stories to show to the DC editorial staff. At that point, Wein was more interested in becoming an artist than a writer. In a 2008 interview, Wein said his origins as an artist have helped him "describe art to an artist so that I can see it all in my own head", and claimed he "used to have artists, especially at DC, guys like Irv Novick and a few of the others, who would come into the office waiting for their next assignment and ask [editor] Julie Schwartz, 'Do you have any Len Wein scripts lying around? He's always easy to draw.'"

== Career ==
DC editor Joe Orlando hired both Wolfman and Wein as freelance writers. Wein's first professional comic story was "Eye of the Beholder" in DC's Teen Titans #18 (Dec. 1968), in which he co-created, alongside Wolfman, Red Star—the first official Russian superhero in the DC Universe. Neal Adams was called upon to rewrite and redraw a Teen Titans story which had been written by Wein and Wolfman. The story, titled "Titans Fit the Battle of Jericho!", would have introduced DC's first African American superhero but was rejected by publisher Carmine Infantino. The revised story appeared in Teen Titans #20 (April 1969).

Later that year, Wein was writing anthological mystery stories for DC's The House of Secrets and Marvel's Tower of Shadows and Chamber of Darkness. He additionally began writing for DC's romance comic Secret Hearts and the company's toyline tie-in Hot Wheels; Skywald Publications' horror-comics magazines Nightmare and Psycho and its short-lived Western comic books The Bravados and The Sundance Kid; and Gold Key Comics' Mod Wheels, Boris Karloff Tales of Mystery, the toyline tie-in Microbots, and the TV-series tie-ins Star Trek and The Twilight Zone.

=== DC and Marvel Comics ===
Wein's first superhero work for Marvel was a one-off story in Daredevil #71 (Dec. 1970) co-written with staff writer/editor Roy Thomas. Wein later began scripting sporadic issues of such DC superhero titles as Adventure Comics (featuring Supergirl and Zatanna), The Flash, and Superman, while continuing to write anthological mysteries, along with well-received stories for the semi-anthological occult title The Phantom Stranger #14–26 (Aug. 1971 – Sept. 1973).

Wein and artist Bernie Wrightson created the horror character the Swamp Thing in The House of Secrets #92 (July 1971). Over the next several decades, the Swamp Thing would star in DC series and miniseries – including an initial 1972–76 series begun by Wein and Wrightson, and the early 1980s The Saga of the Swamp Thing, edited by Wein and featuring early work by writer Alan Moore—as well as two theatrical films, and a syndicated television series. Abigail Arcane, a major supporting character in the character's mythos, was introduced by Wein and Wrightson in Swamp Thing #3 (March 1973). Wein wrote the second story featuring Man-Thing (written circa May 1971, published in June 1972), introducing Barbara Morse and the concept that "Whatever Knows Fear Burns at the Man-Thing's Touch!", and later edited Steve Gerber's run on that title.

Wein wrote a well-regarded run of Justice League of America (issues #100–114) wherein, together with artist Dick Dillin, he re-introduced the Seven Soldiers of Victory in issues #100–102 and the Freedom Fighters in issues #107–108. Libra, a supervillain created by Wein and Dillin in Justice League of America #111 (June 1974), would play a leading role in Grant Morrison's Final Crisis storyline in 2008.

In the fall of 1972, Wein and writers Gerry Conway and Steve Englehart crafted a metafictional unofficial crossover spanning titles from both major comics companies. Each comic featured Englehart, Conway, and Wein, as well as Wein's first wife Glynis, interacting with Marvel or DC characters at the Rutland Halloween Parade in Rutland, Vermont. Beginning in Marvel's Amazing Adventures #16 (by Englehart with art by Bob Brown and Frank McLaughlin), the story continued in DC's Justice League of America #103 (by Wein, Dillin and Dick Giordano), and concluded in Marvel's Thor #207 (by Conway and penciler John Buscema). As Englehart explained in 2010, "It certainly seemed like a radical concept and we knew that we had to be subtle (laughs) and each story had to stand on its own, but we really worked it out. It's really worthwhile to read those stories back to back to back – it didn't matter to us that one was at DC and two were at Marvel – I think it was us being creative, thinking what would be really cool to do."

Wein co-created the Human Target with artist Carmine Infantino and wrote the character's appearances as a backup feature in Action Comics, Detective Comics, and The Brave and the Bold. The character was adapted into a short-lived ABC television series starring Rick Springfield which debuted in July 1992, and was briefly revived in 2010 for a two-season series on Fox that starred Mark Valley, Chi McBride, and Jackie Earle Haley.

He briefly wrote the "Batman" feature in Detective Comics and produced a storyline with artist Jim Aparo and in which Batman was framed for the murder of Talia al Ghul and battled Sterling Silversmith for the first time.

In the early 1970s, Wein began writing regularly for Marvel Comics. He succeeded Roy Thomas as editor-in-chief of the color-comics line in 1974, staying a little over a year before handing the reins to Wolfman. Remaining at Marvel as a writer, Wein had lengthy runs on Marvel Team-Up, The Amazing Spider-Man, The Incredible Hulk, Thor, and Fantastic Four, as well as shorter runs on such titles as The Defenders and "Brother Voodoo". Wein co-created Wolverine with artist John Romita Sr. during his run on The Incredible Hulk. Wein's story "Between Hammer and Anvil" from The Incredible Hulk vol. 2, #182 (Dec. 1974) was later cited in Tony Isabella's book 1,000 Comics You Must Read.

In 1975, he and artist Dave Cockrum revived the Stan Lee / Jack Kirby mutant-superhero team the X-Men after a half-decade's hiatus, reformatting the membership in Giant-Size X-Men #1 (May 1975). Among the characters the duo created for the series were Nightcrawler, Storm, Colossus, and Thunderbird. Wein plotted the early "new X-Men" stories with artist Cockrum. These issues were then scripted as Uncanny X-Men #94-95 by Chris Claremont, who subsequently developed the title into one of Marvel's leading franchises. In 2009, Claremont said, "The history of modern comics would be incredibly different if you took [Wein's] contributions out of the mix. The fact he doesn't get credit for it half the time is disgraceful. We owe a lot of what we are – certainly on the X-Men – to Len and to Dave [Cockrum]".

=== Return to DC ===
In 1977, following an offer to script the "Batman" feature in Detective Comics, Wein left Marvel to work exclusively at DC Comics as a scriptwriter and editor.

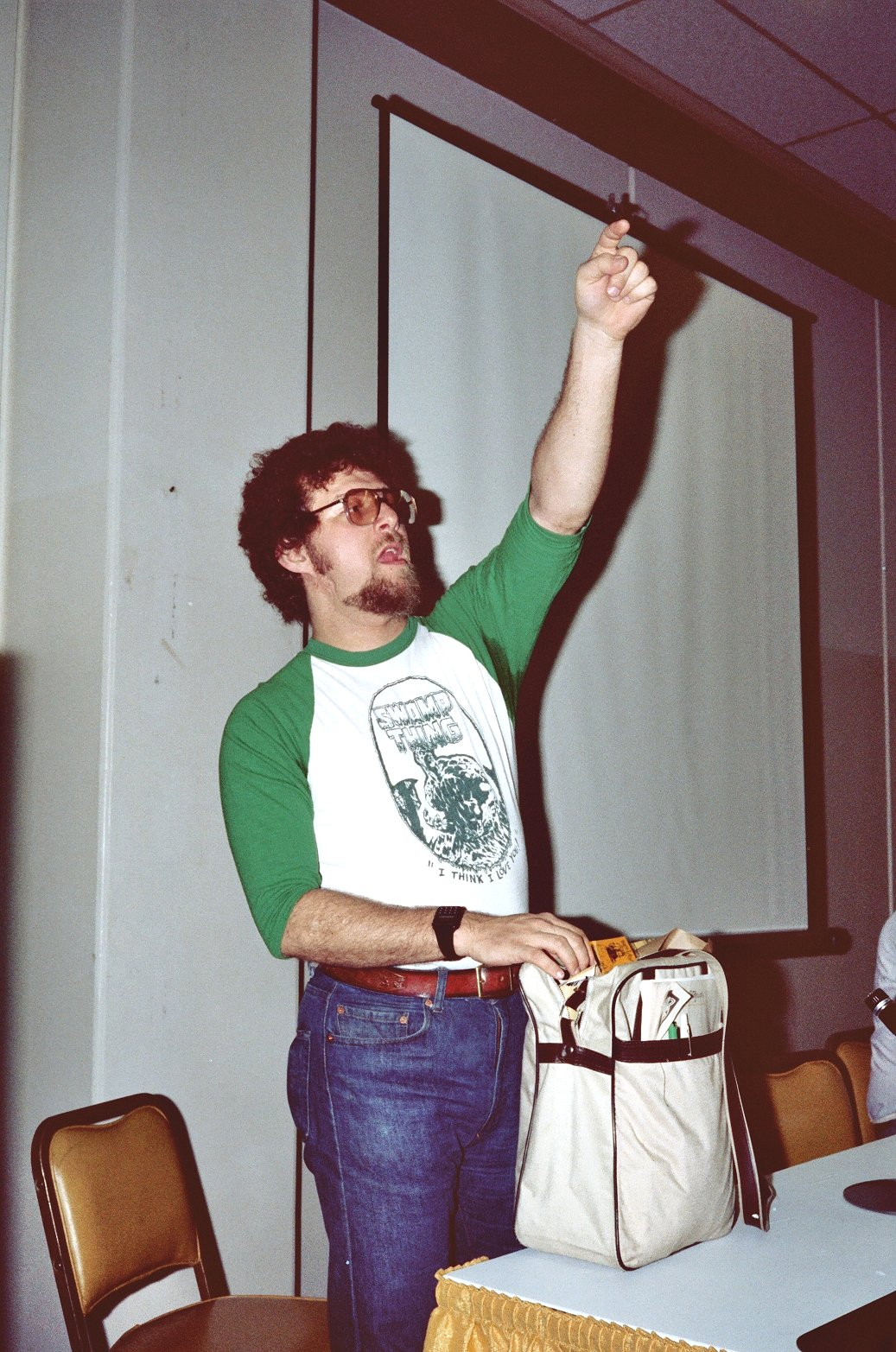
Len Wein in 1982

He scripted Batman and collaborated on Green Lantern with artists Dave Gibbons and Mark Farmer. On his first issue of Batman, #307 (Jan. 1979), he created Wayne Foundation executive Lucius Fox, later portrayed by Morgan Freeman in the movies Batman Begins, The Dark Knight, and The Dark Knight Rises. With artist Marshall Rogers, Wein co-created the third version of the supervillain Clayface in Detective Comics #478 (Aug. 1978). He wrote The Untold Legend of the Batman, the first Batman miniseries, in 1980 and the following year wrote a DC-Marvel crossover between Batman and the Hulk in DC Special Series #27 (Fall 1981). Pandora Pann was a proposed series by Wein and artist Ross Andru which was to have been published in 1982 but other commitments prevented Wein from writing it and the project was cancelled. As editor, he worked on the first twelve-issue limited series Camelot 3000, and such successful series as The New Teen Titans, All-Star Squadron, Batman and the Outsiders, Who's Who in the DC Universe, and Alan Moore and Dave Gibbons's acclaimed and highly influential Watchmen. In 1986, he wrote a revival of the Blue Beetle, two issues of the DC Challenge limited series, and dialogued the miniseries Legends over the plots of John Ostrander. The following year, Wein scripted the rebooted Wonder Woman series over penciller George Pérez's plots. With artist Steve Erwin, Wein co-created the superhero Gunfire.

=== Later career ===
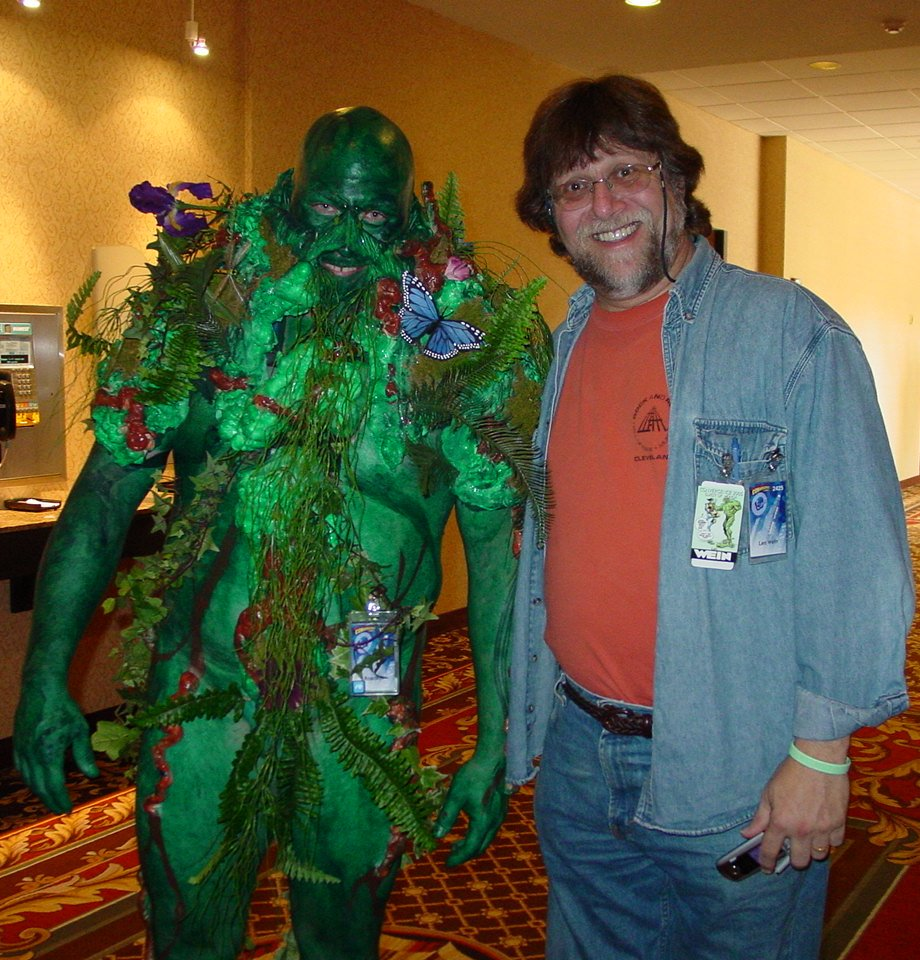
Len Wein (right) next to a cosplayer in 2005

Following his second stint at DC and a move to the West Coast, Wein served as editor-in-chief of Disney Comics for three years in the early 1990s. After leaving Disney, Wein began writing and story editing for such animated television series as X-Men, Batman, Spider-Man, Street Fighter, ExoSquad, Phantom 2040, Godzilla, Pocket Dragon Adventures, ReBoot and War Planets: Shadow Raiders. In 2001, he and Wolfman wrote the screenplay Gene Pool for the production company Helkon, and later wrote a prequel to the screenplay for a one-shot comic book for IDW Publishing.

Wein collaborated with writer Kurt Busiek and artist Kelley Jones on the four-issue miniseries Conan: The Book of Thoth for Dark Horse Comics. He scripted the comics series The Victorian for Penny-Farthing Press and wrote comic-book stories for Bongo Comics' TV-series tie-ins The Simpsons and Futurama.

From 2005 to 2008, Wein appeared as a recurring panelist on the Los Angeles-based stage revival of the TV game show What's My Line? He wrote episodes of the Cartoon Network animated series Ben 10: Alien Force, Ben 10: Ultimate Alien, Ben 10: Omniverse and the Marvel Super Hero Squad.

Wein was interviewed for commentary tracks on comics-related DVDs, including the animated Justice League: The New Frontier film, the live-action Spider-Man, Fantastic Four and X-Men films, the X-Men Origins: Wolverine film, the Watchmen film, the Swamp Thing TV-series sets, the Human Target first season TV series, and the July 2008 History Channel specials Batman Unmasked and Batman Tech.

He wrote the storyline for the Watchmen video game, The End Is Nigh, which serves as a backstory to both the comic and the film adaptation.

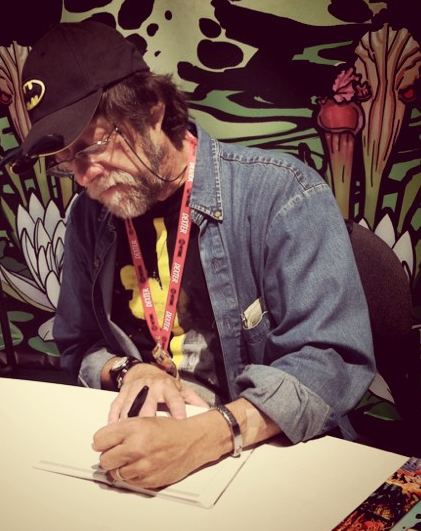
Wein in 2011

Wein returned to comics writing for DC in the late 2000s, where he collaborated in the DC Comics nostalgic event DC Retroactive writing stories for the one-shot specials Batman – The '70s (September 2011) drawn by Tom Mandrake and Green Lantern – The '80s (October 2011) drawn by Joe Staton. The hardcover collection of his 10-issue DC Universe: Legacies was published in August 2011. In 2012, Wein worked on the Before Watchmen project, writing the mini-series Ozymandias with art by Jae Lee and the serialized feature "Curse of the Crimson Corsair" with art by Watchmen colorist John Higgins. The hardcover collection of the Ozymandias storyline spent several weeks on the New York Times Bestseller List in 2013. In 2015, he and José Luis García-López produced Batman '66: The Lost Episode, a comics adaptation of a Two-Face story pitch by Harlan Ellison originally intended for the Batman television series. In 2016, DC published a six-issue limited Swamp Thing series by Wein and artist Kelley Jones.

== Personal life ==
Wein's first wife was Glynis Oliver, a comics colorist who spent years on the X-Men titles; they were married some time prior to 1972. Following their 1985 divorce, he married Christine Valada, a photographer and attorney, in 1991, and became stepfather to Michael Bieniewicz-Valada.

On April 6, 2009, Wein's California home burned down with considerable loss of property and mementos, including his Shazam Awards. He and his wife also lost their dog, Sheba, to the fire. Beginning October 26, 2009, Valada appeared on and won the television game show Jeopardy!, becoming a four-time champion with winnings of over $60,000. She indicated on the show that she would use the money to recover or replace much of the artwork and books the couple lost in the fire.

Wein underwent triple-bypass heart surgery on February 10, 2015. He died on September 10, 2017.

== Awards ==
- 1972:
  - Shazam Award for Best Writer (Dramatic) for Swamp Thing
  - Shazam Award (with Bernie Wrightson) for Best Individual Story (Dramatic), for "Dark Genesis" in Swamp Thing #1
- 1973:
  - Shazam Award (with Bernie Wrightson) for Best Continuing Feature for Swamp Thing
  - (nomination) Shazam Award for Best Writer (Dramatic) for Swamp Thing
  - (nomination) Shazam Award (with Bernie Wrighton) for Best Individual Story (Dramatic) for "A Clockwork Horror" in Swamp Thing #6
  - Comic Fan Art Award (nomination) for Favorite Pro Writer
- 1974:
  - Comic Fan Art Award for Favorite Pro Writer
  - Comic Fan Art Award (with Bernie Wrightson and Joe Orlando) for Favorite Comic-Book Story for "Night of the Bat" in Swamp Thing #7
- 1977 Inkpot Award
- 1982 Comics Buyer's Guide Fan Award for Best Editor
- 1998 (nomination) Bram Stoker Award, given by the Horror Writers Association, for the one-shot The Dreaming: Trial and Error, from DC's Vertigo imprint
- 2008 Will Eisner Comic Book Hall of Fame

== Bibliography ==
=== Bongo Comics ===
- Futurama Comics #30 (2007)
- Simpsons Comics #129, 138 (2007, 2008)
- Treehouse of Horror #11, 19 (2005, 2013)

=== Comico ===
- Justice Machine #27–29, Annual #1 (1989)

=== DC Comics ===
- Action Comics #419–420, 422–423, 425–426, 429, 432 (Human Target); #515 (Atom); #519 (Aquaman) (1972–1981)
- Adventure Comics #413–415, 418–420 (Supergirl and Zatanna features); #457–458 (Eclipso; #459 Deadman, and Elongated Man features); #460–466 (Deadman), #467–468 (Plastic Man) (1971–1980)
- The Adventures of Jerry Lewis #109 (1968)
- All-Star Western #11 (El Diablo) (1972)
- Batman #255, 307–310, 312–319, 321–324, 326–327 (1974–1980)
- Batman '66: The Lost Episode #1 (2015)
- Batman: A Word to the Wise #1 (promo) (1992)
- Batman Black and White vol. 2 #5 (2014)
- Batman: Hidden Treasures #1 (afterword) (2010)
- Batman: Nevermore #1–5 (2003)
- Before Watchmen: Comedian #1–2 (2012)
- Before Watchmen: Dollar Bill #1 (2013)
- Before Watchmen: Minutemen #1–2 (2012)
- Before Watchmen: Nite Owl #1–2 (2012)
- Before Watchmen: Ozymandias #1–6 (2012–2013)
- Before Watchmen: Rorschach #1 (2012)
- Before Watchmen: Silk Spectre #1–2 (2012)
- Blue Beetle #1–24 (1986–1988)
- The Brave and the Bold #143–144 (Human Target) (1978)
- Cancelled Comic Cavalcade #2 (Deadman) (1978)
- Convergence: Detective Comics #1–2 (2015)
- Convergence: Swamp Thing #1–2 (2015)
- Crisis on Infinite Earths #1 (1985)
- Danger Trail #1–4 (1993)
- DC Challenge #2, 12 (1985–1986)
- DC Comics Presents #4–5, 24, 27–29, 38, 61, 66–67 (1978–1984)
- DC Comics Presents: Batman #1 (2004)
- DC Retroactive: Batman – The '70s #1 (2011)
- DC Retroactive: Green Lantern – The '80s #1 (2011)
- DC Special Series #27 (Batman/Hulk intercompany crossover) (1981)
- DC Universe: Legacies #1–10 (2010–2011)
- Deathstroke, the Terminator #18, Annual #2 (1993)
- Detective Comics #408, 444–448, 466, 478–479, 500, 514 (Batman); #426 (Elongated Man); #479–480 (Hawkman); #482–485 (Etrigan the Demon); #483–484, 486, 493 (Human Target); #500 (Slam Bradley) (1971–1982)
- The Dreaming Special #1 (1998)
- Final Crisis: Secret Files #1 (2009)
- The Flash #208, 212, 215, 217 (1971–1972)
- Green Lantern vol. 2 #128, 172–183, 185–186 (1980–1985)
- Green Lantern Annual #5 (1996)
- Gunfire #1–13 (1994–1995)
- Heroes Against Hunger #1 (1986)
- Hot Wheels #4–6 (1970–1971)
- House of Mystery #191, 197, 199, 221, 223, 276, 300, 303 (1971–1982)
- House of Secrets #84–85, 92, 94–98, 127 (1970–1975)
- Human Target #1–6 (2010)
- JLA 80-Page Giant #2 (1999)
- Jonah Hex #49, 51–52 (1981)
- Justice League Dark: Futures End #1 (2014)
- Justice League of America #100–114, Annual #1 (1972–1983)
- Justice League of America vol. 2 #29–30, 35–37 (2009)
- Justice League Special #1 (1990)
- Justice League: Cry for Justice #1–2, 4–6 (backup stories) (2009–2010)
- Korak, Son of Tarzan #46–51 (1972–1973)
- Legends #1–6 (1986–1987)
- Legends of Tomorrow (Metal Men feature) #1–6 (2016)
- Mister Miracle vol. 2 #7–13 (1989–1990)
- Mystery in Space #113 (1980)
- The New Titans #88 (1992)
- Phantom Stranger vol. 2 #14–26 (1971–1973)
- Secret Hearts #149 (1971)
- Secret Origins vol. 2 #2, 19, 44 (1986–1989)
- The Shadow #4 (1974)
- Showcase '93 #1–2, 10 (1993)
- Showcase '94 #1–2 (1994)
- Sinister House of Secret Love #2 (1971)
- Star Trek #31–37, 39–40 (1986–1987)
- Superboy and the Legion of Super-Heroes #246–247 (1978–1979)
- Supergirl #1–2 (Zatanna backup stories) (1972–1973)
- Superman #246, 248, 251, 254, 258, 336–342, 344, 370–371, Special #3 (1971–1985)
- Superman/Batman Annual #3 (2009)
- Swamp Thing #1–13 (1972–1974)
- Swamp Thing miniseries #1–6 (2016)
- Swamp Thing Winter Special #1 (2018) (Posthumous release)
- Tales of the Green Lantern Corps #1–3 (1981)
- Tales of the Green Lantern Corps Annual #1 (1985)
- Teen Titans #18 (1968)
- Trinity of Sin: The Phantom Stranger #19 (2014)
- The Untold Legend of the Batman #1–3 (1980)
- Weird War Tales #3, 10, 22–23, 30, 36, 40, 108 (1972–1982)
- Weird Worlds #1–3 (1972)
- The Witching Hour #13 (1971)
- Wonder Woman #212 (1974)
- Wonder Woman vol. 2 #3–16 (1987–1988)
- World's Finest Comics #207–208 (1971)

=== Dark Horse ===
- Conan: The Book of Thoth #1–4 (with Kurt Busiek) (2006)

=== Defiant Comics ===
- Dark Dominion #1–3, 5–7, 10 (1993–1994)
- The Good Guys #8 (1994)
- Warriors of Plasm #5–7 (1993–1994)
- Warriors of Plasm Graphic Novel #1 (1993)

=== Disney Comics ===
- Dick Tracy #3 (1990)

=== Eclipse Comics ===
- Airboy #38–40 (1988)

=== Gold Key ===
- The Twillight Zone #35–37, 39–41, 47, 73, 79 (1973–1979)

=== IDW Publishing ===
- Gene Pool OGN (with Marv Wolfman) (2003)

=== Image Comics ===
- 21 #1–3 (1996)
- Cyberforce/Strykeforce: Opposing Forces #2 (with Steve Gerber) (1995)
- Outlaw Territory (anthology) Volume 2 (2011)
- Supreme Annual #1 (1995)

=== Marvel Comics ===
- 2099 Unlimited #10 (1995)
- The Amazing Spider-Man #151–180, Annual #10 (1975–1978)
- Astonishing Tales #8 (1971)
- Chamber of Darkness #6 (1970)
- Conan the Barbarian #116 (1980)
- Creatures on the Loose #11, 13 (1971)
- Daredevil #71, 124 (1970–1975)
- The Defenders #7, #12–19 (1973–1975)
- Dracula Lives #8 (1974)
- Fantastic Four #154–156, 182, 184–188, 191–194 (1975–1978)
- Giant-Size Chillers #1, 3 (1975)
- Giant-Size Defenders #2 (1974)
- Giant-Size Man-Thing #5 (1975)
- Giant-Size Spider-Man #1–2 (1974)
- Giant-Size X-Men #1 (1975)
- The Incredible Hulk #145, 179–220, 222, Annual #5–6 (1971, 1974–1978)
- Iron Man #82–85 (1976)
- Kull the Conqueror #8 (1973)
- Marvel 75th Anniversary Celebration #1 (Wolverine story) (2014)
- Marvel Comics Presents #11, 47, 53–56, 67, 69 (1989–1991)
- Marvel Feature #11 (1973)
- Marvel Premiere #16 (1974)
- Marvel Preview #2, 10 (1975–1977)
- Marvel Spotlight #30 (1976)
- Marvel Team-Up #12–27 (1973–1974)
- Midnight Sons Unlimited #1 (1993)
- Power Man #17–19, 21 (1974)
- Savage Tales #6 (1974)
- Shadows and Light #1 (1998)
- Spoof #1 (1970)
- Strange Tales #169–174 (1973–1974)
- Tales of the Zombie #6 (1973)
- Thor #213, 242–253, 255–271, Annual #6 (1973–1978)
- Tower of Shadows #3 (1970)
- Ultraforce vol. 2 #10–15 (1996)
- Ultraverse Unlimited #2 (1996)
- Uncanny Origins #12, 14 (1997)
- Werewolf by Night #5–8 (1973)
- Western Gunfighters #5–7 (1971–1972)
- Worlds Unknown #7–8 (1974)
- X-Men #94–95 (1975)
- X-Men: Black Sun #2 (2000)
- X-Men: Gold #1 (2014)

=== Skywald Publications ===
- Blazing Six-Guns #1–2 (1971)
- Bravados #1 (1971)
- Nightmare #1 (1970)
- Psycho #4 (1971)
- Sundance Kid #1 (1971)
- Wild Western Action #1 (1971)

=== Warren Publishing ===
- 1984 Magazine #5 (1979)
- Creepy #92, 100, 105, 107, 118 (1977–1980)
- Eerie #22, 48 (1969–1973)
- Vampirella #10, 26, 45, 75 (1971–1979)

=== Other publishers ===
- Aurora Comic Scenes #187–140

== Filmography ==
=== Screenwriting credits ===
- The Transformers (1986)
  - Webworld
- Batman: The Animated Series (1992)
  - Moon of the Wolf
  - Off Balance
  - The Demon's Quest: Part 2
- X-Men: The Animated Series (1993–1994, 1997)
  - Repo Man
  - Out of the Past
  - Old Soldiers
- Conan and the Young Warriors (1994)
  - Covenant
- Exosquad (1994)
  - Expendable
  - Miracle
  - Call of the Unknown
- Phantom 2040 (1994–1995)
  - Dark Orbit (Part One)
- G.I. Joe Extreme (1995)
  - Crawling from the Wreckage
- Iron Man (1995)
  - Fire and Rain
- Ultraforce (1995)
  - Pump It Up!
- Spider-Man: The Animated Series (1995–1996)
  - The Alien Costume, Part One
  - Sins of the Fathers Chapter 10: Venom Returns
- Gargoyles (1996)
  - To Serve Mankind
- Hypernauts (1996)
  - A Walk in the Garden
- Street Fighter (1996)
  - Chunnel Vision
  - Cammy Must Die!
- The Incredible Hulk (1996)
  - Man to Man, Beast to Beast
- Beast Wars: Transformers (1997)
  - Tangled Web
- Mummies Alive! (1997)
  - Tree O'Clock Rock
- ReBoot (1997–1999)
  - Between A Raccoon & A Hard Place
  - Web Riders on the Storm
  - Showdown
- Godzilla: The Series (1998)
  - What Dreams May Come
- Pocket Dragon Adventures (1998)
  - Attack of the 50 ft. Binky
  - Follow The Leader
  - Here There Be Dragons
  - A Kite To Remember
  - Masquerade
  - Raiders Of The Lost Cookies'
  - Winter Take All
- RoboCop: Alpha Commando (1998–1999)
  - Justice Reborn: Part 1
  - Father's Day
  - Out of the Dark
  - Das Re-Boot
  - Talk About the Weather
- Shadow Raiders (1998–1999)
  - Behold, the Beast
  - Uneasy Hangs the Head
  - Ragnarok, Part Two
  - Behold, the Beast
- Avengers: United They Stand (1999)
  - Command Decision
- Beast Machines: Transformers (2000)
  - Savage Noble
- Kong: The Animated Series (2000)
  - Howling Jack
- Action Man (2001)
  - Tower Of Power
- Kappa Mikey (2006)
  - The Fugi-Kid
- Ben 10: Alien Force (2009–2010)
  - Trade Off
  - Vendetta
- Ben 10: Ultimate Alien (2010)
  - Hit 'Em Where They Live
  - ...Nor Iron Bars a Cage
- The Super Hero Squad Show (2011)
  - So Pretty When They Explode!
- Ben 10: Omniverse (2012–2014)
  - Have I Got a Deal for You
  - Rules of Engagement
  - Max's Monster
  - It's a Mad, Mad, Mad Ben World, Part 2
- Beware the Batman (2014)
  - Attraction
- Avengers Assemble (2015)
  - The Dark Avengers
- Transformers: Robots in Disguise (2016–2017)
  - Cover Me
  - Prepare for Departure

Preceded by Roy Thomas	Marvel Comics Editor-in-Chief; 1974–1975	Succeeded by Marv Wolfman
Preceded by n/a	Swamp Thing writer 1972–1974	Succeeded by David Michelinie
Preceded by Mike Friedrich	Justice League of America writer 1972–1974	Succeeded by Dennis O'Neil
Preceded by Gerry Conway and Roy Thomas	The Incredible Hulk writer 1974–1977	Succeeded by Roger Stern
Preceded by Gerry Conway	The Amazing Spider-Man writer 1975–1978	Succeeded by Marv Wolfman
Preceded by Bill Mantlo	Thor writer 1975–1978 (with Marv Wolfman in 1976)	Succeeded by Roy Thomas
Preceded by Mike Friedrich	Iron Man writer 1976 (with Roger Slifer in part of the run)	Succeeded by Bill Mantlo
Preceded by Gerry Conway	Fantastic Four writer 1977–1978	Succeeded by Marv Wolfman
Preceded by Steve Englehart	Detective Comics writer 1978	Succeeded by Dennis O'Neil
Preceded by Ross Andru	Justice League of America editor 1979–1984	Succeeded by Alan Gold
Preceded by Ross Andru	The Flash editor 1979–1982	Succeeded by Mike W. Barr
Preceded by Ross Andru	Wonder Woman editor 1979–1982	Succeeded by Marv Wolfman
Preceded by Jack C. Harris	World's Finest Comics editor 1981–1982	Succeeded by Mike W. Barr
Preceded by n/a	The New Teen Titans editor 1980–1983	Succeeded by Marv Wolfman and George Pérez
Preceded by n/a	All-Star Squadron editor 1981–1982	Succeeded by Roy Thomas
Preceded by n/a	Saga of the Swamp Thing editor 1982–1984	Succeeded by Karen Berger
Preceded by n/a	Watchmen editor 1986–1987	Succeeded by Barbara Randall
Preceded by Greg Potter	Wonder Woman writer 1987–1988	Succeeded by George Pérez
Preceded by Dwayne McDuffie	Justice League of America writer 2009–2009	Succeeded by James Robinson
