= David Palfreyman =

British actor and musician

- Born: 26 September 1966 (age 59); Sheffield, England
- Writing career
- Pen name: Malf
- Website: www.malf.co.uk

David Palfreyman (born 26 September 1966) is an English songwriter, musician, actor and poet.

== Music ==
David Palfreyman is best known for the 2017 double album Decades, a collaboration with Nicholas Pegg, for which Palfreyman wrote the music and lyrics, singing lead vocal on several tracks. Alongside Palfreyman and Pegg, the album features a cast of notable actors, singers and musicians, including David Warner, Richard Coyle, Jacqueline Pearce, Jan Ravens, Simon Greenall, Edward Holtom, Sarah Jane Morris, Cassidy Janson, Mitch Benn, Jessica Lee Morgan, Ian Shaw, Gary Barnacle, Greg Hart, Terry Edwards and Martyn Barker. Decades is David Palfreyman's second album, following his 2010 debut RadioMagnetofon, which was released under his nickname Malf.

Starting out as a trombone player in his early teens, Palfreyman performed at the Royal Albert Hall and other venues around the UK with The William Rhodes School Band and Rhodian Brass, leading to his first experience of studio recording playing trombone on the 1980 LP The Sound Of Rhodian Brass. Switching from trombone to guitar, Palfreyman played and sang with a number of bands during the late 1980s and early 1990s, before forming his first group, The Custard Garage, in 1995. Having turned solo, he released the first Malf EP in 2008. Palfreyman has toured extensively in the UK, America and Europe. In 2018, he performed with Jessica Lee Morgan on the Vintage TV show The Vintage TV Sessions, playing songs from the Decades album.

== Acting and writing ==
Palfreyman trained as an actor at Richmond Drama School (part of Richmond Adult Community College), graduating in 2000. His acting work includes productions for the Crucible Theatre in Sheffield, the Canal Cafe Theatre in London, and the Horla Theatre Company. TV credits include appearances in EastEnders and Peak Practice, voice-overs for the BBC's Newsnight and Sky Sports' Modern Pentathlon World Cup coverage, and roles in the films Oi Queer, Baseline and Brassed Off. He appears as himself in Cheques, Lies and Videotape, a documentary about pirate videos which appears on the DVD release of the Doctor Who serial Revenge of the Cybermen.

His poems have been published in the Arrival Press anthology Poems of the Midlands (ISBN 1857861582) and the Anchor Books anthology Forward Press Poets 2008: South and East England (ISBN 9781844184798).

David Palfreyman's other vocations have included baker, fork lift truck driver, journalist, window cleaner and taxi driver. He is distantly related to the 19th-century novelist and poet George Eliot.
