= Cats in Space =

British rock band (2015–present)

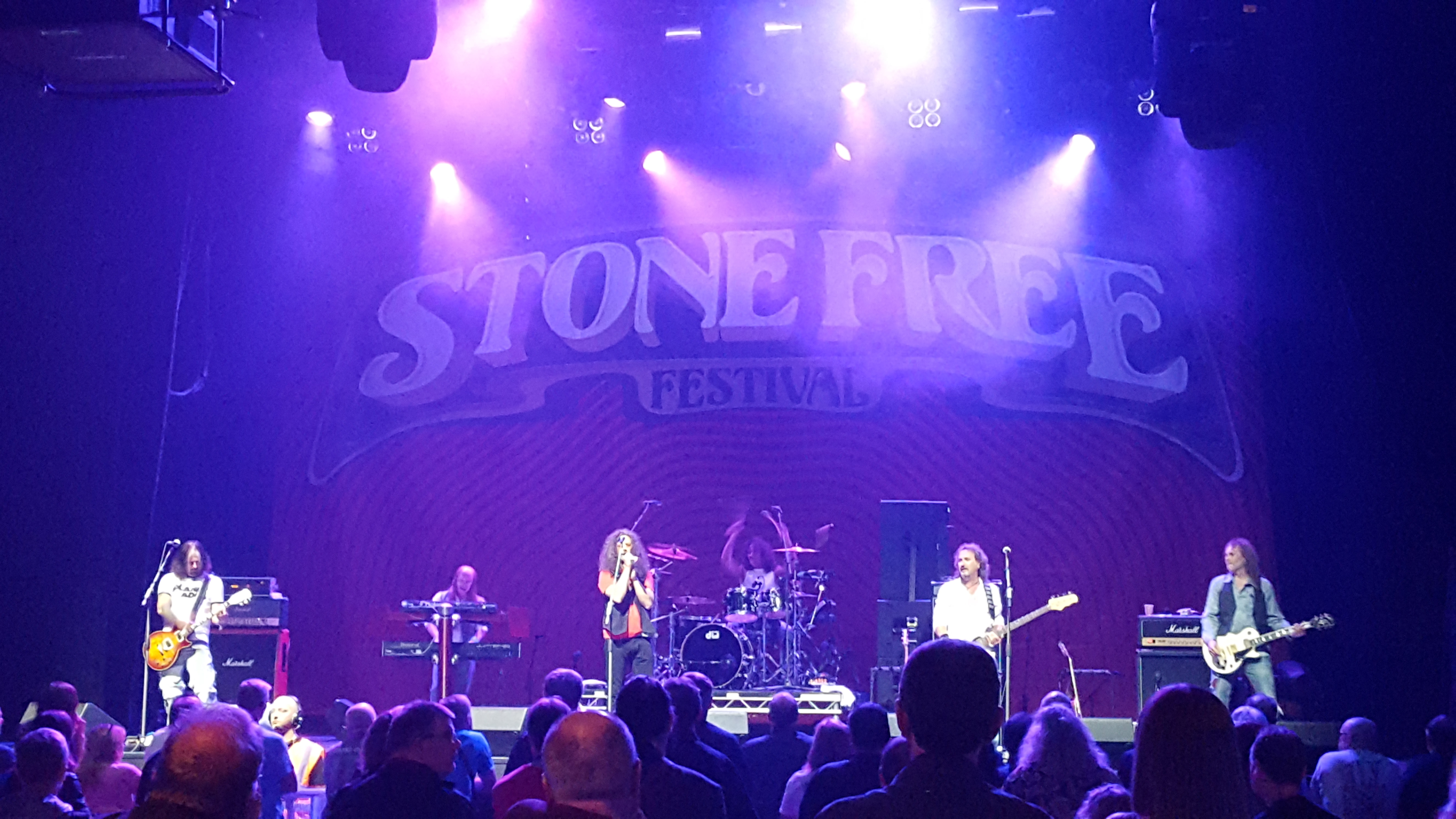
- CATS in SPACE - London O2 Indigo 2016

Background information
- Origin: Horsham, West Sussex
- Genres: Glam rock, power pop, hard rock, pop rock
- Years active: 2015–present
- Members: Greg Hart; Steevi Bacon; Sam Wood; Chris Childs; Andy Stewart; Mick Wilson; Damien Edwards
- Past members: Paul Manzi; Mark Pascall/Dean Howard; Jeff Brown
- Website: www.catsinspace.co.uk

Cats in Space is a British rock band formed in Horsham, West Sussex, in 2015 by guitarist Greg Hart and drummer Steevi Bacon. Singer Paul Manzi, keyboardist Andy Stewart, bassist Jeff Brown, and second guitarist Dean Howard joined later.

== History ==
Cats in Space released their debut album, Too Many Gods, in 2015. A second album was released in 2017.

== Members ==
=== Current ===
- Greg Hart – guitars / backing vocals / synth
- Steevi Bacon – drums / percussion / backing vocals
- Sam Wood – guitars / backing vocals
- Chris Childs – bass guitar / backing vocals
- Andy Stewart – piano / keyboards / synths
- Mick Wilson – co-lead vocals/backing vocals and additional instrumentation
- Damien Edwards – lead vocals / backing vocals

=== Former ===
- Paul Manzi – lead vocals / backing vocals
- Mark Pascall – lead vocals / backing vocals
- Dean Howard – guitars / backing vocals
- Jeff Brown – bass guitar / backing vocals

== Discography ==
=== Studio albums ===
- Too Many Gods (31 October 2015, Harmony Factory Records)
- Scarecrow (25 August 2017, Harmony Factory Records)
- Day Trip To Narnia (1 March 2019, Harmony Factory Records)
- My Kind of Christmas (6 December 2019, Harmony Factory Records)
- Atlantis (27 November 2020, Harmony Factory Records)
- Kickstart the Sun (29 July 2022, Harmony Factory Records)
- Time Machine (25 October 2024, Esoteric Recordings/Cherry Red Records)
- Suit Of Armour (6 November 2026, Esoteric Antenna/Cherry Red Records)

=== Live albums ===
- Cats Alive! (23 February 2018, Harmony Factory Records)
- Fire In The Night (5 July 2024, Harmony Factory Records)

=== Compilation albums ===
- Diamonds: The Best Of Cats In Space (3 August 2018, Harmony Factory Records)
- Chapter 1 (25 July 2025, Harmony Factory Records)
