= Human Target (1992 TV series) =

- Title card for the 1992 ABC television series Human Target
- Genre: Action; Drama; Spy fiction
- Created by: Danny Bilson; Paul DeMeo
- Based on: Christopher Chance by: Len Wein; Carmine Infantino
- Starring: Rick Springfield; Kirk Baltz; Sami Chester; Signy Coleman
- Opening theme: Human Target
- Composers: Anthony Marinelli; Stanley Clarke
- Country of origin: United States
- Original language: English
- No. of seasons: 1
- No. of episodes: 7

Production
- Executive producers: Danny Bilson; Paul DeMeo; Steve Hattman
- Running time: 60 minutes
- Production companies: Pet Fly Productions; Warner Bros. Television

Original release
- Network: ABC
- Release: July 20 – August 29, 1992

Human Target is an American action drama television series broadcast by ABC in the United States. It is based on the DC comic book character of the same title created by Len Wein and Carmine Infantino, and developed for television by Danny Bilson and Paul DeMeo. The seven-episode series premiered on July 20, 1992, and last aired on August 29 the same year. The more recent 2010 Fox television series of the same name, is also based on the Human Target character.

== Synopsis ==
The series follows the adventures of Christopher Chance (Rick Springfield), a Vietnam War vet turned bodyguard and private investigator who uses advanced technology and sophisticated makeup to assume the identity of his client, becoming a human target. In a departure from the original comic book stories, Chance flies from job to job in a large, gizmo-laden stealth aircraft known as the Blackwing. Additionally, he is assisted by computer expert Philo Marsden (Kirk Baltz), Blackwing pilot Jeff Carlyle (Sami Chester), and former CIA operative Libby Page (Signy Coleman). Page coordinated Chance's missions, Carlyle also served as cook and chauffeur, while Marsden created new gadgets and developed the masks Chance used to impersonate his clients. Chance took an unusual approach to compensation for his services: ten percent of his client's annual income ("whether you're a busboy or the king of England"). One reviewer described the show as "50 percent Mission: Impossible (Martin Landau's master of disguise character) and 50 percent Quantum Leap (jumping into other people's lives at moments of crisis)".

== Cast ==
- Rick Springfield as Christopher Chance
- Kirk Baltz as Philo Marsden
- Sami Chester as Jeff Carlyle
- Signy Coleman as Libby Page

== Production ==
The show was created by Warner Bros. Television and Pet Fly Productions, producers of The Flash and later Viper and The Sentinel for Paramount Pictures. The original pilot for the series was filmed in 1990 but ABC declined to pick up the series for the 1990-91 television season and this pilot never aired. In the original unaired pilot, musician Clarence Clemons who was trying to establish himself as an actor, played Chance's pilot and Frances Fisher as Libby Page.

Harvey Shephard, then the president of Warner Bros. Television, told The New York Times in December 1991 that Human Target was intended for both American audiences and the international television market.

The show was finally picked up in October 1991 by ABC as a seven-episode midseason replacement series, eventually airing in July and August 1992 to low ratings and poor critical reception. The debut episode aired on Monday, July 20, before moving to its regular Saturday night time slot for the following six episodes. The seventh and final episode aired on Saturday, August 29.

== Episodes ==
No.	Title	Directed by	Written by	Original release date	Prod. code
1	"Pilot"	Max Tash	Paul DeMeo & Bruce Bilson	July 20, 1992	206788
Chance is hired to protect Jay Palmer (Scott Paulin), an architect and construction company owner who believes his life is in danger. Chance has to fool not only Palmer's colleagues but also his wife and children.
2	"Second Chance"	Mario Azzopardi	Rick Natkin	July 25, 1992	187352
Chance assumes the identity of an American general (R. Lee Ermey) who was nearly assassinated but then Chance discovers that the would-be assassin is his mentor (David Carradine).
3	"Designed by Chance"	Danny Bilson	Kevin Droney	August 1, 1992	187355
Chance takes on the identity of fashion designer Garner St. John (John Wesley Shipp) who once had a romantic relationship with Libby.
4	"Mirror Image"	Bruce Bilson	Thania St. John	August 8, 1992	187356
A psychiatrist (David Clennon) believes that one of his patients has him marked for death so he hires Chance to uncover the would-be killer.
5	"Cool Hand Chance"	Bill Corcoran	Stephen Hattman, Rick Natkin & Scott Richardson	August 15, 1992	187353
Chance breaks into a prison in an attempt to clear the name of a man convicted of murder.
6	"Going Home"	Mario Azzopardi	Don Carlos Dunaway & William A. Schwartz	August 22, 1992	187354
Chance assumes the identity of a judge targeted by an unknown attacker and is reunited with his father during the mission.
7	"Chances Are"	Danny Bilson	Howard Chaykin & John Francis Moore	August 29, 1992	187351
A television reporter finds her life threatened by the subject of her investigation and Chance makes an emotional connection while trying to protect her.

== Tie-ins ==
Cover of The Human Target Special #1

In November 1991, DC Comics produced a 48-page one-shot titled The Human Target Special #1, marketed as a tie-in to the then-upcoming television show (the comic's cover advertised that it was "Coming soon to ABC-TV!"). The comic has Chance and his team protecting a DEA agent from assassination. It was written by Mark Verheiden, with pencils by Rick Burchett and inks by Dick Giordano.

== Reception ==
Ken Tucker of Entertainment Weekly graded the series a "C−", describing the plot of the aired pilot episode as "paper-thin" and that the series as a whole "seems campy in a dumb way, with stilted dialogue and stiff action scenes". Writing in the Chicago Tribune, Rick Kogan called the series "one of the goofiest action-adventure shows you'll ever see". Terry Kelleher's review in Newsday complained that "the strangest aspect is that the actor playing [Chance]'s client [...] winds up grabbing more screen time than [series star Rick] Springfield". Syndicated columnist Jon Burlingame of United Features credited the show with "some interesting effects" but called the drama itself "pretty tired", lamenting that "the outrageously appropriate comic-book style of The Flash" was "completely absent". Lon Grahnke of the Chicago Sun-Times found "part-time pop singer and [...] matinee idol" Springfield "hard to believe in the title role" as a retired Special Forces commando. In real life, Springfield did spend time in Vietnam during the war, but as part of an Australian band entertaining American troops in 1969.
