= Human Target (2010 TV series) =

Television show filmed in Vancouver

- Genre: Action; Comedy-drama; Spy thriller
- Based on: Christopher Chance by: Len Wein; Carmine Infantino
- Developed by: Jonathan E. Steinberg
- Starring: Mark Valley; Chi McBride; Jackie Earle Haley; Indira Varma; Janet Montgomery
- Theme music composer: Bear McCreary (season 1); Tim Jones (season 2)
- Opening theme: "Theme from Human Target"
- Composers: Bear McCreary (season 1); Tim Jones (season 2)
- Country of origin: United States
- Original language: English
- No. of seasons: 2
- No. of episodes: 25

Production
- Executive producers: Jonathan E. Steinberg; Brad Kern; Kevin Hooks; McG; Peter Johnson; Matt Miller
- Production locations: Vancouver, British Columbia, Canada
- Cinematography: Brian Pearson (pilot); Rob McLachlan
- Editors: John Duffy; Philip Neel; Michael Hathaway; Craig Bench; Russell Denove
- Running time: 42 minutes
- Production companies: Wonderland Sound and Vision; DC Entertainment; Bonanza Productions; Warner Bros. Television

Original release
- Network: Fox
- Release: January 15, 2010 – February 9, 2011

Human Target is an American spy action television series that was broadcast by Fox in the United States. Based loosely on the Human Target comic book character created by Len Wein and Carmine Infantino for DC Comics, it is the second series based on this title developed for television, the first TV series having been aired in 1992 on ABC. Developed by Jonathan E. Steinberg, Human Target premiered on CTV in Canada and on Fox in the United States in January 2010.

The series stars Mark Valley, Chi McBride, Jackie Earle Haley, with Indira Varma and Janet Montgomery joining the cast in the second season. It follows Christopher Chance (Valley)–an ex-assassin–who is a private contractor that serves as a bodyguard and provides security for his clients. It was renewed for a second season in May 2010, with new showrunner Matt Miller replacing Steinberg. The series received generally positive reviews, with critics praising its action sequences and its use of comedy. Fox canceled the series after two seasons in May 2011.

== Synopsis ==
The series follows the life of San Francisco–based Christopher Chance (Mark Valley), a unique private contractor, bodyguard and security expert hired to protect his clients. Rather than taking on the target's identity himself (as in the comic book version), he protects his clients by completely integrating himself into their lives, to become a "human target". Chance is accompanied by business partner Winston (Chi McBride) and hired gun Guerrero (Jackie Earle Haley). Former client Ilsa Pucci (Indira Varma) becomes Chance's benefactor, while experienced thief Ames (Janet Montgomery) joins the team to seek redemption. Chance puts himself on the line to find the truth behind the mission. Even his own business partner Winston does not know what drove him towards this life, although it is explained in the first-season finale episode (which also explains about the name Christopher Chance itself).

== Cast and characters ==
From left to right: Guerrero, Ames, Chance, Pucci and Winston.

=== Main ===
- Mark Valley as Christopher Chance:
  An ex-assassin formerly employed by "The Old Man", who became a security specialist/private contractor/mercenary-for-hire helping those in need. He took the name from the previous Christopher Chance (Lee Majors). His real name is unknown. Abandoned as a child, Chance has a dark and mysterious past, beginning with his recruitment by "The Old Man" and training into one of the world's greatest assassins. Despite being given the Old Man's true name as his own (he is referred to as "Junior") and being selected to succeed him as leader of the organization, Chance instead broke ranks, fled, and taking up the name and mantle of Christopher Chance, started his life again. Officially, he is listed as "John Doe", with the name "Christopher Chance" amongst his many aliases.
- Chi McBride as Detective Laverne Winston:
  A former police inspector with the San Francisco Police Department who is now Chance's business partner. Winston left the force after the Katherine Walters mission "to do what was right. But no B.S.; no egos in the way". At the end of season one, he was in the custody of one of the Old Man's clients for secretly hiding a mysterious book they were after, with Chance and the Old Man working together again to get him back.
- Jackie Earle Haley as Guerrero:
  An ex-assassin formerly employed by the Old Man, who also went rogue alongside Chance after he was ordered to kill Katherine Walters when Chance refused to do it. Guerrero works as part of the team, and despite his complicated nature, cares greatly about Winston and Chance, considering the former a friend and secretly protecting the latter from the Old Man's agents. Outwardly, Guerrero appears weak and nerdy when in reality he is actually a highly intelligent, vicious, and deadly killer. Despite this, he is deeply loyal to his friends and a family man with a child of his own. He helps Chance and Winston in their missions by using his underworld contacts, as an accomplished computer hacker, and is also an expert in torturing people for information.
- Indira Varma as Ilsa Pucci (season 2):
  A sophisticated and recently widowed billionaire who becomes a benefactor to Chance to aid their protection agency.
- Janet Montgomery as Ames (season 2):
  A thief whose chameleon-like abilities allow her to blend into any situation. Winston, familiar with Ames from his days on the police force, offers her a job in an effort to help her get her life on the right track.

=== Recurring ===
- Emmanuelle Vaugier as FBI Special Agent Emma Barnes:
  After her career was tarnished by Chance's activities in "Embassy Row", Chance is able to get her help to stop Baptiste's assassination mission in "Baptiste". With Baptiste's arrest, Barnes' reputation is implied to have been restored. Barnes and Chance have complicated romantic feelings for each other.
- Autumn Reeser as Layla:
  A computer technician who was initially working for a corrupt defense contractor company Sentronics in "Lockdown", but after it was ruined by Chance, Layla was recruited to freelance for the team in "Baptiste".
- Leonor Varela as Maria Gallego:
  Chance's former girlfriend who asks for his help in "Salvage & Reclamation". They are reunited once again in "A Problem Like Maria" when she asks for his assistance again to rescue a friend of hers. She is also revealed to be married, a secret she keeps from him until they share their goodbyes.
- Lennie James as Baptiste:
  An assassin employed by The Old Man who previously worked with Chance, being his partner, student and friend. Baptiste is one of the world's greatest assassins; amoral, ruthless, incredibly efficient and deadly, but he owes all his skills to being trained by Chance. Baptiste did not take it well when Chance ran away, and even now struggles to understand. Baptiste is responsible for countless deaths, including the flawless hits of heads of state. Most notably, Baptiste killed Katherine Walters and the previous Christopher Chance as seen in "Christopher Chance". Baptiste's plan to destroy Operation Olive Branch, a secret UN peace summit, was foiled by Chance and Agent Barnes, and so Baptiste was taken into custody by the FBI in "Baptiste". "The Return of Baptiste" shows that he was transferred to a Russian gulag. He betrayed Chance after being recruited to assist the team in retrieving hostages taken by Don Miguel Cervantes. Baptiste asks to become Cervantes' head contract killer, before betraying Cervantes to save Chance. On returning from the mission Baptiste vows never to return to the Russian gulag as promised, but he is outsmarted by Chance yet again. He is also shown to collect his victims' watches.
- Armand Assante as The Old Man:
  The leader of an organization of professional mercenaries and assassins, his two favorite subordinates were Chance and Baptiste but, while he respects them both equally, he considered Chance his favorite and, becoming a surrogate father-figure to him, groomed him to be his successor, to the point he gave him his own name as Chance's - and when Chance ran and disappeared, taking the name "Christopher Chance", it was said to have "broken his heart". He seeks to re-recruit Chance back into his organization. His reputation for ruthlessness is so great Chance admitted the Old Man was the one person he is afraid of.
- Tony Hale as Harry:
  A private investigator who assists Chance and the team.

== Production ==
Fox announced in 2009 that Human Target would premiere mid-season. The show was filmed in Vancouver, British Columbia.

Human Target was renewed for a second season in May 2010. Matt Miller took over as showrunner from Jon E. Steinberg who remained part of the production team as an executive producer. Warner Bros. had contacted Miller to take a look at the first season and give his opinions on what changes he would make to the show.

The show was officially canceled on May 10, 2011.

=== Casting ===
In the original concept, Jackie Earle Haley's character Guerrero was intended to have a one-time appearance in the pilot episode, and every episode thereafter would feature a different character assisting Chance and Winston, but the producers liked Haley's performance and his character, and invited the actor to be a regular on the series.

=== Music ===
Composer Bear McCreary scored the music for the first season, for which he received an Emmy Award nomination for Outstanding Main Title Theme Music. He wanted to create a modern classic-adventure score", and a heroic but still fun and iconic theme for Chance. Chance's theme later became the opening theme for the first season. McCreary wrote around 30 minutes of full orchestral music for 11 weeks in a row, which was performed by an average of 60 musicians. The score for the final episode of the season, "Christopher Chance", was performed by a total of 94 musicians, making it the largest live orchestra ever assembled for a television series. McCreary was not asked back for the second season as they could no longer afford a weekly 40-person orchestra. Chuck composer Tim Jones took over the role.

== Broadcast ==
The series premiered in Canada on CTV on January 15, 2010, and began airing on Fox two days later. The first three episodes aired in various time slots on Fox; it premiered on Sunday at 8:00 pm ET; the second episode aired Wednesday at 9:00 pm ET; and the third episode aired Tuesday at 9:00 pm ET before relocating to its regular time slot for the remainder of the season, Wednesday at 8:00 pm ET. The first seasons' finale aired April 11, 2010 in Canada and three days later in the U.S. The second season was due to premiere on September 24, 2010 but later delayed to October 1, airing in a new time slot, Fridays at 8:00 pm ET. Instead of airing the season premiere Fox aired a rerun of Human Target and moved the show back to Wednesdays, taking Lie to Me's time-slot, which had moved to Mondays due to the cancellation of Lone Star. The second season premiered November 17, 2010 on Fox and originally aired Wednesdays at 8:00 pm ET. In January 2011, back-to-back episodes aired on January 5 and 14. Due to network coverage of the Tucson memorial service, the two scheduled episodes did not air in the United States on Fox, but they aired in Canada on A. The episodes were rescheduled and aired on January 14, 2011 on Fox. The next scheduled episode to air on January 26 was to be delayed and aired January 31, airing Monday at 8:00 pm ET. The final two episodes of the season aired on February 2 and 9, airing in another new timeslot, Wednesdays at 9:00 pm. Fox canceled the series on May 10, 2011.

In Australia, Human Target premiered on GO! on August 18, 2010. A week later it premiered in New Zealand on TV2.

In the UK, it premiered on Syfy on April 14, 2010. The second season was also broadcast on Syfy, and premiered on May 26, 2011.

== Episodes ==
Season	Episodes	Originally released	
Season	Episodes	First released	Last released
1	12	January 15, 2010	April 11, 2010
2	13	November 17, 2010	February 9, 2011

=== Season 1 (2010) ===
No. overall	No. in season	Title	Directed by	Written by	Original CTV air date	Original Fox air date	Prod. code	U.S. viewers (millions)
1	1	"Pilot"	Simon West	Jonathan E. Steinberg	January 15, 2010	January 17, 2010	296758	10.12
An ex-bank-employee takes the bank hostage; when he agrees to release the bystanders he finds that his main victim, Lydecker, is replaced by Chance. After the attempted murder of Stephanie Dobbs (Tricia Helfer), the designer of a Californian bullet train, she hires Chance to protect her. He poses as her Japanese-English translator. Chance accompanies her on the train's first voyage – a three-hour trip from San Francisco to Los Angeles. When an attempted poisoning is spotted by Chance, the killer, dressed as a waiter, takes a more direct approach. Chance is able to fight him off and kill him. Meanwhile, Guerrero and Winston discover that Dobbs used to have a relationship with reporter Mark Hoffer, to whom Dobbs anonymously leaked damaging information about the train manufacturer. Dobb's husband knew about the affair, but waited to kill her until she finished designing the train so that he could receive the financial bonus for its completion.
2	2	"Rewind"	Steve Boyum	Robert Levine	January 18, 2010	January 20, 2010	2J5154	10.46
Chance is hired by Tennant (Alessandro Juliani) to protect a hacker (Ali Liebert) that is flying over to meet him. The hacker, who goes by the screen name Casper discovered 'the skeleton key' to the internet, a means to bypass all security, but Chance only knows the flight and has no way of reaching her. Chance disguised as Martin Gill, a passenger, boards the plane along with Winston disguised as a flight attendant to identify both hacker and assassin. Chance subdues the assassin but shots fired in the struggle rupture a fuel tank and expose wiring, creating a fire in the planes conduits. A Sky Marshal handcuffs Chance. With the plane on fire and the pilot out, Chance, with the help of a flight attendant, Laura (Courtney Ford), subdue the Air Marshal and flip the plane upside down to direct the heavier airstream above the plane through the conduit and blow out the fire. When the plane is upside down the flight computer freezes. Casper proposes to replace the computer with her laptop, but it must be patched in manually and the flight computer is at the bottom of the plane. Chance and Laura crawl into the fuselage and connect the laptop. Laura reaches for her concealed gun (as she was the second kidnapper) but Chance already swiped it off her. While the plane is turning Laura attacks Chance and attempts to push him out of the plane, he injects her with Ketamine and she falls out the plane. Meanwhile, Guerrero, with help from Sergei (Sean Owen Roberts), discover who hired the kidnappers. Casper makes it safely to Tennant.
3	3	"Embassy Row"	Steve Boyum	Matthew Federman & Stephen Scaia	January 25, 2010	January 26, 2010	2J5152	9.26
Chance races against time and crashes a black-tie affair at the Russian Embassy to find a friend's killer. As he becomes embroiled in an international arms deal, he meets his match in a beautiful female counterpart Emma Barnes (Emmanuelle Vaugier).
4	4	"Sanctuary"	Sanford Bookstaver	Kalinda Vazquez	February 1, 2010	February 3, 2010	2J5155	7.80
Chance needs a miracle to help protect a reformed thief from his vengeful former accomplices as they race to recover priceless religious artifacts hidden in a remote monastery in northeastern Quebec.
5	5	"Run"	Kevin Hooks	Jonathan E. Steinberg	February 8, 2010	February 10, 2010	2J5151	8.91
Chance is hired to protect a district attorney who is running from her family's past and marked for murder because of her investigation into an organized crime family. Chance battles against rogue San Francisco police detectives out to assassinate the attorney in the course of protecting her.
6	6	"Lockdown"	Jon Cassar	Josh Schaer	February 15, 2010	February 17, 2010	2J5156	7.14
Chance is hired by the father of a weapons designer for a top secret defense company because they are holding his son hostage. The company fears their prized weapons engineer might whistleblow on them for covering up a situation involving the Burmese government using one of their secret weapons to crush dissent. The company killed the man's partner and it seems apparent they will kill him also after he completes his current task. Chance's goal is to sneak the engineer out of the highly-secured facility with no one noticing. The company's heads decide to cut their losses and use every effort to make certain that their employee does not leave the building alive. Chance's ID is sent to a mysterious location after a computer signal bounces across several different continents. It is implied in the end of the episode by Guerrero that the signal belongs to Chance's yet unnamed "old boss", who has been hunting him down for years. Now, Chance's ex-boss is one step closer to finding him.
7	7	"Salvage & Reclamation"	Bryan Spicer	Jonathan E. Steinberg & Robert Levine	March 10, 2010	March 10, 2010	2J5157	7.83
Chance is reunited with an old flame when he goes to South America to rescue an archeologist being targeted by a deadly bounty hunter, but all is not as it seems, for his ex has changed her allegiances.
8	8	"Baptiste"	Paul A. Edwards	Matthew Federman & Stephen Scaia	March 14, 2010	March 17, 2010	2J5158	8.01
Chance’s past comes into focus when he recruits FBI Agent Emma Barnes to help him stop his former partner, an assassin named "Baptiste", from assassinating a visiting foreign dignitary. Meanwhile, Guerrero tests out a familiar face as a new recruit to the team.
9	9	"Corner Man"	Steve Boyum	Jonathan E. Steinberg & Robert Levine	March 21, 2010	March 24, 2010	2J5159	6.80
Chance enters the ring as a prize fighter in Belgium in order to make an underworld figure lose. In the course of his investigation, Chance meets up Eva Kahn (Grace Park), the daughter of a prize fighter before he died.
10	10	"Tanarak"	Kevin Hooks	Mike Ostrowski	March 28, 2010	March 31, 2010	2J5153	8.23
Chance travels to a remote Alaskan island to find a missing doctor (Moon Bloodgood) and expose an industrial giant’s involvement in the death of a mining foreman after mercenaries were sent to kill her.
11	11	"Victoria"	Paul A. Edwards	Story by : Zak Schwartz; Teleplay by : Kalinda Vasquez & Sonny Postiglione	April 4, 2010	April 7, 2010	2J5160	7.73
Chance is hired to protect Victoria, Princess of Wales (Christina Cole) whose decision to seek a divorce to marry a commoner has her marked for assassination by her corrupt Royalty Protection bodyguards. Forced to take on the Royal Family's "Cleaner", Chance and the Princess are forced to seek help from an ex-IRA guerrilla, who had previously placed two bounties on Victoria's head.
12	12	"Christopher Chance"	Steve Boyum	Jonathan E. Steinberg & Robbie Thompson	April 11, 2010	April 14, 2010	2J5161	7.24
When clients of Chance's old boss capture and question him about an old assignment when he was an assassin, Chance, Winston and Guerrero recall the events that led up to their unlikely partnership including Chance's meeting Katherine (Amy Acker), whose death drove him to adopt his current profession. Lee Majors appears as the preceding man to adopt the Christopher Chance alias as well.

=== Season 2 (2010–11) ===
No. overall	No. in season	Title	Directed by	Written by	Original release date	Prod. code	U.S. viewers (millions)
13	1	"Ilsa Pucci"	Steve Boyum	Matt Miller	November 17, 2010	2J5701	6.59
Following Winston's kidnapping, Chance and Guerrero plan his rescue. Following the success of the rescue at a bank, Chance retires from the protection business. Six months later he is found in Nepal and approached by billionaire philanthropist Ilsa Pucci, who wants to hire him following the mysterious death of her husband Marshall Pucci, fearing someone is after her. Chance eventually gets out of retirement to help her, but she is later kidnapped during an evening event. Meanwhile, Winston and Guerrero catch Ames, a master thief who stole Ilsa's ring. Ames later admits that she was instructed to do so by Ilsa's kidnapper, who is revealed to be her lawyer. Chance and the team track them to a bank in Geneva. Chance is able to stop the assailants and escape from them. In the end, Ilsa wants Chance to work for her, and in exchange they will have access to funds to help his clients.
14	2	"The Wife's Tale"	Mimi Leder	Andrea Newman & Zev Borow	November 24, 2010	2J5702	5.54
Chance is contacted by Donnelly (M. C. Gainey) who tells him that Rebecca Brooks (Molly Parker), the wife of a man he assassinated seven years earlier, is a target. Chance pretends to be her date from an online dating service to get her to safety, but her real date, "Kevin" (Adrian Hein), shows up and turns out to be the assassin. Rebecca takes off and Chance follows her and drives off with her when the assassin starts shooting at her. They figure out that he must have been killed over a theory which she wants to complete, but he shipped his papers from the university to a family home in Tiburon. Meanwhile, Guerrero and Ames figure out that a lawyer from a private investment bank ordered the hit, and that Daniel Brooks used to blackmail the firm. Brooks realizes that the theory can be applied to manipulating the stock market. Chance confesses that he killed her husband and she shoots him in the shoulder and runs away. The assassin shows up and he and Chance fight, Chance wins. Rebecca pulls a gun on Chance, Donnelly disarms Rebecca and is about to shoot Chance as Winston shoots him.
15	3	"Taking Ames"	Paul A. Edwards	David Simkins	December 1, 2010	2J5703	5.78
Chance follows Ames after she stole some of Guerrero's tools, and confronts her after she and Brody Rivera (J. D. Pardo) steal explosives. When Rivera delivers the explosives to Mr. Markus (Hakeem Kae-Kazim) he is presented the score of a lifetime, which is to steal three massive diamonds, but they need Ames for the heist. After they leave Ames calls Chance and asks for help. Chance infiltrates the team by pretending to be Mr. Chicago, while Guerrero intercepted the real Chicago (Mike Dopud). The team breaks into the museum. Chance takes out the members of the team, including Yuri (Douglas O'Keeffe) another cleaner. Rivera spots him and drives off with the van, but Ames lifted the diamonds off him. Markus phones Ames telling her to bring the diamonds to the train station or Rivera dies. She places the diamonds in a locker, after Markus leaves with them he gives Rivera's location, Winston, Guerrero stop him and the real Mr. Chicago drives off with Markus. Rivera sits on a bomb with a pressure switch, Chance tackles him off the bench clear of the explosion. Pucci admits that Ames is loyal and accepts her back on the team.
16	4	"The Return of Baptiste"	Bryan Spicer	Jonathan E. Steinberg & Robert Levine	December 8, 2010	2J5704	5.64
A journalist friend of Ilsa, Susan Connors, is kidnapped by Miguel Cervantes. In an effort to find and rescue her, Chance is forced to turn to Baptiste, who once worked with Cervantes, and is in a Siberian prison. Under Chance's guard the two travel to Paraguay and are quickly met by resistance. When they meet Cervantes, Baptiste appears to betray Chance by offering his services to Cervantes. An imprisoned Chance finds Connors and they break free. Baptiste assists in allowing the two to escape. Meanwhile, Winston and Guerrero and Ilsa work to release her plane from the Paraguayan army. They succeed just as Chance, Baptiste and Connors arrive at flee the country. Baptiste reveals he has no intention of going back to prison, but Chance manages to drug his drink beforehand, and he is returned to Siberia.
17	5	"Dead Head"	Paul A. Edwards	Story by : Tom Spezialy; Teleplay by : Dan E. Fesman & Nora Zuckerman & Lilla Zuckerman	December 15, 2010	2J5705	5.82
When a client's (Roger Bart) amnesia prevents him from remembering his identity—and knowing who might want him dead—Winston is forced to ask his ex-wife (Tracie Thoms) for help.
18	6	"The Other Side of the Mall"	Peter Lauer	Zev Borow	December 22, 2010	2J5708	5.75
The team travels to a suburb during the holiday season as they go undercover to try and figure out why a seemingly innocent family was a target of a murder attempt.
19	7	"A Problem Like Maria"	Guy Ferland	Dan McDermott & Andrea Newman	January 5, 2011	2J5706	6.18
Chance and Ilsa's partnership is tested when his former girlfriend (Leonor Varela) requests his help to rescue a colleague of hers who is held captive by a South American dictator.
20	8	"Communication Breakdown"	Steve Boyum	Jonathan E. Steinberg	January 5, 2011	2J5707	6.49
Winston, Guerrero and Ames must save inept private investigator Harry (Tony Hale) when he blows his case making him a target. Meanwhile, Ilsa and Chance's plane is shot down by a man seeking revenge.
21	9	"Imbroglio"	Steve Boyum	Robert Levine	January 12, 2011 (CTV); January 14, 2011	2J5709	4.69
Chance and Ilsa try to protect her sister-in-law (Olga Sosnovska) when a hostage situation develops at the opera.
22	10	"Cool Hand Guerrero"	Craig R. Baxley	Matt Whitney	January 12, 2011 (CTV); January 14, 2011	2J5710	4.80
When Guerrero is framed for a friend's murder and ends up in jail, Chance is forced to break him out.
23	11	"Kill Bob"	John Terlesky	Brad Kern & Zev Borow	January 31, 2011	2J5711	7.75
Chance believes a man's wife is a Russian spy who is trying to kill him and steal classified military information. Meanwhile, Ames tries to keep a secret from Winston and Guerrero discovers a secret file on Marshall Pucci.
24	12	"The Trouble with Harry"	Peter Lauer	Jonathan E. Steinberg & Robert Levine	February 2, 2011	2J5712	9.22
Chance reunites with inept private investigator Harry when the girlfriend of the owner of a rival security firm needs protection. Meanwhile, Ilsa faces her first field mission and two members of the team get closer. At the end of the episode, Ilsa and Chance discuss a photo of Marshall and his possible mistress, and share a kiss.
25	13	"Marshall Pucci"	David Barrett	Matt Miller & Heather V. Regnier	February 9, 2011	2J5713	8.13
Ilsa plans to move back to London, but Guerrero finds Marshall's (Steven Brand) supposed mistress, Julia (Emily Foxler). Ilsa tries to help Julia, who was not Marshall's mistress but a worker for him. Julia isolates Ilsa from the team and tries to kill her on a subway, telling Ilsa that she killed Marshall. Ilsa escapes but Julia returns to a rogue CIA agent, who infiltrates the teams office. They run: Guerrero returns to the office to stop the CIA from hurting his son. Meanwhile, Chance, Ilsa, and Ames go to a hotel Marshall and Ilsa visited a lot and find evidence that could end the hostilities, but when Ilsa finds out that Julia is present, she takes her hostage to the roof. Chance climbs up and finds that Ilsa can't shoot Julia, and the CIA arrives. Chance and Ilsa jump off the building, but grab onto a gargoyle to hold themselves up as Ames and Winston arrive and order the rogue SOG operatives to surrender, which they do. Guerrero kills the agent with a car bomb. Winston promises Ilsa to send the file she found to the appropriate parties. Ilsa once again tries to move back to London. Chastised by Winston, Chance drives to the airport and asks her to stay, but she had already cancelled her flight plans. She stays in San Francisco with the team.

== Home media ==
Human Target (Original Television Soundtrack — Season 1)

Soundtrack album by Bear McCreary
- Released: October 8, 2010 (2-disc set); October 22, 2010 (3-disc set)
- Genre: Television soundtrack
- Length: 2:37:36 (2-disc set); 3:24:48 (3-disc set)
- Labels: WaterTower Music (2-disc set); La-La Land Records (3-disc set)

=== DVD and Blu-ray ===
Human Target – The Complete 1st Season was released as a widescreen three-disc region 1 DVD box set as well as a two-disc region free Blu-ray version on September 21, 2010. In addition to the 12 episodes of the season, which have an enhanced audio mix, a number of extras are included; several unaired and deleted scenes, an audio commentary by Mark Valley, Chi McBride, Jonathan E. Steinberg and Peter Johnson for the pilot episode and two featurettes; "Human Target: Full Contact Television" and "Human Target: Confidential Informant". The set received a rating of 4.5 out of 5 from Blu-ray.com, with concerns expressed that "squeezing twelve episodes onto two discs takes a bit of a toll" and caused some artifacting. The site also questioned the use of a lossy 640 kbit/s audio track and the small number of special features, calling it "a tad pricey for twelve episodes". By contrast, DVD Verdict said that the DVD's gave "a better-than average offering of supplements".

=== Soundtrack ===
A two-disc soundtrack containing 43 tracks composed by Bear McCreary for the first season was released by WaterTower Music on October 8, 2010. A limited three-disc soundtrack with an additional 20 tracks was released on October 22 the same year by La-La Land Records.

Disc 1
No.	Title	Length
1.	"Theme from Human Target (Long Version)"	1:32
2.	"Skydive"	5:20
3.	"No Threats"	4:17
4.	"Military Camp Rescue"	4:37
5.	"Motorcycle Escape"	5:29
6.	"Monastery in the Mountains"	1:41
7.	"Paint a Bullseye"	2:19
8.	"The Katherine Walters File"	4:30
9.	"Switching Sides"	6:10
10.	"This Is Awkward"	2:12
11.	"The Russian Embassy"	3:32
12.	"The Devil's Mouth"	1:21
13.	"Ice Cubes"	2:05
14.	"Allyson's Past"	3:05
15.	"Flipping the Plane"	10:54
16.	"Driving Away"	0:48
17.	"Airborne and Lethal"	3:34
18.	"Chance's Old Boss"	3:54
19.	"Old Chance"	2:15
20.	"Skyhook Rescue"	7:05
21.	"Into the West"	1:35
Total length:		78:15

Disc 2
No.	Title	Length
1.	"New York City Arrival"	1:52
2.	"Train Fight"	3:33
3.	"Baptiste"	2:39
4.	"Tango Fight"	1:27
5.	"Maria and Chance"	2:35
6.	"Katherine's Killer"	4:10
7.	"Confronting Baptiste"	8:51
8.	"Courthouse Brawl"	5:09
9.	"Stop Running"	3:08
10.	"Not a Pacifist"	0:46
11.	"Bullet Train"	1:57
12.	"Gondola"	8:44
13.	"An Old Life"	3:21
14.	"Lockdown"	5:02
15.	"A Bottle of Japanese Whiskey"	1:34
16.	"Victoria"	3:30
17.	"The New Champion"	5:56
18.	"Emma Barnes"	3:10
19.	"Stephanie's Ring"	1:51
20.	"Port Yard Deaths"	2:52
21.	"The New Christopher Chance"	6:34
22.	"Theme from Human Target (Short Version)"	0:40
Total length:		79:21

Disc 3
No.	Title	Length
1.	"Flight Attendant Wilson"	0:50
2.	"Round One"	3:25
3.	"Emma's Bra"	2:24
4.	"Maria Gallego"	1:59
5.	"Afraid in Alaska"	1:22
6.	"Guerrero and Sergei"	2:51
7.	"Chance Takes the Job"	0:55
8.	"Tracking Device"	3:04
9.	"The Black Room"	1:42
10.	"Fighting Kendrick Taylor"	1:28
11.	"Bertram"	7:00
12.	"Sparing Guerrero"	1:46
13.	"Scar Stories"	3:35
14.	"Danny's Killer"	2:42
15.	"Chaos in the Cockpit"	5:50
16.	"A Mistake"	0:51
17.	"Chance's Theme (Sketch Version 1)"	1:17
18.	"Chance's Theme (Sketch Version 2)"	1:44
19.	"Katherine's Theme (Solo Piano Version)"	1:49
20.	"Theme from Human Target (Alternate Short Version)"	0:38
Total length:		47:12

== Reception ==
=== Critical reception ===
The series premiere of Human Target received generally favorable reviews, scoring 69 out of 100 on Metacritic based on 26 critical reviews. On Rotten Tomatoes, the season has an approval rating of 62% with an average rating of 6.8 out of 10 based on 29 reviews. The website's critics consensus states, "Human Target is frequently preposterous, but this slam-bang action series also offers a solid mix of comedy and thrills". The New York Post stated that "because he's a human target, he has no problem blowing out of exploding buildings (of which there are too many to count) with nary a scratch. Think Jack Bauer with excellent grooming". Robert Bianco wrote of the show's premiere in USA Today that the "confined-spaces fight on the train is a miniature marvel of its kind". Not all reviews were positive. Cynthia Fuchs gave the show a 3 out of 10, calling it predictable and the characters uninteresting.

The second-season premiere received similar favorable reviews, scoring slightly higher than the first season with 71 out of 100 on Metacritic based on 13 reviews. On Rotten Tomatoes, the season has an approval rating of 88% with an average rating of 7.2 out of 10 based on 24 reviews. The website's critics consensus states: "Action-packed sequences and the addition of two central female characters give Human Target's second season a necessary boost". Brian Lowry from Variety criticized the changes made to the second season believing that the producers were forced to give the show an overhaul by the network to make it more appealing to women. He believes the changes almost ruined the show for those who loved the first season, but he said "for all that, there are still some good moments in these early hours, and the stuntwork remains impressive". He was also happy to see the scheduling changes keeping the show away from the Friday night death slot. Some reviewers wondered what happened to the original theme music, with Ian Cullen going as far as to say that "the change of music in the opening title sequence just plain sucked".

=== Viewership ===
In the U.S. the series premiere attracted 10.12 million viewers, and dropped to 7.24 million viewers for the season finale. The first season averaged on 8.26 million viewers and became 48th in viewers. In Canada the premiere was watched by 1.26 million people, ranking 21st in that week.

The second season continued the drop in viewers and premiered to 6.59 million viewers. Viewership increased for the final three episodes of the second season, when the show aired in special time slots. Notably, episode 12 which aired after American Idol, received 9.3 million viewers, a season-high, and the best ratings the series has had since the beginning of the first season.

=== Awards and nominations ===
In 2010 Human Target was nominated for three Emmy Awards. Stunt coordinator Dean Choe received a nomination for "Outstanding Stunt Coordination" for the fifth episode "Run", Bear McCreary for "Outstanding Original Main Title Theme Music" and Karin Fong, Jeremy O. Cox and Cara McKenney for "Outstanding Main Title Design".
