= Human Target =

The Human Target
- Christopher Chance, as he appeared on the cover of Human Target #6 (November 2021). Art by Greg Smallwood.

Publication information
- Publisher: DC Comics
- First appearance: (Fred Venable); Detective Comics #201 (November 1953) (Christopher Chance); Action Comics #419 (December 1972)
- Created by: (Fred Venable); Edmond Hamilton; Sheldon Moldoff (Christopher Chance); Len Wein; Carmine Infantino

In-story information
- Alter ego: Fred Venable; Christopher Chance
- Notable aliases: Numerous identities Impersonates his clients to protect them
- Abilities: Master impersonator; Exceptional athlete; Skilled detective, marksman, and martial artist

The Human Target is the name of two characters in American comic books published by DC Comics. The first is Fred Venable, while the second is private investigator and bodyguard Christopher Chance who assumes the identities of clients targeted by assassins and other dangerous criminals. Chance has been in numerous books published throughout the decades and has also appeared in television adaptations.

Chance has appeared in two self-titled TV series in 1992 and 2010, portrayed by Rick Springfield and Mark Valley respectively, and made guest appearances in the Arrowverse TV series Arrow, portrayed by Wil Traval.

== Publication history ==
The first character to use the "Human Target" title (Fred Venable) appeared in Detective Comics #201 (November 1953), and was created by Edmond Hamilton and Sheldon Moldoff.

The second character to use the "Human Target" title (Christopher Chance) first appeared in Action Comics #419 (December 1972) and was created by Len Wein and Carmine Infantino. Later, the feature appeared in Batman titles such as The Brave and the Bold and Detective Comics. He starred in a limited series, a one-shot, and then an ongoing series written by Peter Milligan and published under DC's Vertigo imprint. In 2021, Tom King and Greg Smallwood began a 12-issue limited series for DC's Black Label imprint.

=== Comic listing ===
Comic book appearances
Date	Issue	Title
1953 November	Detective Comics #201	"The Human Target"
1958 January	Gangbusters #61	"The Human Target"
1972 December	Action Comics #419	"The Assassin-Express Contract"
1973 January	Action Comics #420	"The King of the Jungle Contract"
1973 March	Action Comics #422	"The Shadows-of-Yesterday Contract"
1973 April	Action Comics #423	"The Deadly Dancer Contract"
1973 July	Action Comics #425	"The Short-Walk-to-Disaster Contract -- Clause 1: I Have a Cousin in the Business"
1973 August	Action Comics #426	"The Short-Walk-to-Disaster Contract -- Clause 2: The Shortest Distance Between Two Points"
1973 November	Action Comics #429	"The Rodeo Riddle Contract"
1974 February	Action Comics #432	"The Million Dollar Methuselah Contract"
1978 September–October	DC The Brave and the Bold #143	"The Cat and the Canary Contract"
1978 October–November	DC The Brave and the Bold #144	"The Symphony For The Devil Contract"
1979 April–May	Detective Comics #483	"The Lights! Camera! Murder! Contract"
1979 June–July	Detective Comics #484	"The Who Is Floyd Fenderman Anyway? Contract"
1979 October–November	Detective Comics #486	"The Devil and the Deep Blue Sea Contract"
1980 August	Detective Comics #493	"The 18-Wheel War Contract"
1981 March	Detective Comics #500	"The 'Too Many Crooks...' Caper"
1982 June	Detective Comics #515	"College for Killers"
1982 July	Batman #349	"Blood Sport"
1982 September	Batman #351	"What Stalks the Gotham Night?"
1982 September	Detective Comics #518	"The Millionaire Contract"
1982 October	Batman #352	"The Killer Sky"
1982 November	DC The Best of Blue Ribbon Digest #30	"The Assassin-Express Contract" (reprint)
1986 February	Crisis on Infinite Earths #11	"Aftershock"
1989 March	Action Comics #641	"The Pow! Wap! Zam! Contract"
1991 November	Human Target Special #1	"The Human Target: The Mack Attack Contract"
Vertigo Comics
1999 April	Human Target (1999) #1	"Human Target, Part 1"
1999 May	Human Target (1999) #2	"Human Target, Part 2"
1999 June	Human Target (1999) #3	"Human Target, Part 3"
1999 July	Human Target (1999) #4	"Human Target, Part 4"
2002 May	Human Target (2002) OGN	"Final Cut"
2003 October	Human Target (2003) #1	"To Be Frank"
2003 November	Human Target (2003) #2	"The Unshredded Man, Part 1: Ground Zero"
2003 December	Human Target (2003) #3	"The Unshredded Man, Part 2: Ready to Die"
2004 January	Human Target (2003) #4	"Take Me Out To The Ballgame, Part One: The Set-Up Man"
2004 February	Human Target (2003) #5	"Take Me Out To The Ballgame, Part Two: The Strike Zone"
2004 March	Human Target (2003) #6	"For I Have Sinned"
2004 April	Human Target (2003) #7	"Which Way The Wind Blows, Part One: Living In Amerika"
2004 May	Human Target (2003) #8	"Which Way The Wind Blows, Part Two: American Terrorists"
2004 June	Human Target (2003) #9	"Which Way The Wind Blows, Part Three: Bringing It All Back Home"
2004 July	Human Target (2003) #10	"Five Days Grace"
2004 August	Human Target (2003) #11	"Games of Chance"
2004 September	Human Target (2003) #12	"Crossing The Border, Part One: Suffer the Children"
2004 October	Human Target (2003) #13	"Crossing The Border, Part Two: Hey, Jude"
2004 November	Human Target (2003) #14	"The Second Coming, Part One: In the Name of the Father"
2004 December	Human Target (2003) #15	"The Second Coming, Part Two: The Temptation of Christopher Chance"
2005 January	Human Target (2003) #16	"The Second Coming, Conclusion: Pieces of Lead"
2005 February	Human Target (2003) #17	"You Made Me Love You"
2005 March	Human Target (2003) #18	"Letters From the Front Line"
2005 April	Human Target (2003) #19	"The Stealer, Part One"
2005 May	Human Target (2003) #20	"The Stealer, Part Two"
2005 June	Human Target (2003) #21	"The Stealer, Part Three"
2010 June	Human Target Special Edition #1	"Human Target, Part 1" (1999/reprint)
Human Target (2010) tie-in
2010 April	Human Target (2010) #1	"Human Target #1"
2010 May	Human Target (2010) #2	"Human Target #2"
2010 June	Human Target (2010) #3	"Human Target #3"
2010 July	Human Target (2010) #4	"Human Target #4"
2010 August	Human Target (2010) #5	"Human Target #5"
2010 September	Human Target (2010) #6	"Human Target #6"
DC Black Label
2021 November	The Human Target (2021) #1	"When We Are Born"
2021 November	The Human Target (2021) #2	"We Cry"
2021 December	The Human Target (2021) #3	"That We Are Come"
2022 January	The Human Target (2021) #4	"To This Great Stage of Fools!"
2022 February	The Human Target (2021) #5	"This is a Good Block"
2022 March	The Human Target (2021) #6	"It Were a Delicate Stratagem"
2022 August	Tales of the Human Target #1	"Oh, Here He Is"
2022 September	The Human Target (2021) #7	"To Shoe a Troop of Horse with Felt"
2022 October	The Human Target (2021) #8	
2022 November	The Human Target (2021) #9	"And When I Have Stol'n Upon These Sons-In-Law"
2023 January	The Human Target (2021) #10	"Then Kill"
2023 January	The Human Target (2021) #11	"Kill Kill Kill Kill"
2023 February	The Human Target (2021) #12	"Kill"
2025 July	Resurrection Man: Quantum Karma (2025)	"My Shadow, Shedding Skin"
2025 August	Resurrection Man: Quantum Karma (2025)	"Just Who I Might Have Been"

== Vertigo ==
Writer Peter Milligan and Edvin Biukovic revived Christopher Chance in 1999, moving the character to DC Comics' Vertigo imprint for a four-issue limited series. The mini-series was followed by the graphic novel Human Target: Final Cut, as well as a series lasting 21 issues until its cancellation in 2005.

== Reception ==
The Human Target story "The Unshredded Man" was analyzed as an example of depictions of the September 11 attacks in American popular culture.

== In other media ==
- The Christopher Chance incarnation of the Human Target appears in a self-titled series (1992), portrayed by Rick Springfield. This version is a Vietnam War veteran in addition to being a private investigator and bodyguard who charges ten percent of a client's annual income to take their place. Additionally, he is assisted by eccentric computer genius Philo Marsden, who designs high-tech masks for Chance to use in conjunction with sophisticated makeup; Jeff Carlyle, the chauffeur, cook, and pilot for Chance's mobile base of operations, the Blackwing; and Lilly Page, an ex-CIA agent who helps coordinate Chance's missions.
  - Chance appears in the tie-in one-shot The Human Target Special #1.
- The Christopher Chance incarnation of the Human Target appears in a self-titled series (2010), portrayed by Mark Valley. This version is a former assassin who utilizes undistinguished cover identities that put him close to his clients rather than assuming their identity himself and is the fifth individual to take on the name "Christopher Chance", having inherited it from an unnamed guardian (portrayed by Lee Majors). Additionally, he is assisted by former police officer Winston, independent contractor Guerrero, financier Ilsa Pucci, and retired cat burglar Ames.
  - Chance appears in a tie-in comic miniseries, written by Len Wein and art by Bruno Redondo.
- The Christopher Chance incarnation of the Human Target appears in Arrow, portrayed by Wil Traval. This version is an old friend of John Diggle.
