= Vintage TV (Canada) =

Canadian television channel

- Country: Canada
- Broadcast area: National
- Headquarters: Toronto, Ontario

Programming
- Picture format: 480i (16:9 SDTV)

Ownership
- Owner: Vintage Entertainment Canada Limited

History
- Launched: October 20, 2016 (4 years ago)
- Closed: November 2018 (7 years ago)

Vintage TV was a Canadian English language exempt Category B specialty channel broadcasting music-related programming, including music videos, concerts, interviews, and more from an array of diverse genres including rock, pop, country, urban, blues, folk, and more, primarily dating from the 1940s to 1990s. Its name and majority of programming are licensed from the UK-based television channel, Vintage TV. The channel is owned by Vintage Entertainment Canada Limited, a consortium owned by Nathalia Browning Ribeiro, Koa Padolsky, Blue Wolverine Media and Arts Ltd., and Brain Dead Dog Productions Inc. all owning a 16.75% interest in the service, and Vintage Entertainment Limited, the parent company of the UK channel, owning a 33% interest.

== History ==
The channel launched in standard definition on October 20, 2016, on Shaw Cable and Shaw Direct in Canada, despite being previously listed on the Canadian Radio-television and Telecommunications Commission's (CRTC) website for launched exempted television services. The channel achieved wider coverage in June 2017, when it was added to Rogers Cable lineup.

After passing the 200,000 subscribers mark, Vintage TV was granted a CRTC broadcast license on January 23, 2018.

In August 2018, The UK channel was shut down after being dropped by all British service providers. This meant that the Canadian channel lost its only source to new programming.

Without warning, on September 29, 2018, the channel dropped all programming and became a de facto 24-hour infomercial for Sessions X, an on-demand video service, continually repeating the same programming and single commercial block which first aired on that day. In October 2018, the UK channel went into administration.

In November 2018 without warning, the channel stopped broadcasting. A Shaw-generated graphic has been shown in the channel's space on Shaw Cable & Direct. As of February 2019, Shaw's program guide has shown 'No Data'. The channel space once occupied by Vintage was removed from both Shaw and Rogers systems later that month.
