= Mark Valley =

American actor

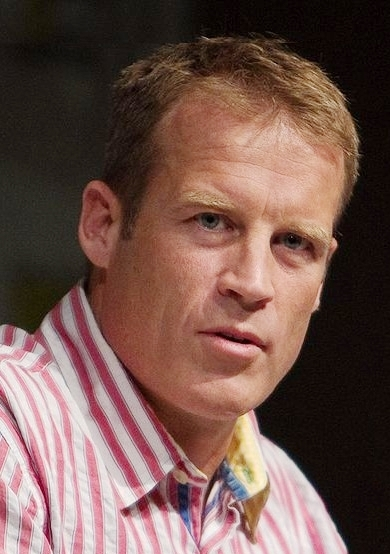
- Valley in 2010
- Born: Mark Valley; Ogdensburg, New York, U.S.
- Education: United States Military Academy (BS)
- Occupation: Actor
- Years active: 1993–present
- Spouse: Anna Torv (m. 2008, separated)
- Children: 1
- Military career
- Allegiance: United States
- Branch: United States Army
- Service years: 1987–1992
- Rank: First lieutenant
- Unit: 18th Engineer Brigade
- Conflicts: Gulf War: Operation Desert Storm

Mark Valley is an American actor. He is known for his roles as Brad Chase in the TV drama Boston Legal, Oliver Richard in the NBC drama Harry's Law, FBI Special Agent John Scott in the Fox sci fi series Fringe, Christopher Chance in Fox's action drama Human Target, and Tommy Sullivan in ABC's Body of Proof.

== Early life ==
Valley was born in Ogdensburg, New York. He is a 1987 graduate from the United States Military Academy in West Point, New York, with a degree in mathematics.

== Career ==
=== Military service ===
He served in Berlin, where he played rugby for the U.S. military team, The Berlin Yanks Rugby Football Club. Valley saw action in Operation Desert Storm as platoon commander detailed from the 18th Engineer Brigade to the 73rd Engineer Company, 3-2 Air Defense Artillery Battalion, 7th Transportation Group.

=== Acting ===
Valley obtained his first role, on The Innocent (1993), while serving in the U.S. Army in Germany. He landed the role of "Father Pete" on Another World in 1993. He later took over the role of Jack Deveraux on the NBC Daytime soap opera Days of Our Lives from 1994 to 1997. In the 2000 romantic comedy The Next Best Thing he portrayed Rupert Everett's on-screen lover. In 2003, Valley played Detective Eddie Arlette, an American police officer in London, on the short-lived Keen Eddie.

He played Brad Chase on Boston Legal, a spinoff of the television series The Practice. Valley also appeared on the television series ER as Richard Lockhart, Abby Lockhart's ex-husband. In 2008 he appeared on Fringe, as FBI agent John Scott. Valley played the lead in Fox's drama Human Target.

In 2012, Valley joined ABC's Body of Proof as a series regular. He played Det. Tommy Sullivan, Dana Delany's love interest. He also co-starred alongside Delany in her short-lived series Pasadena in 2001.

== Personal life ==
He has a daughter born in 1987. He married Australian actress Anna Torv, his Fringe co-star, in December 2008. In April 2010, it was reported that the couple had split several months earlier.

== Filmography ==
Film
Year	Title	Role	Notes
1993	The Innocent	Tunnel Technician	
1997	Breast Men	Fair Haired Resident	
1998	Some Girl	Police Officer	
1998	The Siege	FBI Agent Mike Johanssen	
2000	The Next Best Thing	Cardiologist	
2000	Jericho	Jericho	
2001	Big Time	Chazz	
2007	Live!	Blair	uncredited
2007	Shrek the Third	Cyclops	Voice
2012	Stolen	Agent Fletcher	
2012	Zero Dark Thirty	C-130 Pilot	
2013	Batman: The Dark Knight Returns: Part 2	Clark Kent / Superman	Voice
2015	Lost Boy	Greg Harris	
2017	Gun Shy	Ben Harding	
2018	Garrow	Mr. Bell	
2025	Bride Hard	Edgar	

Television
Year	Title	Role	Notes
1993	Another World	Father Pete	
1994	Vanishing Son IV	Adams	
1994–1997	Days of Our Lives	Jack Deveraux #4	37 episodes
1997	George Wallace	Bobby Kennedy	
1999	Brimstone	Barry Ceneazo	
2000	Diagnosis: Murder	Captain Paul Davis	
2000	Running Mates	Dick Tracy	
2000–2001	Once and Again	Will Gluck	5 episodes
2000–2003	ER	Richard Lockhart	5 episodes
2001	CSI: Crime Scene Investigation	Jack Willman	
2001	The Lone Gunmen	Henry Farst	
2001	Gideon's Crossing	Mark Epperson	
2001–2002	Pasadena	Robert Greeley	Series regular, 13 episodes
2002	Spin City	Joseph	1 episode
2003–2004	Keen Eddie	Detective Eddie Arlette	Series regular, 13 episodes
2004	Harry Green and Eugene	Harry Green	
2004	The 4400	Warren Lytell	2 episodes
2004	I'm with Her	Jack Campbell	
2004–2007	Boston Legal	Brad Chase	Series regular, 70 episodes
2006–2008	Emily's Reasons Why Not	Reese Callahan	2 episodes
2007	Business Class	Matt	
2007	Law & Order: Special Victims Unit	Jake Keegan	1 episode
2008	Swingtown	Brad Davis	3 episodes
2008–2009	Fringe	John Scott	Series regular, 12 episodes
2010–2011	Human Target	Christopher Chance	Series regular, 25 episodes
2011–2012	Harry's Law	Oliver Richard	Series regular, 22 episodes
2013	Body of Proof	Tommy Sullivan	Series regular, 13 episodes
2013	Stuttgart Homicide	John McDuff	1 episode
2014	Crisis	CIA Director Widener	8 episodes
2014–2015	CSI: Crime Scene Investigation	Private Investigator Daniel Shaw	8 episodes
2015–2016	Girlfriends' Guide to Divorce	Dr. Harris	7 episodes
2016	Hawaii Five-0	Special Agent Frank Zagar	1 episode
2017	Feud: Bette and Joan	Gary Merrill	1 episode
2017	Bloodline	Mike Gallagher	1 episode
2017	Wisdom of the Crowd	Dino Hutton, U.S. Deputy Marshal	1 episode
2018	The Flash	Anton Slater	1 episode
2018	Another Time	Ben	
2018	ZBurg	Harry Mallette	Pilot
2018	The Romanoffs	Steve Lewis	1 episode
2019	Emma Fielding: More Bitter Than Death	Duncan Thatcher	TV movie
2019-2022	Blood & Treasure	Patrick McNamara	3 episodes

== Awards and nominations ==
Boston Legal role

- Nominated — Screen Actors Guild Awards for Outstanding Performance by an Ensemble in a Comedy Series shared with René Auberjonois, Ryan Michelle Bathe, Candice Bergen, Julie Bowen, Justin Mentell, Rhona Mitra, Monica Potter, William Shatner, and James Spader (2006)
- Nominated — Screen Actors Guild Awards for Outstanding Performance by an Ensemble in a Drama Series shared with René Auberjonois, Candice Bergen, Craig Bierko, Julie Bowen, William Shatner, and James Spader (2007)
- Nominated — Screen Actors Guild Awards for Outstanding Performance by an Ensemble in a Drama Series shared with René Auberjonois, Candice Bergen, Julie Bowen, Saffron Burrows, Christian Clemenson, Taraji P. Henson, John Larroquette, William Shatner, James Spader, Tara Summers, Gary Anthony Williams, and Constance Zimmer (2008)

Keen Eddie role

- Nominated — Teen Choice Award for Choice TV Breakout Star — Male (2003)

Human Target role

- Nominated — Teen Choice Award for Choice TV Actor — Action (2010)

== Radio and podcast appearances ==
- Valley appeared on Ken Reid's TV Guidance Counselor podcast on September 14, 2016.
