= Steevi Bacon =

Musician from London, England

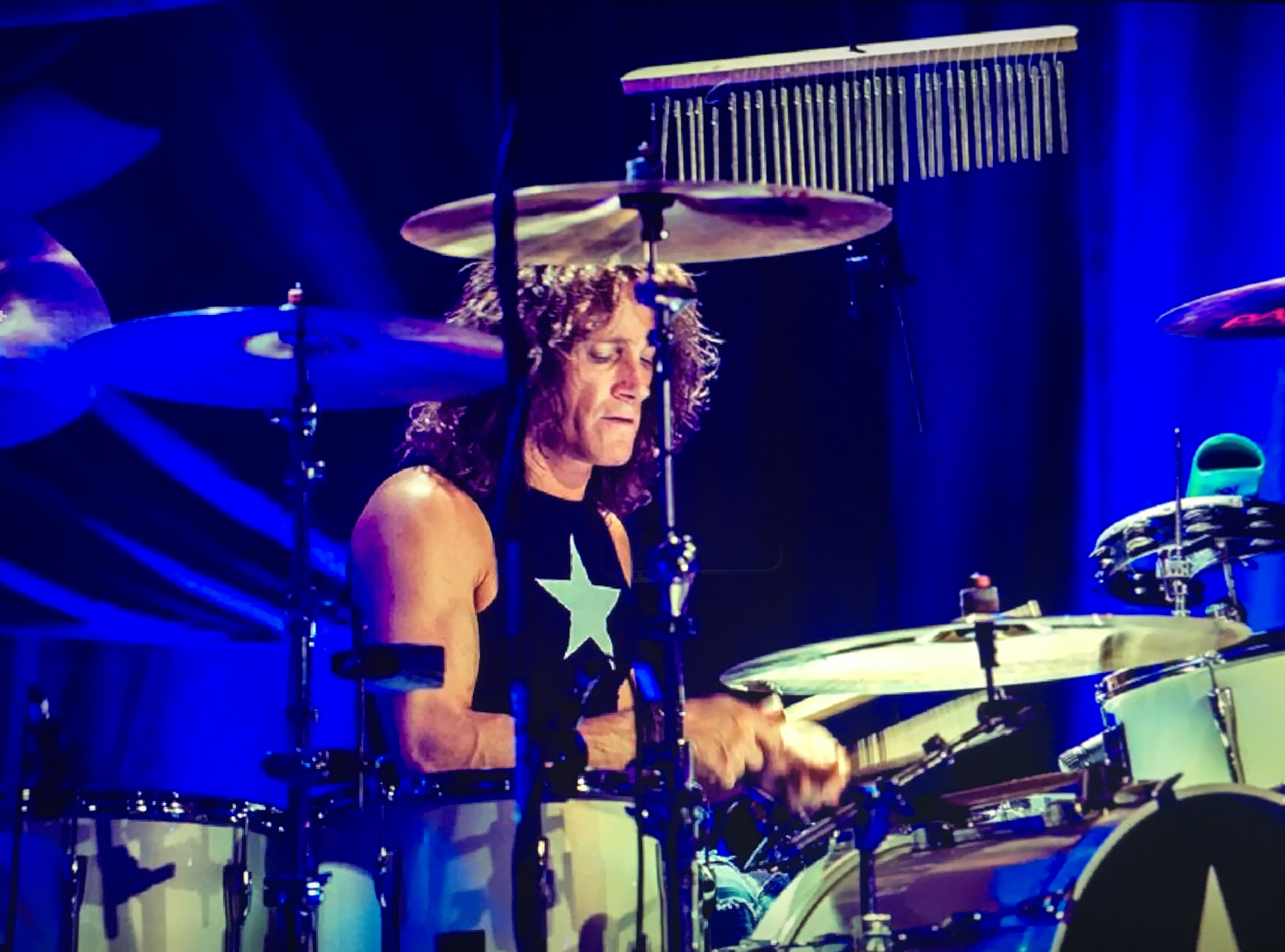

Background information
- Origin: London, England
- Genres: Rock; power pop
- Occupations: musician; music programmer; graphic designer; drum tutoring/mentoring
- Instruments: Drums, Percussion, Backing Vocals
- Years active: 1987–present
- Label: Cherry Red Records
- Member of: Cats in Space
- Website: https://www.steevi.com/

Steevi Bacon is a musician from London, England. He is co-founder member and drummer for the UK based power pop rock band Cats in Space, established May 2015 with guitarist Greg Hart, and their fellow songwriting partner Mick Wilson of British 70s phenomenon 10cc.

He has also recorded at Queen's Mountain recording studios in Montreux, Switzerland completing many unlisted sessions for producer David Richards, and has also played drums on two transatlantic guitar legend Robin Trower albums, Go My Way and Another Day's Blues.

Currently touring with CATS in SPACE, recently completed ten date sellout tour March 2017 with UK rock legends THUNDER with final date at London's Eventim Apollo. The band also guested at Hyde Park BST on 30 June 2017 as opener to headliners Blondie and Phil Collins and many other original 20th century artistes. 12 August 2017 saw the band appear in front of over 20,000 attendance at a sellout Fairport Cropredy Convention 2017. November 2017 saw Cats in Space invited as support to Deep Purple on their five UK arena dates along with rockers Europe on UK leg of the Long Goodbye Deep Purple world tour. Cats in Space then deviated to join Status Quo as special guests on nine of their Plugged In Live and Rockin' Winter UK Tour dates ending in December, once again with final show at Hammersmith Eventim Apollo. More recently opening at the London Palladium for Bonnie Tyler in September 2019 and Blue Öyster Cult at Leicester De Montfort Hall and Newcastle City Hall October 2022

== Discography ==
CATS in SPACE

- Too Many Gods – released on Harmony Factory Records on 31 October 2015. Featured lead track 'Mr Heartache' played by Radio 2, Planet Rock and over 250 radio stations worldwide.
- Scarecrow - released on Harmony Factory Records 25 August 2017. (Bacon co-wrote ‘Timebomb’)
- Cats Alive - Cats in Space (Live at Cardiff MotorPoint Arena) Harmony Factory Records 23 February 2018
- Day Trip to Narnia - released on Harmony Factory Records 1 March 2019 (Bacon co-wrote ‘Chasing Diamonds’)
- My Kind of Christmas - released on Harmony Factory Records 6 December 2019 - (Bacon co-wrote ‘My Kind of Christmas’)
- Atlantis - released on Harmony Factory Records 27 November 2020 - (Bacon co-wrote ‘Spaceship Superstar’, ‘Sunday Best’ and the title track ‘Atlantis’)
- Kickstart The Sun - released on Harmony Factory Records 29 July 2022 - (Bacon co-wrote King Of Stars, ‘Teenage Millionaires’*, ‘Hero’, and ‘Bootleg Bandoleros’) *BBC Radio 2 played ‘Teenage Millionaires’ on Johnnie Walker’s Friday Rock Show on 15 July 2022.
- Fire in the Night - Live - double gatefold live album released on Harmony Factory / Cargo Records UK 5 July 2024
- Time Machine - released on Cherry Red Records 25 October 2024 (Bacon co-wrote the tracks Time Machine, Occam's Razor, Run For Your Life, Yesterday's Sensation, Immortal and When Love Collides)

Robin Trower

- Go My Way Aezra Records (75766 70600 20)
- Another Day's Blues V12 Records.

Richard Watts

- "RADIATE"

Janey Bombshell

- "Rock-A-Roll-Around" (JB001) independent UK release (Bacon co-wrote "Last Night on Earth")

TasteXperience

- "Celestrial Dreams" featuring Maria Nayler (v) released on TX Recordings
