= Vintage TV (TV channel) =

Former UK music television channel

- Country: United Kingdom & Canada
- Broadcast area: United Kingdom, Canada, Republic of Ireland, Hungary

Programming
- Picture format: 576i (16:9 SDTV)

Ownership
- Owner: Head Gear Films

History
- Launched: 1 September 2010
- Replaced: oMusic TV
- Closed: 7 August 2018

Vintage TV was a music television channel from the United Kingdom which launched on 1 September 2010 on Sky and Freesat.

The channel was available throughout the UK, and with limited availability in Ireland. Broadcast transmissions on satellite, cable and Freeview ceased during August 2018. Its name and programming were previously licensed to Vintage TV in Canada.

Head Gear Films, a leading Financier for Independent Film, TV & Games now owns all the assets related to Vintage TV.

== Development ==
Vintage TV broadcast a selection of music-related programming including music videos and concerts from an array of popular music artists primarily dating from the 1940s to 1990s. About 40% of its programming was original, including entertainment series and more than 500 specially created music videos featuring archive footage from the BBC, ITN, and Getty Images. Following a public vote from a list of 50 possible tracks, the first music video played on the channel was The Beach Boys' 'Good Vibrations'.

In September 2010, Vintage TV replaced oMusic TV on Sky.

In April 2011, Vintage TV appointed 3Vision on a multi-year contract to help negotiate carriage deals for Vintage TV in Europe, the Middle East and Africa (EMEA), as well as assist in the channel's aim of serving as many markets as possible by the end of 2012.

In July 2011, Vintage TV won the Freesat Award for Best Themed Channel. In April 2012, Vintage TV was shortlisted for two Freesat awards, Best Niche TV Channel and Breakout Channel of the Year, by Freesat's panel of media industry judges.

In April 2013, Vintage TV launched on Virgin Media on channel number 343.

In June 2014, Vintage TV became available on Internet connected Freeview boxes on channel 242.

From 1 July 2016, Vintage TV was on Freeview channel 86. It moved to channel 82 on 3 August 2016.

On 14 October 2016, Vintage TV launched a localized version of the channel in Canada on Shaw Direct satellite and Shaw Cable.

On 17 May 2018, Vintage TV was removed from Freesat, with the channel blaming "carriage costs" for the removal. Vintage TV was then removed from Freeview on 2 August 2018. Lastly, the channel was removed on Virgin Media and Sky on 7 August 2018. The channel later claimed that following talks with Sky it had been "offered a new deal to return to the platform" but eventually on 17 October 2018, it was confirmed that the channel had gone into administration.
