= Greg Hart =

English guitarist

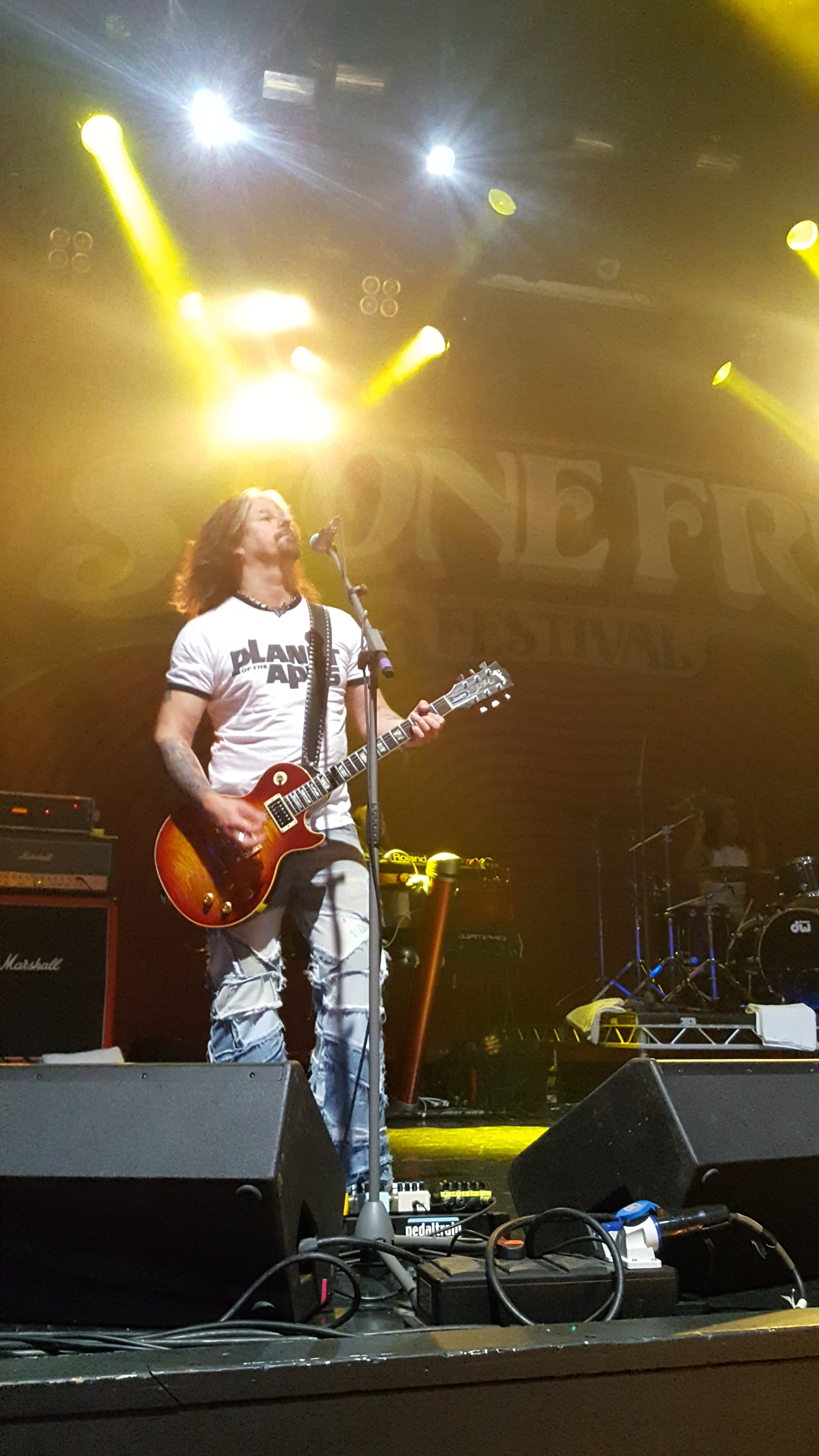
- Greg Hart at O2 Indigo with CATS in SPACE

Background information
- Genres: Rock, power pop
- Occupation: Guitarist
- Instruments: guitar, acoustic guitar, vocals, piano, synths
- Years active: 1980–present
- Label: CHERRY RED
- Website: http://www.catsinspace.co.uk/

Greg Hart is an English guitarist who is a co-founding member of the UK power pop rock band Cats in Space. The band was established in 2015 with rock drummer/percussionist Steevi Bacon.

== History ==
Hart's career started off in southern England based heavy metal band Snowblind that he formed with school friends (1980). After working with several other local bands he co-founded London rock band Moritz who recorded one EP Shadows of a Dream (1987) before splitting. In 1988 he helped form If Only with management team Harry Cowell and Simon Napier-Bell and recorded one album featuring ex-Girlschool vocalist Jackie Bodimead. The band toured the UK with ex-Ian Gillan bass player John McCoy.

In 1991 he joined up with Geoff Downes, to co-write songs and sing on the Asia album Aqua (1992) and also guested on live TV with Mike Oldfield to help promote his last album for the Virgin label Heaven's Open.

After signing a publishing deal with Peter McCamley, he teamed up for several songs with Michael Moran who also guested as orchestra leader on the debut album Too Many Gods by Cats in Space (2015). Hart also wrote songs for Donna Summer which are yet to be released, with music writer Bob Mitchell, who wrote for Cheap Trick "The Flame"

In 1995, he teamed up with keyboardist Toby Sadler and Sam Blu to record two albums under the name GTS, a studio project AOR band.

Reforming Moritz in 2008, the band recorded two albums Undivided and SOS’ on Harmony Factory, before he quit to form Cats in Space.

== Discography ==
=== Albums ===
Cats in Space

- Too Many Gods (2015, Harmony Factory)
- Scarecrow (2017, Harmony Factory)
- Cats Alive! (2018, Harmony Factory)
- Daytrip to Narnia (2019, Harmony Factory)
- Atlantis (2020, Harmony Factory)
- Kickstart The Sun (2023, Harmony Factory)
- Fire in The Night LIVE (2024, Cargo Records)
- Time Machine (2024, Cherry Red, Esoteric Recordings)
- Suit of Armour (2026, Cherry Red, Esoteric Recordings)

Moritz

- Shadows of a Dream EP (1987, RFB Records)
- City Streets (2008, Harmony Factory)
- Undivided (2009, Harmony Factory)
- SOS (2012, Harmony Factory)

If Only

- No Bed of Roses (1992, Czar Record)
- Destiny (2002, Outlaw Records)
- The Ghost of You (2004, Outlaw Records)

GTS

- Tracks From the Dustshelf (1995, GT Records)
- Time Stood Still (1996, GT Records)

Hartless

- Full Circle (2007, Harmony Factory)

Guest appearances

- Geoff Downes Vox Humana (1992, JIMCO/Blueprint Records)
- Asia Aqua (1992)
- Asia Archiva Vol. 1 (1996)
- Asia Archiva Vol. 2
- Noon (2013)
- Janey Bombshell Rocka-Roll-Around (2013)
- Decades (2017)
