= Star Square (Moscow) =

Street in Moscow, Russia

Coordinates: 55.7502°N 37.6275°E

- Interactive map of Star Square
- Native name: Площадь Звёзд Эстрады (Russian)
- Location: Moscow, Russia; Central Administrative Okrug; Tverskoy District
- Nearest metro station: Kitay-gorod

Star Square (Russian: Площадь Звёзд Эстрады), Square-alley in the center of Moscow in the Tverskoy District near Moskvoretskaya Embankment.

== Description ==
Alley is located in the center of Moscow, on the side of the Zaryadye. Modeled on Hollywood's "Walk of Fame" and on the idea of its instigators must be the most prominent figures of contemporary Russian popular culture.

=== Stars on the Star Square ===
- Mark Bernes - 1993
- Leonid Utyosov - 1993
- Vladimir Vysotsky - 1993
- Klavdiya Shulzhenko - 1993
- Lidia Ruslanova - 1993
- Izabella Yurieva - 1993
- Vadim Kozin - 1993
- Viktor Tsoi - 1993
- Boris Brunov - 1997
- Yuri Antonov - 1997
- Irina Ponarovskaya - 1997
- Makhmud Esambayev - 1997
- Valery Leontiev - 1998
- Alexander Tsfasman - 1998
- Nikita Bogoslovsky - 1998
- Edita Piekha - 1998
- Alexander Vertinsky - 1998
- Vladimir Vinokur - 1998
- Vyacheslav Dobrynin - 1998
- Gelena Velikanova - 1998
- Igor Krutoy - 1998
- Nikolai Slichenko - 1998
- Vasily Solovyov-Sedoi - 1998
- Mikhail Tanich - 1998
- Ilya Reznik - 1998
- "Na-Na" - 1998
- MVD Ensemble - 1998
- Joachim Sharoev - 1998
- Boris Krasnov - 1998
- Pyotr Leshchenko - 1998
- Maria Mironova and Alexander Menaker - 1999
- Andrei Mironov - 1999
- Lev Leshchenko - 1999
- Oscar Feltsman - 1999
- Alexander Malinin - 1999
- Vakhtang Kikabidze - 1999
- Oleg Gazmanov - 1999
- Igor Luchenok - 1999
- The ensemble "Orera" - 1999
- Polad Bülbüloğlu - 2000
- Ludmila Ryumina - 2000
- Arkady Raikin - 2001
- Vladimir Mulyavin and ensemble "Pesniary" - 2001
- Pyatnitsky Choir - 2001
- Oleg Lundstrom - 2001
- Nani Bregvadze - 2001
- Yevgeny Martynov - 2001
- Arno Babajanyan - 2001
- Andrei Petrov - 2001
- Valery Obodzinsky - 2002
- Alexander Zatsepin - 2002
- Maya Kristalinskaya - 2002
- Yuri Saulsky - 2002
- Leonid Derbenyov - 2002
- Andrei Dementyev - 2002
- Vladimir Migulya - 2002
- Alexander Alexandrov - 2003
- Matvey Blanter - 2003
- Anatoly Novikov - 2003
- Sofia Rotaru - 2003
- Anna German - 2003
- Alla Bayanova - 2003
- Anatoly Kroll - 2003
- Vladimir Troshin - 2003
- Eduard Kolmanovsky - 2003
- Arkady Ostrovsky - 2004
- Yevgeny Krylatov - 2004
- Alexander Morozov - 2004
- Mikhail Finberg - 2004
- Yuri Vizbor - 2004
- Georgy Garanian - 2004
- Tamara Miansarova - 2004
- Irina Allegrova - 2004
- Igor Bril - 2004
- Roza Rymbaeva - 2005
- Maksim Dunayevsky - 2005
- Mark Fradkin - 2005
- Boris Mokrousov - 2005
- Serafim Tulikov - 2005
- Alexander Zhurbin - 2005
- The show group "Doctor Watson" - 2005
- Eugene Ptichkin - 2005
- Syabry - 2006
- Shandor
- Igor Yung
- Edward Smolny
- Lev Oshanin
- Snoop Dogg - 2010
- Yuri Silant'ev
- Moskovskij Komsomolets
- Europa Plus
