= Orpheus in Exile =

Studio album by Marc Almond
- Released: 6 October 2009
- Recorded: Andrei Dorofeev Studio, Pavian Records, Garret Studio (Moscow)
- Genres: Russian traditional music, Russian romance
- Length: 39:49
- Label: Strike Force Entertainment / Cherry Red Records
- Producer: Alexei Fedorov

Marc Almond chronology
Stardom Road (2007)	Orpheus in Exile (2009)	Varieté (2010)

Orpheus in Exile, also known as Orpheus in Exile: Songs of Vadim Kozin, is the fourteenth solo studio album by the British singer/songwriter Marc Almond. The artist credit on the album cover is extended to read 'Marc Almond with Alexei Fedorov featuring The Rossia Orchestra Ensemble'. The album was released by Strike Force Entertainment, part of Cherry Red Records, on 6 October 2009. It is an album of cover versions of songs originally recorded by Vadim Kozin, performed in the Russian traditional music and Russian romance styles.

== Background ==
Orpheus in Exile is an album of cover versions of songs originally recorded by Vadim Kozin, an artist Almond had already covered two songs by on his 2003 album Heart on Snow. According to an article in the Russian magazine, New Style, the album was self-financed by Almond and recorded in Russia using Russian musicians. Like Heart on Snow, this album is in the Russian traditional music and Russian romance style.

The first edition of the album came in a digipak in a card slip sleeve and included an essay by Almond giving extensive background information on Kozin's life.

== Critical reception ==
Professional ratings
Review scores
Source	Rating
AllMusic	4/5 stars
Record Collector	3/5 stars
Daily Express	4/5 stars
The Scotsman	4/5 stars

Orpheus in Exile was well received by critics overall. John Tatlock of The Quietus calls the album "a respectful tribute and joyous celebration rather than an overly reverent imitation" as well as "a career highlight and a unique window on a marginalised and hidden history". Thom Jureck of AllMusic compares "the way that Almond resurrects and delivers Kozin's music" to "the stuff of poetry itself" before summarising that the album "reflects and invokes the deeper emotions these songs convey in anyone open-minded enough to give them a sincere listen". The Daily Express is also positive, calling Almond's approach to "these luscious tales of love, loss and bitter fate" as "masterful" in a review by Robert Spellman. The Record Collector review recognises that Almond makes some tough career choices that are sometimes "hard to get over" but feels that the listener will "thoroughly enjoy Almond's heartfelt homage to the late Russian singer Kozin", adding that "the arrangements and instrumentation are breathtaking at every step". The Scotsman review adds a slight reservation to an otherwise positive review, stating that the album is "hugely enjoyable, if predictable to anyone already familiar with Almond's chanson repertoire".

== Track listing ==
1. "Boulevards of Magadan" (Vadim Kozin, P. Nefedov) – 3:26
2. "Forgotten Tango" (Kozin, S. Strizhov) – 2:43
3. "My Fire" (F. Sadovsky, Yakov Polonsky) – 3:11
4. "I Love So Much to Look in Your Eyes" (Kozin, unknown) – 2:24
5. "Friendship" (V. Sidorov, A Shmulyan) – 3:34
6. "Pearly Night" (M. Shyshkin, M. Yazykov) – 2:51
7. "Brave Boy" (Kozin, Iosif Utkin) – 3:07
8. "Day and Night" (Kozin, Rudyard Kipling, N. Braun) – 2:48
9. "A Skein of White Cranes" (Kozin) – 2:47
10. "Beggar" (Alexander Alyabyev, Pierre-Jean de Béranger, Dmitri Lensky) – 3:20
11. "When Youth Becomes a Memory" (Kozin, Aleksey Fatyanov) – 3:27
12. "Autumn" (Kozin, Elizaveta Belogorskaya) – 3:13
13. "Letter from Magadan" (Kozin, Nefedov) – 3:52

== Personnel ==
- Marc Almond – vocals
- Anatole Sobolev – conductor
- Orchestra Rossia – orchestra
- Evgeny Kudryashov (from band Disen Gage) – drums, percussion
- Timur Pirogov – bass, double bass
- Igor Uporov – rhythm guitar, solo guitar
- Sergei Bagin (from band Disen Gage) – rhythm guitar, acoustic guitar
- Oleg Smirnov (from band Exit Project) – acoustic guitar
- Alexei Fedorov v rhythm guitar, backing vocals
- Anatoly Ponomarev – bayan
- Lyudmila Karpoushkina – violins
- Dmitri Sadkov – grand piano, keyboard instrument
- Oleg Anurin (from band Batisfera) – grand piano, keyboards, clarinet
- Varvara Kalganova – grand piano
- Katia Strelnitski – translations of lyrics from the Russian
