= Heart on Snow =

Studio album by Marc Almond
- Released: 21 October 2003
- Recorded: PSG Melodia (St Petersburg), Mosfilm (Moscow), SBN Recordings (Moscow), Mute Studios (London)
- Genres: Russian traditional music, Russian romance
- Length: 67:46
- Label: Blue Star Music / XIII BIS Records
- Producer: Andrei Samsonov

Marc Almond chronology
Stranger Things (2001)	Heart on Snow (2003)	Stardom Road (2007)

Singles from Heart on Snow
- 1. ""Gone But Not Forgotten" b/w "Gosudariunia" & "Just One Chance"" Released: September 2003

Heart on Snow is the twelfth solo studio album by the British singer/songwriter Marc Almond. It was released by Blue Star Music, in conjunction with XIII BIS Records, on 21 October 2003.

== Background ==
An article by the BBC describes how Almond "went to St Petersburg to interpret traditional Russian romance songs" to make what "may have become his most ambitious album so far". Almond mostly sang cover versions of traditional Russian songs, including a number from the Russian romance canon, and collaborated with a number of Russian artists on the album, such as Alla Bayanova and Lyudmila Zykina.

The album was released as a standard jewel case CD and a limited edition CD book in a slipcase containing a 44-page book with extensive background notes to all of the songs.

The single "Gone But Not Forgotten" was released from the album in September 2003 with two tracks ("Gosudaryunia" and "Just One Chance") and the video for the title track.

== Critical reception ==
Professional ratings
Review scores
Source	Rating
Uncut	3/5 stars
The Guardian	2/5 stars
Encyclopedia of Popular Music	3/5 stars
Komsomolskaya Pravda	(mixed)

Reviews for Heart on Snow were mixed. Dorian Lynskey in The Guardian describes Heart on Snow as "a labour of love for which it's hard to feel much affection" and as lacking "the sly humour of Soft Cell and his best solo work" yet admires the "boldness and integrity in making an album that only uses Russian musicians". The review in Uncut states that Almond keeps his versions of the material "respectful which, despite the lack of Russian wildness, makes it (Heart on Snow) all the more moving". Paul Taylor in the Manchester Evening News describes the album as "a cunning mixture of smooth, westernised productions and balalaika-plucking, raw Russky folk stylings" and states that "anyone remotely broad-minded about their music would find this a joy".

A Russian Komsomolskaya Pravda praised the interpretation of Gypsy romances ("Two Guitars", "The Glance of Your Dark Eyes"), described "Oh, My Soul" and "Luna" as "clash of decadence" and proclaimed "Gosudarynia" as the best track on the album.

== Track listing ==
No.	Title	Writer(s)	Origins	Length
1.	"So Long the Path (So Wide the Field)"	Marc Almond, Lev Knipper, Viktor Gusev	based on Polyushko-polye	3:12
2.	"Strange Feeling" (duet with Sergey Penkin)	Alex Prusov	originally performed by Sergey Penkin	3:42
3.	"Gosudaryunia" (featuring Aquarium)	Boris Grebenshchikov	originally performed by Aquarium	3:05
4.	"Always and Everywhere (I Will Follow You)"	Sofus Gerdel	originally performed by Vadim Kozin	3:40
5.	"Oh, My Soul" (duet with Alla Bayanova)	trad.	traditional	3:31
6.	"Two Guitars" (with Loiko)	Apollon Grigoryev, Ivan Vasiliev	traditional	3:32
7.	"Heart on Snow" (with 'Russia' orchestra)	Arno Babajanian, Aleksandr Dmokhovskij	originally performed by Arno Babajanian	4:03
8.	"Nuit De Noel" (with Boris Grebenschikov)	Alexander Vertinsky	originally performed by Alexander Vertinsky	2:53
9.	"Romance"	Nikolai Noskov, Nikolay Gumilyov	originally performed by Nikolai Noskov	4:59
10.	"The Storks"	Yan Frenkel, Rasul Gamzatov	originally Zhuravli (The Cranes)	3:53
11.	"Luna (The Moon)" (duet with Alla Bayanova)	Bayanova, Tatyana Flaviskaya	originally performed by Alla Bayanova	2:01
12.	"White Flowers of Acacia"	trad., A Pugachev	Russian romance song	2:33
13.	"The Glance of Your Dark Eyes" (featuring Mikhail Aptekman)	Nikolai Zubov, I Zhelezko	Russian romance song	3:48
14.	"If Your Affectionate Smile Has Gone" (duet with Ilya Lagutenko)	Vasily Lebedev-Kumach	originally performed by V Kozin	4:11
15.	"Sleeping Beauty"	Andrei Samsonov, Almond		3:59
16.	"Just One Chance" (duet with Lyudmila Zykina)	Boris Fomin, Pedro Saint German	Russian romance song	4:22
17.	"Gone But Not Forgotten"	Almond, Martin Watkins		4:29
18.	"So Wide The Field (Reprise)" (featuring Mikhail Aptekman)	Almond, Knipper, Gusev	based on Polyushko-polye	1:38

Limited Edition bonus tracks (2003)
No.	Title	Writer(s)	Origins	Length
19.	"The Glance of Your Dark Eyes (version 2)" (featuring Mikhail Aptekman)	Nikolai Zubov, I Zhelezko	Russian romance song	4:15

Reissue bonus tracks (2022)
No.	Title	Writer(s)	Origins	Length
20.	"The Sun Will Arise" (with The "Rossiya" Orchestra)	Gennady Gladkov, Yuri Entin	originally performed by Muslim Magomayev	3:14
21.	"Tenderness" (with The "Rossiya" Orchestra)	Aleksandra Pakhmutova, Nikolai Dobronravov, Sergey Grebennikov	originally performed by Maya Kristalinskaya	3:21
22.	"Black Raven" (new recording 2021)	trad., Nikolay Veryovkin	Cossack traditional song	4:20

*Note – there is a discrepancy with the titles of tracks 13 and 19 between the liner notes, "Glance From Your Dark Eyes"; and the track listing, "The Glance of Your Dark Eyes".

== Personnel ==
In addition to artists credited in the track listing:

- Marc Almond – vocals, translation adaptation
- Martin Watkins – piano, original keyboards, arrangements
- Andrei Samsonov – keyboards
- Oleg Belov – keyboards, grand piano
- Mikhail Aptekman – grand piano
- Sergey Erdenko – violin
- Georgij Osmolovskij – violin
- Aliosha Bezlepkin – guitar
- Vladimir Kudryavtsev – double bass
- Grigory Voskoboynikov – double bass
- Albert Potapkin – drums
- Garij Bagdasaryan – drums
- Oleg Sakmarov – flute
- Andrej Vikharev – percussion
- Sergej Shurakov – accordion
- Kirill Kravtsov – cello
- Alexandre Kiahidi – trumpet
- Dmitrij Kuzmin – tuba
- Karin Brown – French horn
- Viktor Bastrakov – guitar
- Maria Shurakova – mandolin
- Vladimir Miller – bass vocal
- Anatoli Sobolev – conductor
- The St Petersburg Higher Naval Engineering Choir – choir
- Gardemarin Youth Choir – choir
- Julia Khutoretskaya – choir leader
