= Evening Bell =

Evening Bell or Evening Bells may refer to:

- Evening Bell (song), a Russian song written in 1828 by Ivan Kozlov and Alexander Alyabyev
- Evening Bell (film), a 1988 Chinese war film directed by Wu Ziniu
- Evening Bells (painting), an 1892 oil painting by the Russian artist Isaac Levitan
- Evening Bells (film), a 1986 film
