= Boris Fomin =

Soviet musician and composer

- Борис Фомин
- Fomin in the mid-1920s
- Born: Boris Ivanovich Fomin; 12 April 1900; Saint Petersburg, Russian Empire
- Died: 25 October 1948 (aged 48); Moscow, Russian SFSR, Soviet Union
- Resting place: Vvedenskoye Cemetery
- Occupations: Musician; composer
- Years active: 1922–1946

Boris Ivanovich Fomin (Russian: Бори́с Ива́нович Фоми́н, IPA: [bɐˈrʲis ɨˈvanəvʲɪtɕ fɐˈmʲin]; 12 April 1900 – 25 October 1948) was a Russian and Soviet musician and composer who specialized in the Russian romance.

Several of Fomin's songs became popular in 1920s, most notably "Dorogoi dlinnoyu" ("Дорогой длинною", "By the long road"), commonly known for its English version "Those Were the Days", made world-famous in 1968 by Mary Hopkin and credited to Eugene Raskin, who in 1962 wrote the English lyrics for the tune and claimed the song for his own. It was composed by Boris Fomin in 1924, first interpreted and recorded by Tamara Tsereteli (1925) and Alexander Vertinsky (1926); it was the latter who popularized it abroad.

== Biography ==
=== Early life ===
Boris Ivanovich Fomin was born in Saint Petersburg. His father Ivan Yakovlevich (1869–1935) was a high-ranking army official serving at the State Military control office, who counted Mikhail Lomonosov among his distant relatives. His mother Yevgenia Ioannovna Pekar (1872–1954), a daughter of Alexander II's lady-in-waiting, was of Austrian origins; she married (but soon divorced) an Italian man, and it was the latter's musical talents that were considered to be inherited by his grandson who by the age of four played well the accordion even if having obvious difficulties holding it. Boris had three sisters, Valentina (a year older), Lydia and Olga, 8 and 12 years younger, respectively.

=== Education ===
At his father's behest, Boris joined a realschule but his passion for music was impossible to ignore. At the age of twelve, he joined the piano class of the Conservatory Professor Anna Yesipova, whose list of pupils included Sergei Prokofiev. After Yesipova's death in 1914, Fomin, tutored by two of her colleagues, Benditsky and Sakharov, joined the Saint Petersburg Philharmonics. A year later he enrolled at the Saint Petersburg Conservatory. His education was disrupted by the 1917 Revolution and later he never attempted to complete it. In retrospect, biographers argued, the Conservatory diploma would have made his later life much easier.

In March 1918, invited personally by Vladimir Lenin to join the military apparatus of the new Bolshevik government, Ivan Fomin came to Moscow and soon moved his family to a five-room-flat by Chistye Prudy. In the early 1919 Boris Fomin volunteered for the Red Army. As a realschule graduate, he was sent to work at the repair and restoration of frontline railways, but enjoyed himself as a performing artist too, often staging one-man-shows upon the wagon platforms.

=== Early musical career ===
In 1921 Fomin returned to Moscow and wrote the music for the operetta Career of Pirpoint Black, with lyrics by Konstantin Podrevsky and Alexey Fayko. The show enjoyed a successful run in Moscow and Petrograd in 1922, but was received coolly by the Bolshevik press, highly suspicious of the genre as a whole. "Music there is only marginally better than that of Kalman or Lehar," one newspaper 'reviewer' wrote, in all seriousness.

The three ballets Fomin wrote (including Max and Moriz, with Vadim Shershenevich as a librettist) did little to bring him the recognition he craved. At that point, he tried his hand at the Russian romance and in it found his true calling.

His friendship with poet and lyricist Konstantin Podrevsky was instrumental in this. They met in 1923 when both became members of the Soviet Union of Music and Drama Writers. Together they wrote some 30 songs, one of the first being "Dorogoi dlinnoyu", written in late 1924. Its first performer was Tamara Tsereteli who recorded the song in 1925. A year later Alexander Vertinsky recorded it in Paris; he included the song into his standard repertoire, and continued to perform it throughout his career, albeit making various changes to the lyrics.

Among other successful numbers Fomin penned in mid-1920s were "Ei, drug-gitara" (Hey, My Friend Guitar), "Tvoi glaza zelyonye" (Your Green Eyes), as well as "Tolko raz" (Only Once), the latter dedicated to the former Gypsy band singer Maria Masalskaya, then his mother-in-law.

Fomin became a celebrity and for the next three years enjoyed himself as part and parcel of the artistic life in Moscow.

=== Denounced as 'counter-revolutionary' ===
All this abruptly ended in June 1929, when the All-Soviet Conference of Musicians, held in Leningrad, pronounced Russian romance a 'counter-revolutionary' genre. It later transpired "Dorogoi Dlinnoyu" – a wistful nostalgia for the 'old times' – had been banned earlier, in 1927.

In 1937 Fomin was arrested, apparently as a result of violations in the Russian province, of the ban imposed on his songs. He spent a year in Butyrka, then was released. Rumour had it, Stalin admired his song "Sasha" (with lyrics by Pavel German), as performed by Izabella Yurieva, although his biographers doubt that would have been good enough reason for the Soviet leader to personally intervene: They consider the release to be the combined result of the Fomin's poor health and the 'technical' reason that at least some of his accusers and investigators having themselves been arrested and prosecuted, a situation not unusual at the height of the Great Purge.

=== Later musical career ===
Two of the songs he wrote in the late 1930s later became famous: "Izumrud" (Emerald) and "Ne govori mne etikh slov nebrezhnykh" ("Don't tell me these careless words"). Many others have been lost. Still, in 1939–1940 Fomin's songs started to come out on records again, performed by Izabella Yurieva ("Sasha", "Words and Wishes", "Everything's Ahead", "Sing, the Gypsy Man!", "Smile", "Only Once"), Tamara Tsereteli ("I Cannot Love You", "Come on, Don't Be So Sad", "The Meeting") and Klavdiya Shulzhenko ("Snub-nose", "Simple Words", "Sons").

As the Great Patriotic War broke out, Fomin stayed in Moscow. Supported by the Interior ministry, he organized the Yastrebok (Young Hawk) theatre – which for almost a year remained the only functioning one in the Soviet capital – and performed regularly for the frontline Red Army fighters. The sense of urgency and being in demand again gave him the energy to fight back the disease. He wrote more than 150 war-themed songs; at least three of them were recorded and released in 1945 by Klavdiya Shulzhenko.

As the War ended and officials started to return to Moscow, Fomin again became a 'forgotten' author. His name was 'remembered', briefly, as the Zhdanov-inspired 'anti-poshlust' campaign of 1946, and Fomin found himself in the list of 'ideological aliens', topped by Mikhail Zoshchenko and Anna Akhmatova.

=== Death ===
For many years Fomin suffered from tuberculosis, even if totally refusing to consider himself a sick man. For people around him he looked like a 'fountain of optimism', according to Galina Alexandrovna, his wife:

"He's never been a domestic type. Ever sociable, always working ... Writing songs at night, for there was just no time for them in the daytime. I always marveled at his tirelessness. A very sick man, he never despaired, always believed in a better future ... [was sure] that the anti-Romance campaign was some kind of 'temporary blindness', and that the time would come and people will start to sing his songs again. That belief apparently gave him the force."

In 1948 Fomin's health deteriorated and he went to the Vysokiye Gory clinic. Friends managed to procure some penicillin for him – a rarity in those days in the USSR – available only to members of the nomenklatura. The cure might have saved his life earlier, but by then it was too late. Fomin died on 25 October 1948. He was interred at the Vvedenskoye Cemetery.

== Legacy ==
Boris Fomin, who wrote more than 400 songs, three ballets and three operettas, became renowned in the 1920s as a master of the Russian romance. After 1929, when the whole genre was pronounced 'counter-revolutionary', Fomin slipped into oblivion, and all of his famous hits were banned. In the post-Stalinist Soviet Union some of them were revived (notably, by Nani Bregvadze, who performed and recorded "Dorogoi dlinnoyu" in 1967), but invariably as 'folk songs', their author uncredited. In the late-1990s – early 2000s, popular artists like Oleg Pogudin and Nina Shatskaya started to perform Fomin's songs. The first comprehensive biography of Fomin, The Happy Unfortunate (Счастливый неудачник), by Elena and Valery Ukolovs came out in 2000. The composer's song legacy enjoyed a rebirth, and the general public in Russia was shocked to realize that some of their best-loved romances that they believed to be 'traditional' or 'folk' songs, were authored by Boris Fomin, a composer whose name hasn't been mentioned in the Soviet press for decades.
