= Alla Bayanova =

Russian singer

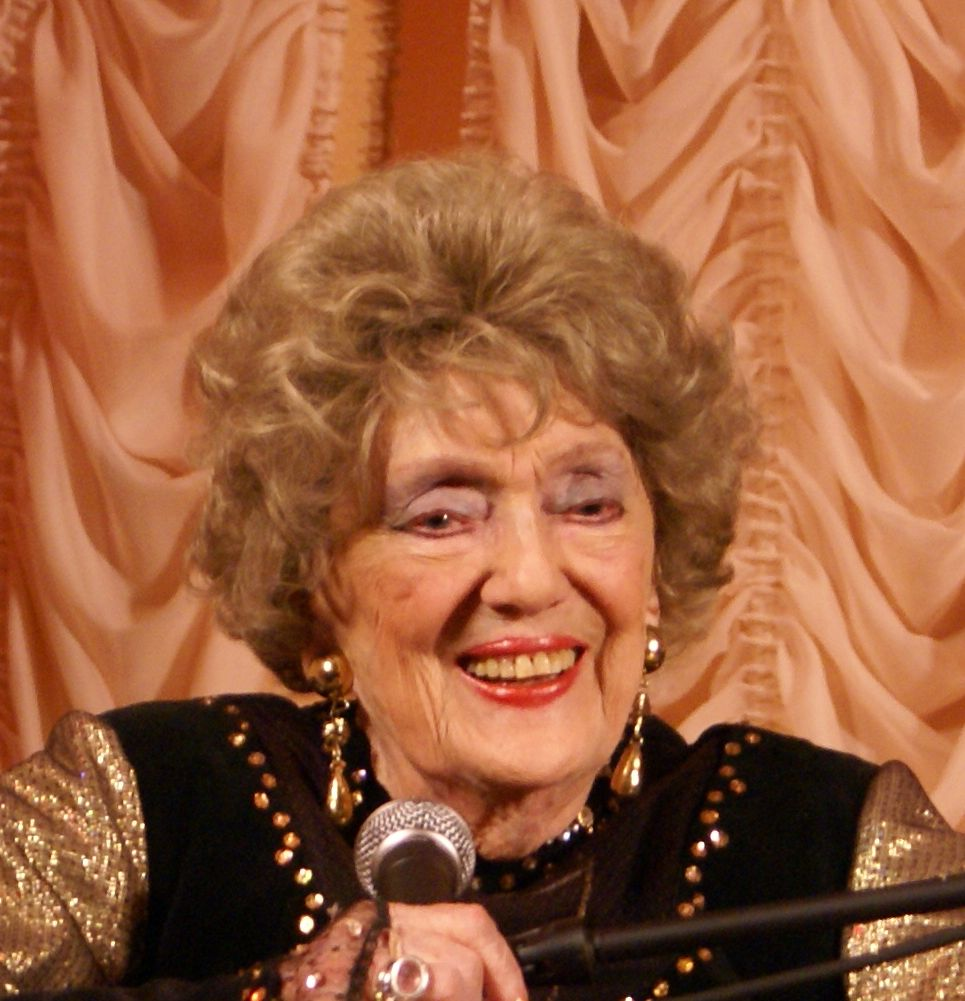
Alla Bayanova, 2007

Alla Nikolayevna Bayanova (Russian: Алла Николаевна Баянова; 18 May 1914 – 30 August 2011) was a Russian Romance singer sometimes compared with Édith Piaf for her simple yet dramatic style of performance.

Bayanova was born in Kishinev in the family of an opera singer, who moved to Paris in 1918 after Bessarabia decided to unite with Romania. She debuted on the stage as an assistant to her father in 1923, aged nine. By 1927, she was already performing solo. A major step forward in her career was when she assisted Alexander Vertinsky in his famous show at the Hermitage Restaurant, Montmartre. Two years later, her family moved to Belgrade, while Bayanova went on touring Germany, Greece, Palestine, and Egypt.

In 1931, she got acquainted with Pyotr Leshchenko, a foremost Russian singer of the time, who helped her to join the Pavilion Russe in Bucharest. She married a local aristocrat, George Ypsilanti, and made several recordings of tangos (e.g., Columbia, His Master's Voice). After her divorce from Ypsilanti, she signed a contract with the Polish recording company "Syrena-Electro".

In March 1941, Bayanova was arrested by the Romanian authorities and interned into a concentration camp for having performed in the Russian language. Although released in May 1942, she was kept under surveillance until the end of World War II. In the 1960s and 1970s, while still living in Romania, she issued eight LPs. Nicolae Ceaușescu's government, however, pressed her into migrating to the USSR in 1988. Thereupon she settled in Moscow, making occasional appearances on the Russian television. Bayanova was named People's Artist of Russian Federation and celebrated the 80th anniversary of her stage career in 2003. In 2004, she sang in a concert to celebrate her 90th birthday. Her last work was in collaboration with Marc Almond on his 2003 album Heart on Snow. In 2003 Bayanova received a star on the Star Square in Moscow.

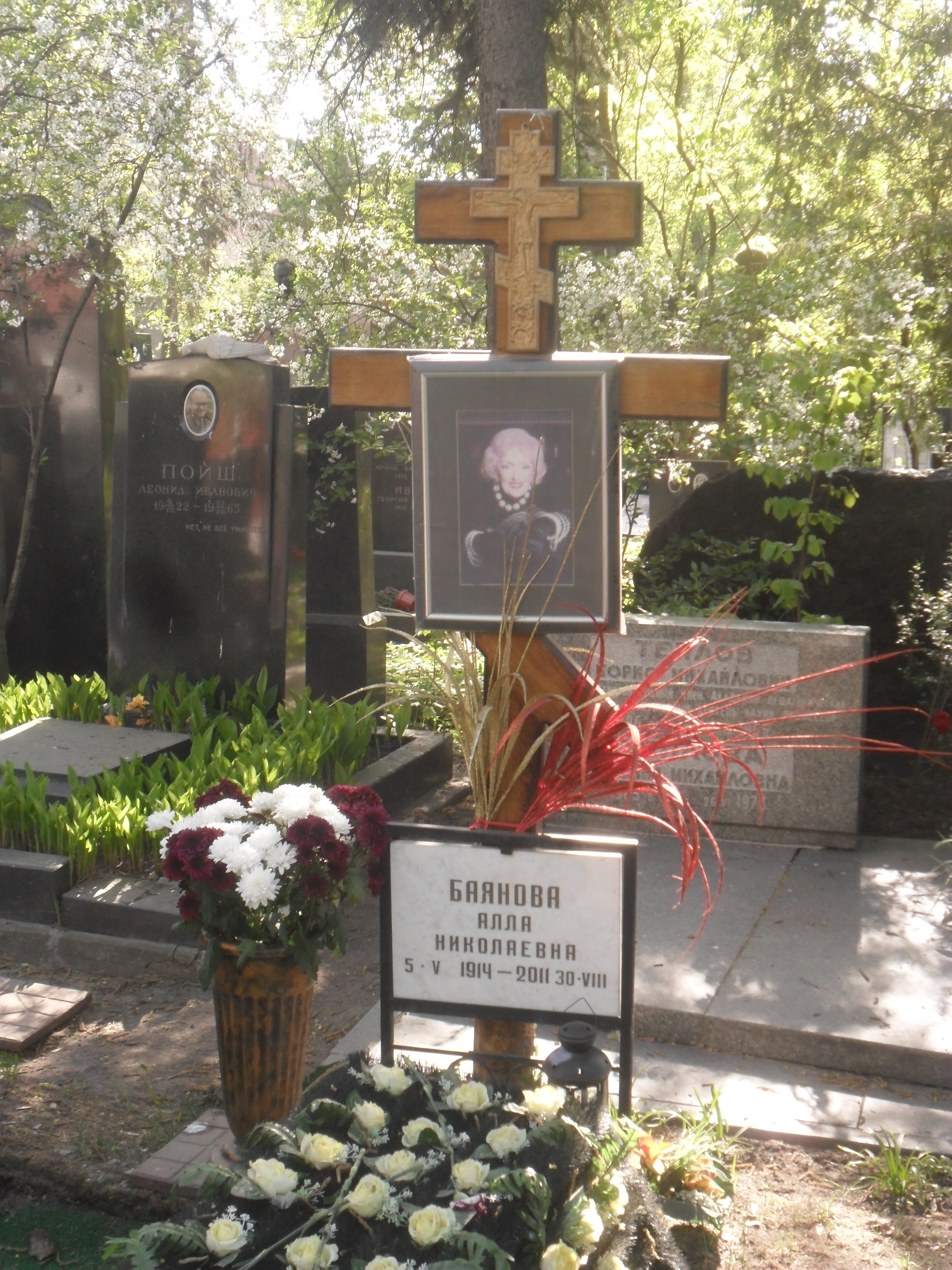
The grave of Alla Bayanova at Novodevichy Cemetery in Moscow.

She died on 30 August 2011, aged 97, of cancer. Upon learning of her death, Russian president Dmitry Medvedev stated: “Her life was dedicated to the high purpose of bringing people joy through interaction with true art. Ms Bayanova had a rare, beautiful voice, and her mastery and heartfelt performances of Russian songs gained her recognition around the world.”

== Legacy ==
By order of the Government of Moscow, a commemorative plaque honoring A. Bayanova was installed on the Star Square in 2003.

On 10 December 2011, asteroid 23411 Bayanova, discovered in 1978 by Soviet astronomer L. V. Zhuravlyova, was named in honor of A. N. Bayanova.
