= Evening Bells (painting) =

1892 painting by Isaac Levitan

- Вечерний звон (Russian)
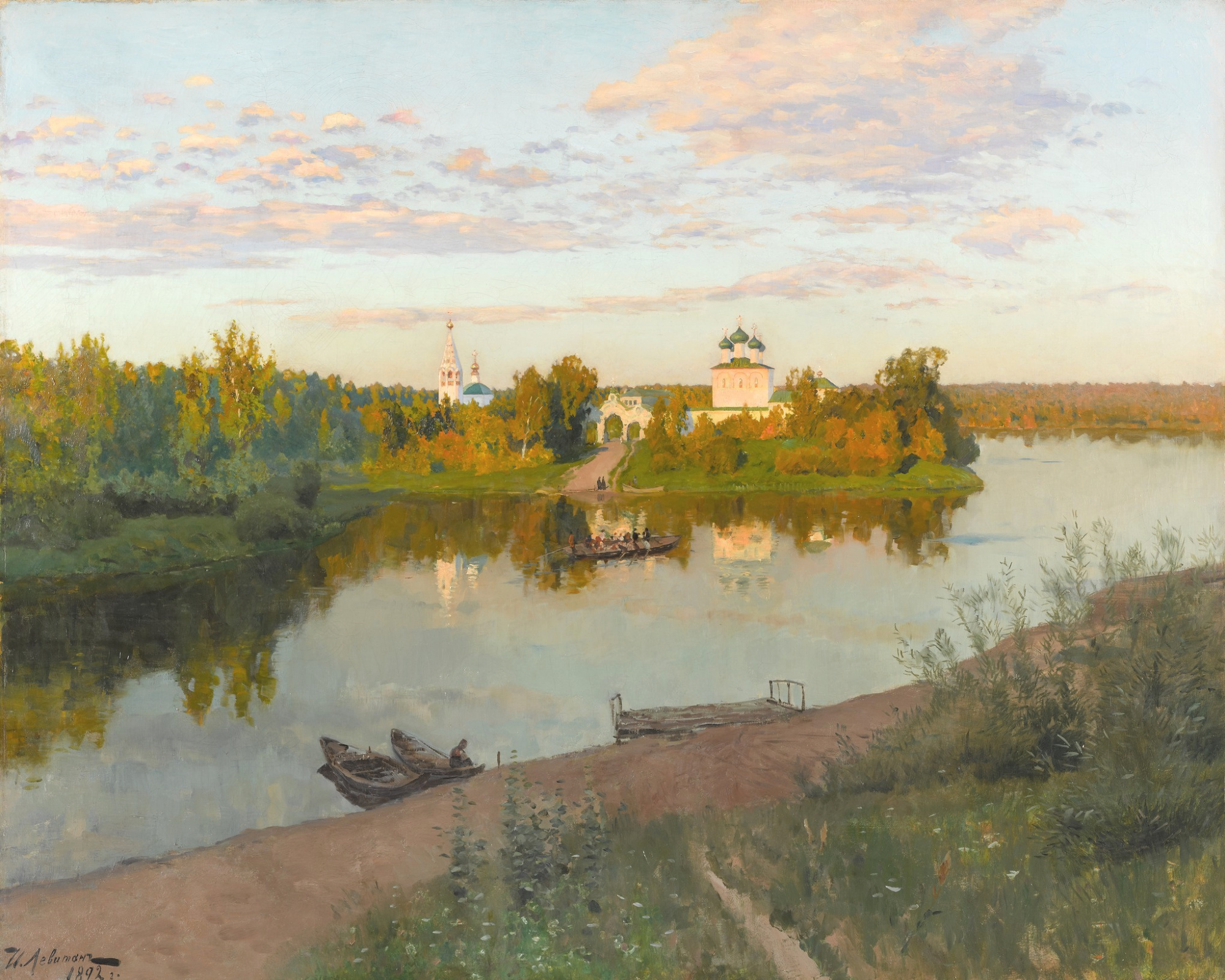
- Artist: Isaac Levitan
- Year: 1892
- Medium: Oil on canvas
- Dimensions: 87 cm × 107.6 cm (34 in × 42.4 in)
- Location: Tretyakov Gallery, Moscow

Evening Bells (Russian: Вечерний звон, romanized: Vecherniy zvon) is an 1892 oil painting by the Russian artist Isaac Levitan. The painting depicts a monastery standing by a river bend in the evening light. It is thought to be a variation of an earlier painting from 1890, Quiet Abode, which depicted a similar monastery. Evening Bells has been housed in Moscow's Tretyakov Gallery since 1918.

The painting was created by Levitan in 1892. It was sent to Saint Petersburg in December 1892, and then to the 1893 World's Fair in Chicago, where it was exhibited under the title A Convent on the Eve of a Holiday. The painting was kept in the Filosofovs-Ratkovs family collection until 1918, when it was donated to the Tretyakov Gallery.

According to art historian Aleksei Fedorov-Davydov, in Evening Bells, Levitan managed "to create an impression of image commonality and unity, harmony of parts as a whole". This canvas is "one of the most musical and perfect in its artistic structure of Levitan's works", according to art historian Vladimir Petrov. He writes that "despite the motif's similarity to Quiet Abode, Evening Bells is nevertheless devoid of secondary character, has its own, unique charm".

== History ==
=== Background and creation ===
Isaac Levitan had the idea for a painting depicting a monastery in the setting sun in 1887, while living in Slobodka near Zvenigorod and observing the Savvino-Storozhevsky Monastery at sunset. Two years later, while in Plyos, Levitan visited Yuryevets in search of new motifs for paintings and came across a small monastery, which rekindled his desire to create such a landscape. As a result, the plots of future works became intertwined with visions of these two monasteries.

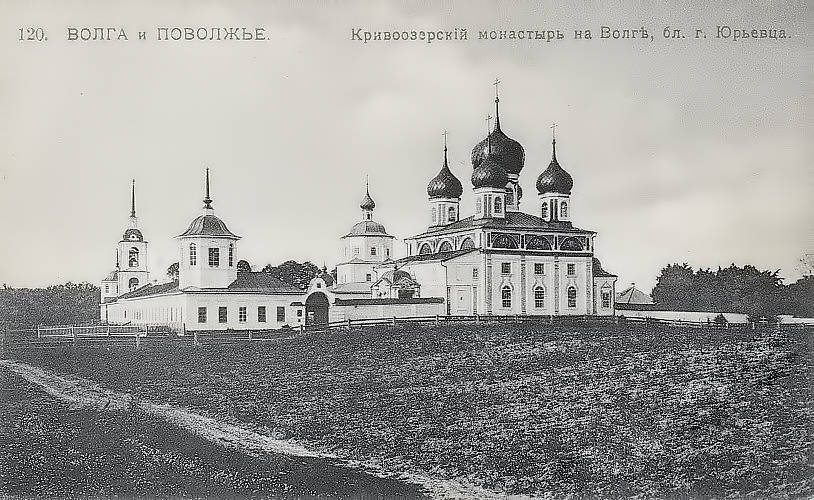
Krivozero Monastery on the Volga near Yuryevets (1913 photo)

The monastery near Yuryevets was called the Krivozero. Levitan first depicted a similar monastery in the painting Quiet Abode, which is currently housed in the Tretyakov Gallery, and then two years later in the painting Evening Bells. A hipped-type bell tower (with a cone-shaped top) is depicted as part of the monastery in both works. According to various assumptions, the artist could have used the bell tower of the Sobornaya Gora church in Plyos as a prototype, or the bell tower of the Resurrection Church in the village of Reshma.

After finishing By the Pool, Levitan painted Evening Bells in 1892. There are various theories about the origin of the painting's name. According to Sofia Prorokova, the author of Levitan's biography, the name Evening Bells could be associated with the song of the same name by composer Alexander Alyabiev on words by poet Ivan Kozlov. According to Prorokova, Levitan frequently sang the song, possibly because it reminded him of "the summer evenings in Plyos, when the entire polyphony of church bells came into operation and melodious bells resounded around". Another version, cited in a monograph by art historian Aleksei Fedorov-Davydov, claims that Levitan was influenced by a collection of poems by the Russian poet Yakov Polonsky, Evening Bells, published in 1890 and containing works by the poet written between 1887 and 1890. Evening Bells was the title of the final poem in this collection.

There is a sketch of Evening Bells called simply Evening (35 by 39 centimetres (14 in × 15 in)). This 1891 sketch is in a private collection in the Czech Republic. It depicts a landscape that is similar to the one in the final version of the painting – in a similar evening light and colour scheme, but without the shore in front and without the monastery buildings.

=== After creation ===
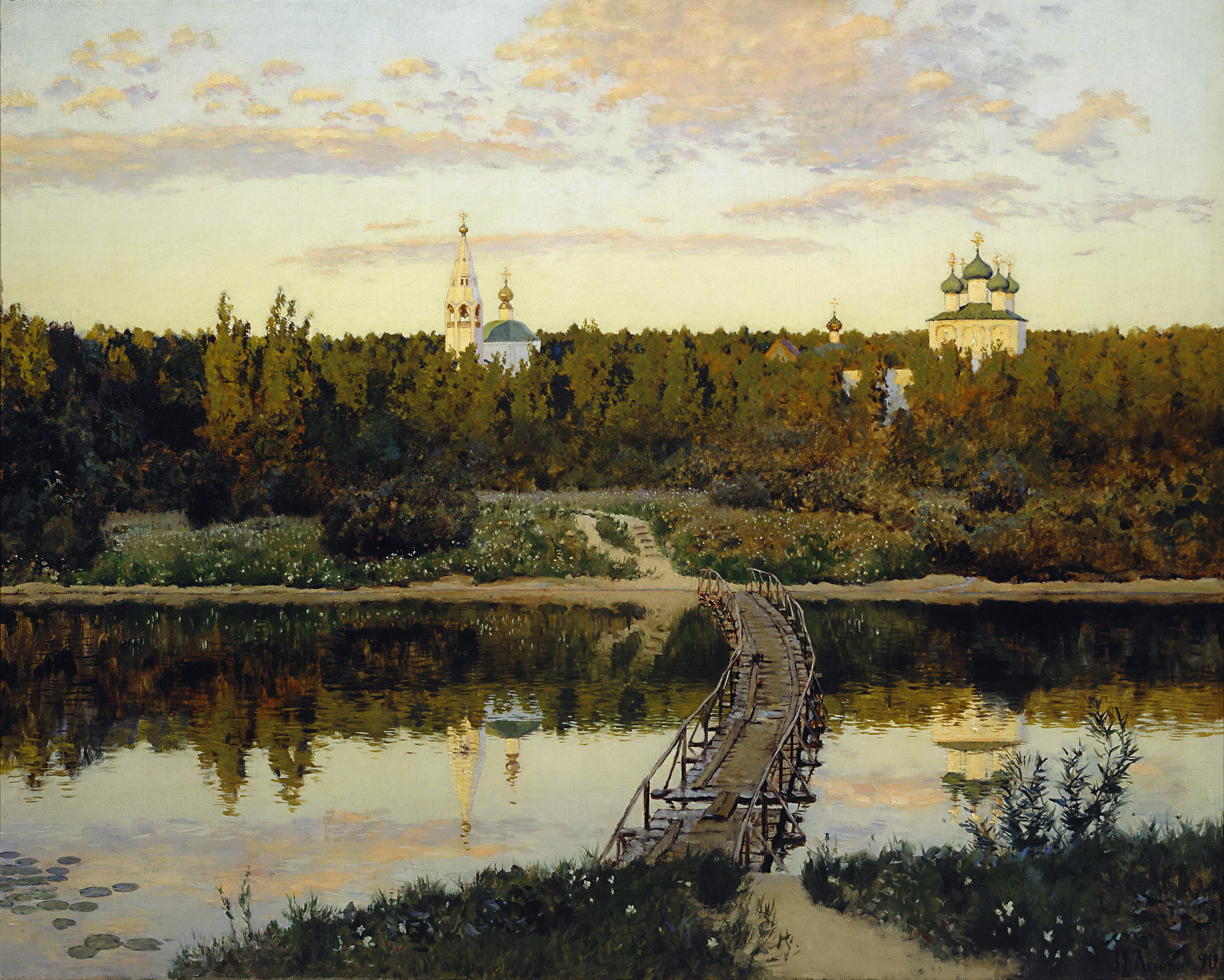
Quiet Abode (oil on canvas, 1890, Tretyakov Gallery

Evening Bells was sent to the Saint Petersburg Academy of Arts in December 1892 for the Russian section of the 1893 World's Fair in Chicago, where it was exhibited under the title A Convent on the Eve of a Holiday. The painting was shown at Levitan's posthumous exhibition in Saint Petersburg in 1901 under the title Quiet Abode.

Evening Bells was later in the collection of the Filosofovs-Ratkovs, and by 1918, it was in the possession of Zinaida Ratkova-Rozhnova. When she left Russia in 1918, she left behind a number of artworks from her Moscow collection to the Tretyakov Gallery, including Levitan's Evening Bells and paintings by Alexey Venetsianov, Valentin Serov, and others.

Evening Bells was shown at several occasions, including Levitan's personal exhibitions in 1938 at the State Tretyakov Gallery in Moscow and in 1939 at the State Russian Museum in Leningrad (now Saint Petersburg), as well as the exhibition commemorating the artist's 100th birthday, held in Moscow and Leningrad in 1960–1961. Between 1971 and 1972, the painting was shown at the "Peredvizhniki in the State Tretyakov Gallery" and "Peredvizhniki Landscape Art" exhibitions commemorating the Museum of Fine Arts' centennial. Evening Bells was shown at the "1000th Anniversary of Russian Artistic Culture" exhibition in Moscow, Hanover, and Wiesbaden in 1988. It was also included in the Levitan 150th-anniversary exhibition, which ran from October 2010 to March 2011 at the New Tretyakov Gallery on Krymsky Val.

== Description ==
Evening Bells depicts a monastery illuminated by the evening sun standing at a bend in the river. The monastery is surrounded by an autumnal forest, with clouds drifting across the sky, all reflected in the still flowing river's mirror-like surface. A high pre-sunset sky, clean and brightly reflected in the waters plays an important role in the composition of the image. Levitan's appreciation for the beauty and poetry of old churches is thought to have come from his teacher, Alexei Savrasov.

Evening Bells is built on horizontal lines that represent Russia's large plains, interrupted by a large depiction of water that reflects the sky. In this painting, Levitan used an impressionist palette and drew light with a poetic feeling. Crepuscular light dominates in this work, which according to art historian Mary Chamot, transforms the mundane into something unique in a magical twilight zone where darkness and light, reality and reflection, merge.

The monastery in Evening Bells, like in Quiet Abode, is behind the river, with a portion of the near bank visible in the foreground. In comparison to Quiet Abode, the river is wider and not crossed by a flimsy-looking wooden bridge. There is a small pier near the bank, as well as boats, including one carrying people down the river. The monastery buildings on the other side of the river are similar to those depicted in Quiet Abode, but they are less obstructed by trees—the ensemble appears to open to the viewer, and the path does not disappear into the bushes, but leads directly to the monastery gates.

The landscape surrounding the monastery is different from that of Quiet Abode. The river flows diagonally in Evening Bells, making a steep bend and passing behind the monastery, which, along with the grove surrounding it, appears to be situated on a bend. According to Fedorov-Davydov: "The greater spatiality of Evening Bells is striking, and it is reflected in the breadth and depth of the space of the new landscape and the diagonal dynamic asymmetry of the composition".

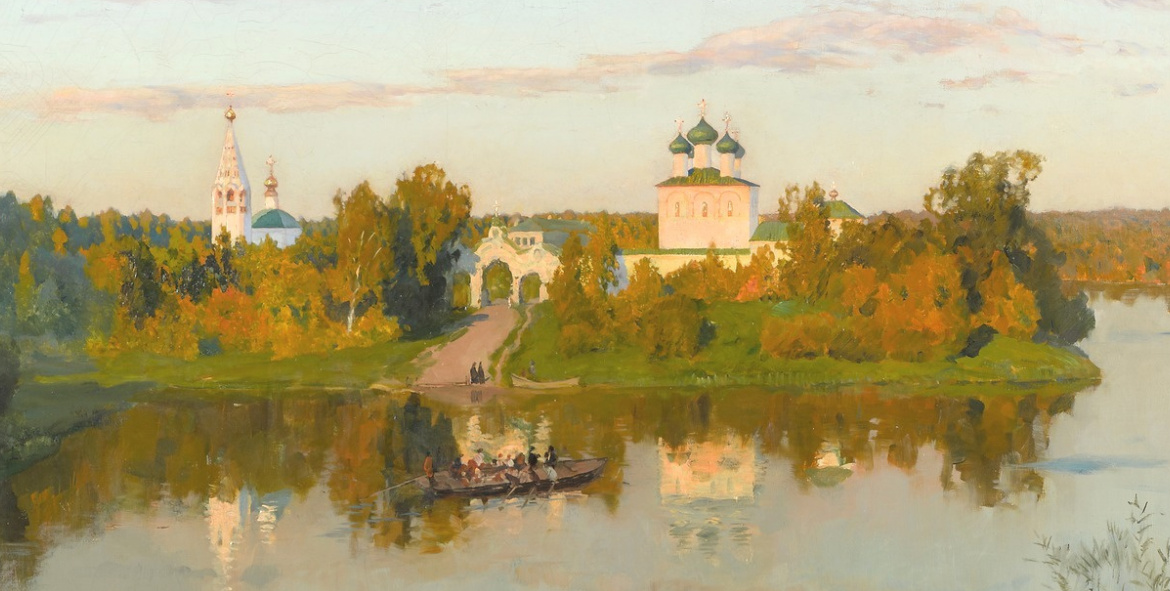
Monastery and the boat

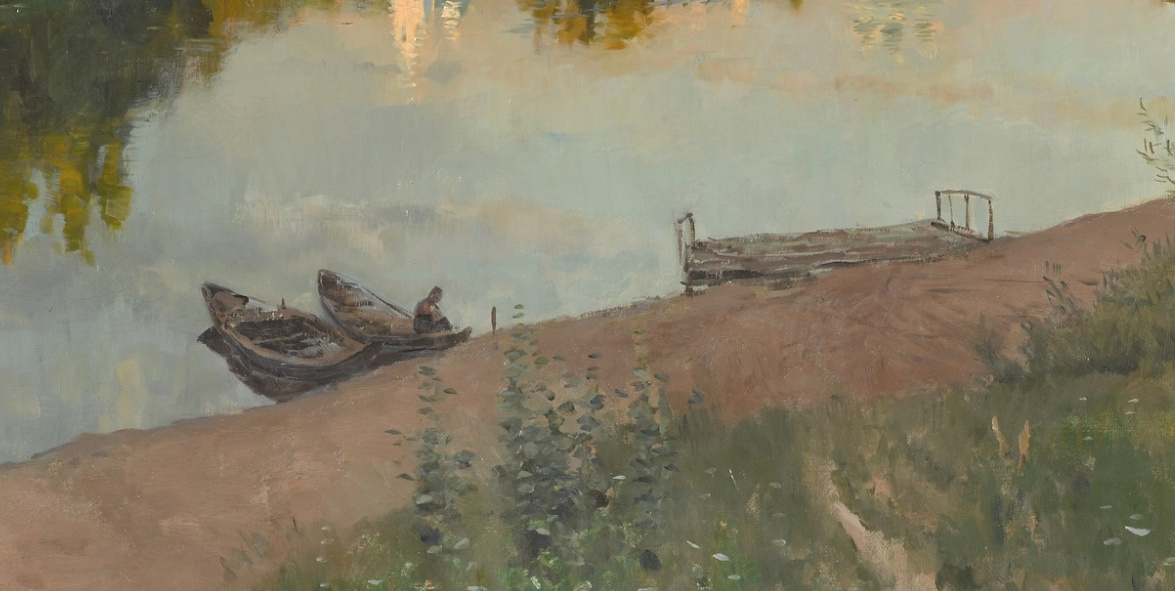
Boats near the shore and the pier

== Reception ==
When discussing the direction of Levitan's work in the late 1880s–early 1890s, Fedorov-Davydov noted that the constant search for "more and more new generalising images" was based on reflection. Following a holiday along the Volga River in 1889, Levitan created a number of the most literary and philosophical of his paintings in 1892—Evening Bells, By the Pool, Vladimirka and, finally, as a kind of synthesis, the painting Over Eternal Peace (1894). Calling Evening Bells a variation of Quiet Abode, Feodorov-Davydov acknowledged that the painting in 1892 Levitan made a decisive step towards the composed landscape: "This is his first landscape, which did not exist as such in nature". The landscape was created by the artist "from the combination of two natural images", according to Fedorov-Davydov, and Levitan was able to "masterfully combine these two motifs in his painting and achieve the impression of commonality and unity of image, the harmony of the parts as a whole".

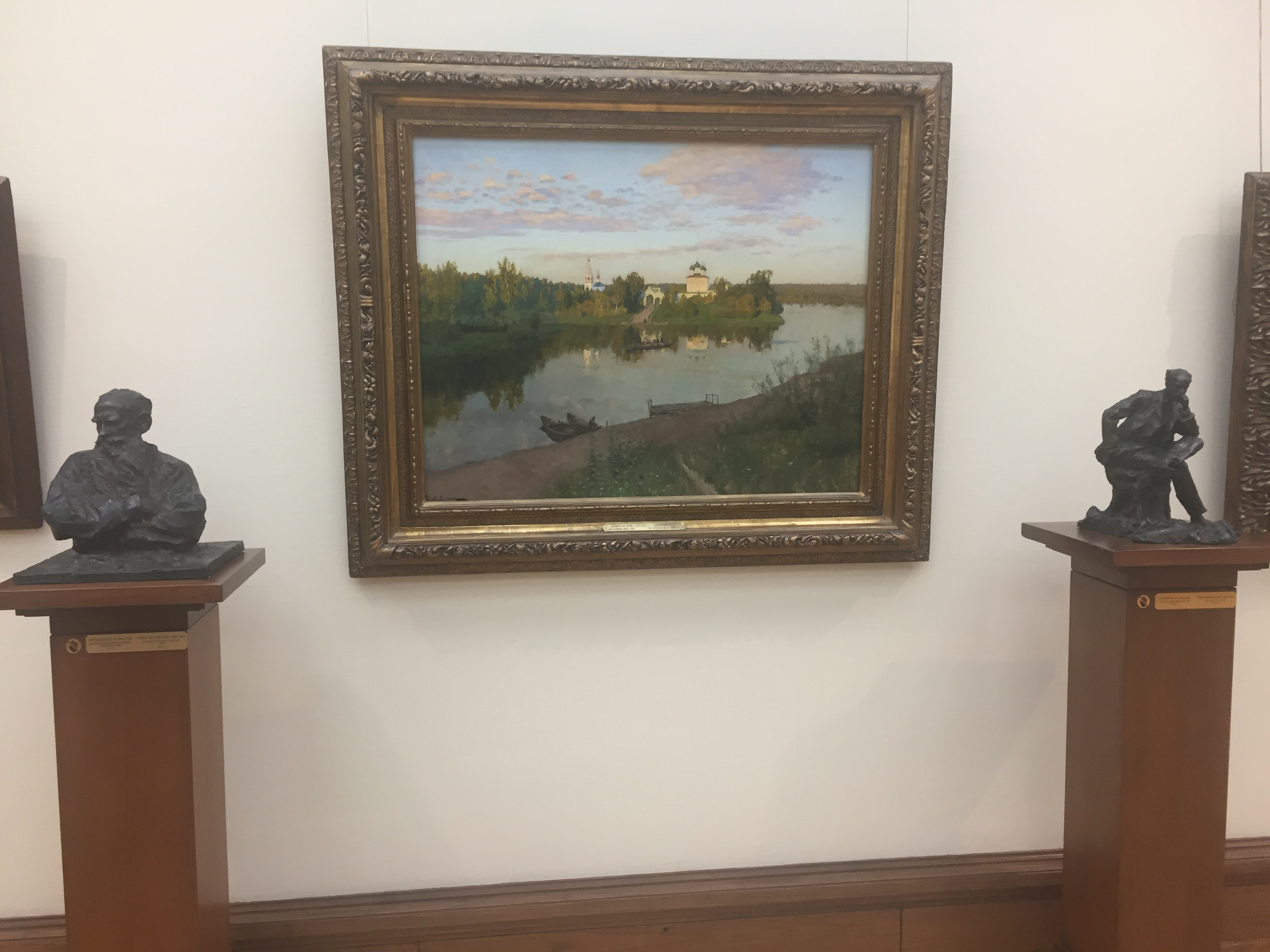
Evening Bells in the Levitanov Hall of the Tretyakov Gallery

Evening Bells, according to art historian Serafim Druzhinin, has "a light and peaceful feeling". Druzhinin wrote that Levitan succeeded in conveying "the feelings that one who subtly perceives nature might have, listening to the evening chime melting in the air" and feeling sad because life does not have the same harmony as nature does through the painting's harmonious combination of cool and warm tones.

Evening Bells, along with Levitan's earlier paintings Evening. Golden Plyos (1889) and Quiet Abode, were ranked by art historian Gleb Pospelov as important works representing the concept of an abode in the landscape art of Russian artists of the late 19th century. Pospelov defined abode as "a serene land, sheltered from storms, where the human soul not only thaws, but also germinates", and the motif of abode also included "a sense of the path to be crossed in order to reach a visible in the depths abode". According to Pospelov, the theme of approaching the abode is less prominent in Evening Bells, but the "impression of achieved silence" is more prominent than in the previous two paintings.

According to art historian Vladimir Petrov, the canvas Evening Bells, which "found soulful embodiment of deepest strings of poetic aspirations of the artist and his contemporaries", is "one of the most musical and perfect in its artistic structure" of Levitan works. Despite the fact that the painting Evening Bells is similar to the motif of Quiet Abode, Petrov noted that it is "nevertheless devoid of secondary character, has its own, unique charm". According to Petrov, Levitan achieves "even greater poetic scale than in Quiet Abode" in Evening Bells, owing primarily to the successful spatial solution.

== Literature ==
- Bruk, Yakov Vladimirovich; Iovleva, Lidiya Ivanovna (2001). Государственная Третьяковская галерея — каталог собрания [State Tretyakov Gallery – collection catalog] (in Russian). Vol. 4. Moscow: Krasnaya ploshad. ISBN 978-5-900743-56-1.
- Buladkova, Valentina (2007). Дворянские роды Псковской губернии. Материалы 1-й областной научно-практической конференции [Noble families of the Pskov province. Materials of the 1st regional scientific and practical conference] (in Russian). Pskov. pp. 74–80.
- Chamot, Mary (1963). Russian Painting and Sculpture. Oxford: Pergamon Press. ISBN 978-1-01-341043-7.
- Druzhinin, Serafim (1986). О русской и советской живописи: из творческого наследия [About Russian and Soviet painting: from the creative heritage] (in Russian). Leningrad: Artist of the RSFSR.
- Fedorov-Davydov, Aleksei (1966). Исаак Ильич Левитан: жизнь и творчество [Isaac Ilyich Levitan: life and work] (in Russian). Moscow: Iskusstvo.
- Fedorov-Davydov, Aleksei, ed. (1966). Исаак Ильич Левитан. Документы, материалы, библиография [Isaac Ilyich Levitan. Documents, materials, bibliography] (PDF) (in Russian). Moscow: Iskusstvo.
- Fedorov-Davydov, Aleksei (1975). "И. И. Левитан". Русское и советское искусство: статьи и очерки [Russian and Soviet art: articles and essays] (in Russian). Moscow: Iskusstvo. pp. 523–539.
- Fiala, Vladimir (1974). Русская живопись в собраниях Чехословакии [Russian painting in the collections of Czechoslovakia] (in Russian). Leningrad: Artist of the RSFSR.
- King, Averil (1 July 2014). "The wanderers' return". Apollo. 180 (622): 56–62.
- Petrov, Vladimir (1992). Исаак Ильич Левитан [Isaac Ilyich Levitan] (in Russian). Saint Petersburg: Artist of Russia. ISBN 978-5-7370-0212-1.
- Petrov, Vladimir (2000). Исаак Левитан [Isaac Levitan] (in Russian). Moscow: Beliy gorod. ISBN 978-5-7793-0250-0.
- Polonsky, Yakov (1890). Вечерний звон. Стихи 1887—1890 [Evening Bell. Poems 1887–1890] (in Russian). Saint Petersburg: A.S. Suvorin Printing House.
- Pospelov, Gleb (1997). "Мотив «приюта» в искусстве конца XIX — начале XX века". Русское искусство XIX века: вопросы понимания времени [Russian art of the 19th century: issues of understanding time] (in Russian). Moscow: Galart. pp. 255–261. ISBN 978-5-210-00921-0.
- Prorokova, Sofia (1960). Левитан [Levitan] (in Russian). Moscow: Molodaya gvardiya.
- Russia!: Nine Hundred Years of Masterpieces and Master Collections. New York: Guggenheim Museum. 2005. ISBN 978-0-89207-329-0.
- Sokolov, Alexander (2006). "Санкт-Петербург — Ленинград на Всемирных выставках в США" [St. Petersburg — Leningrad at the World Exhibitions in the USA]. Собор Лиц (in Russian). Saint Petersburg: 167–188. ISBN 978-5-288-04232-4.
- World's Columbian Exposition 1893, Chicago: Catalogue of the Russian Section. Saint Petersburg: Imperial Russian Commission. 1893.
