= Boris Prozorovsky =

Russian composer

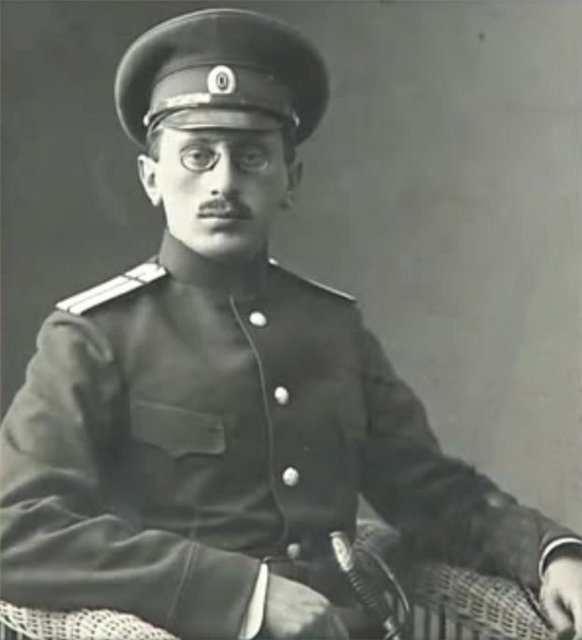
Boris Prozorovsky in 1916

Boris Alekseyevich Prozorovsky (Russian: Борис Алексеевич Прозоровский; 30 June 1891 in Saint Petersburg, Imperial Russia – 1937 in USSR) was a Russian composer and songwriter who specialized in the genre of Russian romance. Many of his best-known songs ("Rings" "Caravan", "Ships", among others) were originally performed by his protégé and one-time partner Tamara Tsereteli, who recorded some in 1927 (for the Muzpred/Muztrest record label), the year Prozorovsky's career reached its peak.

In 1929 the All-Russian Musicians Union's Conference declared the whole genre of Russian romance 'counter-revolutionary'. In 1930 Prozorovsky was arrested and spent three years in Gulag. After the release he continued to perform (now with pianist Daniil Olenin), but in 1937, at the height of the Great Purge, was arrested again and executed.
