= Turinsk =

Town in Sverdlovsk Oblast, Russia

Turinsk Туринск Йаңҡырцы
- Town
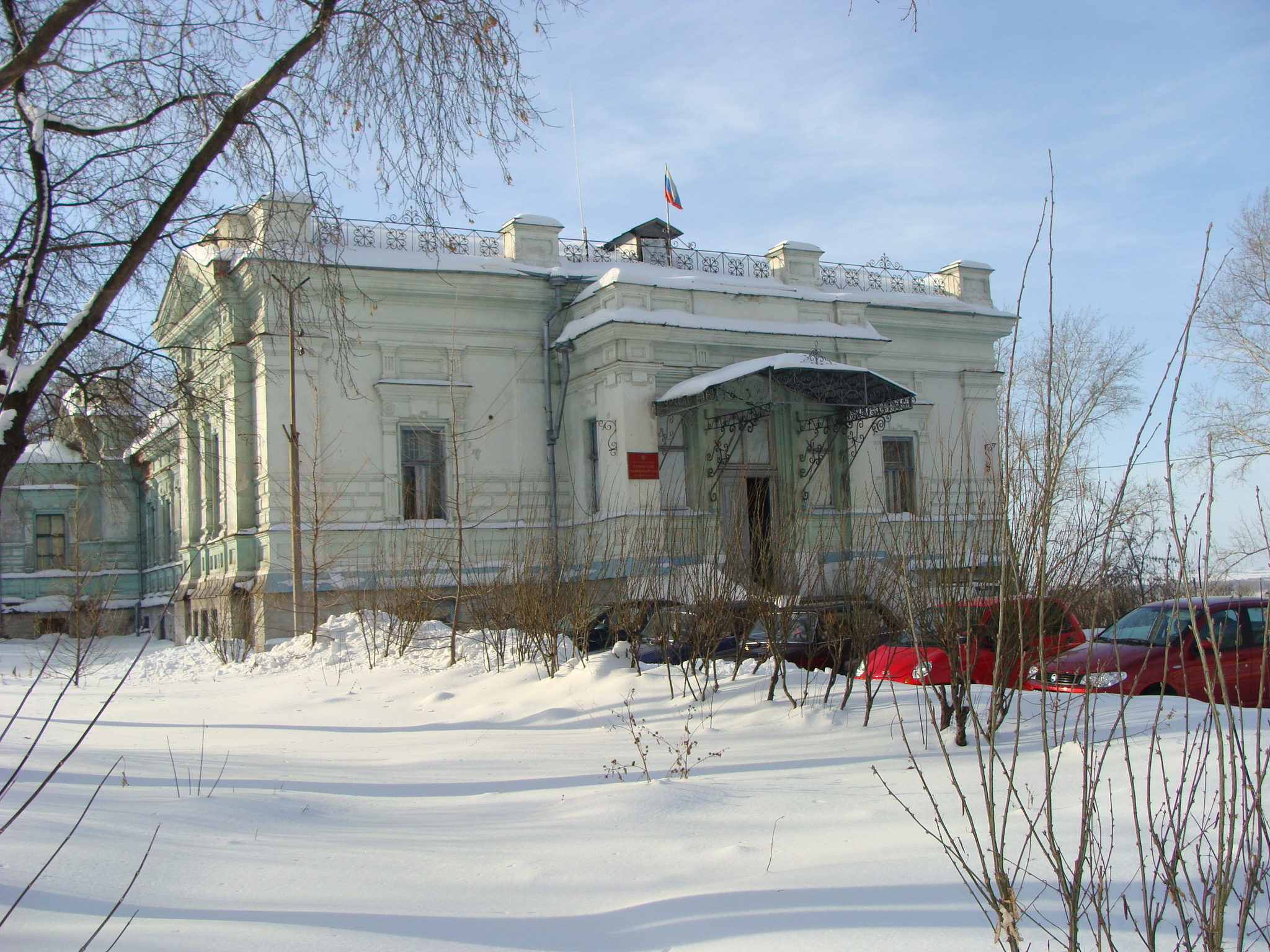
- House of Chirkov

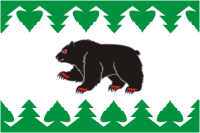
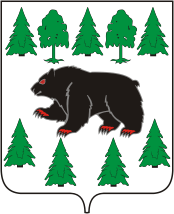
- Flag Coat of arms
- Interactive map of Turinsk
- Location of Turinsk Turinsk (Sverdlovsk Oblast)
- Coordinates: 58°02′00″N 63°42′00″E
- Country: Russia
- Federal subject: Sverdlovsk Oblast
- Founded: 1600
- Town status since: 1598

Area
  - Total: 28 km^{2} (11 sq mi)
- Elevation: 80 m (260 ft)

Population (2010 Census)
  - Total: 17,925
  - Estimate (2019): 17,060 (−4.8%)
  - Density: 640/km^{2} (1,700/sq mi)

Administrative status
  - Capital of: Turinsky District
- Time zone: UTC+5 (MSK+2)
- Postal code: 623900–623905
- OKTMO ID: 65726000001

Turinsk (Russian: Туринск; Siberian Tatar: Йаңҡырцы) is a town and the administrative center of Turinsky District of Sverdlovsk Oblast, Russia, located on the right bank of the Tura River midway between Verkhoturye and Tyumen, near its confluence with the Yarlynka, 253 kilometers (157 mi) northeast of Yekaterinburg. Population: 17,925 (2010 census); 19,313 (2002 census); 23,189 (1989 Soviet census).

== History ==
It was founded in 1600 as an ostrog in place of the ancient town of Yepanchin, which was razed by Yermak Timofeyevich in 1581.

== Climate ==
Climate data for Turinsk (extremes 1936-present)
Month	Jan	Feb	Mar	Apr	May	Jun	Jul	Aug	Sep	Oct	Nov	Dec	Year
Record high °C (°F)	6.2 (43.2)	10.0 (50.0)	18.0 (64.4)	31.1 (88.0)	36.1 (97.0)	36.6 (97.9)	37.3 (99.1)	36.2 (97.2)	31.0 (87.8)	24.7 (76.5)	14.2 (57.6)	6.4 (43.5)	37.3 (99.1)
Mean daily maximum °C (°F)	−11.6 (11.1)	−8.6 (16.5)	0.3 (32.5)	9.5 (49.1)	18.2 (64.8)	22.7 (72.9)	24.4 (75.9)	21.3 (70.3)	14.9 (58.8)	7.0 (44.6)	−3.8 (25.2)	−9.7 (14.5)	7.1 (44.7)
Daily mean °C (°F)	−15.5 (4.1)	−13.4 (7.9)	−5.1 (22.8)	3.7 (38.7)	11.4 (52.5)	16.4 (61.5)	18.3 (64.9)	15.5 (59.9)	9.5 (49.1)	2.8 (37.0)	−7.2 (19.0)	−13.2 (8.2)	1.9 (35.5)
Mean daily minimum °C (°F)	−19.4 (−2.9)	−17.8 (0.0)	−9.8 (14.4)	−1.3 (29.7)	5.3 (41.5)	10.6 (51.1)	12.9 (55.2)	10.7 (51.3)	5.4 (41.7)	−0.7 (30.7)	−10.5 (13.1)	−16.9 (1.6)	−2.6 (27.3)
Record low °C (°F)	−47.2 (−53.0)	−46.7 (−52.1)	−38.1 (−36.6)	−24.6 (−12.3)	−12.4 (9.7)	−5.9 (21.4)	2.4 (36.3)	−2.3 (27.9)	−6.9 (19.6)	−25.6 (−14.1)	−40.4 (−40.7)	−47.9 (−54.2)	−47.9 (−54.2)
Average precipitation mm (inches)	28.8 (1.13)	22.8 (0.90)	27.2 (1.07)	30.3 (1.19)	48.2 (1.90)	67.2 (2.65)	66.8 (2.63)	77.3 (3.04)	58.6 (2.31)	40.2 (1.58)	36.9 (1.45)	33.4 (1.31)	537.7 (21.16)
Source: pogoda.ru.net

== Notable people ==
- Konstantin Podrevsky, Soviet Russian poet, co-author of "Dorogoi dlinnoyu"
- Margarita Terekhova, Soviet and Russian actress
- Mikhail Rysev, mayor of Turinsk, and the Deputy of the Fourth Imperial Duma
