= Stardom Road =

Studio album by Marc Almond
- Released: 4 June 2007
- Recorded: Townhouse Studios, Olympic Studios, Angel Recording Studios, Strongroom Studios, M&I Recording Studios, Helicon Mountain Studios
- Genre: Pop
- Length: 54:15
- Label: Sanctuary
- Producers: Tris Penna, Marius de Vries

Marc Almond chronology
Heart on Snow (2003)	Stardom Road (2007)	Orpheus in Exile (2009)

Stardom Road is the thirteenth solo studio album by the British singer/songwriter Marc Almond. It was released by Sanctuary Records on 4 June 2007.

== Background ==
Stardom Road was Almond's first new album after his involvement in a near-fatal traffic accident in October 2004. It is an album composed mostly of cover versions, a fact borne out of necessity as Almond found himself unable to write following the accident. Almond told Time Out that the album is intended as "a trip down memory lane, a musical journey from the 1950s to where he finds himself today".

The album features collaborations with Sarah Cracknell, Anohni and Jools Holland, with some of the tracks also featuring members of Jools Holland's Rhythm and Blues Orchestra.

== Critical reception ==
Professional ratings
Review scores
Source	Rating
AllMusic	4.5/5 stars
Record Collector	3/5 stars
The Guardian	3/5 stars

The album was well received by critics overall. Thom Jurek in his AllMusic review calls Stardom Road Almond's "finest studio moment as a solo artist" and describes Almond's voice as having "never been less histrionic, yet more expressive". Record Collector critic Joel McIver calls Stardom Road "the campest album ever released" and summarises that it is "entertaining rather than cutting edge". The Manchester Evening News review notes the autobiographical concept and calls the album "a great comeback" that is "kitsch, camp, melodramatic, yet full of heartfelt emotion".

== Track listing ==
No.	Title	Writer(s)	Original Artist (and song)	Length
1.	"I Have Lived"	Charles Aznavour, Al Kasha, Joel Hirschhorn	Charles Aznavour	3:45
2.	"I Close My Eyes and Count to Ten" (featuring Sarah Cracknell)	Clive Westlake	Dusty Springfield – "I Close My Eyes and Count to Ten"	4:05
3.	"Bedsitter Images"	Al Stewart	Al Stewart	3:57
4.	"The London Boys"	David Bowie	David Bowie – "The London Boys"	3:28
5.	"Strangers in the Night"	Bert Kaempfert, Charles Singleton, Eddie Snyder	Frank Sinatra – "Strangers in the Night"	4:39
6.	"The Ballad of the Sad Young Men" (featuring Anohni)	Fran Landesman, Tommy Wolf	Roberta Flack	4:37
7.	"Stardom Road"	Terry Stamp, Jim Avery	Third World War	4:56
8.	"Kitsch"	Paul Ryan	Barry Ryan	5:30
9.	"Backstage (I'm Lonely)" (featuring Jools Holland & Kiki Dee)	Fred Anisfield, Willie Denson, Marc Almond	Gene Pitney	3:39
10.	"Dream Lover"	Bobby Darin	Bobby Darin – "Dream Lover"	3:24
11.	"Happy Heart"	James Last, Jackie Rae, Fred Weyrith	Andy Williams – "Happy Heart"	3:54
12.	"Redeem Me (Beauty Will Redeem the World)"	Almond, Marius de Vries	(not a cover version)	4:31
13.	"The Curtain Falls" (featuring Igor Outkine)	Sol Weinstein	Bobby Darin	3:10

== Personnel ==
- Marc Almond – vocals
- Trevor Barry – bass
- Chris Dagley – drums
- Robbie McIntosh – guitar, ukulele
- Mike Smith – piano, harpsichord, recorder
- Richard Henry – bass trombone
- Winston Rollins – trombone
- Dominic Glover – trumpet
- Chris Storr – trumpet
- David Powell – tuba
- John Anderson – oboe
- Marius de Vries – keyboards, programming
- Lenny Plaxico – bass
- Rob Burger – keyboards
- Hugh Webb – harp
- Andy Caine – backing vocals
- Andy Ross – backing vocals
- Anna Ross – backing vocals
- Jools Holland – piano
- Dave Swift – bass
- Gilson Lavis – drums
- Chris Holland – organ
- Neal Whitmore – guitar
- Igor Outkine – accordion
- Isobel Griffiths – string contractor
- Gavyn Wright – string leader

== Chart performance ==
Chart (2007)	Peak position
UK Albums (Official Charts)	53
