= Varieté (album) =

Studio album by Marc Almond
- Released: 7 June 2010
- Recorded: Dean Street Studios, Palace Studios (London)
- Genre: Pop
- Length: 66:19
- Label: Strike Force Entertainment, Cherry Red Records
- Producer: Marc Almond, Tris Penna

Marc Almond chronology
Orpheus in Exile (2009)	Varieté (2010)	Feasting with Panthers (2011)

Varieté is the fifteenth studio album by the British singer-songwriter Marc Almond. It was released on 7 June 2010 through Strike Force Entertainment, part of Cherry Red Records.

== Background ==
Varieté marks Almond's 30th year as a recording artist. It is his first album of original material in nine years. At the time of its release, Almond himself stated it would be his final album of original material as he had increasingly become more interested in recording pre-existing songs (as many of his covers albums have showcased), but this would prove to be untrue and he went on to record further original material afterwards. Much of it is self-produced and co-written with longtime collaborators Neal Whitmore and Martin Watkins.

The album was released in a standard one-disc jewel case and a limited edition two-disc digipak in a slip-sleeve version, featuring seven bonus tracks on the second disc.

== Critical reception ==
Professional ratings
Review scores
Source	Rating
AllMusic	3/5 stars
The Guardian	2/5 stars
The Daily Telegraph	3/5 stars
The Scotsman	3/5 stars
Daily Mirror	4/5 stars
Record Collector	3/5 stars

Varieté received mixed reviews from critics. The Guardian described a "nostalgic mood" but saw the album as "furrows already ploughed". The Daily Telegraph wrote about Almond's lyrics, stating that "his lyrical pen remains hilariously barbed", and called the album "self-composed cabaret sleaze". The review in The Scotsman agreed that Almond is looking back with this album, returning "to old themes with alacrity", and summarised by calling Varieté "mischievous, lightweight fun compared to Almond's darker, more tortured journeys into European chanson". Simon Price in his review from The Independent called the album "an autobiography and also a hymn to the underground" and stated that Almond "is determined to squeeze life for its every last drop". The AllMusic review praised the production as flowing "freely from spare, late-night-in-the-cocktail-lounge settings to big, bold, orchestral statements". It also had further commentary on the bonus tracks available with the limited-edition version of the album, stating that the "more minimal, acoustic-based" songs shine "a brighter light on Almond's songwriting abilities".

== Track listing ==
1. "(Intro)" (Marc Almond, Michael Cashmore) – 0:42
2. "Bread & Circus" (Almond, Alexei Fedorov) – 3:47
3. "Nijinsky Heart" (Almond, Roland Faber) – 3:59
4. "The Exhibitionist" (Almond, Martin Watkins) – 4:44
5. "The Trials of Eyeliner" (Almond, Michael Cashmore) – 5:44
6. "Lavender" (Almond, Watkins) – 5:25
7. "Soho So Long" (Almond, Fedorov, Neal Whitmore) – 3:37
8. "Unloveable" (Almond, Faber) – 2:47
9. "Sandboy" (Almond, Watkins) – 4:41
10. "It's All Going On" (Almond, Faber) – 4:32
11. "Variety" (Almond, Faber) – 3:31
12. "Cabaret Clown" (Almond) – 3:09
13. "My Madness and I" (Almond, Whitmore) – 4:34
14. "But Not Today" (Almond, Whitmore) – 4:29
15. "Swan Song" (Almond, Whitmore) – 3:41
16. "Sin Song" (Almond, Cashmore) – 7:03

== Bonus acoustic disc (Limited edition) ==
1. "My Evil Twin" (Almond, Faber) – 3:13
2. "A Lonely Love" (Almond) – 3:35
3. "Cat Dancer" (Almond, Whitmore) – 2:23
4. "Criminal Lover" (Almond, Whitmore) – 3:17
5. "I Am No One" (Almond, Whitmore) – 2:35
6. "Smoke" (Almond, Whitmore) – 3:11
7. "Kiss the Ghost (Goodbye)" (Almond) – 4:45

== Personnel ==
- Marc Almond – vocals, arrangement
- Neal Whitmore – electric and acoustic guitar, ukulele, piano, harmonica, Omnichord, arrangement
- Martin Watkins – piano, keyboards, Omnichord, arrangement
- Dave Ruffy – drums, percussion, bongos, spoons, drum machine
- Carl Holt – electric and acoustic bass

Guest musicians

- Armen Ra – theremin
- David Coulter – musical saw
- Andy Marlowe – additional guitar
- Roland Faber – Moog, analogue synths, simulated Martenot, Mellotron
- Seamus Beaghen – Hammond organ
- Thomas Bowles – clarinet
- Igor Outkine (from band Mazaika) – Bayan accordion
- Sarah Harrison (from band Mazaika) – violin
- Gemma Rosefield – cello
- Daisy Gathorne-Hardy – cello
- Sarah McMahon – cello
- Maria Martinez – cello
- Debs White – violin
- Tamsin Waley-Cohen – violin
- Tom Hankey – viola
- James Knight – saxophone
- Dominic Glover – trumpet
- Nichol Thomson – trombone
- Richard Shaw – cornet
- Lucy Jackson – cornet
- Tracy Colston – tenor horn
- Jonathon Ford – Euphonium
- Tris Penna – string synthesizer
