= Konstantin Podrevsky =

Russian Soviet poet of Polish origin

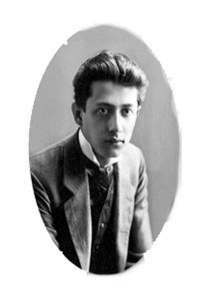
- Born: Константин Николаевич Подревский; 14 January 1888; Turinsk, Tobolsk Governorate, Russian Empire, Moscow, Russian Empire
- Died: 4 February 1930 (aged 42); Moscow, USSR
- Occupations: poet, translator, lyricist
- Years active: 1910–1929
- Spouse(s): Vera Mikulina (1910–1922), Anna Lyamina

Konstantin Nikolayevich Podrevsky (Russian: Константин Николаевич Подревский; 14 January 1888 in Turinsk, Tobolsk Governorate, Russian Empire – 4 February 1930 in Moscow, USSR) was a Russian Soviet poet of Polish origin on mother's side, a translator and lyricist, co-author of more than 150 popular songs of the 1920s, including "Dorogoi dlinnoyu", which he wrote with composer Boris Fomin.

== Biography ==
Konstantin Podrevsky was born in Turinsk, Tobolsk, to Nikolai Nikolayevich Podrevsky (1855–1916), a Russian raznochinets (later journalist and editor of Sibirsky Listok newspaper), and Zoya Ignatyevna, (born Vincentina Wilhelmina Lisowska, 1862–1925?), a daughter of the Polish revolutionaries who were deported to the Siberia after the 1863 Uprising. In Astrakhan, where the family settled after having received the permission to return from Siberia, Konstantin joined the city's First Gymnasium. After graduation in 1906 he enrolled into the Kiev University's law faculty. It was in Kiev that he debuted as a published poet, in the local Student Almanac magazine.

In 1914 Podrevsky moved to Moscow and a year later enlisted as a private, to be posted to the World War I battlefields. Demobilized in 1917, he settled at the Arbat, and moved into a bohemian circle of friends, among them poet Andrey Bely. In 1922 Podrevsky became a professional poet and lyricist and a year later joined the Dramsoyuz (Dramatists Union), starting the artistic partnership with his new friend there, Boris Fomin. Among this tandem's most popular songs was "Dorogoi dlinnoyu" (1924), arguably, the most famous 20th century Russian romance.

In 1929 the First All-Russian Musicians Conference pronounced the whole genre of the Russian romance 'counter-revolutionary'. Podrevsky's best known songs were banned, and he was personally attacked in the press as a 'NEPman stooge'. The same year Podrevsky failed to forward a declaration to his local tax authorities, and all of his family's property was seized. He suffered a severe shock and, as a result, a fatal nervous breakdown.

Konstantin Podrevsky died on 4 February 1930. He is interred in Donskoye Cemetery's columbarium in Moscow.

In the early 2010s, selected poems by K.N. Podrevsky were published in Russia for the first time, by Vodolay Publishing House.

== Private life ==
In 1910 Konstantin Podrevsky married his first wife Vera Alexandrovna Mikulina (1885—1956). A niece of the scientist Nikolai Zhukovsky, she was a poet who published as 'Vera Zhukovskaya'. They divorced in 1920.

Podrevsky's second wife was Anna Ivanovna Lyamina (née Stepanova, 1898–1974). Andrey Glebovich Lyamin was her son from the first marriage. It was the latter's granddaughter Maria Filina who in the 2010 passed the poet's archives to the Vodolei Publishers which resulted in the publication of the Selected Poems by K.N. Podrevsky.
