= Tamara Tsereteli =

Tamara Semyonovna Tsereteli
- Born: თამარ წერეთელი Тамара Семёновна Церетели; 14 August 1900; Kutais Governorate, Georgia, Russian Empire
- Died: 3 April 1968 (aged 67); Moscow, USSR
- Education: Tbilisi State University
- Occupation: singer
- Years active: 1923-1960

Tamara Semyonovna Tsereteli (Georgian: თამარ წერეთელი, Russian: Тама́ра Семёновна Церете́ли, 14 August 1900, in Sveri, Kutais Governorate, Georgia, Russian Empire – 3 April 1968, in Moscow, USSR) was a Georgian Russian singer, contralto, who specialized in the Russian romance and was the first to record in 1925 Boris Fomin's "Dorogoi dlinnoyu".

In the 1920s the singer's repertoire consisted largely of the songs written for, and dedicated to her by her mentor and partner Boris Prozorovsky, a prominent romance author, arrested in 1933 and executed in 1937 during the Great Purge. Tsereteli who gave more than 5500 concerts in her lifetime, retired in 1960.
