= Mikhail Rysev =

Mikhail Rysev Russian: Михаил Ры́сев
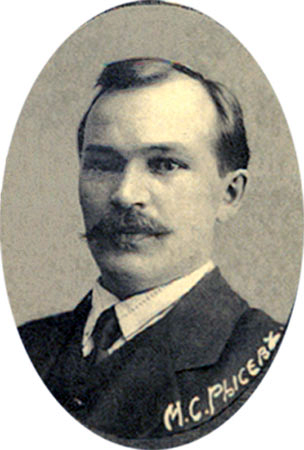
- photo of 1913

Deputy of the Fourth Imperial Duma
- In office 20 November 1912 – 6 October 1917
- Monarch: Nicholas II / monarchy abolished
- Succeeded by: post abolished

Personal details
- Born: Mikhail Stepanovich Rysev; 1881 Turinsk, Tobolsk Governorate, Russian Empire
- Died: after October 1917
- Party: Trudoviks

Mikhail Stepanovich Rysev (Russian: Михаи́л Степа́нович Ры́сев; 1881 in Turinsk, Tobolsk Governorate – after October 1917) was a peasant, an owner of a tannery, a mayor of Turinsk (1911—1912) and a deputy of the Fourth Imperial Duma from Tobolsk Governorate between 1912 and 1917. He became a member of three Duma commissions: land, food and fishery; he was also a member of the Siberian parliamentary group.

== Literature ==
- Николаев А. Б. Рысев Михаил Степанович (in Russian) // Государственная дума Российской империи: 1906—1917 / Б. Ю. Иванов, А. А. Комзолова, И. С. Ряховская. — Москва: РОССПЭН, 2008. — P. 540. — 735 p. — ISBN 978-5-8243-1031-3.
- Рысев (in Russian) // Члены Государственной думы (портреты и биографии): Четвертый созыв, 1912—1917 г. / сост. М. М. Боиович. — Москва: Тип. Т-ва И. Д. Сытина, 1913. — P. 436. — LXIV, 454, [2] p.
- Павлова С. Первые представители Тобольской губернии в Государственной думе // Тюменские Известия: парламентская газета. — Тюмень, 2013. — 13 июля (№ 119). (in Russian)
