= List of Cash Box Top 100 number-one singles of 1968 =

These are the number-one singles of 1968 according to the Top 100 Singles chart in Cashbox magazine.

Issue date	Song	Artist
January 6	"Hello, Goodbye"	The Beatles
January 13	"I Heard It Through The Grapevine"	Gladys Knight & the Pips
January 20	"Chain Of Fools"	Aretha Franklin
January 27	"Judy in Disguise (With Glasses)"	John Fred And His Playboy Band
February 3	"Green Tambourine"	The Lemon Pipers
February 10	"Love is Blue"	Paul Mauriat
February 17	"Love is Blue"	Paul Mauriat
February 24	"Love is Blue"	Paul Mauriat
March 2	"Love is Blue"	Paul Mauriat
March 9	"Love is Blue"	Paul Mauriat
March 16	"Love is Blue"	Paul Mauriat
March 23	"Love is Blue"	Paul Mauriat
March 30	"Valleri"	The Monkees
April 6	"Valleri"	The Monkees
April 13	"Young Girl"	Gary Puckett & The Union Gap
April 20	"Honey"	Bobby Goldsboro
April 27	"Honey"	Bobby Goldsboro
May 4	"Honey"	Bobby Goldsboro
May 11	"Honey"	Bobby Goldsboro
May 18	"Tighten Up"	Archie Bell & the Drells
May 25	"Mrs. Robinson"	Simon and Garfunkel
June 1	"Mrs. Robinson"	Simon and Garfunkel
June 8	"Mrs. Robinson"	Simon and Garfunkel
June 15	"Mrs. Robinson"	Simon and Garfunkel
June 22	"This Guy's in Love with You"	Herb Alpert
June 29	"This Guy's in Love with You"	Herb Alpert
July 6	"This Guy's in Love with You"	Herb Alpert
July 13	"This Guy's in Love with You"	Herb Alpert
July 20	"Jumpin' Jack Flash"	The Rolling Stones
July 27	"Grazing in the Grass"	Hugh Masekela
August 3	"Lady Willpower"	Gary Puckett & The Union Gap
August 10	"Classical Gas"	Mason Williams
August 17	"Hello, I Love You"	The Doors
August 24	"People Got to Be Free"	The Rascals
August 31	"People Got to Be Free"	The Rascals
September 7	"People Got to Be Free"	The Rascals
September 14	"Harper Valley PTA"	Jeannie C. Riley
September 21	"Hey Jude"	The Beatles
September 28	"Hey Jude"	The Beatles
October 5	"Hey Jude"	The Beatles
October 12	"Hey Jude"	The Beatles
October 19	"Hey Jude"	The Beatles
October 26	"Hey Jude"	The Beatles
November 2	"Hey Jude"	The Beatles
November 9	"Those Were the Days"	Mary Hopkin
November 16	"Those Were the Days"	Mary Hopkin
November 23	"Love Child"	Diana Ross & the Supremes
November 30	"Love Child"	Diana Ross & the Supremes
December 7	"Love Child"	Diana Ross & the Supremes
December 14	"For Once in My Life"	Stevie Wonder
December 21	"I Heard It Through the Grapevine"	Marvin Gaye
December 28	"I Heard It Through the Grapevine"	Marvin Gaye

== See also ==
- 1968 in music
- List of Hot 100 number-one singles of 1968 (U.S.)
