= 3669 Vertinskij =

Florian asteroid

Discovery
- Discovered by: L. G. Karachkina
- Discovery site: Crimean Astrophysical Obs.
- Discovery date: 21 October 1982

Designations
- Named after: Alexander Vertinsky (Russian artist)
- Alternative designations: 1982 UO_{7} · 1972 TE_{2} 1972 XD · 1980 BG_{3} 1984 KJ
- Minor planet category: main-belt · (inner); Flora

Orbital characteristics
- Epoch 23 March 2018 (JD 2458200.5)
- Uncertainty parameter 0
- Observation arc: 67.54 yr (24,668 d)
- Aphelion: 2.3704 AU
- Perihelion: 2.0574 AU
- Semi-major axis: 2.2139 AU
- Eccentricity: 0.0707
- Orbital period (sidereal): 3.29 yr (1,203 d)
- Mean anomaly: 201.67°
- Mean motion: 0° 17^{m} 57.12^{s} / day
- Inclination: 4.8271°
- Longitude of ascending node: 90.940°
- Argument of perihelion: 34.832°

Physical characteristics
- Mean diameter: 6.243±0.087 km 6.467±0.059 km 6.51 km (calculated)
- Synodic rotation period: inconclusive
- Geometric albedo: 0.2229±0.0273; 0.238±0.008; 0.24 (assumed)
- Spectral type: SMASS = S
- Absolute magnitude (H): 13.1; 13.2; 13.50±0.21

3669 Vertinskij, provisional designation 1982 UO_{7}, is a stony Florian asteroid from the inner regions of the asteroid belt, approximately 6.5 kilometers (4 miles) in diameter. It was discovered on 21 October 1982, by Soviet astronomer Lyudmila Karachkina at the Crimean Astrophysical Observatory in Nauchnij, on the Crimean peninsula. The S-type asteroid was named for Russian artist Alexander Vertinsky.

== Orbit and classification ==
Vertinskij is a member of the Flora family (402), a giant asteroid family and the largest family of stony asteroids in the main-belt. It orbits the Sun in the inner asteroid belt at a distance of 2.1–2.4 AU once every 3 years and 3 months (1,203 days; semi-major axis of 2.21 AU). Its orbit has an eccentricity of 0.07 and an inclination of 5° with respect to the ecliptic.

The body's observation arc begins with a precovery taken at the Palomar Observatory in November 1949, nearly 33 years prior to its official discovery observation at Nauchnij.

== Physical characteristics ==
In the SMASS classification, Vertinskij is a common stony S-type asteroid.

=== Rotation period ===
In December 2015, photometric observations of Vertinskij at the Oakley Southern Sky Observatory gave no conclusive results due to excessive noise and/or insufficient data. As of 2018, the body's rotation period, pole and shape remain unknown.

=== Diameter and albedo ===
According to the survey carried out by the NEOWISE mission of NASA's Wide-field Infrared Survey Explorer, Vertinskij measures between 6.243 and 6.467 kilometers in diameter and its surface has an albedo between 0.2229 and 0.238, while the Collaborative Asteroid Lightcurve Link assumes an albedo of 0.24 – derived from 8 Flora, the parent body of the Flora family – and calculates a diameter of 6.51 kilometers based on an absolute magnitude of 13.1.

== Naming ==
This minor planet was named after Russian artist and poet Alexander Vertinsky (1889–1957). The official naming citation was published by the Minor Planet Center on 12 September 1992 (M.P.C. 20836).
