= Oleg Pogudin =

Russian singer, TV presenter and actor (born 1968)

Oleg Pogudin Олег Погудин
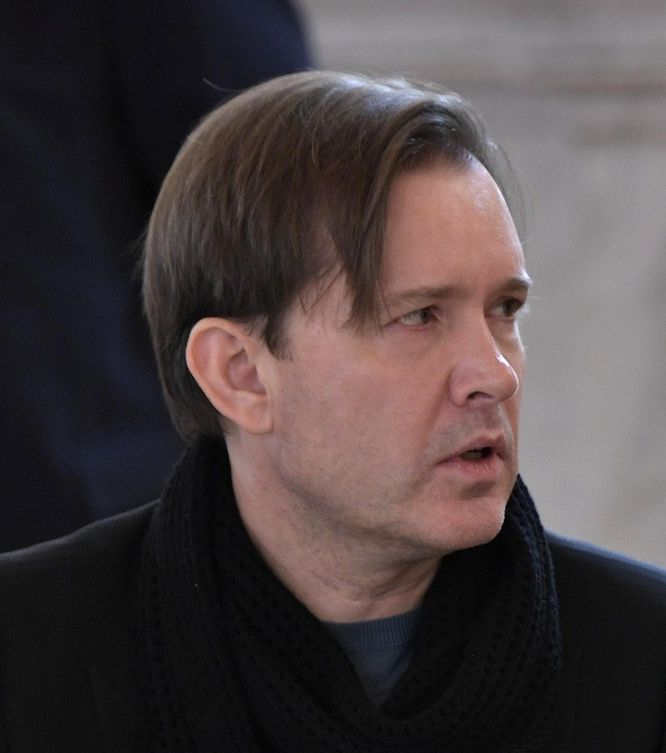
- Pogudin in 2017

Background information
- Born: 22 December 1968 (age 57); Leningrad, Soviet Union
- Genres: Folk; Russian romance
- Occupations: Vocalist; actor
- Instrument: Vocals
- Years active: 1979–present
- Website: www.pogudin.ru

Oleg Evgenevich Pogudin (Russian: Оле́г Евге́ньевич Погу́дин; born 22 December 1968) is a Russian singer, TV presenter and actor. He is noted for his vocal and artistic style of interpretation of Russian romances and traditional folk songs.

== Biography ==
From 1979 till 1982 he was a soloist of the children's choir of Leningrad radio and television studio. In 1985-1990 he studied at the Russian State Institute of Performing Arts and graduated with an honorable diploma.

In 1990-1993 Pogudin worked as an actor in St. Petersburg. His first LP, Zvezda Lubvi (The Star of Love), was released in 1991. Since 1993 Pogudin has been constantly touring in Russia and abroad.

Pogudin works with regional radio and television studios on a regular basis. In 1993-1996 Russian television aired ten musical films featuring Pogudin.

There are more than five hundred songs and romances in Pogudin's repertoire, mainly old classical and 'urban' Russian romances; folk songs; war-time ballads and old military marches, songs based on works of foreign authors. He also performs monographic concerts devoted to Alexander Vertinsky, Pyotr Leshchenko and Bulat Okudzhava.

Pogudin has been working on a project called To a Russian Genius — a chamber music vocal series based on the 19th and early 20th century Russian poets' works.

== Awards and honours ==
- 2003: Medal "In Commemoration of the 300th Anniversary of Saint Petersburg"
- 2004: Honoured Artist of the Russian Federation
- 2015: People's Artist of Russia
