= List of Oricon number-one singles of 1969 =

The highest-selling singles in Japan are ranked in the Oricon Singles Chart, which is published by Oricon Style magazine. The data are compiled by Oricon based on each singles' physical sales. This list includes the singles that reached the number one place on that chart in 1969.

== Oricon Weekly Singles Chart ==
Issue date	Song	Artist(s)	Ref.
January 6	"Koi no Kisetsu"	Pinky & Killers	
January 13	"Koi no Kisetsu"	Pinky & Killers	
January 20	"Koi no Kisetsu"	Pinky & Killers	
January 27	"Those Were the Days"; Japanese title: "Kanashiki Tenshi" (悲しき天使; lit. "Sad Angel")	Mary Hopkin	
February 3	"Namida no Kisetsu"	Pinky & Killers	
February 10	"Blue Light Yokohama"	Ayumi Ishida	
February 17	"Blue Light Yokohama"	Ayumi Ishida	
February 24	"Blue Light Yokohama"	Ayumi Ishida	
March 3	"Blue Light Yokohama"	Ayumi Ishida	
March 10	"Blue Light Yokohama"	Ayumi Ishida	
March 17	"Blue Light Yokohama"	Ayumi Ishida	
March 24	"Blue Light Yokohama"	Ayumi Ishida	
March 31	"Blue Light Yokohama"	Ayumi Ishida	
April 7	"Blue Light Yokohama"	Ayumi Ishida	
April 14	"Yoake no Scat"	Saori Yuki	
April 21	"Yoake no Scat"	Saori Yuki	
April 28	"Yoake no Scat"	Saori Yuki	
May 5	"Yoake no Scat"	Saori Yuki	
May 12	"Yoake no Scat"	Saori Yuki	
May 19	"Yoake no Scat"	Saori Yuki	
May 26	"Yoake no Scat"	Saori Yuki	
June 2	"Yoake no Scat"	Saori Yuki	
June 9	"Minatomachi Blues"	Shinichi Mori	
June 16	"Minatomachi Blues"	Shinichi Mori	
June 23	"Minatomachi Blues"	Shinichi Mori	
June 30	"Minatomachi Blues"	Shinichi Mori	
July 7	"Minatomachi Blues"	Shinichi Mori	
June 14	"Kinjirareta Koi"	Ryoko Moriyama	
June 21	"Kinjirareta Koi"	Ryoko Moriyama	
June 28	"Kinjirareta Koi"	Ryoko Moriyama	
August 4	"Kinjirareta Koi"	Ryoko Moriyama	
August 11	"Kinjirareta Koi"	Ryoko Moriyama	
August 18	"Kinjirareta Koi"	Ryoko Moriyama	
August 25	"Kinjirareta Koi"	Ryoko Moriyama	
September 1	"Kinjirareta Koi"	Ryoko Moriyama	
September 8	"Ikebukuro no Yoru"	Mina Aoe	
September 15	"Ikebukuro no Yoru"	Mina Aoe	
September 22	"Ikebukuro no Yoru"	Mina Aoe	
September 29	"Ikebukuro no Yoru"	Mina Aoe	
October 6	"Ikebukuro no Yoru"	Mina Aoe	
October 13	"Ikebukuro no Yoru"	Mina Aoe	
October 20	"Ningyō no Ie"	Mieko Hirota	
October 27	"Ningyō no Ie"	Mieko Hirota	
November 3	"Ningyō no Ie"	Mieko Hirota	
November 10	"Kuroneko no Tango"	Osamu Minagawa	
November 17	"Kuroneko no Tango"	Osamu Minagawa	
November 24	"Kuroneko no Tango"	Osamu Minagawa	
December 1	"Kuroneko no Tango"	Osamu Minagawa	
December 8	"Kuroneko no Tango"	Osamu Minagawa	
December 15	"Kuroneko no Tango"	Osamu Minagawa	
December 22	"Kuroneko no Tango"	Osamu Minagawa	
December 29	"Kuroneko no Tango"	Osamu Minagawa	

== See also ==
- 1969 in Japanese music
