= Those Were the Days (Gene Raskin song) =

Song composed by Gene Raskin and Boris Fomin

- A-side label of UK single

Single by Mary Hopkin

from the album Post Card
- B-side: "Turn! Turn! Turn!"
- Released: 30 August 1968
- Genre: Folk
- Length: 5:05
- Label: Apple
- Songwriters: Boris Fomin; Gene Raskin
- Producer: Paul McCartney

Mary Hopkin singles chronology
"Those Were the Days" (1968)	"Goodbye" (1969)

"Those Were The Days"

Single by Sandie Shaw
- B-side: "Make It Go"
- Released: 1968
- Genre: Easy listening
- Length: 3:50
- Label: Pye
- Songwriters: Boris Fomin; Gene Raskin

Sandie Shaw singles chronology
"Together" (1968)	"Those Were The Days" (1968)	"Monsieur Dupont" (1969)

"Those Were the Days" is a popular song, with lyrics by Gene Raskin set to the Russian romance song "Dorogoi Dlinnoyu", (Note: Russian: Дорогой длинною, IPA: [dɐˈroɡəj ˈdlʲinːəjʊ], lit. 'By the Long Road'.) by Boris Fomin. It is a reminiscence of youth and romantic idealism, recalling drinking, singing, and dancing in a tavern with a friend, imagining a rosy future that has not been fulfilled.

The first recording of Those Were the Days was released in 1962 by the American folk trio The Limeliters. The Welsh singer Mary Hopkin recorded "Those Were the Days" as her debut single in 1968. Produced by Paul McCartney of the Beatles and arranged by Richard Hewson, the song became a number-one hit in the UK and Canada, and reached number two in the US on the Billboard Hot 100 behind the Beatles' "Hey Jude". It was number one in the first edition of the French National Hit Parade launched by the Centre d'Information et de Documentation du Disque. The song was included on Hopkin's 1969 debut album, Post Card.

== History ==
=== Dorogoi Dlinnoyu ===
Dorogoi Dlinnoyu ("By the Long Road") was composed in 1924 with music by Boris Fomin and lyrics by the poet Konstantin Podrevsky.

Georgian singer Tamara Tsereteli (1900–1968) and Russian singer Alexander Vertinsky made what were probably the earliest recordings of the song, in 1925 and 1926 respectively. The song appears in the 1953 British/French movie Innocents in Paris, sung by the Russian Roma chanteuse Ludmila Lopato.

=== Those Were the Days ===
In the early 1960s, Raskin and his wife Francesca played folk music in venues around Greenwich Village in New York, including the White Horse Tavern. Raskin, who had grown up hearing Dorogoi Dlinnoyu, wrote English-language lyrics to it. Raskin copyrighted both the music and lyrics in his own name, though he had created only the lyrics.

The Limeliters released a recording of the song on their 1962 LP Folk Matinee.

The Raskins were international performers and had played at London's Blue Angel club every year, always closing their show with the song. Paul McCartney frequented the club and, being quite taken with the song, attempted unsuccessfully to get several singers and groups, including the early Moody Blues, to record it. After the formation of the Beatles' own Apple Records label, McCartney recorded Mary Hopkin performing the song at Abbey Road Studios in London. He said later, "I thought it was very catchy, it had something, it was a good treatment of nostalgia... (Hopkin) picked it up very easily, as if she'd known it for years." McCartney had the idea to use a cymbalom as one of the main instruments backing the recording. The song was eventually recorded in over twenty languages and by many different artists.

Mary Hopkin's 1968 recording, with Gene Raskin's lyric, was a chart-topping hit worldwide. On most recordings of the song, Raskin is credited as the sole writer, even though he wrote only the English-language lyrics, which are not a translation of the Russian lyrics, and not the music.

Hopkin's recording was produced by McCartney with an arrangement by Richard Hewson, in his first arrangement of a pop song. It became a number-one hit on the UK Singles Chart. In the United States, it reached number two on the Billboard Hot 100 (held out of the top spot for three weeks by the Beatles' "Hey Jude") and topped the Billboard Easy Listening charts for six weeks. In the Netherlands, it topped the charts for two consecutive weeks. The B-side of the record in the UK and the United States was a cover of Pete Seeger's "Turn! Turn! Turn!" which had been a US number-one hit for the Byrds in 1965.

The Russian origin of the melody was accentuated by instrumentation that was unusual for a top-ten pop record, including balalaika, clarinet, hammered dulcimer or cimbalom, tenor banjo, and a children's choir, giving a klezmer feel to the song. The cimbalom was played by Gilbert Webster. Hopkin said in 2015, "I did not play guitar on 'Those Were the Days.' Paul played acoustic guitar."

McCartney also recorded Hopkin singing "Those Were the Days" in other languages for release in Spain (Qué tiempo tan feliz); in West Germany (An jenem Tag); in Italy (Quelli erano giorni); and in France (Le temps des fleurs). The non-English lyrics were also recorded by Gigliola Cinquetti, Dalida, and Sandie Shaw.

"Those Were the Days" was given catalogue number APPLE 2. The APPLE 1 number had been taken by an unreleased version of Frank Sinatra's "The Lady Is a Tramp", which was recorded in 1968 for Maureen Starkey's 22nd birthday as a gift from Ringo Starr, under the name "The Lady is a Champ". It was the second single to be released on the Apple label; the first, "Hey Jude" by the Beatles, had retained the catalogue numbers used by Parlophone in the UK and Capitol in the US.

Hopkin's version was released following her success on the UK television talent show Opportunity Knocks. Around the time of its release, popular singer Sandie Shaw was also asked to record the song by her management. Shaw's version was released as a single, but did not match the success of Hopkin's version.

American singer Connie Francis sang the song on the Ed Sullivan Show on April 27, 1969, together with "The House I Live In". The performance was quite different from her other ones because the audience participated in the song. It was the second time she had sung the other song on the show.

In the mid-1970s, after Hopkin's contract with Apple had ended, "Those Were the Days" and "Goodbye" were re-recorded with producer Tony Visconti, whom Hopkin had married in 1971.

On 25 October 2010, Apple Records released Come and Get It: The Best of Apple Records, which included the original recordings of "Those Were the Days" and "Goodbye". The greatest hits compilation album contained songs by artists who were signed to the Beatles' Apple record label between 1968 and 1973, and was the first multi-artist Apple compilation.

On 24 December 1969, the President of Equatorial Guinea, Francisco Macías Nguema, had 150 alleged coup plotters executed in the national stadium while the amplifier system played the Mary Hopkin recording of "Those Were the Days". It was supposedly one of the dictator's favorite songs.

The tune of "Those Were the Days" was used for the Republic of Ireland football chant "Come On, You Boys in Green".

In 2011, Hopkin's version of the song was used by Nando's South Africa in a satirical advertisement featuring Robert Mugabe as the "Last Dictator Standing". The commercial was quickly withdrawn as a result of the controversy it created and condemnation from pro-Mugabe loyalists.

== Charts (Mary Hopkin version) ==
=== Weekly charts ===
Chart (1968–1969)	Peak position
Australia (Kent Music Report)	2
Austria (Ö3 Austria Top 40)	2
Belgium (Ultratop 50 Flanders)	1
Canada Top Singles (RPM)	1
Denmark	1
Finland	1
France (CIDD)	1
Germany	1
Ireland (IRMA)	1
Japan (Oricon Singles Chart)	1
Netherlands (Dutch Top 40)	2
Netherlands (Single Top 100)	1
New Zealand	1
Norway (VG-lista)	1
Poland	1
Singapore	1
South Africa (Springbok Radio)	2
Spain (AFE)	1
Sweden	1
Switzerland (Schweizer Hitparade)	1
UK Singles (Official Charts)	1
US Billboard Easy Listening	1
US Billboard Hot 100	2
US Cash Box	1
US Record World	1
West Germany (GfK)	1

Chart (2009)	Peak position
Belgium (Back Catalogue Singles Flanders)	25

=== Year-end charts ===
Chart (1968)	Rank
Australia (AMR)	6
Belgium (Ultratop 50 Flanders)	8
Canada Top Singles (RPM)	16
Netherlands (Dutch Top 40)	5
Switzerland (Schweizer Hitparade)	9
UK Singles	2
US Billboard Hot 100	30
US Cash Box	22

== Certifications ==
Region	Certification	Certified units/sales
United States (RIAA)	Gold	1,000,000^{^}
^{^} Shipments figures based on certification alone.

== Notable recordings ==
- 1968: The French version of the song, "Le temps des fleurs", was popularized by the international recording star Dalida following Hopkin's success. Dalida's single debuted at number 1 on the French charts. She released an Italian version in November 1968.
- 2005: Dolly Parton released a version of the song on her album by the same name, “Those Were the Days (Dolly Parton album)”
- 2024: Australian singer Jude York released a re-written and rearranged version of the song.

== See also ==
- Apple Records discography
- List of Cash Box Top 100 number-one singles of 1968
- List of number-one adult contemporary singles of 1968 (U.S.)
- List of number-one singles of 1968 (Canada)
- List of number-one hits of 1968 (Germany)
- List of number-one singles of 1968 (Ireland)
- List of number-one singles of 1968 (Spain)
- List of number-one singles from 1968 to 1979 (Switzerland)
- List of Oricon number-one singles of 1969
- List of UK charts and number-one singles (1952–1969)
- VG-lista 1964 to 1994
