= Eugene Raskin =

American musician and playwright (1909–2004)

Eugene Raskin (September 5, 1909 – June 7, 2004) was an American musician and playwright, and adjunct professor at Columbia University (1936–1976). Best known as the lyricist of the song "Those Were the Days", he also wrote three books on architecture.

== Early life ==
Raskin was born in The Bronx in 1909. He studied at Columbia University and was adjunct professor of architecture at his alma mater between 1936 and 1976.

He wrote two stage plays: in 1949 One's a Crowd, a comedy about an atomic scientist who develops four personalities after his experiments go horribly wrong, and, in 1951, a romantic play titled Amata. He also wrote The Old Friend and a number of short pieces, including I'm on the Other Phone, Quartet for Two, and First Guitar (an autobiographical play about him acquiring his first guitar), all of which were presented by the dramatist Steven Packard, in his 1994–1995 thematically themed series Plays by Playwrights, at the theatre collective Polaris North in New York City.

In 1954, Raskin published Architecturally Speaking. Sequel to Cities was published in 1971 and Architecture and People in 1974. He also wrote a novel, Stranger in my Arms. In the early 1960s, Raskin and his wife Francesca played folk music around Greenwich Village in New York. They released an album that included "Those Were The Days", which was initially taken up by the Limeliters.

== Career success ==
Raskin created "Those Were the Days" by setting new, English-language lyrics to a tune by the Russian composer Boris Fomin, which Raskin had grown up hearing. He copyrighted both the lyrics and the tune, despite having created only the former.

Raskin and his wife Francesca were international balladeers for years and recorded several albums for Elektra Records. They played London's Blue Angel every year and always closed their show with "Those Were the Days". Paul McCartney frequented the club when they were performing and, when the Beatles formed the Apple label, he secured the rights to "Those Were the Days" for a record by singer Mary Hopkin. The song was subsequently released in many versions by various artists, in over twenty languages.

At the peak of the song's success, a New York company made a commercial using Raskin's version of the melody with new lyrics, "Rokeach Ga-filte-fish, Rokeach Ga-filte-fish". saying that the tune was an old Russian folk tune and was in public domain. Raskin sued and won his case and a settlement, on the grounds that his version of the melody, which he had slightly altered from its public-domain form to fit his lyrics, was sufficiently altered to be eligible for copyright.

At one time, Raskin opened mail containing a check for $26,000, which were the royalties just for the US mechanicals for that month. Raskin bought a home in Pollença, Mallorca; a Porsche Spyder; and a sailboat, and lived very well off royalties for the rest of his life.

He also got royalties from his novel Stranger in My Arms, his play The Old Friend, and his several books on architecture, which are still used in various universities around the world. In addition, Raskin, along with composer Lou Singer, wrote the theme song for the English-language version of the mid-1960s animated series Gigantor.

Raskin died on June 7, 2004, in Manhattan, New York.

== Publications ==
- Sequel to Cities: What Happens When Cities Are Extinct, Bloch Publishing (1969)
