= Ivan Kozlov =

Russian poet (1779–1840)

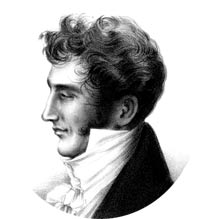
Ivan Kozlov

Ivan Ivanovich Kozlov (Russian: Иван Иванович Козлов; 22 April [O.S. 11 April] 1779 – 11 February [O.S. 30 January] 1840) was a Russian Romantic poet and translator. As D. S. Mirsky noted, "his poetry appealed to the easily awakened emotions of the sentimental reader rather than to the higher poetic receptivity".

== Biography ==
Kozlov was born in Moscow, of noble ancestry, in 1779. He began writing poetry only after 1820, when he became blind. He reached the success equal to that of Alexander Pushkin with The Monk (1825), a verse tale in which the darkness of a Byronic hero is sentimentalized and redeemed by ultimate repentance. The Monk produced as large a family of imitations as either of Pushkin's Romantic poems. Kozlov's two other narrative poems, Princess Natalie Dolgorukov (1828), a sentimental variation on the theme of the misfortunes of Peter II's bride, and The Mad Girl (1830), met with a somewhat diminished success. Today the only poem of his still universally remembered is an exceptionally faithful translation of Thomas Moore's Evening Bells, entitled Вечерний звон, a popular Russian song. He also translated The Burial of Sir John Moore after Corunna by Charles Wolfe (Не бил барабан перед смутным полком), and this text also became very popular in Russia.

Ivan Kozlov died in Saint Petersburg in 1840, aged 60.
