= Evening Bell (song) =

Russian song

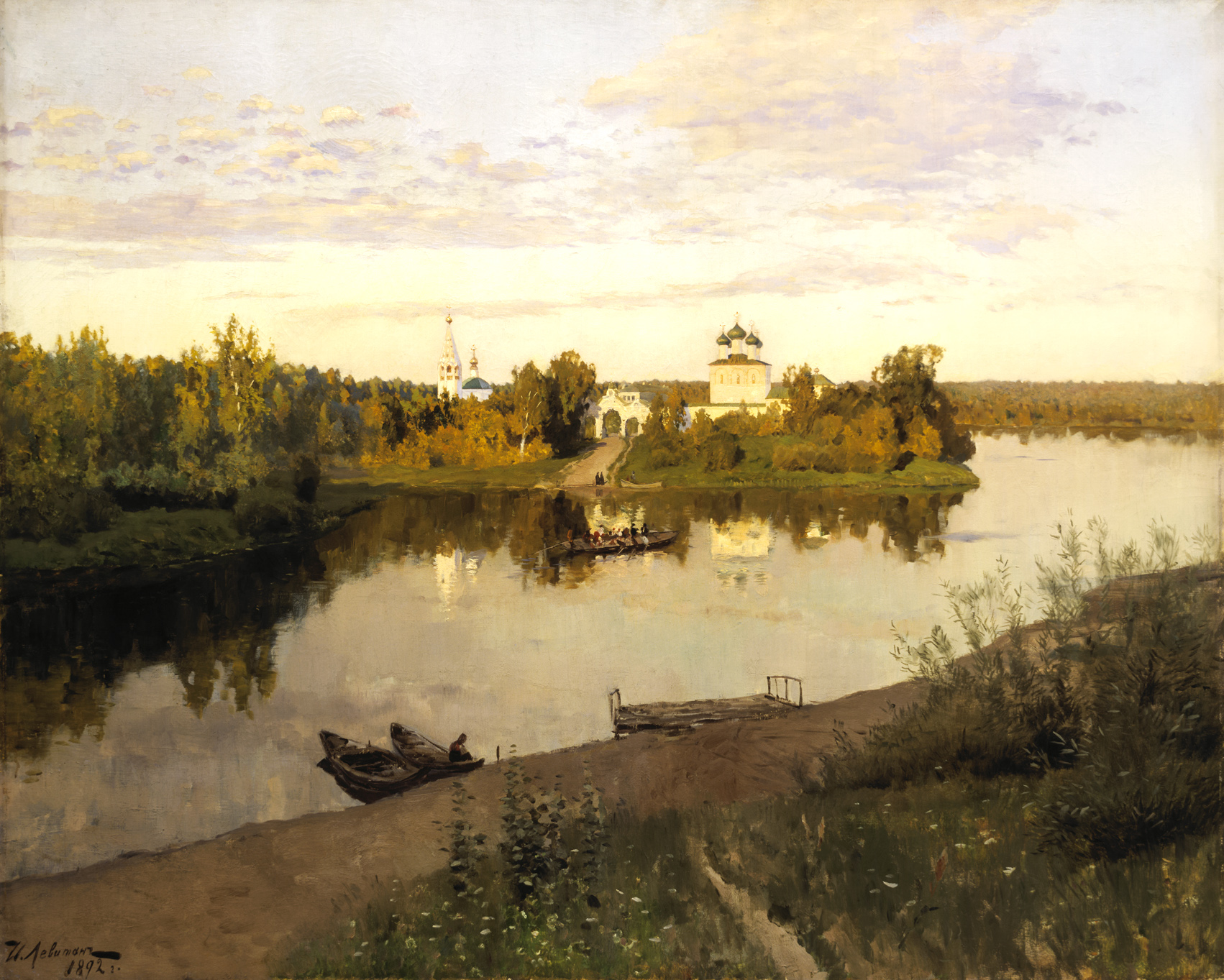
Isaak Levitan. Evening Bells (1892).

Evening Bell (Вечерний звон) is a popular Russian song written in 1828 by Ivan Kozlov and Alexander Alyabyev. The lyrics are adapted from a Russian-themed verse by Thomas Moore.

== Lyrics ==
=== English original ===
In 1818 Thomas Moore published his first collection of National Airs, a collection of songs which included his verses and musical scores by John Andrew Stevenson. The title of one verse from the Russian airs was Those Evening Bells with the subtitle Air: The bells of St.Petersburg. It starts with:

Those evening bells! Those evening bells!
How many a tale their music tells,
Of youth, and home, and those sweet time,
When last I heard their soothing chime.
..

Moore mentioned that the verse was based on a Russian original, but all attempts to find the original failed. One hypothesis put forward in 1885 traced the source of the song to George the Hagiorite, an Orthodox monk and writer of the 11th century from the Iviron monastery on Mount Athos). Soviet researchers tried to prove the link, but found no traces of such a song. The most likely conclusion is that the verse is Thomas Moore's original creation loosely based on Russian-related themes.

The verse was quite well known in the English-speaking world, e.g., it was satirised by Thomas Hood (Those Evening Bells, those Evening Bells, How many a tale their music tells, Of Yorkshire cakes and crumpets prime, And letters only just in time!. It was listed in the dictionary of familiar quotations from 1919.

=== Kozlov's translation ===
Kozlov was a Russian poet in his own right, but also a prolific translator of contemporary English poetry (translating Byron, Charles Wolfe and Thomas Moore). His Russian text published in 1828 is more like an adaptation of the English original, as Kozlov used six-line stanzas instead of quatrains of the original, while being still faithful to the general mood and the rhythmic structure of the source (iambic tetrameter). His adaptation is credited with greater elaboration of the context, grounding the abstractness of the original with specific examples.

Thomas Moore
Ivan Kozlov
Literal back translation
Those evening Bells
(Air: The bells of St.Petersburg)
Вечерний звон
Evening bell

Those evening bells! Those evening bells!
How many a tale their music tells,
Of youth, and home, and those sweet time,
When last I heard their soothing chime.
...

Вечерний звон, вечерний звон!
Как много дум наводит он
О юных днях в краю родном,
Где я любил, где отчий дом,
И как я, с ним навек простясь,
Там слушал звон в последний раз!
...

Evening bell, evening bell!
How many a thought it inspires.
Of youth days in my native land,
Where I loved, where my father's house is.
And also of the moment when leaving it forever,
I was hearing the bell there for the last time!
...

When Kozlov published this verse, the original text was not mentioned. Combined with the fact that Moore's text claimed to be based on a Russian original, this brought some erroneous attributions (as early as in 1831) that Moore's verse is a translation of Kozlov's.

== Song ==
Soon after publication of the Russian translation, it was made into a song by Alexander Alyabyev, also in 1828. This music became immensely popular and resulted in variations on the same theme, as well as in completely different songs based on the same translation.

The English original itself was published with music composed by John Andrew Stevenson. It also resulted in several other songs:

- Harry Hill, (SSA, a cappella)
- Charles Edward Ives (in 1907)
- Harvey Worthington Loomis (in 1918, SSA, a cappella)
- Henri Ketten (1848–1883)

== Other translations ==
There are two translations of the song into German (by Caroline Leonhardt Pierson and Henry Hugo Pierson, O Abendglocken, Abendhall, 1845), as well as into Polish (by Stanisław Moniuszko).

Sergei Taneyev and Antoni Grabowski translated Moore's original verse into Esperanto under the title Sonoriloj de vesper (Evening bells).

== Cover versions ==
Cover versions include:

- "Nasdrovje womm" by Otto Waalkes

Otto teaches the song to the audience. It only contains the words "nastrovje" (A Russian word often incorrectly said to be "cheers") and "womm" (a meaningless word sounding similar to the original "zvon") so the audience can easily respond it.

- "Wij zijn niet bang" (Dutch) and "Schlumpfies Boogie Woogie Show" by Vader Abraham (German)

It can be found on the LP record "Vader Abraham in the Land of the Smurfs", issued at least in German and Dutch Language.
