= Alexander Vertinsky =

Russian and Soviet artist and singer (1889–1957)

Alexander Vertinsky Александр Вертинский
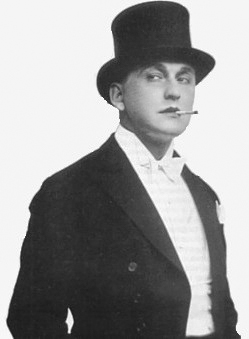
- Vertinsky before 1918

Background information
- Also known as: Aleksander Wertyński
- Born: Alexander Nikolayevich Vertinsky; 20 March [O.S. 8 March] 1889; Kiev, Kiev Governorate, Russian Empire (now Kyiv, Ukraine)
- Died: May 21, 1957 (aged 68) Leningrad, Soviet Union (now Saint Petersburg, Russia)
- Genres: Russian romance, cabaret, tango
- Occupations: singer, poet, actor, composer
- Years active: 1916–1957

Alexander Nikolayevich Vertinsky (Russian: Александр Николаевич Вертинский; 20 March [O.S. 8 March] 1889 – May 21, 1957) was a Russian and Soviet artist, poet, singer, composer, cabaret artist and actor who exerted seminal influence on the Russian tradition of artistic singing.

== Early years ==
Alexander Vertinsky and his elder sister Nadezhda were born in Kiev (now Kyiv, Ukraine) out of wedlock: their parents couldn't marry since his father's first wife ("Varvara, an elderly, evil and unattractive woman") refused a divorce, so he had to adopt his own children. Both parents belonged to the Russian Orthodox Church. His father Nikolai Petrovich Vertinsky (1845—1894) came from a railwayman's family. He was a well-known lawyer – according to Alexander, especially popular among poor people, because he defended them for free and even helped financially, — and an occasional journalist (he published feuilletons under a pen name Graf Niver).

While Alexander considered himself Russian in general, he assumed he had some Polish blood too: "I never met people with my surname in Russia, but in Poland it is met more or less often... one of my great-grandfathers was probably a Pole". He also recognised that he had some Ukrainian ancestry and Ukrainian as one of his native languages. In his letters Vertinsky recalled a time when he was working at Dovzhenko Film Studios and Ukrainian actress Natalia Uzhviy was surprised to hear his Ukrainian accent.

Alexander's mother Eugenia Stepanovna Skolatskaya came from a noble family, but the parents rejected her after she had given birth to illegitimate children. She died when Alexander was only three years old from sepsis after an unsuccessful surgery, and in two years his father also died from tuberculosis. As Alexander described it, Nikolai Vertinsky couldn't accept his wife's death, spent a lot of time at the cemetery, and at one point was found unconscious near her tomb, which led to his illness and quick death.

Vertinsky was brought up by his mother's sister Maria Stepanovna, while Nadezhda was raised by her other sister, Lidia Stepanovna. They didn't want siblings to meet, to the point that Alexander was told that his sister had died, and vice versa; only years later did he see her name in a theatrical magazine and contact her. In 1898, he entered the First Kiev Gymnasium meant for children of the aristocracy. He was expelled from the second grade and moved to the less prestigious 4th Kiev Gymnasium. In 1905, he was expelled once again, this time from the fifth grade. Vertinsky didn't enjoy studying, blaming his aunt who "knew nothing about raising children".

He tried various jobs before earning his living by contributing short stories to the Kievan periodicals. In 1912 Vertinsky and his sister moved to Moscow, where he failed in his ambition to join Konstantin Stanislavski's Moscow Art Theatre. During that time, he became addicted to cocaine, a habit that would claim the life of his sister. From 1914 to 1916 he took part in World War I by serving aboard a hospital train organized by the Morozovs. He treated only heavily wounded soldiers and dressed a total of 35000 wounds.

By 1916, Vertinsky started to employ a scenic figure of Pierrot, with powdered face, singing miniature novellas-in-song known as ariettas, or "Pierrot's doleful ditties". Each song contained a prologue, exposition, culmination, and a tragic finale. The novice performer was christened the "Russian Pierrot", gained renown, became an object of imitation, admiration, vilified in the press and lionized by the audiences.

Simultaneously with his booming singing career, he played screen bit parts in Aleksandr Khanzhonkov's silent movies. From that time stems a lifelong friendship with Ivan Mozzhukhin. His famous piece "Vashi paltsy pakhnut ladanom" ("Your Fingers Smell of Frankincense") was dedicated to another film star, Vera Kholodnaya. Shortly before the October Revolution Vertinsky devised a stage persona of Black Pierrot and started to tour Russia and Ukraine performing decadent elegies with a touch of cosmopolitan chic, such as "Kokainetka" and Tango "Magnolia" ("V bananovo-limonnom Singapure"). In the words of the American historian Richard Stites, "Vertinsky bathed his verses in images of palm trees, tropical birds, foreign ports, plush lobbies, ceiling fans, and "daybreak on the pink-tinted sea" — precisely those things which the war-time audience craved for.

== Career abroad ==
By November 1920, Vertinsky decided to leave Russia with the bulk of his clientele. He performed in Constantinople and toured Romanian Bessarabia, where he was declared a Soviet agent. In 1923, he performed in Poland and Germany, then moved to Paris, where he would perform before the Russian émigré clientele at Montmartre cabarets for nine years.

In 1926, Vertinsky made one of the earliest recordings of the song "Dorogoi dlinnoyu" ("Дорогой длинною" or "Endless Road"), written by Boris Fomin (1900–1948) with words by the poet Konstantin Podrevskii, which, with English lyrics by Gene Raskin, was a major hit for Mary Hopkin in 1968 as "Those Were the Days".

After several successful tours in the Middle East, Vertinsky followed the majority of well-to-do Russians to the United States, where he debuted before the audience which included Rachmaninoff, Chaliapin, and Marlene Dietrich. The Great Depression forced him to join the community of Shanghai Russians. It was in China that he met his wife and the oldest daughter, Marianna, was born.

== Final years ==
In 1943, the Soviet government allowed Vertinsky to return to Russia. Despite lack of media coverage, he performed about two thousand concerts in the USSR, touring from Sakhalin to Kaliningrad. To feed his family, he also appeared in Soviet films, often playing pre-revolutionary aristocrats, as in the screen version of Chekhov's "Anna on the Neck" (1955). His role of an anti-Communist cardinal in "The Doomed Conspiracy" even won him the Stalin Prize for 1951.

The artist died on 21 May 1957 of heart failure at the Hotel Astoria in Leningrad after giving his last performance. He was buried at the Novodevichy Cemetery in Moscow.

== Family ==
Between 1923 and 1941 Vertinsky was married to Irina Vladimirovna Vertidis. While he doesn't mention her in his memoirs, her name could be found in the divorce certificate. From 1942 and till his death Vertinsky was married to the actress and artist Lidiya Vertinskaya (née Tsirgvava, 1923—2013). They had two daughters: Marianna Vertinskaya (born 1943) and Anastasiya Vertinskaya (born 1944), both successful actresses.

Marianna was married three times; she has a daughter Alexandra from her first marriage to the Soviet architect Ilya Bylinkin and a daughter Daria from her second marriage to the actor Boris Khmelnitsky. Anastasiya was married to the film director Nikita Mikhalkov from 1966 to 1969 and gave birth to their son Stepan Mikhalkov, also an actor and restaurateur. According to the singer-composer Alexander Gradsky, he was married to Vertinskaya from 1976 to 1978, yet she denied they were ever officially married. She also had a long-lasting relationship (around 20 years) with the theatre director Oleg Yefremov.

== In popular culture ==
Vertinsky is still influential in Russian musical culture, and has been covered by the likes of Vladimir Vysotsky and Boris Grebenshchikov. There is even an album of electronic lounge covers, by the Cosmos Sound Club.

In 2021, an eight-episode television series about the singer, titled simply Vertinsky, was premiered, first online and then on the Russian First Channel. Vertinsky was played by Aleksey Filimonov, who himself performed all the featured songs.

== Legacy ==
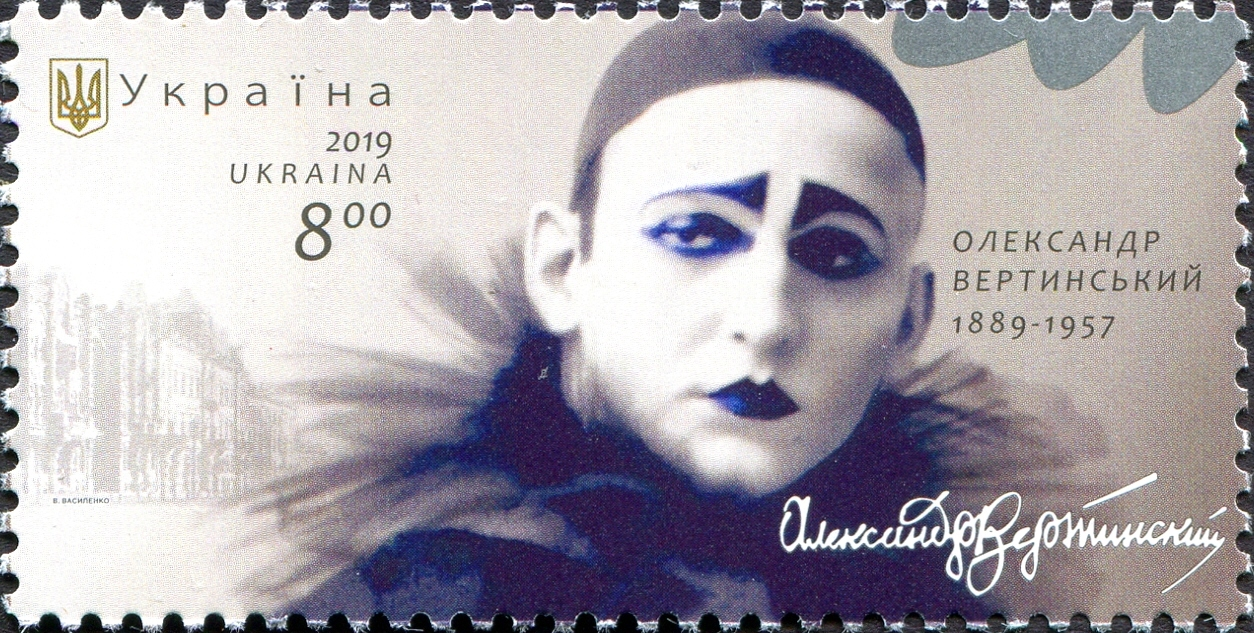
Vertinsky on a 2019 Ukrainian stamp

A minor planet 3669 Vertinskij, discovered by Soviet astronomer Lyudmila Georgievna Karachkina in 1982 is named after him.

== Selected discography (LPs and CDs) ==
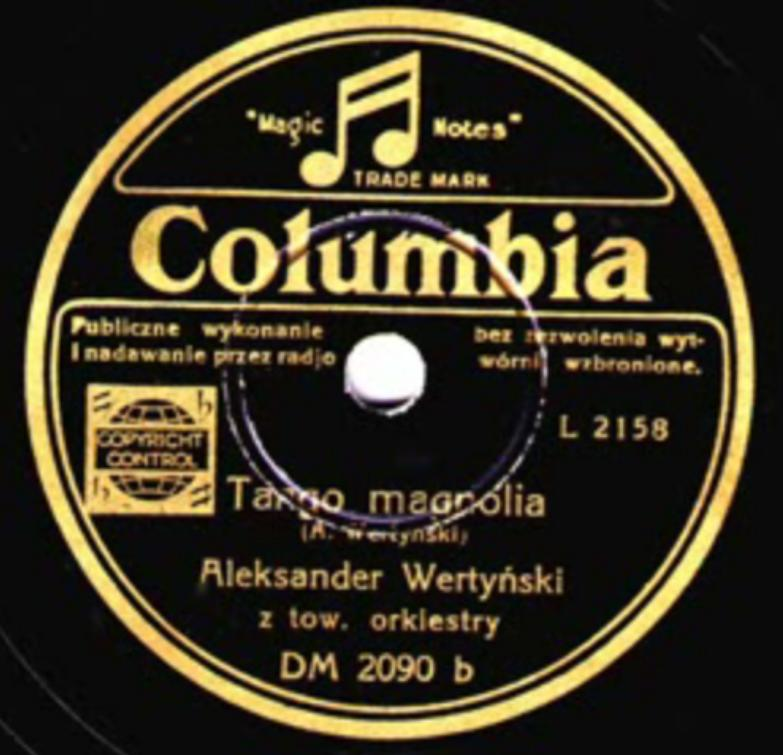
Vertinsky's record

- 1969: Александр Вертинский (Мелодия, Д 026773-4, Soviet Union)
- 1989: Александр Вертинский (Мелодия, М60 48689 001; М60 48691 001, Soviet Union)
- 1994: То, что я должен сказать (Мелодия, MEL CD 60 00621 | Russia)
- 1995: Songs of Love, Песни любви (RDM, CDRDM 506089; Boheme Music, CDBMR 908089, Russia)
- 1996: Vertinski (Le Chant du monde, LDX 274939-40, France)
- 1999: Легенда века (Boheme Music, CDBMR 908090, Russia)
- 2000: Vertinski (Boheme Music, CDBMR 007143, Russia)
- 2003: Selected Songs (Russia), Disk 1, Disk 2, Disk 3, Disk 4

== Selected filmography ==
- Secrets of the Orient (1928)

== See also ==
- Vera Kholodnaya
- Aleksandr Khanzhonkov
- Ivan Mozzhukhin
