= Igor Outkine =

Soviet-British accordionist (born 1964)

- Игорь Уткин
- Born: 1964; Soviet Union
- Occupation(s): Accordionist, singer

Igor Outkine (Note: Russian: Игорь Уткин, romanized: Igor Utkin) (born 1964) is an acoustic and midi accordionist and vocalist. His vocal and instrumental repertoire covers a wide range of music such as classical and opera, Neapolitan song, Argentine and Russian tango, jazz and pop.

Outkine was born in the Soviet Union and studied classical accordion at Elektrostal's music college and traditional singing at the Gnesin Institute in Moscow. He performed with several folk groups and with the Rozovsky Theatre of Moscow. He came to London in 1990 with the gypsy band Loyko and has continued to perform the music of his homeland in various venues.

In 2004 he appeared in Almeida Theatre in London with Soft Cell lead singer Marc Almond playing and singing Russian songs and is featured on Almond's live DVD Sin Songs.

He has played on several major film soundtracks including The Man Who Knew Too Little, Birthday Girl, MirrorMask, La Vie en Rose and La Môme.

Igor also appears on screen in the David Cronenberg film Eastern Promises, singing the Russian folk song "Dark Eyes". He appeared on ITV's Britain's Got Talent in 2019 performing a pop medley.

In 2024 he appeared in TV mini series A Gentleman in Moscow playing accordion and singing a medley of Russian folk songs.

In 1996, Igor Outkine formed a music duo with English violinist Sarah Harrison called Mazaika. Their repertoire consists of Russian folk music and Gypsy music, Russian and Argentinian tango, classical virtuoso showpieces, opera highlights, Neapolitan songs and French chanson, Hotclub jazz and Outkine's original compositions.
