= Vadim Kozin =

Soviet singer and songwriter

Vadim Alekseyevich Kozin Вадим Алексеевич Козин
- Born: March 21, 1903; Saint Petersburg, Russian Empire (present-day Russia)
- Died: December 19, 1994 (aged 91) Magadan, Russia
- Occupations: Singer, songwriter
- Years active: 1929-1994

Vadim Alekseyevich Kozin (Note: Russian: Вадим Алексеевич Козин, romanized: Vadim Alekseyevich Kozin) (March 21, 1903 – December 19, 1994) was a Russian tenor, songwriter.

Vadim Alekseyevich Kozin was born the son of a merchant in Saint Petersburg to Alexei Gavrilovich Kozin and Vera Ilinskaya in 1903. His mother was of Romani heritage and often sang in the local gypsy choir. Their house was frequently full of musicians, exposing Vadim to tradition from an early age.

He began to sing professionally in the 1920s, and gained success almost immediately. In the 1930s he moved to Moscow and began playing with the accompanist David Ashkenazi.

Kozin was an openly homosexual man until 1934 when male homosexuality became a crime in USSR.

During World War II he served in the entertainment brigade and sang for Soviet troops.

In 1944, shortly before the birthday of Stalin, the police chief Lavrenty Beria called him up and asked why his songs didn't involve Stalin. Kozin famously replied that songs about Stalin were not suited for tenor voices. In late 1944, Kozin was sentenced to five years in jail as part of the repression campaign against prominent Soviet performers and was sent to the Magadan labour camps because of his homosexuality.

He was initially released in 1950 and was able to return to his singing career. Though released once again several years later, he was never officially exonerated and remained in exile in 'the spa Magadan' -as he called it- until his death. Speaking to journalists in 1982, he explained how he had been forced to tour the Kolyma camps: "The Politburo formed brigades which would, under surveillance, go on tours of the concentration camps and perform for the prisoners and the guards, including those of the highest rank."

His prison sentence deeply traumatized Kozin, leading to the cessation of his singing career. He even began burning his own records, to the point where his friends were forced to hide their own copies from him in order to preserve them. The Soviet government never officially rehabilitated him and his 90th birthday was celebrated in private among friends in Magadan.

In 1993, while being interviewed by Theo Uittenbogaard for the TV documentary Gold – Lost in Siberia , he recalled how he was released from exile temporarily and flown into Yalta for a few hours, because Winston Churchill, a big fan of his, unaware of Kozin's forced exile, had asked Stalin for the famous singer Vadim Kozin to perform, during a break in the Yalta Conference, held February 4–11, 1945.

Also in 1993, Anna Sadovnikova and Christian Gramstadt made a report (SAT.1) and a film ("Gold, Gulag, Gewalt", ORB) about the Magadan-Susuman area, which included an interview with Vadim Kozin and recorded his famous Magadan song in his Magadan flat.

He died at the age of 91 in 1994.

Marc Almond included songs from Kozin's repertoire on his 2003 album Heart on Snow and went on to record the album Orpheus in Exile on which he covers Kozin's songs exclusively. The latter was released on September 7, 2009, to wide critical acclaim.
