= Izabella Yurieva =

Russian singer

- Изабелла Юрьева
- Yurieva in 1922
- Born: Izabella Danilovna Livikova; 7 September 1899; Rostov-on-Don
- Died: 20 January 2000 (aged 100); Moscow
- Resting place: Donskoye Cemetery, Moscow
- Years active: 1922–2000
- Awards: People's Artist of Russia (1992); Order For Merit to the Fatherland 4th class (1999)

Izabella Yurieva (Russian: Изабелла Юрьева) is the stage name of Izabella Danilovna Livikova (Russian: Изабелла Даниловна Ливикова; 7 September 1899 – 20 January 2000), a Russian singer nicknamed the "Queen of the Russian Romance" who celebrated her centennial at a tribute concert given in her honor at the Central Concert Hall in Moscow in 1999.

She was one of the top performers of the romantic Russian Gypsy songs in the late 1920s and 1930s before the genre became almost taboo in Soviet Russia.

Yurieva was largely forgotten until the 1990s when she resurfaced on television and was named a People's Artist of Russia.

== See also ==
- 7452 Izabelyuria, asteroid named after her
