= Russian romance =

Type of sentimental sung poetry developed in Imperial Russia

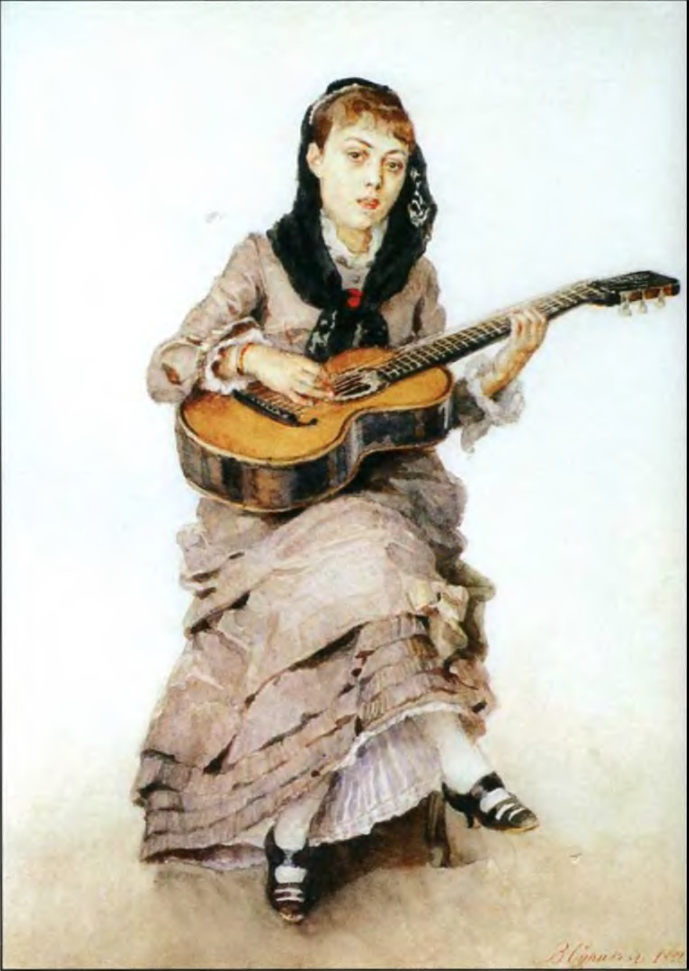
Vasily Surikov, "With a Guitar". Portrait of Princess S. A. Kropotkina, 1882

Russian romance (Russian: рома́нс románs) is a type of sentimental art songs that was developed in the Russian Empire in 19th century.

== History ==
By the early 20th century, several types of the Russian romance had emerged. An elite type of the Italianate opera-influenced song known as the "salon romance" is contrasted to the lower-class genre of "cruel romance" which features "sentimental courtship, illicit love, pained rejection, and often suicide". The latter is supposed to have given birth to the Russian chanson.

The Russian romance had its heyday in the 1910s and 1920s when the top performers included Anastasia Vyaltseva, Varvara Panina, Nadezhda Plevitskaya, Tamara Tsereteli, Pyotr Leshchenko, and Alexander Vertinsky. Notable composers in the style include Nikolai Titov (1800-1875), Alexander Alyabyev (1787–1851), Alexander Varlamov (1801–48), and Alexander Gurilyov (1803–58). In the early Soviet era the genre was less favoured, as it was seen as a vestige of the pre-revolutionary "decadent and bourgeois" sensibility through much of the 20th century.

A new generation of singers, such as Valentina Ponomaryova and Nani Bregvadze, emerged in the 1970s. Several vocalists from the pre-WWII era, including Izabella Yurieva (1899–2000), Vadim Kozin (1903–1994) and Alla Bayanova (1914–2011), also returned to prominence in the late Soviet years. Alexander Malinin, Sergey Zakharov and Oleg Pogudin are among the Russian romance singers active in the 21st century. In 1994, . Alexander Malinin received the World Music Award as best selling Russian artist.

César Cui's 1895 book Russian Art Song: A Study of Its Development was translated in J.R. Walker’s Classical Essays on the Development of Russian Art Songs (Northfield, MN, 1993).

== Notable songs ==
- Black Eyes
- Shine, Shine, My Star
- Дорогой длинною/Those Were the Days/Along the Long Road
- Evening Bell
- Les Chrysanthemes

== See also ==
- Starogradska muzika
