= Alexander Alyabyev =

Russian composer

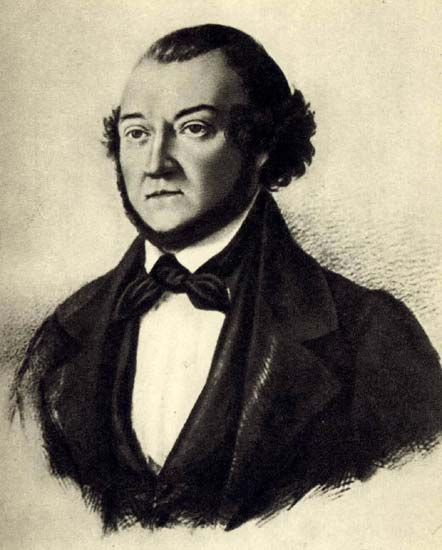
Alexander Alyabyev (date unknown)

Alexander Aleksandrovich Alyabyev (Russian: Алекса́ндр Алекса́ндрович Аля́бьев; 15 August [O.S. 4 August] 1787 – 6 March [O.S. 22 February] 1851), also rendered as Alabiev or Alabieff, was a Russian composer known as one of the fathers of the Russian art song. He wrote seven operas, twenty musical comedies, a symphony, three string quartets, more than 200 songs, and many other pieces.

== Biography ==
Born to a wealthy family of Governor Alexander Vasilievich Alyabyev in Tobolsk in Siberia, Alyabyev learned music in his early years. He joined the Russian Army in 1812, during the Napoleonic War, and fought as an officer until 1823. He participated in the entry of the Russian forces into Dresden and Paris, and he won two awards.

In February 1825 Alyabyev and three others took part in an all-night card game which ended with retired colonel T.M. Vremev being accused of cheating and struck first by Alyabyev and then also by the two other players. The colonel died a few days later, possibly from a ruptured spleen, and Alyabyev was arrested on a charge of murder. While the evidence was not conclusive, Tsar Nicholas I expressly ordered him into exile to his native town of Tobolsk. Freed in 1831, he spent some years in the Caucasus before returning to Moscow, where he died in 1851.

== The Nightingale and other songs ==
Alyabyev's most famous work is The Nightingale (Соловей), a song based on a poem by Anton Delvig. It was composed while Alyabyev was in prison, in 1825. It has entered Russian consciousness as akin to a folk song.

The song became more widely known after having been introduced into Rosina's singing lesson scene in Gioachino Rossini's The Barber of Seville by Pauline Viardot, followed by Adelina Patti and Marcella Sembrich.

Mikhail Glinka wrote piano variations based on the song, as did Mily Balakirev. Franz Liszt also wrote a transcription of it (S. 250/1).

It was one of Pyotr Ilyich Tchaikovsky's favourite songs from his earliest childhood, as his mother often sang it to him.

Other songs by Alyabyev include "Ja vizhu obraz" (I See Your Image), "Ja vas ljubil" (I Loved You), "Uvy, zachem ona blistajet" (Alas, Why is She so Radiant) and "Nishchaja" (The Poor Woman/La Pauvre Femme by Pierre-Jean de Béranger).

== Compositions ==
Cherubic Hymn by Alexander Alyabyev

- The Village Philosopher (vaudeville, with Alexey Verstovsky and Maurer, 1823)
- The Nightingale (1827)
- The Mermaid and the Fisherman (opera, 1842)
- Ammalat-Bek (opera, 1843–47)
- A Prisoner in the Caucasus (opera, 1845)
- Morning and Evening (vaudeville)
- Moonlit Night, or The House Spirits (opera)
- Celebration of Muses (which opened the Bolshoi Theatre (1825)
- The Magic Drum, or the Sequel to The Magic Flute (ballet)
- incidental music to Shakespeare's The Merry Wives of Windsor
- incidental music to Shakespeare's A Midsummer Night's Dream
- three string quartets
- Three Tens, or The New Two Day Adventure
- Piano Trio in E♭ major (1815), unfinished
- Piano Trio in A minor (1834), in three movements (I. Allegro ma non troppo, II. Adagio, III. Rondo: allegretto)
- Cherubic Hymn in F minor
