= Mary Hopkin discography =

- Studio albums: 10
- EPs: 4
- Live albums: 1
- Compilation albums: 7
- Singles: 25
- Other albums: 2

This is the discography of Welsh folk singer-songwriter Mary Hopkin.

== Albums ==
=== Studio albums ===
Title	Album details	Peak chart positions		
Title	Album details	UK	CAN	US
Post Card	Released: 21 February 1969; Label: Apple; Formats: LP, MC, 4-track, 8-track	3	24	28
Earth Song/Ocean Song	Released: 1 October 1971; Label: Apple; Formats: LP, MC, 8-track	—	—	204
Spirit	Released: 12 December 1989; Label: Trax Music; Formats: CD, LP	—	—	—
Valentine	Released: 3 May 2007; Label: Mary Hopkin Music; Formats: CD; Archival recordings from 1972 to 1980	—	—	—
Recollections	Released: 1 December 2008; Label: Mary Hopkin Music; Formats: CD; Archival recordings from 1970 to 1986	—	—	—
Now and Then	Released: 25 May 2009; Label: Mary Hopkin Music; Formats: CD, digital download; Archival recordings from 1970 to 1988	—	—	—
You Look Familiar	Released: 25 October 2010; Label: Mary Hopkin Music; Formats: CD, digital download; With Morgan Visconti	—	—	—
Painting by Numbers	Released: 27 January 2014; Label: Mary Hopkin Music; Formats: CD, digital download	—	—	—
Another Road	Released: 31 August 2020; Label: Mary Hopkin Music; Formats: CD, digital download	—	—	—
A Christmas Chorale	Released: 1 December 2020; Label: Mary Hopkin Music; Formats: CD, digital download	—	—	—
Pieces	Released: 1 February 2022; Label: Mary Hopkin Music; Formats: CD, digital download	—	—	—
Two Hearts (with Jessica Lee Morgan)	Released: 3 May 2023; Label: Mary Hopkin Music; Formats: CD, digital download	—	—	—
Doodling	Released: 3 January 2025; Label: Mary Hopkin Music; Formats: CD, digital download	—	—	—
"—" denotes releases that did not chart or were not released in that territory.

=== Live albums ===
Title	Album details
Live at the Royal Festival Hall 1972	Released: September 2005; Label: Mary Hopkin Music; Formats: CD

=== Compilation albums ===
Title	Album details
Pleserau Serch (Plaisir d'amour)	Released: 1971; Label: Odeon; Formats: LP; Japan-only release
The Best of Mary Hopkin	Released: 31 March 1972; Label: Apple; Formats: LP, MC; Germany and Netherlands-only release
Those Were the Days	Released: 25 September 1972; Label: Apple; Formats: LP, MC, 8-track
The Welsh World of Mary Hopkin	Released: 24 May 1979; Label: Decca; Formats: LP
Y Caneuon Cynnar – The Early Years	Released: December 1996; Label: Sain; Formats: CD, MC
The Mary Hopkin Collection	Released: 2 May 2005; Label: Apple; Formats: 3xCD; Japan-only limited box set release
A Portrait of Mary	Released: 29 August 2008; Label: ZYX Music/ABC Entertainment; Formats: CD; Germany-only release

=== Other albums ===
Title	Album details	Peak chart positions
Title	Album details	UK
Oasis	Released: 20 April 1984; Label: WEA; Formats: CD, LP, MC; As part of the short-lived group Oasis	23
Sundance	Released: 17 May 2002; Label: EMI, Angel Air; Formats: CD; Recorded in the early 1980s as part of Sundance (along with Mike Hurst and Mike de Albuquerque)	—
"—" denotes releases that did not chart or were not released in that territory.

== EPs ==
Title	Album details
Llais Swynol Mary Hopkin	Released: 3 May 1968; Label: Cambrian; Formats: 7"
Mary ac Edward	Released: June 1968; Label: Cambrian; Formats: 7"; With Edward M. Jones
Christmas Songs	Released: 1 December 2008; Label: Mary Hopkin Music; Formats: CD, digital download
Those Were the Days	Released: 31 August 2018; Label: Mary Hopkin Music; Formats: CD

== Singles ==
Name	Year	Peak chart positions										Album
Name	Year	UK	AUS	CAN	JPN	IRE	NL	NZ	SA	US	US AC	Album
"Those Were the Days"	1968	1	2	1	1	1	1	3	2	2	1	Non-album single (Note: "Those Were the Days" was included on the North American release of Post Card.)
"Aderyn Llwyd"	1969	—	—	—	—	—	—	—	—	—	—	Non-album singles
"Lontano dagli occhi"	1969	—	—	—	—	—	—	—	—	—	—	Non-album singles
"Prince en Avignon" (France-only release)	1969	—	—	—	—	—	—	—	—	—	—	Post Card
"Goodbye"	1969	2	2	15	13	1	1	2	2	13	6	Non-album singles
"Temma Harbour"	1970	6	6	42	—	3	12	3	—	39	4	Non-album singles
"Knock, Knock Who's There?"	1970	2	5	—	38	2	3	1	—	92	11	Non-album singles
"Pleserau Serch (Plaisir d'amour)"	1970	—	—	—	—	—	—	—	—	—	—	Non-album singles
"Que Sera, Sera (Whatever Will Be, Will Be)"	1970	—	30	47	18	—	—	10	—	77	7	Non-album singles
"Think About Your Children"	1970	19	51	82	—	—	—	—	—	87	27	Non-album singles
"Let My Name Be Sorrow"	1971	46	—	—	—	—	—	—	—	—	—	Non-album singles
"Water, Paper & Clay"	1971	—	94	—	—	—	—	—	—	113	—	Earth Song/Ocean Song
"Summertime, Summertime" (as part of Hobby Horse)	1972	—	—	—	—	—	5	—	—	—	—	Non-album singles
"Mary Had a Baby"	1972	—	—	—	—	—	—	—	—	—	—	Non-album singles
"If You Love Me (I Won't Care)"	1976	32	—	—	—	—	—	—	—	—	—	Non-album singles
"Wrap Me in Your Arms"	1977	—	—	—	—	—	—	—	—	—	—	Non-album singles
"Beyond the Fields We Know" (as the Elfland Ensemble featuring Mary Hopkin)	1977	—	—	—	—	—	—	—	—	—	—	The King of Elfland's Daughter
"What's Love" (as part of Sundance)	1981	—	—	—	—	—	—	—	10	—	—	Non-album singles (Note: Included on the 2002 album Sundance.)
"Walk Right In" (as part of Sundance)	1982	—	—	—	—	—	—	—	—	—	—	Non-album singles
"Hold Me" (as part of Oasis)	1984	—	—	—	—	—	—	—	—	—	—	Oasis
"I Wonder Why" (as part of Oasis)	1984	—	—	—	—	—	—	—	—	—	—	Oasis
"Ave Maria"	1989	—	—	—	—	—	—	—	—	—	—	Spirit
"No More War" (as Freedom Found)	1990	—	—	—	—	—	—	—	—	—	—	Non-album singles
"Snowed Under"	2006	—	—	—	—	—	—	—	—	—	—	Non-album singles
"Iesu Faban"	2014	—	—	—	—	—	—	—	—	—	—	Non-album singles
"—" denotes releases that did not chart or were not released in that territory.

== Contributions ==
Year	Title	Artist	Contribution
1969	Where's Jack	Elmer Bernstein	Lead vocals on "Where's Jack" and "Last Moments"
1972	Kidnapped	Roy Budd	Lead vocals on "For All My Days"
1972	Peace Will Come	Tom Paxton	Backing vocals on "Peace Will Come", "Out Behind the Gypsy's" and "What a Friend You Are"
1972	Not Till Tomorrow	Ralph McTell	Backing vocals on "Zimmerman Blues"
1973	Moonshine	Bert Jansch	Lead vocals on "The First Time Ever I Saw Your Face"
1973	New Songs for Old Friends	Tom Paxton	Backing vocals on "Silent Night" and "When Princes Meet"
1973	Worlds Apart Together	The Sarstedt Brothers	Backing vocals on "Glory, Glory"
1975	Dancing on a Cold Wind	Carmen	Backing vocals
1977	Low	David Bowie	Backing vocals on "Sound and Vision"
1977	The King of Elfland's Daughter	Bob Johnson and Pete Knight	Lead vocals on "Lizazel" and "Beyond the Fields We Know"
1977	Bad Reputation	Thin Lizzy	Backing vocals on "Dear Lord"
1977	Inventory	Tony Visconti	Backing vocals
1979	Ghostown	The Radiators	Backing vocals on "Walking Home Alone Again"
1981	Cover Plus	Hazel O'Connor	Additional backing vocals
1983	I paladini – Storia d'armi e d'amori	Martin Cooper and David Hughes	Vocals on "Main Theme"
1983	Stages	Elaine Page	Backing vocals on "Running Back for More", "Good Morning Starshine", "What I Did for Love" and "One Night Only"
1986	Christmas	Elaine Page	Backing vocals on 11 songs
1987	Cosmic Dancer – The Greatest Songs	T.Rex/Marc Bolan	Hopkin sang backing vocals on a demo version of "Truck On (Tyke)", which was first released on this Germany-only compilation
1988	Norwegian Wood	R.A.M. Pietsch	Lead vocals on "Here, There and Everywhere" and "For No One"
1988	The Collector – A Marc Cerrone Opéra	Cerrone	Lead vocals on "Evolution" and "The Circle"
1988	Under Milk Wood	Various	Vocals
1992	Back to Bach	Julian Colbeck	Hopkin co-wrote and sang "Old Faces at Heaven's Gate"
1994	The Bridge	Dave Cousins and Brian Willoughby	Backing vocals on "Further Down the Road", "Morning Glory", "Cry No More" and "Do You Remember?"
1994	Blade Runner	Vangelis	Vocals on "Rachael's Song"
1996	Dead Cities	The Future Sound of London	"My Kingdom" samples Hopkins' vocals on Rachael's Song"
1998	Pages of Life	Jon and Vangelis	Backing vocals on "Change We Must" (included on the US and Japan re-release of 1991 album)
1998	Wide Prairie	Linda McCartney	Backing vocals on "Love's Full Glory" (recorded in 1980)
2000	The Great Brain Robbery	The Crocketts	Additional vocals on "Chicken vs. Macho"
2002	Live 2002	Robin Williams	Hopkin re-recorded "Those Were the Days" for use in Williams' "The Grim Rapper"
2003	Blue Angel	Strawbs	Vocals on 7 songs
2005	Those Were the Days	Dolly Parton	Guest vocals on "Those Were the Days"
2008	Crystal Tips and Mighty Mice	The Photos	Backing vocals on "Time of My Life" (album originally withdrawn from release in 1981)
2009	Blodeugerdd: Song of the Flowers – An Anthology of Welsh Music and Song	Various	Hopkins contributed an a cappella version of "Aderyn Pur"
2010	I Am Not	Jessica Lee Morgan	Co-wrote and sang on "Here It All Comes Again"
2018	Re:Boot	Jessica Lee Morgan	Wrote and sang on a reworking of "Here It All Comes Again"
2020	Forthright	Jessica Lee Morgan	Backing vocals on "Packing Up" and "The Less Said the Better" (and also co-wrote the latter)
