= Gamla kära tuffa tuff-tuff-tåget =

Song by Ingmar Nordströms

from the album Saxparty 1
- Language: Swedish
- Released: 1974
- Genre: dansband music
- Label: Frituna
- Songwriter(s): Bert Månson

Gamla kära tuffa tuff-tuff-tåget is a song written by Bert Månson, and originally recorded by Ingmar Nordströms on 1974 album Saxparty 1. Its lyrics deals with memories from travelling by train in a time when steam locomotives were still around the out at the railroads.

In 1975, the song was also recorded by Tre blå & en gul, Cool Candys and Flamingokvintetten on the albums Mera blåtiror, Cool candys go'bitar 6 and 6:an. Cool Candys also released it as a 1975 single with Hej då ha de' så bra acting as a B-side.

In 1976, the song was recorded by Ole dole doff on the albums Kavalkad 1 and in 1978 by Sven-Eric Gissbol on the album Bugg shake & kramisar.

Larz-Kristerz recorded the song on the 2004 album Stuffparty 2. As hidden bonus track was even a reggae version of the song.

In November 2008, a Framåt fredag version was called Fredagskvällen räddas av På spåret.
