= Saxparty 6 =

Studio album by Ingmar Nordströms
- Released: 1979
- Genre: dansband music
- Label: Frituna

Ingmar Nordströms chronology
Saxparty 5 (1978)	Saxparty 6 (1979)	Saxparty 7 (1980)

Saxparty 6 is a 1979 Ingmar Nordströms studio album. In 1991, it was re-released on CD.

== Track listing ==
1. Moonlight Serenade
2. One Way Ticket
3. Why
4. Music Box Dancer
5. But I Do
6. Morgen
7. Darlin'
8. Don Juan
9. Ballade pour Adeline
10. Born to Be Alive
11. Chiquitita
12. Copacabana
13. Harbour Lights
14. Linda
15. Gamla låtar (The Old Spinning Wheel)

== Charts ==
Chart (1979–1980)	Peak position
Sweden (Sverigetopplistan)	6
