= Earth Song/Ocean Song =

1971 album by Mary Hopkin

Studio album by Mary Hopkin
- Released: 1 October 1971
- Recorded: May–June 1971
- Studios: AIR, London
- Genres: Folk; pop
- Length: 39:28
- Label: Apple
- Producer: Tony Visconti

Mary Hopkin chronology
Post Card (1969)	Earth Song/Ocean Song (1971)	Spirit (1989)

Singles from Earth Song/Ocean Song
- 1. "Water, Paper & Clay" Released: 26 November 1971

Earth Song/Ocean Song is the second studio album by the Welsh singer Mary Hopkin, released in October 1971 by Apple Records. It was released over two years after her first album, Post Card, and would be her last for eighteen years.

== Background and recording ==
After signing to the Beatles' record label Apple, Hopkin became a star worldwide in 1968 following the success of "Those Were the Days", produced by Paul McCartney. The ensuing album, Post Card (comprising several songs written by Donovan and a number of show tunes), and follow-up single "Goodbye" in 1969, also both under McCartney's direction, continued Hopkin's success. However, later in the year, Hopkin agreed to stop working with McCartney, as she needed to release more material and he did not have the time. One of the producers put forward was Tony Visconti who had worked on the debut album for labelmate Badfinger (then known as the Iveys). His audition was recording a vocal overdub for Hopkin's Welsh version of "Sparrow". Not knowing who he was, and not realising it was an audition for her next producer, Hopkin did not mention Visconti to Apple, so they assumed he had not made an impression on her. Following this, Apple decided that Mickie Most might be a good fit as he had produced albums by Donovan. Whilst success continued in 1970 with the Most-produced "Temma Harbour" and the Eurovision Song Contest entry "Knock, Knock Who's There?", Hopkin did not agree with his approach as she was not involved in the recording process as much as she wanted to be and had been relegated to just singing the vocals.

Hopkin had grown tired of singing the pop songs that had made her famous and she wanted to experiment with a new musical direction. With her love of folk music, her brother-in-law and manager, Stan, played her the Strawbs' latest album Dragonfly. She later recalled that "it was so underrated, the production was so sparse and beautiful that I thought, that's the guy I want as my producer". The producer was Visconti, though Hopkin did not recognise him until they met. After being asked to meet with Hopkin with the possibility of producing an album, Visconti was initially hesitant given their previous encounter, but eventually agreed. They met on 4 May 1971, the day after Hopkin's twenty-first birthday, and over lunch she spoke about how she was unhappy that Apple saw her as just a pop star as she had initially started out and found success on the television talent show Opportunity Knocks as a folk singer. They discussed making an acoustic album with strings, and Visconti suggest recruiting several well-known folk musicians: Strawbs' lead singer and guitarist Dave Cousins, folk musician Ralph McTell and Pentangle double bassist Danny Thompson. Recording began in May 1971 at AIR Studios in London and was finished by the time Hopkin started a twelve-week summer season performance at the Winter Gardens in Margate in mid-June. According to Visconti, "we didn't make a straight up, honest, organic folk album. We wanted to use modern techniques and evocative sounds to make it a super-folk sounding album".

All of the songs on Earth Song/Ocean Song except "International" were originally published by Essex Music International (later renamed Westminster Music), which had the largest catalogue of folk songs in the UK and was also part of the production company Visconti worked for. Visconti sourced about two hundred songs from which Hopkin selected the songs to record. The exception, "International", was written by Gallagher and Lyle, who were signed to Apple Publishing and had previously written "Sparrow" and "Fields of St. Etienne" for Hopkin. Two of the songs on the album were written by Ralph McTell. The first, "Silver Birch and Weeping Willow" was previously recorded on McTell's third album My Side of Your Window, and the second, "Streets of London", seen as his best-known song, was previously on his second album Spiral Staircase. The album also includes a version of Cat Stevens' "The Wind", first recorded by him for his fifth album Teaser and the Firecat, and also a version of Tom Paxton's "How Come the Sun" from his album of the same name released prior to Earth Song/Ocean Song.

"Water, Paper & Clay" features Hopkin playing the harmonium, though she could not pump the pedals and play at the same time, so whilst she was playing the keyboard, McTell and Thompson were on their knees pumping the pedals. She also recalled that after this, they went to the pub and after getting slightly drunk they went back and recorded the backing vocals. Strawbs' Dave Lambert joined them for this, and Hopkin noted that "he was the only one who could hit the high notes".

== Release and reception ==
Professional ratings
Review scores
Source	Rating
AllMusic	4/5 stars
Encyclopedia of Popular Music	2/5 stars
Robert Christgau	B+
Tom Hull	B+

Prior to being able to record Earth Song/Ocean Song, Apple asked Hopkin to record one more pop song. Visconti chose an adaptation of a French song called "Quand je te regarde vivre" originally recorded by Gilles Marchal in 1970. The adaptation, "Let My Name Be Sorrow", had been recorded and released several months prior to Hopkin by Françoise Hardy. Hopkin's version was released as a single in June 1971, and was not the traditional pop song Apple were expecting, with one reviewer describing it as "probably the nicest thing she has recorded, but also the least commercial".

Earth Song/Ocean Song was released at the beginning of October 1971 in the UK and the following month in the US. Whilst the album was critically well received, it was not a commercial success. One single, "Water, Paper & Clay", was released in November 1971. Reviewing the album for Record Mirror, Bill McAllister praised Hopkin's vocals, the song selection and the arrangements, describing it as "a gorgeous album which you would do well to possess. Charles Langley for the Liverpool Daily Post described it as "a very satisfying album with the timeless qualities of a good singer, good songs and good music woven into certain success". Record World described Hopkin as "the Welsh Circe, [that] raises her lovely and other-worldly voice in a number of new, airy songs".

In Hopkin's words, "I'd finally done the album I wanted to, and Apple was encouraging about that, but I was then tied up in doing these horrendous summer shows, which preventing me from promoting that album. So it sort of fizzled out without a trace, because I wasn't there to promote it". In July 1971, it had been reported that Hopkin had renewed her contract with Apple for a further two years. However, following the release of the album, she decided to leave the record label in March 1972. Having made the album she had always wanted to make, she felt like she there was little left to prove. After marrying Visconti in November 1971, Hopkin gave birth to their first child in November 1972. There had been plans to release a follow-up album to Earth Song/Ocean Song, with a number of songs having been recorded. However, Hopkin decided to more or less withdraw from the music business and focus her attention on raising their child. Over the subsequent decades since, she has released further singles and albums, and contributed backing vocals for a number of different artists.

Apple remastered and reissued their back catalogue on vinyl, CD and cassette during the 1990s, with Earth Song/Ocean Song being reissued on 29 June 1992. An article by the Welsh newspaper Western Mail in August 1992, detailed that very few copies of the reissue had sold in Wales in the weeks since its release. The album was remastered and reissued by Apple for the second time on 25 October 2010, making it available on download and streaming services.

== Track listing ==
Side one
No.	Title	Writer(s)	Length
1.	"International"	Gallagher and Lyle	3:35
2.	"There's Got to Be More"	Harvey Andrews	3:55
3.	"Silver Birch and Weeping Willow"	Ralph McTell	2:48
4.	"How Come the Sun"	Tom Paxton, David Horowitz	5:44
5.	"Earth Song"	Liz Thorsen	3:54

Side two
No.	Title	Writer(s)	Length
6.	"Martha"	Andrews	4:52
7.	"Streets of London"	McTell	4:21
8.	"The Wind"	Cat Stevens	2:04
9.	"Water, Paper & Clay"	Reina and Mike Sutcliffe	4:10
10.	"Ocean Song"	Thorsen	4:05
Total length:			39:28

2010 bonus tracks
No.	Title	Writer(s)	Length
11.	"Kew Gardens" (B-side to "Water, Paper & Clay")	McTell	2:24
12.	"When I Am Old One Day"	Andrews	2:25
13.	"Let My Name Be Sorrow"	Bernard Estardy, Martine Habib	3:29
Total length:			47:46

== Personnel ==
Musicians

- Mary Hopkin – lead vocals, background vocals, guitar (7), harmonium (9)
- Ralph McTell – guitar, twelve-string guitar
- Dave Cousins – guitar, banjo
- Danny Thompson – bass
- Terence Weil – cello
- Clive Anstee – cello
- Pop Arts String Quartet – strings
- Kevin Peek – classical guitar (1)
- Brian Daly – classical guitar (1)
- Tony Visconti – backing vocals, recorder
- Dave Lambert – backing vocals (9)

Technical

- Tony Visconti – production, string arrangements
- Bill Price – engineer
- Alan Harris – engineer
- Ken Scott – mixing
- Ethan Russell – photography
- John Kosh – design

== Charts ==
Chart (1971)	Peak position
US Bubbling Under the Top LPs (Billboard)	204
