= Saxparty 5 =

Studio album by Ingmar Nordströms
- Released: 1978
- Genre: dansband music
- Label: Frituna

Ingmar Nordströms chronology
Saxparty 4 (1977)	Saxparty 5 (1978)	Saxparty 6 (1979)

Saxparty 5 is a 1978 Ingmar Nordströms studio album. In 1991, it was re-released on CD.

== Track listing ==
1. Why Did it Have To Be Me
2. Den ensamme herden
3. Säg det om igen
4. (If You Ever Come To) Amsterdam
5. Silvermåne över bergen
6. Sommar och sol och semester
7. Exodus
8. Poinciana
9. Love System
10. Farväl San Diego
11. Candle On the Water
12. Tack ska du ha
13. Oh, Mein Papa
14. Mah-Na, Mah-Na

== Charts ==
Chart (1978)	Peak position
Sweden (Sverigetopplistan)	6
