= Saxparty 2 =

Studio album by Ingmar Nordströms
- Released: 1975
- Genre: dansband music
- Label: Frituna

Ingmar Nordströms chronology
Saxparty 1 (1974)	Saxparty 2 (1975)	Saxparty 3 (1976)

Saxparty 2 is a 1975 Ingmar Nordströms studio album. In 1991, it was rereleased to CD.

== Track listing ==
1. I Do, I Do, I Do, I Do, I Do
2. Hej då, ha de' så bra
3. Natten har tusen ögon (Cuando Sali de Cuba)
4. Smoke Gets In Your Eyes
5. La Paloma
6. Vårt första sommarlov
7. I'm Leavin' It All Up To You
8. Soleado (When a Child is Born)
9. Bing Bong
10. Alla goda ting är tre (Release Me)
11. Jag ska fria till Maria
12. La Novia
13. En promenad med dej
14. Michelangelo

== Charts ==
Chart (1975)	Peak position
Swedish Albums (Sverigetopplistan)	24
