= Flamingokvintetten 6 =

Studio album by Flamingokvintetten
- Released: 1975
- Genre: Dansband
- Label: Flam

Flamingokvintetten chronology
Flamingokvintetten 5 (1974)	Flamingokvintetten 6 (1975)	Flamingokvintetten 7 (1976)

Flamingokvintetten 6 is the tenth studio album by Swedish dansband Flamingokvintetten, released in 1975. It topped the Swedish albums chart on 27 November 1975.

== Track listing ==
1. "Sjätte September" (Peter Himmelstrand)
2. "Stupid Cupid" (Neil Sedaka, Howard Greenfield)
3. "Hälsa till Marie från mej" (Peter Himmelstrand, bearbetning av "Just a Closer Walk with Thee")
4. "Misaluba" (Giosy Capuano, Mario Capuano)
5. "Alltid ensam" ("Mister Lonely") (Gene Allan, Bobby Vinton, Hasse Carlsson)
6. "Lilla Angeline" ("Poor Little Angeline") (Will Grosz, S. Wilson)
7. "Gamla kära tuffa tuff-tuff-tåget" (Bert Månson)
8. "Lyckans vindar" ("Quanto e Bella Lei") (Daniele Pace, Mario Panzeri, Lorenzo Pilat, Hasse Carlsson)
9. "Blue Moon" (Richard Rodgers, Lorenz Hart)
10. "Han måste gå" ("He'll Have to Go") (Joe Allison, Audrey Allison, Rose-Marie)
11. "Vägen hem" (Karl-Gerhard Lundkvist)
12. "Köp ringar (Der Rattenfänger)" (A. Engelhardt, Stikkan Anderson)
13. "When the Saints Go Marching In" (trad, arr. Av Hasse Carlsson)

== Charts ==
Chart (1975–1976)	Peak position
Norwegian Albums (VG-lista)	4
Swedish Albums (Sverigetopplistan)	1
