= Saxparty 3 =

Studio album by Ingmar Nordströms
- Released: 1976
- Genre: dansband music
- Label: Frituna

Ingmar Nordströms chronology
Saxparty 2 (1975)	Saxparty 3 (1976)	Saxparty 4 (1977)

Saxparty 3 is a 1976 Ingmar Nordströms studio album. In 1988, it was rereleased to CD.

== Track listing ==
1. Sommarmorgon
2. The Elephant Song
3. Rock On
4. Blue Hawaii
5. A La Bonne Heure
6. I Can't Stop Lovin' You
7. Banana Boat Song (Day-O)
8. How High the Moon
9. Indian Summer (Africa)
10. Livet är härligt att leva
11. O Sole Mio
12. Lite närhet
13. Volare
14. In the Mood

== Charts ==
Chart (1976–1977)	Peak position
Swedish Albums (Sverigetopplistan)	3
