= The Glass Menagerie (band) =

English band

- Origin: Manchester, England
- Genres: Psychedelic pop, beat music
- Years active: 1967–1970
- Labels: Pye Records, Polydor Records
- Past members: Lou Stonebridge; Alan Kendall; John Medley; Bill Atkinson; Keith O'Connell

The Glass Menagerie were an English psychedelic pop and beat music band formed in Manchester in 1967, with origins in the Lancashire music scene. Seeking wider commercial success, the group relocated to London, where they released a series of singles during the late 1960s before disbanding in 1970.

== Name ==
The band adopted the name The Glass Menagerie as a literary reference to Tennessee Williams's 1944 memory play, The Glass Menagerie, which was subsequently adapted into a well-known 1950 feature film.

== History ==
Formed in Manchester in August 1967, the initial line-up comprised vocalist and harmonica player Lou Stonebridge, guitarist Alan Kendall, bassist John Medley, drummer Bill Atkinson and keyboardist Keith O'Connell. Kendall and Medley had previously played together in the backing group of The Truth, while Stonebridge, O'Connell and Atkinson had been members of the Burnley group The Raging Storms.

The group initially performed cover versions of material by artists including Blood, Sweat & Tears, Leonard Cohen, The Doors, Traffic, The Lovin' Spoonful and Jefferson Airplane. In 1968 they signed with the John Gunnell agency, obtained a recording contract with Pye Records and moved to London.

During their tenure in the capital, the band recorded three singles for Pye in 1968, including a cover of The Rolling Stones' "She's a Rainbow", followed by "You Didn't Have to Be So Nice" and "Frederick Jordan". The group's version of "She's a Rainbow" was issued as Pye 7N 17518 in 1968. The band also gained exposure through performances on BBC radio programmes presented by John Peel.

O'Connell left the group in 1968 to join Geno Washington & the Ram Jam Band, after which Stonebridge also took over keyboard duties. In 1969, the group signed with Polydor Records and worked with producer Chas Chandler. They released "Have You Forgotten Who You Are" and "Do My Thing Myself", the latter receiving a review in Melody Maker in July 1969.

Although they recorded material for a full-length studio album, Polydor ultimately did not release it commercially.

At the end of 1969, Kendall and Medley left the group. Tony Dangerfield subsequently joined on bass, and the band continued as a three-piece before breaking up in 1970 following a European tour with John Mayall.

Following the break-up, guitarist Alan Kendall joined Toe Fat and subsequently became a member of the Bee Gees. Lou Stonebridge went on to perform with Paladin and McGuinness Flint, while drummer Bill Atkinson subsequently joined Mogul Thrash.

== Discography ==
=== Singles ===
- "She's a Rainbow" / "That's When I Start To Love Her" (Pye Records, 1968)
- "You Didn't Have To Be So Nice" / "Let's All Run To The Sun" (Pye Records, 1968)
- "I Said Goodbye To Me" / "Frederick Jordan" (Pye Records, 1968)
- "Have You Forgotten Who You Are" / "Do You Ever Think" (Polydor Records, 1969)
- "Do My Thing Myself" / "Watching The World Pass By" (Polydor Records, 1969)
