= One More Reggae for the Road =

1979 single by Bill Lovelady

Single by Bill Lovelady

from the album Cheer Up
- B-side: "On the Road"
- Released: 1979
- Genre: Reggae
- Length: 3:51
- Label: Mercury
- Songwriters: Bill Lovelady; Aubrey Cash
- Producers: Bill Lovelady; Clive Crawley

Bill Lovelady singles chronology
"Reggae for It Now" (1979)	"One More Reggae for the Road" (1979)	"She Done Me In" (1980)

Audio
- "One More Reggae for the Road" on YouTube

"One More Reggae for the Road" is a song by English musician Bill Lovelady, released in 1979 as the second single from his upcoming debut album, Cheer Up. The song was co-written by Lovelady and Aubrey Cash. It reached No. 1 in Sweden in July 1980. In Norway, it peaked at No. 2.

Ingmar Nordströms recorded the song on their 1980 studio album Saxparty 7. They also recorded it with lyrics in Swedish by Olle Bergman, as "Ta din reggae en gång till", and released it as a single the same year. They were in the Swedish charts Svensktoppen with the song for five weeks between 30 November 1980–11 January 1981. The song was also recorded in Swedish by Flamingokvintetten and Schytts the same year.

== Charts ==
Chart (1980–1981)	Peak position
Norway (VG-lista)	2
Sweden (Sverigetopplistan)	1

Chart (1991)	Peak position
Sweden (Sverigetopplistan)	17
