= Psalm 104 =

Biblical psalm

- "Bless the LORD, O my soul. O LORD my God, thou art very great"
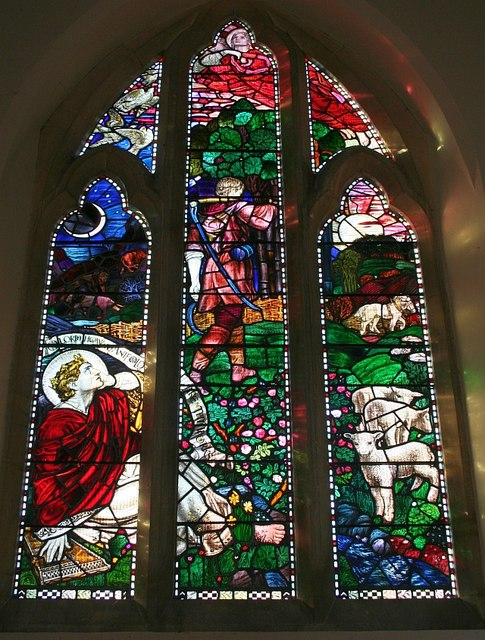
- Psalm 104:24 in the West Window of Hook Church
- Other name: Psalm 103; "Benedic anima mea Domino"
- Language: Hebrew (original)

Psalm 104
- ← Psalm 103 Psalm 105 →
- Book: Book of Psalms
- Hebrew Bible part: Ketuvim
- Order in the Hebrew part: 1
- Category: Sifrei Emet
- Christian Bible part: Old Testament
- Order in the Christian part: 19

Psalm 104 is the 104th psalm of the Book of Psalms, beginning in Hebrew "ברכי נפשי" (barachi nafshi: "bless my soul"); in English in the King James Version: "Bless the LORD, O my soul. O LORD my God, thou art very great". In the slightly different numbering system used in the Greek Septuagint and the Latin Vulgate version of the Bible, this psalm is Psalm 103. In Latin, it is known as "Benedic anima mea Domino".

Psalm 104 is used as a regular part of Jewish, Eastern Orthodox, Catholic, Lutheran, Anglican and other Protestant liturgies. It has often been set to music, including works by John Dowland, Heinrich Schütz, Philip Glass and William Lovelady.

The inaugural occurrence of the term "Hallelujah" within the Old Testament can be identified in Psalm 104, with subsequent instances found in Psalms 105 and 106. Notably, O. Palmer Robertson perceives these Psalms as a cohesive triad, serving as the concluding compositions of Book 4. Hallelujah will also appear in Psalms 113, 117, 135 and 146 through 150.

The psalm bears a notable resemblance to Akhenaten's Great Hymn to the Aten, written some 400 years earlier in Egypt.

== Structure ==
vanGemeren notes a chiastic structure in Psalm 104, and Grogan notes that the structure follows the creation narrative in Genesis 1:

Chiastic structure and Genesis creation narrative Parallel in Psalm 104
| Chiastic structure | Genesis 1 Creation Narrative Day |
|---|---|
| A: In Praise of God's royal splendor (1–4) | 1–2 |
| B: The material formation of the earth (5–9) | 3 |
| C: The glory of animal creation (10–18) | 5 (chiasm) |
| D: The regularity of the created world (19–23) | 4 and 5 |
| C': The glory of animal creation (24–26) | 4 and 5 |
| B': The spiritual sustenance of the earth (27–30) | |
| A': In Praise of God's royal splendor (31–35) | |

== Contents ==
One of the longer psalms, Psalm 104 is traditionally divided into 35 verses.

The titles below are those of vanGemeren.

=== Verses 1–4: In Praise of God's Royal Splendor ===
This echoes the first two days of creation in Genesis 1, and describes God as king moving through his royal dwelling. It begins by describing the glory of God ("Who coverest thyself with light as with a garment" v. 2). This could also be rendered "you... who wraps... who stretches...".

- Verse 2 shows the ease with which God acts. He spreads out the heavens as one would spread out a tent.

=== Verses 5–9: The Material Formation of the Earth ===
This covers day 3 of creation in Genesis 1, and with the next section, describes the functioning and ordering of the world, and makes it clear that even "the deep" is created by God, and not something existing "prior to" God, as in Babylonian creation mythology.

- Verse 5 asserts that God has "laid the foundations [מכון] of the Earth".
- Verse 7: "Rebuke" does not imply judgment, but absolute control of the elements.
- Verse 9 not only refers to Genesis 1:9-10, but also the covenant with Noah in Genesis 8:21-22 and 9:8-17.

=== Verses 10–18: The Glory of Animal Creation ===
A minor chiasm is evident:

A i. Water in the mountains (v.10)

ii. Wild animals (v.11)

iii. Birds (v.12)

B i. Water in the mountains (v.13)

ii. Domesticated animals, plants, man (vv.14–15)

A′ i. Water in the mountains (v.16)

iii. Birds (v.16)

ii. Mountain animals (vv.17–18)

- Verse 10 (water flowing down) replaces water flowing over (verse 8). A home is made for the creatures.

=== Verses 19–23: The Regularity of the Created World ===
This and the following section cover days 4 and 5 of the Genesis 1 creation story. See the section on the Aten hymn below for similarities to the Egyptian hymn.

=== Verses 24–26: The Glory of Animal Creation ===
- Verse 26 mentions the Leviathan (sea monster) in a way that emphasizes that it is just another one of God's creatures, likened to an object of entertainment, and not a challenge to his authority, as was believed by surrounding Canaanite tribes

=== Verses 27–30: The Spiritual Sustenance of the Earth ===
- Verses 27–30 emphasise how all creatures still depend on the ongoing attention and provision of the creator, and perish should he avert his attention.
- Verse 30 reads "Thou sendest forth thy spirit, they are created: and thou renewest the face of the earth." (KJV)

=== Verses 31–35: In Praise of God's Royal Splendor ===
- The concluding verses end where the Psalm began, reiterating the power and glory of YHWH, and the composer expresses his adoration, and, in the final verse, his wish that the sinners (חטא) and wicked (רשע) be "consumed out of the earth".

In the Masoretic text, the phrase Hallelujah is placed at the end of the final verse, and is seen as the introduction of the next Psalm. This is lacking in the Septuagint and the Vulgate, but it is rendered by the KJV as "Praise ye the LORD".

== Similarity to the Great Hymn to the Aten ==
Psalm 104 bears similarities to the Egyptian Great Hymn to the Aten (14th century BC), which is frequently cited as a parallel text. in particular:

Parallel Between the Aten Hymn and Psalm 104
| Aten Hymn | Content | Psalm 104 |
|---|---|---|
| ii 7 – iii 10 | A lion leaves its den after dark, and people rise at dawn to take up their work. | 104:20–23 |
| iv 8–11 | "Ships go downstream or upstream as well... The fish in the river dart about in your sight and your beams are deep in the Great Green Sea." | 104:25–26 |
| vii 1–8 | Creation of cattle, humans, and every sort of small beast. Proclaims: "How various are the things you have created, and they are all mysterious in your sight." | 104:24 |

Grogan, Craigie, and Zimmerli note that as with parallels to other Ancient Near Eastern creation narratives in Genesis 1, the difference between the Biblical and other Ancient Near Eastern accounts is that in the Biblical narratives, the sun and other parts of creation are not gods, but creations themselves. The psalm is polemical and therefore "implicitly antipagan" (Grogan). Rather than copying from the Aten hymn, Psalm 104 is understood to be commenting or criticizing. This is further reinforced by the structure, in which the focal point of the chiasm is the orderliness of nature in which the celestial bodies are time keepers rather than deities.

Biblical scholar Mark S. Smith has commented that "Despite enduring support for the comparison of the two texts, enthusiasm for even indirect influence has been tempered in recent decades. In some quarters, the argument for any form of influence is simply rejected outright. Still some Egyptologists, such as Jan Assmann and Donald Redford, argue for Egyptian influence on both the Amarna correspondence (especially in EA 147) and on Psalm 104". vanGemeren concludes that "though this matter has received extensive treatment (See Allen pp.28–30) any discussion on the literary association is complicated by the insufficient evidence of the cosmological framework of the surrounding nations and, hence, by the tentativeness of any theory explaining the relations and possible polemical use of these materials".

== Uses ==
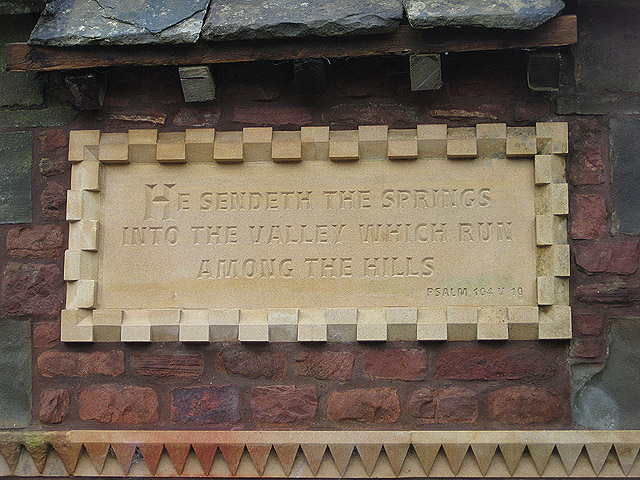
Psalm 104:10, displayed on the restored well at Clearwell, once known as Wellington, in the Forest of Dean, West Gloucestershire, England (2008)

=== New Testament ===
In the New Testament, verse 4 is quoted in Hebrews 1:7.

=== Judaism ===
- Many Observant Jews recite Psalm 104 during morning services on the New Moon (Rosh Chodesh), though customs vary.
- It is recited in many communities following the Shabbat Mincha between Sukkot and Shabbat Hagadol.
- Some recite verses 1–2 upon donning the tallit during morning services.
- Verse 24 is part of Hameir La'aretz in the Blessings before the Shema during Shacharit and is found in Pirkei Avot Chapter 6, no. 10.
- Verse 31 is the first verse of Yehi Kivod in Pesukei Dezimra, is part of Baruch Hashem L'Olam during Maariv, and is recited when opening the Hakafot on Simchat Torah.

=== Eastern Orthodox Church ===
In the Eastern Orthodox Church, Psalm 103 (Psalm 104 in the Masoretic Text) is read daily at the beginning of Vespers, marking the start of a new liturgical day. It is part of the fourteenth Kathisma division of the Psalter, read at Matins on Thursday mornings, as well as on Tuesdays and Fridays during Lent, at the Third Hour and Matins, respectively.

At Vespers, Psalm 103/104 is traditionally appointed to be read by the senior reader (that is, the bishop if he is present, the elder or abbot of a monastery, or the senior reader at the kliros). On festal days when the All-Night Vigil is served, this Psalm is sung by a choir, traditionally with various refrains between verses.

In the context of Vespers, this Psalm is understood to be a hymn of creation, in all the fulness wherein God has created it – it speaks of animals, plants, waters, skies, etc. In the scope of the liturgical act, it is often taken to be Adam's song, sung outside the closed gates of Eden from which he has been expelled (cf. Genesis 3). While the reader chants the psalm, the priest stands outside the closed Royal Doors wearing only his epitrachilion, making this symbolism more evident.

=== Catholic Church ===
This psalm is used during the Easter Vigil on Holy Saturday night (the Vigil being the inauguration of the fifty-day Easter season, the end of Holy Week – and by extension Lent – and the ending of the three-day Easter Triduum of Holy Thursday, Good Friday, and Easter). In the Liturgy of the Word, the first reading is the Creation story of the Book of Genesis, and Psalm 104, which deals with the same material, is the responsorial psalm. It is used again on Pentecost Sunday, at the end of the Easter season, as a responsorial psalm during the Vigil Mass, and again at the Sunday's "Mass during the Day", with the response modeled on verse 30.

=== Book of Common Prayer ===
In the Church of England's Book of Common Prayer, this psalm is appointed to be read on the evening of the twentieth day of the month, as well as at Evensong on Whitsunday.

=== Literal interpretations ===
Verse 9 was interpreted by theologian Jaime Pérez de Valencia (1408-1490) as a corroboration of classical geographer Claudius Ptolemy's hypothesis that the planet's oceans were entirely surrounded by land.

=== Popular culture ===
German philosopher Johann Gottfried Herder remarked, "It is worth studying the Hebrew language for ten years in order to read Psalm 104 in the original".

Musician Bob Marley believed that cannabis use was prevalent in the Bible, reading passages such as the 14th verse of Psalm 104 as showing approval of its usage.

== Musical settings ==
In The Whole Booke of Psalmes, published by Thomas Est in 1592, Psalm 104 is set by John Dowland in English, "My soul praise the Lord". Heinrich Schütz composed a four-part setting to a metric German text, "Herr, dich lob die Seele mein", SVW 202, for the 1628 Becker Psalter. In his 1726 cantata Es wartet alles auf dich, BWV 187, Bach set verses 27 and 28 in the first movement.

The hymn "O Worship the King" by Sir Robert Grant, first published in 1833, is based on the psalm.

Psalm 104, verse 4, was arranged for mixed chorus by Miriam Shatal in 1960.

Psalm 104, in Hebrew, is set as part of Akhnaten, an opera by Philip Glass.

Prince Philip, Duke of Edinburgh, commissioned a setting of Psalm 104 by William Lovelady to mark his 75th birthday. An abridged version of the cantata for four-part choir and organ was performed for his funeral service on 17 April 2021 in St George's Chapel, Windsor.

== Text ==
The following table shows the Hebrew text of the Psalm with vowels, alongside the Koine Greek text in the Septuagint and the English translation from the King James Version. Note that the meaning can slightly differ between these versions, as the Septuagint and the Masoretic Text come from different textual traditions. (Note: A 1917 translation directly from Hebrew to English by the Jewish Publication Society can be found here or here, and an 1844 translation directly from the Septuagint by L. C. L. Brenton can be found here. Both translations are in the public domain.) In the Septuagint, this psalm is numbered Psalm 103.

| # | Hebrew | English | Greek |
|---|---|---|---|
| 1 | בָּרְכִ֥י נַפְשִׁ֗י אֶת־יְ֫הֹוָ֥ה יְהֹוָ֣ה אֱ֭לֹהַי גָּדַ֣לְתָּ מְּאֹ֑ד ה֖וֹד וְהָדָ֣ר לָבָֽשְׁתָּ׃ | Bless the LORD, O my soul. O LORD my God, thou art very great; thou art clothed with honour and majesty. | Τῷ Δαυΐδ. - ΕΥΛΟΓΕΙ, ἡ ψυχή μου, τὸν Κύριον. Κύριε ὁ Θεός μου, ἐμεγαλύνθης σφόδρα, ἐξομολόγησιν καὶ μεγαλοπρέπειαν ἐνεδύσω |
| 2 | עֹֽטֶה־א֭וֹר כַּשַּׂלְמָ֑ה נוֹטֶ֥ה שָׁ֝מַ֗יִם כַּיְרִיעָֽה׃ | Who coverest thyself with light as with a garment: who stretchest out the heavens like a curtain: | ἀναβαλλόμενος φῶς ὡς ἱμάτιον, ἐκτείνων τὸν οὐρανὸν ὡσεὶ δέρριν· |
| 3 | הַ֥מְקָרֶ֥ה בַמַּ֗יִם עֲֽלִיּ֫וֹתָ֥יו הַשָּׂם־עָבִ֥ים רְכוּב֑וֹ הַֽ֝מְהַלֵּ֗ךְ עַל־כַּנְפֵי־רֽוּחַ׃ | Who layeth the beams of his chambers in the waters: who maketh the clouds his chariot: who walketh upon the wings of the wind: | ὁ στεγάζων ἐν ὕδασι τὰ ὑπερῷα αὐτοῦ, ὁ τιθεὶς νέφη τὴν ἐπίβασιν αὐτοῦ, ὁ περιπατῶν ἐπὶ πτερύγων ἀνέμων· |
| 4 | עֹשֶׂ֣ה מַלְאָכָ֣יו רוּח֑וֹת מְ֝שָׁרְתָ֗יו אֵ֣שׁ לֹהֵֽט׃ | Who maketh his angels spirits; his ministers a flaming fire: | ὁ ποιῶν τοὺς ἀγγέλους αὐτοῦ πνεύματα καὶ τοὺς λειτουργοὺς αὐτοῦ πυρὸς φλόγα. |
| 5 | יָֽסַד־אֶ֭רֶץ עַל־מְכוֹנֶ֑יהָ בַּל־תִּ֝מּ֗וֹט עוֹלָ֥ם וָעֶֽד׃ | Who laid the foundations of the earth, that it should not be removed for ever. | ὁ θεμελιῶν τὴν γῆν ἐπὶ τὴν ἀσφάλειαν αὐτῆς, οὐ κλιθήσεται εἰς τὸν αἰῶνα τοῦ αἰῶνος. |
| 6 | תְּ֭הוֹם כַּלְּב֣וּשׁ כִּסִּית֑וֹ עַל־הָ֝רִ֗ים יַ֖עַמְדוּ מָֽיִם׃ | Thou coveredst it with the deep as with a garment: the waters stood above the mountains. | ἄβυσσος ὡς ἱμάτιον τὸ περιβόλαιον αὐτοῦ, ἐπὶ τῶν ὀρέων στήσονται ὕδατα· |
| 7 | מִן־גַּעֲרָ֣תְךָ֣ יְנוּס֑וּן מִן־ק֥וֹל רַֽ֝עַמְךָ֗ יֵחָפֵזֽוּן׃ | At thy rebuke they fled; at the voice of thy thunder they hasted away. | ἀπὸ ἐπιτιμήσεώς σου φεύξονται, ἀπὸ φωνῆς βροντῆς σου δειλιάσουσιν. |
| 8 | יַעֲל֣וּ הָ֭רִים יֵרְד֣וּ בְקָע֑וֹת אֶל־מְ֝ק֗וֹם זֶ֤ה ׀ יָסַ֬דְתָּ לָהֶֽם׃ | They go up by the mountains; they go down by the valleys unto the place which thou hast founded for them. | ἀναβαίνουσιν ὄρη καὶ καταβαίνουσι πεδία εἰς τὸν τόπον ὃν ἐθεμελίωσας αὐτά· |
| 9 | גְּֽבוּל־שַׂ֭מְתָּ בַּל־יַעֲבֹר֑וּן בַּל־יְ֝שֻׁב֗וּן לְכַסּ֥וֹת הָאָֽרֶץ׃ | Thou hast set a bound that they may not pass over; that they turn not again to cover the earth. | ὅριον ἔθου, ὃ οὐ παρελεύσονται, οὐδὲ ἐπιστρέψουσι καλύψαι τὴν γῆν. |
| 10 | הַֽמְשַׁלֵּ֣חַ מַ֭עְיָנִים בַּנְּחָלִ֑ים בֵּ֥ין הָ֝רִ֗ים יְהַלֵּכֽוּן׃ | He sendeth the springs into the valleys, which run among the hills. | ὁ ἐξαποστέλλων πηγὰς ἐν φάραγξιν, ἀνὰ μέσον τῶν ὀρέων διελεύσονται ὕδατα· |
| 11 | יַ֭שְׁקוּ כׇּל־חַיְת֣וֹ שָׂדָ֑י יִשְׁבְּר֖וּ פְרָאִ֣ים צְמָאָֽם׃ | They give drink to every beast of the field: the wild asses quench their thirst. | ποτιοῦσι πάντα τὰ θηρία τοῦ ἀγροῦ, προσδέξονται ὄναγροι εἰς δίψαν αὐτῶν· |
| 12 | עֲ֭לֵיהֶם עוֹף־הַשָּׁמַ֣יִם יִשְׁכּ֑וֹן מִבֵּ֥ין עֳ֝פָאיִ֗ם יִתְּנוּ־קֽוֹל׃ | By them shall the fowls of the heaven have their habitation, which sing among the branches. | ἐπ᾿ αὐτὰ τὰ πετεινὰ τοῦ οὐρανοῦ κατασκηνώσει, ἐκ μέσου τῶν πετρῶν δώσουσι φωνήν. |
| 13 | מַשְׁקֶ֣ה הָ֭רִים מֵעֲלִיּוֹתָ֑יו מִפְּרִ֥י מַ֝עֲשֶׂ֗יךָ תִּשְׂבַּ֥ע הָאָֽרֶץ׃ | He watereth the hills from his chambers: the earth is satisfied with the fruit of thy works. | ποτίζων ὄρη ἐκ τῶν ὑπερῴων αὐτοῦ, ἀπὸ καρποῦ τῶν ἔργων σου χορτασθήσεται ἡ γῆ. |
| 14 | מַצְמִ֤יחַ חָצִ֨יר ׀ לַבְּהֵמָ֗ה וְ֭עֵשֶׂב לַעֲבֹדַ֣ת הָאָדָ֑ם לְה֥וֹצִיא לֶ֝֗חֶם מִן־הָאָֽרֶץ׃ | He causeth the grass to grow for the cattle, and herb for the service of man: that he may bring forth food out of the earth; | ὁ ἐξανατέλλων χόρτον τοῖς κτήνεσι καὶ χλόην τῇ δουλείᾳ τῶν ἀνθρώπων τοῦ ἐξαγαγεῖν ἄρτον ἐκ τῆς γῆς· |
| 15 | וְיַ֤יִן ׀ יְשַׂמַּ֬ח לְֽבַב־אֱנ֗וֹשׁ לְהַצְהִ֣יל פָּנִ֣ים מִשָּׁ֑מֶן וְ֝לֶ֗חֶם לְֽבַב־אֱנ֥וֹשׁ יִסְעָֽד׃ | And wine that maketh glad the heart of man, and oil to make his face to shine, and bread which strengtheneth man's heart. | καὶ οἶνος εὐφραίνει καρδίαν ἀνθρώπου τοῦ ἱλαρῦναι πρόσωπον ἐν ἐλαίῳ, καὶ ἄρτος καρδίαν ἀνθρώπου στηρίζει. |
| 16 | יִ֭שְׂבְּעוּ עֲצֵ֣י יְהֹוָ֑ה אַֽרְזֵ֥י לְ֝בָנ֗וֹן אֲשֶׁ֣ר נָטָֽע׃ | The trees of the LORD are full of sap; the cedars of Lebanon, which he hath planted; | χορτασθήσονται τὰ ξύλα τοῦ πεδίου, αἱ κέδροι τοῦ Λιβάνου, ἃς ἐφύτευσας. |
| 17 | אֲשֶׁר־שָׁ֭ם צִפֳּרִ֣ים יְקַנֵּ֑נוּ חֲ֝סִידָ֗ה בְּרוֹשִׁ֥ים בֵּיתָֽהּ׃ | Where the birds make their nests: as for the stork, the fir trees are her house. | ἐκεῖ στρουθία ἐννοσσεύσουσι, τοῦ ἐρωδιοῦ ἡ οἰκία ἡγεῖται αὐτῶν. |
| 18 | הָרִ֣ים הַ֭גְּבֹהִים לַיְּעֵלִ֑ים סְ֝לָעִ֗ים מַחְסֶ֥ה לַֽשְׁפַנִּֽים׃ | The high hills are a refuge for the wild goats; and the rocks for the conies. | ὄρη τὰ ὑψηλὰ ταῖς ἐλάφοις, πέτρα καταφυγὴ τοῖς λαγωοῖς. |
| 19 | עָשָׂ֣ה יָ֭רֵחַ לְמוֹעֲדִ֑ים שֶׁ֝֗מֶשׁ יָדַ֥ע מְבוֹאֽוֹ׃ | He appointed the moon for seasons: the sun knoweth his going down. | ἐποίησε σελήνην εἰς καιρούς, ὁ ἥλιος ἔγνω τὴν δύσιν αὐτοῦ. |
| 20 | תָּֽשֶׁת־חֹ֭שֶׁךְ וִ֣יהִי לָ֑יְלָה בּוֹ־תִ֝רְמֹ֗שׂ כׇּל־חַיְתוֹ־יָֽעַר׃ | Thou makest darkness, and it is night: wherein all the beasts of the forest do creep forth. | ἔθου σκότος, καὶ ἐγένετο νύξ· ἐν αὐτῇ διελεύσονται πάντα τὰ θηρία τοῦ δρυμοῦ. |
| 21 | הַ֭כְּפִירִים שֹׁאֲגִ֣ים לַטָּ֑רֶף וּלְבַקֵּ֖שׁ מֵאֵ֣ל אׇכְלָֽם׃ | The young lions roar after their prey, and seek their meat from God. | σκύμνοι ὠρυόμενοι τοῦ ἁρπάσαι καὶ ζητῆσαι παρὰ τῷ Θεῷ βρῶσιν αὐτοῖς. |
| 22 | תִּזְרַ֣ח הַ֭שֶּׁמֶשׁ יֵאָסֵפ֑וּן וְאֶל־מְ֝עוֹנֹתָ֗ם יִרְבָּצֽוּן׃ | The sun ariseth, they gather themselves together, and lay them down in their dens. | ἀνέτειλεν ὁ ἥλιος, καὶ συνήχθησαν καὶ εἰς τὰς μάνδρας αὐτῶν κοιτασθήσονται. |
| 23 | יֵצֵ֣א אָדָ֣ם לְפׇעֳל֑וֹ וְֽלַעֲבֹ֖דָת֣וֹ עֲדֵי־עָֽרֶב׃ | Man goeth forth unto his work and to his labour until the evening. | ἐξελεύσεται ἄνθρωπος ἐπὶ τὸ ἔργον αὐτοῦ καὶ ἐπὶ τὴν ἐργασίαν αὐτοῦ ἕως ἑσπέρας. |
| 24 | מָה־רַבּ֬וּ מַעֲשֶׂ֨יךָ ׀ יְֽהֹוָ֗ה כֻּ֭לָּם בְּחׇכְמָ֣ה עָשִׂ֑יתָ מָלְאָ֥ה הָ֝אָ֗רֶץ קִנְיָנֶֽךָ׃ | O LORD, how manifold are thy works! in wisdom hast thou made them all: the earth is full of thy riches. | ὡς ἐμεγαλύνθη τὰ ἔργα σου, Κύριε· πάντα ἐν σοφίᾳ ἐποίησας, ἐπληρώθη ἡ γῆ τῆς κτίσεώς σου. |
| 25 | זֶ֤ה ׀ הַיָּ֥ם גָּדוֹל֮ וּרְחַ֢ב יָ֫דָ֥יִם שָֽׁם־רֶ֭מֶשׂ וְאֵ֣ין מִסְפָּ֑ר חַיּ֥וֹת קְ֝טַנּ֗וֹת עִם־גְּדֹלֽוֹת׃ | So is this great and wide sea, wherein are things creeping innumerable, both small and great beasts. | αὕτη ἡ θάλασσα ἡ μεγάλη καὶ εὐρύχωρος, ἐκεῖ ἑρπετά, ὧν οὐκ ἔστιν ἀριθμός, ζῷα μικρὰ μετὰ μεγάλων· |
| 26 | שָׁ֭ם אֳנִיּ֣וֹת יְהַלֵּכ֑וּן לִ֝וְיָתָ֗ן זֶֽה־יָצַ֥רְתָּ לְשַֽׂחֶק־בּֽוֹ׃ | There go the ships: there is that leviathan, whom thou hast made to play therein. | ἐκεῖ πλοῖα διαπορεύονται, δράκων οὗτος, ὃν ἔπλασας ἐμπαίζειν αὐτῇ. |
| 27 | כֻּ֭לָּם אֵלֶ֣יךָ יְשַׂבֵּר֑וּן לָתֵ֖ת אׇכְלָ֣ם בְּעִתּֽוֹ׃ | These wait all upon thee; that thou mayest give them their meat in due season. | πάντα πρὸς σὲ προσδοκῶσι, δοῦναι τὴν τροφὴν αὐτῶν εἰς εὔκαιρον. |
| 28 | תִּתֵּ֣ן לָ֭הֶם יִלְקֹט֑וּן תִּפְתַּ֥ח יָ֝דְךָ֗ יִשְׂבְּע֥וּן טֽוֹב׃ | That thou givest them they gather: thou openest thine hand, they are filled with good. | δόντος σου αὐτοῖς συλλέξουσιν, ἀνοίξαντός σου τὴν χεῖρα, τὰ σύμπαντα πλησθήσονται χρηστότητος. |
| 29 | תַּסְתִּ֥יר פָּנֶיךָ֮ יִֽבָּהֵ֫ל֥וּן תֹּסֵ֣ף ר֭וּחָם יִגְוָע֑וּן וְֽאֶל־עֲפָרָ֥ם יְשׁוּבֽוּן׃ | Thou hidest thy face, they are troubled: thou takest away their breath, they die, and return to their dust. | ἀποστρέψαντος δέ σου τὸ πρόσωπον ταραχθήσονται· ἀντανελεῖς τὸ πνεῦμα αὐτῶν, καὶ ἐκλείψουσι καὶ εἰς τὸν χοῦν αὐτῶν ἐπιστρέψουσιν. |
| 30 | תְּשַׁלַּ֣ח ר֭וּחֲךָ יִבָּרֵא֑וּן וּ֝תְחַדֵּ֗שׁ פְּנֵ֣י אֲדָמָֽה׃ | Thou sendest forth thy spirit, they are created: and thou renewest the face of the earth. | ἐξαποστελεῖς τὸ πνεῦμά σου, καὶ κτισθήσονται, καὶ ἀνακαινιεῖς τὸ πρόσωπον τῆς γῆς. |
| 31 | יְהִ֤י כְב֣וֹד יְהֹוָ֣ה לְעוֹלָ֑ם יִשְׂמַ֖ח יְהֹוָ֣ה בְּמַעֲשָֽׂיו׃ | The glory of the LORD shall endure for ever: the LORD shall rejoice in his works. | ἤτω ἡ δόξα Κυρίου εἰς τοὺς αἰῶνας, εὐφρανθήσεται Κύριος ἐπὶ τοῖς ἔργοις αὐτοῦ· |
| 32 | הַמַּבִּ֣יט לָ֭אָרֶץ וַתִּרְעָ֑ד יִגַּ֖ע בֶּהָרִ֣ים וְֽיֶעֱשָֽׁנוּ׃ | He looketh on the earth, and it trembleth: he toucheth the hills, and they smoke. | ὁ ἐπιβλέπων ἐπὶ τὴν γῆν καὶ ποιῶν αὐτὴν τρέμειν, ὁ ἁπτόμενος τῶν ὀρέων καὶ καπνίζονται. |
| 33 | אָשִׁ֣ירָה לַיהֹוָ֣ה בְּחַיָּ֑י אֲזַמְּרָ֖ה לֵאלֹהַ֣י בְּעוֹדִֽי׃ | I will sing unto the LORD as long as I live: I will sing praise to my God while I have my being. | ᾄσω τῷ Κυρίῳ ἐν τῇ ζωῇ μου, ψαλῶ τῷ Θεῷ μου ἕως ὑπάρχω· |
| 34 | יֶעֱרַ֣ב עָלָ֣יו שִׂיחִ֑י אָ֝נֹכִ֗י אֶשְׂמַ֥ח בַּיהֹוָֽה׃ | My meditation of him shall be sweet: I will be glad in the LORD. | ἡδυνθείη αὐτῷ ἡ διαλογή μου, ἐγὼ δὲ εὐφρανθήσομαι ἐπὶ τῷ Κυρίῳ. |
| 35 | יִתַּ֤מּוּ חַטָּאִ֨ים ׀ מִן־הָאָ֡רֶץ וּרְשָׁעִ֤ים ׀ ע֤וֹד אֵינָ֗ם בָּרְכִ֣י נַ֭פְשִׁי אֶת־יְהֹוָ֗ה הַֽלְלוּ־יָֽהּ׃ | Let the sinners be consumed out of the earth, and let the wicked be no more. Bless thou the LORD, O my soul. Praise ye the LORD. | ἐκλείποιεν ἁμαρτωλοὶ ἀπὸ τῆς γῆς καὶ ἄνομοι, ὥστε μὴ ὑπάρχειν αὐτούς. εὐλόγει, ἡ ψυχή μου, τὸν Κύριον. |

== See also ==
- Rigans montes (Aquinas)

== Sources ==
- Nosson Scherman, The Complete Artscroll Siddur, Artscroll Mesorah Series (1985).
- Hermann Gunkel, Die Psalmen (1925, 6th ed. 1986), pp. 447ff.; English translation T. M. Horner, The Psalms: a form-critical introduction (1926, reprint 1967).
