= Saxparty 1 =

Studio album by Ingmar Nordströms
- Released: 1974
- Genre: dansband music
- Label: Frituna

Ingmar Nordströms chronology
| Vi vill sjunga, vi vill spela (1973) | Saxparty 1 (1974) | Saxparty 2 (1975) |

Saxparty 1 is a 1974 Ingmar Nordströms studio album.

== Track listing ==
1. Partajlåten (På partaj) (Bert Månson)
2. Farfars gamla slitna överrock (Gunnar Sandevärn)
3. Make this Night Last Forever (James Last)
4. Tack hej (Bert Månson)
5. Vi ses igen (Bert Månson)
6. Honey, Honey (Stikkan Anderson, Benny Andersson, Björn Ulvaeus)
7. Rena fina Rut (Gunnar Sandevärn)
8. Gamla kära tuffa tuff-tuff-tåget (Bert Månson)
9. Goodbye My Love, Goodbye (Klaus Munro, Mario Panas)
10. Tchip Tchip (Terry Rendall, Thomas Werner)
11. Only You (Buck Owens)
12. Bjud upp till en dans (Bert Månson)
