= Oasis (Oasis album) =

Studio album by Oasis
- Released: 20 April 1984
- Recorded: 1984
- Studio: Solid Bond (London, UK); Trident II (London)
- Genre: Easy listening; adult contemporary
- Length: 46:01
- Label: WEA
- Producer: Peter Skellern

Oasis is the only studio album by 1980s group Oasis (not the 1990s rock band of the same name). The album was recorded at Solid Bond Studios and Trident II Studios in London. It was mixed at Trident II Studios. The album peaked at No. 23 on the UK Albums Chart, staying there for 14 weeks.

== Track listing ==
=== Side One ===
1. "Prelude" – 2.14 (Peter Skellern)
2. "If This Be the Last Time" – 4.18 (Peter Skellern)
3. "I Wonder Why" – 3.51 (music: Bill Lovelady / lyrics: Marita Phillips)
4. "Hold Me" – 4.10 (Peter Skellern)
5. "Oasis" – 5.39 (Peter Skellern)

=== Side Two ===
1. "Sirocco" – 6.17 (music: Bill Lovelady & Mitch Dalton / lyrics: Marita Phillips)
2. "Who Knows" – 4.55 (Peter Skellern)
3. "Weavers of Moonbeams" – 5.01 (Peter Skellern)
4. "Loved and Lost" – 5.13 (Peter Skellern)
5. "True Love" – 4.23 (Cole Porter)

== Personnel ==
- Peter Skellern – vocals, keyboards, synths
- Mary Hopkin – vocals
- Julian Lloyd Webber – cello
- Bill Lovelady – guitar
- Mitch Dalton – guitar
- Andy Pask – bass
- Charlie Morgan – drums
- Tristan Fry – marimbas
- Frank Ricotti – percussion
