= Saxparty 4 =

Studio album by Ingmar Nordströms
- Released: 1977
- Genre: dansband music
- Label: Frituna

Ingmar Nordströms chronology
Saxparty 3 (1976)	Saxparty 4 (1977)	Saxparty 5 (1978)

Saxparty 4 is a 1977 Ingmar Nordströms studio album. In 1991, it was re-released on CD.

== Track listing ==
1. Chanson D'Amour
2. Bye, Bye, Bye Little Butterfly
3. Sailing
4. Härliga Sommarö
5. Red Sails in the Sunset
6. Du är den som allting handlar om
7. Humlans Flykt (The Flight of the Bumble-Bee)
8. Han är min sång och min glädje (There Goes My Everything)
9. Rara Underbara Katarina
10. Verde
11. Strangers in the Night
12. Du har gett mig toner till en sång
13. Öresund
14. Love is a Many Splendoured Thing

== Charts ==
Chart (1977–1978)	Peak position
Sweden (Sverigetopplistan)	3
