= Philip Kinorra =

- Also known as: Julien Covey; Julian Covey; Philamore Lincoln
- Born: Robert Cromwell Anson; 20 October 1940 (age 85); Sherwood, Nottingham, England
- Genres: Jazz, rock
- Occupation: Musician
- Instruments: Drums, vocals

Philip Kinorra (born Robert Cromwell Anson; 20 October 1940), also known by his other stage names, Julian Covey, Julien Covey, and Philamore Lincoln, is a British drummer, singer, songwriter and record producer.

Born in Nottingham, he performed in the early 1960s with Brian Auger and the Trinity, Graham Bond, and Don Rendell, devising his stage name as a combination of the names of fellow drummers Phil Seamen, Tony Kinsey and Bobby Orr. In the mid-1960s he formed his own band, Julian Covey & The Machine, for which he drummed and sang.

Deciding to go solo, he adopted the pseudonym "Philamore Lincoln" and was signed to the US label Epic Records. His only solo album, The North Wind Blew South, was released in 1970 and includes his song "Temma Harbour", which was a hit when recorded as a single by Mary Hopkin in the same year. In the UK he was signed to Brian Epstein’s NEMS label and issued one single, "Running By The River" b/w "Rainy Day", before NEMS folded.

In 1971 and 1972 he produced two albums for the British progressive rock band Paladin, but he became disillusioned with the music industry and moved to Dorset with his wife. As of 2015 he was living in Oxford.
