= Rigans montes (Aquinas) =

Speech by Thomas Aquinas

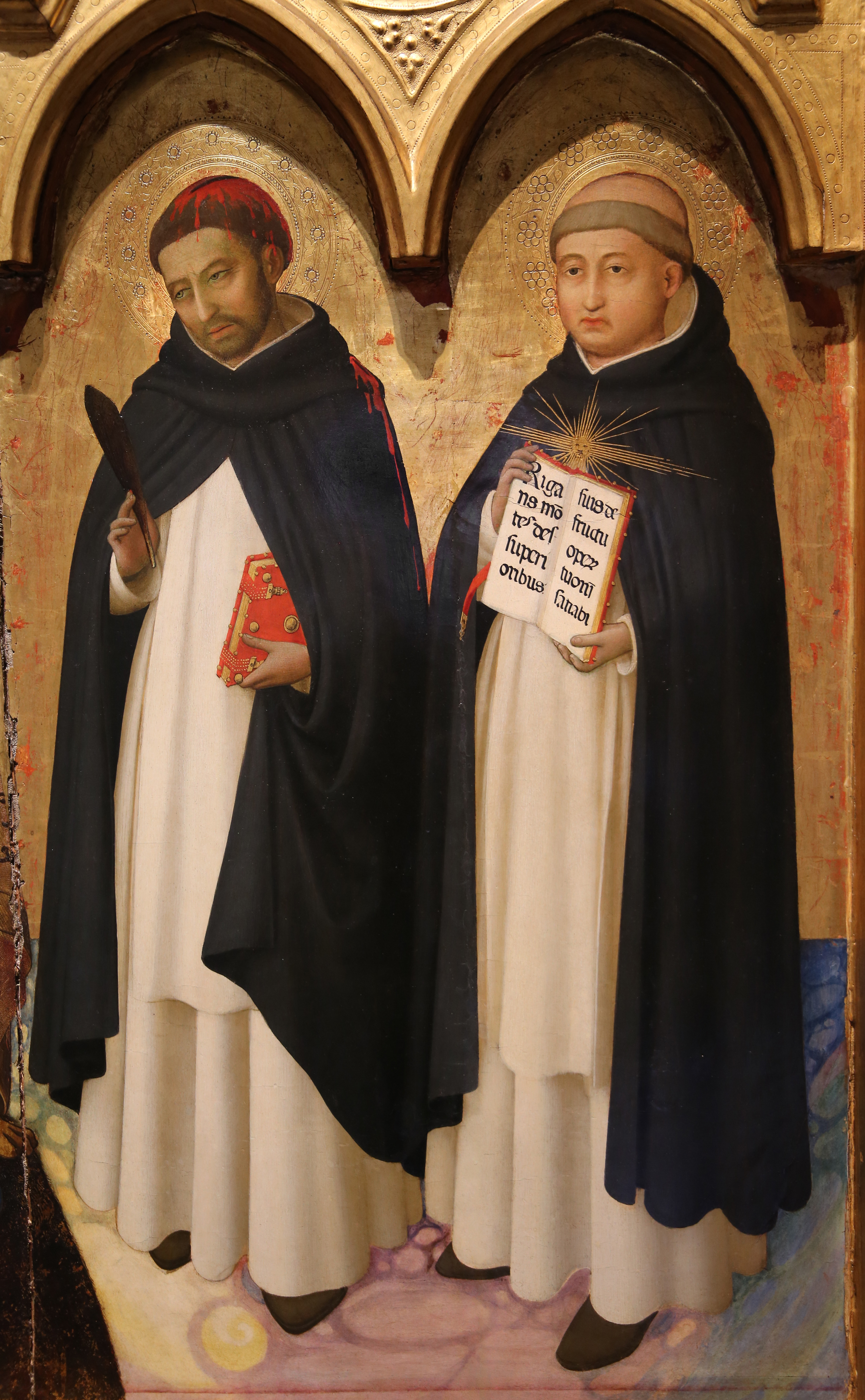
Saint Thomas Aquinas holding a copy of Rigans montes at the San Pietro Martire Triptych (c. 1428), by Fra Angelico.

Rigans montes (lit. 'Watering the mountains') is an exegetical speech regarding Psalm 104:13 pronounced by Thomas Aquinas on the occasion of his designation as Magister Sacrae Paginae in 1256. It is one of the two sermons that compose the Principia, a late-discovered work which also includes Hic est liber.

== Context and structure ==
Rigans montes was presented by Aquinas as his inauguration address as a Magister Sacrae Paginae, sometime between April and May 1256. The speech follows the author's recurrent emphasis regarding the importance of teachers for the instruction of the faithful in religious matters.

According to a legend, Aquinas chose to comment on Psalm 104:13 after a fervent prayer followed by a dream in which a Dominican friar, presumably Saint Dominic, told him to do so. His is the only extant principium based on that verse. As told by Bernard Gui:

He seemed to see an old man, white haired and clothed in the Dominican habit, who came and said to him: "Brother Thomas, why are you praying and weeping?" "Because," answered Thomas, "they are making me take the degree of master, and I do not think I am fully competent. Moreover, I cannot think what theme to take for my inaugural lecture." To this the old man replied: "do not fear: God will help you to bear the burden of being a master. And as for the lecture, take this text, "Thou waterst the hills from thy upper rooms: the earth shall be filled with the fruit of thy works" [Rigans montes de superioribus suis de fructu operum tuorum satiabitur terra]. Then he vanished, and Thomas awoke and thanked God for having so quickly come to his aid.

Such story was also attested under oath during Thomas's process of canonization by Peter of Montesangiovanni, a Cistercian from the monastery of Fossanova in which Aquinas died, who affirmed that the saint had told it to the local prior at request of Reginald of Piperno. Peter of Caputio, who also witnessed to the process, mentioned having heard the story at the priory of Saint-Jacques, and that the friars in Paris had generally identified the old man as Saint Dominic, even if Aquinas had never explicitly done so. Jean-Pierre Torrell stated that "historians have every reason to believe that we have here a personal confidence that goes back to Thomas himself".

Rigans montes broadly follows the "sermo modernus" structure, a preaching style based on taking a biblical verse as a "thema", dividing it in three or four parts, and developing thoroughly on each. Despite not exceeding 1,645 words, the speech quotes the Bible at least forty times. As a principium in aula, it was required in the University's documents to be "a commendation of Scripture and a comparison of Scripture to other fields of study".

The Principia were only republished in 1912, what has caused a significative lack of attention and bibliography on such works. Gordon states that some scholars may have seen in them just academic exercises with little to no value for Thomistic studies, and thought both would not represent the doctor's dominant exegetical theory.

== Doctrine ==
The work develops as a commentary on Psalm 104:13, which reads in Latin: Rigans montes de superioribus suis de fructu operum tuorum satiabitur terra (lit. 'As you water the hills from your heights, the earth shall be furnished abundantly with the fruit of your works'). Aquinas's main point, derived from the teachings of Pseudo-Dionysius the Areopagite, is that, through the determination of the divine providence, all spiritual and corporal higher gifts "descend from the highest realm to the lowest by way of intermediaries". As Ellul sums up:

Just as the rains flow from above, water mountains and form rivers that flow and fertilize the land, so spiritual wisdom flows from God to the minds of listeners through the mediation of teachers. The latter should be detached from worldly matters and be elevated in their lives so as to enlighten the faithful by their teaching. The power of communication, however, belongs properly to God whereas teachers participate in this as ministers and servants of divine wisdom. The listeners, on the other hand, should be humble in receiving sacred doctrine, firm in discriminating right from wrong, and fruitful so as to propagate as many words of wisdom as possible from the few that they have heard.

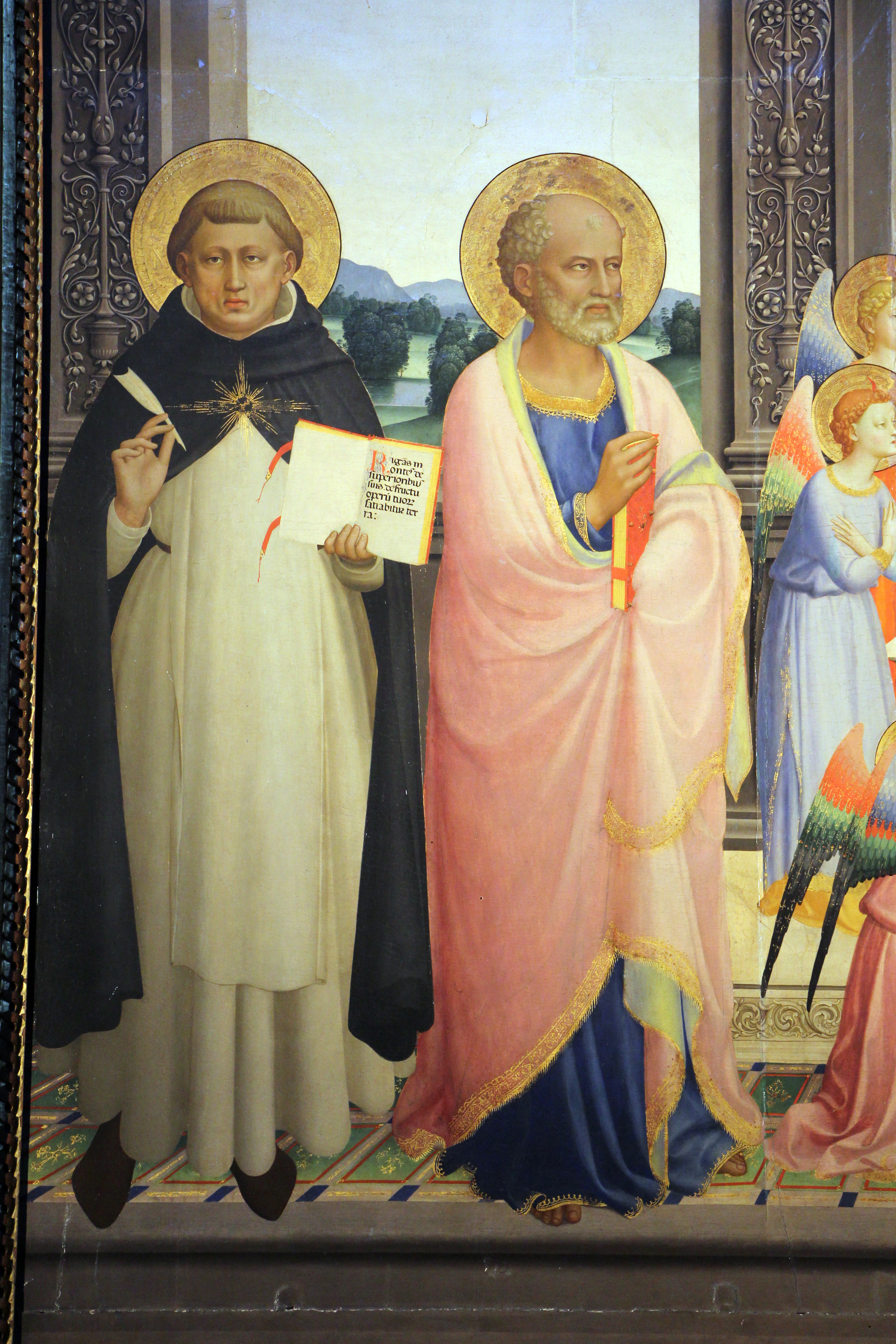
Detail of the Fiesole Altarpiece (c. 1424), by Fra Angelico. Aquinas is depicted with Rigans montes in his left hand.

Aquinas analyzes the dissemination of the divine truth in light of four considerations, namely "the height of spiritual doctrine; the dignity of those who teach it; the condition of the listeners; and the order of communicating". Its height would derive from "its origin in God, the subtlety of its content, and the sublimity of its end", which is the participation in eternal life. From this sublimity it is deduced a special dignity held by its teachers, a motive of rejoice for them, but which demands them to "renounce selfish pursuits, remain open to and receptive of divine splendor, and be ready to defend the faith against heresies". Aquinas quotes Titus 1:9 to highlight the "three responsibilities" of teaching, disputing and preaching, assumed in the statutes of the University of Paris and first formulated by Petrus Cantor.

Thomas considers all wisdom to be more or less perfect shares of divine wisdom, and therefore describes common knowledge of God as a participation in such quality. Aquinas quotes John Damascene in affirming that "the knowledge of the existence of God is naturally placed in everyone": this has led to various interpretations, as a wide number of texts by the author seem to support different views on the subject.

Regarding the role of those who receive the teachings, the author asks them to follow the lowliness of the watered earth, as "humility is required of them with respect to the learning that comes from listening [...] Rectitude of the senses with respect to the judgment of what is heard [...] But fruitfulness in discovery, by which from a few things heard, the good listener pronounces many things". The saint finished his exposition by studying the communication of sacred doctrine. The upper places are presented as a symbol of the unreachable wisdom which teachers are unable to achieve, a conscience that should make them cautious in teaching only what they know. The process of dissemination is described as hierarchical: only God possesses wisdom intrinsically and naturally, teachers participate in it abundantly, and students do so sufficiently. This is followed by a distinction between God's direct communication of wisdom and the secondary communication carried out by teachers, which do not perform it save as ministers, and therefore cannot attribute to themselves the fruits of their activity. Thomas finishes by stating that no one would be naturally sufficient to be a minister of the divine wisdom, and after quoting James 1:5, he concludes with a "Let us pray that Christ may grant it to us, Amen."

These teachings are to be understood as part of the broader Thomistic philosophy of education. Smith poses, as a consequence of this doctrine, that

Masters are called, like St. Paul, to "pass on what they themselves received" (1 Corinthians 15:3), not to imagine that they are supposed to set forth their own doctrines or pretend to possess their own wisdom. What this role as an intermediary, not an ultimate source, of divine wisdom requires of them is that they live the noblest form of life, freeing themselves from all their "base" desires for status and prestige, as did Christ, the teacher who was both one with God, and yet emptied himself of His divinity to take on our humanity.

The role of teachers in Rigans montes is "one aspect of the more general and extremely important question of whether secondary causes of any kind exercise any authentic causality". Aquinas would argue against Avicenna's approach to learning, according to which "intelligible forms flow into our mind from the agent intelligence" without any serious role for the teacher besides preparing the student for that, and against the Platonic anamnesis theory, as both would reduce the role of secondary causes and therefore go against the glory of Creation. Thomas teaches a true causal interaction between teachers and students, as the former may serve as cooperators of God according to their nature and their students'.

== See also ==
- Economy of Salvation
- Great chain of being
- Hierarchy of the Catholic Church
- Homiletics

== Bibliography ==
- Brock, Stephen L. (2002-09-30). "Can Atheism be Rational? A Reading of Thomas Aquinas". Acta Philosophica. 11 (2): 215–238. doi:10.17421/1121_2179_2002_11_02_Brock. ISSN 1825-6562.
- Ellul, Joseph (2015-12-04). "Religious discourse and Philosophy Ibn Rusd and Thomas Aquinas". Poznańskie Studia Teologiczne (29): 27–53. doi:10.14746/pst.2015.29.3. ISSN 0209-3472.
- Gordon, Joseph K. (2016). "St. Thomas Aquinas "Rightly Dividing the Word of Truth": The Historical and Theological Contours of Thomas's Principia". Nova et Vetera. 14 (1): 245–270. doi:10.1353/nov.2016.0001. ISSN 2470-5861.
- Smith, Randall B. (2018). "Thomas Aquinas' Principium at Paris". In Roszak, Piotr; Vijgen, Jörgen (eds.). Towards A Biblical Thomism: Thomas Aquinas and the Renewal of Biblical Theology (1st ed.). Pamplona: EUNSA. pp. 39–60. ISBN 978-8431332860.
