= Jessica Lee Morgan =

British singer and songwriter (born 1976)

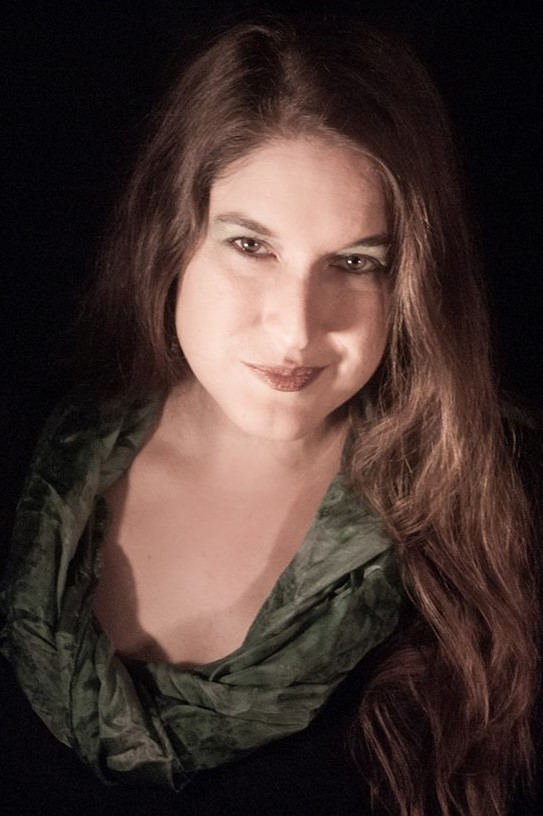

Background information
- Born: 16 June 1976 (age 50)
- Origin: Reading, Berkshire, England
- Genres: Folk
- Instruments: Vocals; guitar
- Years active: 2010–present

Jessica Lee Morgan (born 16 June 1976) is a British singer and songwriter.

== Early life ==
As the daughter of Welsh folksinger Mary Hopkin and American music producer Tony Visconti, Morgan grew up in a musical environment. She learned songs on guitar from her mother and musician friends of the family and was influenced by singer-songwriters such as Joni Mitchell.

Morgan continued to sing in concerts and sessions. One of her earliest sessions was for Hazel O'Connor and later for Elaine Paige as "Jessica Visconti", both produced by her father, Tony Visconti.

At university she played solo original gigs and in covers bands, and also put on gigs for other bands.

== Career ==
In 2010, Morgan released her debut album, I Am Not. The same year, she sang on several tracks on the album You Look Familiar" by her mother Mary Hopkin and her brother Morgan Visconti.

In 2011, Morgan recorded "The Long and Winding Road" for The Beatles Complete on Ukulele. In 2014, she sang on Morgan Visconti's album Ride and performed live at the launch event in May in New York City. Morgan and her brother had previously collaborated on her album I Am Not, which her brother co-produced.

Later in 2014, Morgan took part in the "Dylathon", a 36-hour performance of the works of Dylan Thomas at the Swansea Grand Theatre to celebrate the poet's centenary directed by Michael Bogdanov. She performed her own a cappella musical adaptation of "Love in the Asylum" and two excerpts from "Under Milk Wood" as Polly Garter with the Wales Theatre Company and Ian McKellen.

On Saint David's Day 2015, Morgan represented her mother at Wales at Number One, a concert at the Wales Millennium Centre in Cardiff. She sang "Those Were the Days". The same year, she released her singles "Painting By Numbers" and "When Did It All Begin?"

Her second album, Around the Block, was released on 16 June 2017.

Re:Boot was a reworking of her first album and was released in 2018. In 2020 her fourth album, Forthright, was released in June.

She sang two songs as a guest on the album Decades by David Palfreyman and Nicholas Pegg, appearing in a video for one of the songs, "Hurting, Sinking", which was released on 1 December 2017.

She currently performs solo and with her partner in the UK. In 2020, unable to perform live due to restrictions following the coronavirus outbreak, she started live-streaming gigs as part of a Time Zone Tour.

In May 2023, Morgan released the album Two Hearts alongside her mother.

Two years later, she released her sixth album, You Know What You Should Do?, on 21 March 2025.

== Other projects ==
In 2005, Morgan founded Mary Hopkin Music, a record label, exclusively for the distribution of previously unreleased material by Hopkin. The label has released several albums including You Look Familiar and Morgan's cover of "Painting by Numbers".

In 2015 Morgan toured with a show called Very Hopkin, singing Mary Hopkin covers as a tribute to her mother. She has also toured her own material as a support act and performing backing vocals, twelve-string guitar and saxophone with the band Holy Holy, featuring Woody Woodmansey, Visconti, and Glenn Gregory.

In 2025, Jessica wrote a book about her experiences in the music industry and giving advice to others who are starting out. It shares the title of her album released at the same time, You Know What You Should Do?

Jessica is also an Alexander Technique teacher and teaches in-person and online.
