= Paladin (band) =

British progressive rock band

- Origin: England
- Genres: Progressive rock
- Years active: 1970–1973
- Labels: Bronze

Paladin was a British progressive rock band which released two albums on the Bronze Records label. Band members included Peter Solley (organ, leslie violin, grand piano), Keith Webb (drums, percussion), Peter Beckett (bass guitar, vocals), Derek Foley (lead guitar, slide guitar, vocals) and Lou Stonebridge (vocals, electric piano, harmonica).

== Career ==
The band were founded in 1970 by classically trained multi-instrumentalist Peter Solley and jazz drummer Keith Webb, two members of Terry Reid's band who were part of the opening act for the Rolling Stones on their 1969 American tour. The other members of the band were Derek Foley (guitar and vocals) who previously played in Grisby Dyke; Lou Stonebridge (keyboards and vocals) from Glass Menagerie, which had released five progressive rock and psychedelic rock singles, and also the lead singer of Grisby Dyke; and Peter Beckett (bass guitar, vocals) who came from Liverpool-based Winston G and the Wicked, and later in the final incarnation of World of Oz.

They played in venues across the UK as they worked to develop their sound, performing a mix of rock, blues, soul, jazz, and Latin music. Paladin's use of dual keyboards also created a unique sound. These performances were noticed by Bronze Records (who also recorded Uriah Heep and Manfred Mann). On January 8, 1971, Paladin entered Olympic Studios in London to record their debut eponymous first album, produced by Philamore Lincoln. The reviews were good, but the sales were disappointing.

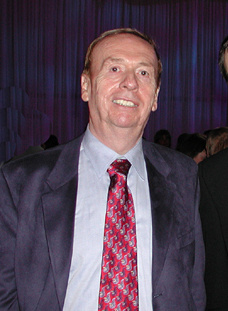
Geoff Emerick, engineer for the Beatles' Sgt. Pepper album, was the producer of Paladin's Charge! in 1972.

Despite the poor performance of Paladin, the band was allowed to record a second album, Charge! produced by Philamore Lincoln, engineered by Geoff Emerick at Apple Studios and released in 1972. The album is notable for the cover art by Roger Dean which unfortunately did not help sales. In 1972, Stonebridge and Foley left, and the band recruited guitar/vocalist Joe Jammer to replace them. The group finally disbanded near the end of 1972.

Peter Solley would later play in a variety of bands and acted as a producer. He played with Eric Clapton, Whitesnake and Procol Harum, playing keyboards opposite Gary Brooker, and did production work for Peter Frampton and Wreckless Eric. Keith Webb ran the Nag's Head, Stafford, where he hosted numerous famous and no-longer-so-famous Rock'n'Roll acts including Climax Band and Mark Knopfler's Dire Straits during the "Sultans of Swing" era. Keith had played with several big names and bands and every Friday night in the late '70s he jammed at Rock Workshop, Etruria; he ended up in Spain. Lou Stonebridge went to McGuinness Flint and later to David Byron (ex-Uriah Heep). Peter Beckett moved to the United States, founding Player and scoring a No. 1 hit called "Baby Come Back", co-written with J.C. Crowley, and later touring with the Little River Band. Derek Foley went on to play with Graham Bond.

The band recorded several jazz tracks which were finally released as Jazzatack in 2002.

== Discography ==
- Paladin (1971)
- Charge! (1972)
- Jazzattack (2002)
