= William Lovelady =

Classical guitarist and composer

- Born: 1945 (age 80–81)
- Occupations: Guitarist; Composer
- Known for: Compositions for guitar; Cantata on Psalm 104 commissioned by the Duke of Edinburgh
- Website: Official website

William Lovelady (born 1945) is an English guitarist and composer who has also performed and published as Bill Lovelady.

His London Rhapsody for guitar was published by Schott. His music has been aired frequently by BBC Radio 3 and Classic FM. He has collaborated with Art Garfunkel, South African trumpeter Hugh Masekela, L. Shankar and Julian Lloyd Webber. As Bill Lovelady, he scored major success first in the UK, with the 1979 song "Reggae for it now", a Top 20 hit produced by Eric Dufaure, and later the same year in Sweden and Norway, particularly with the song "One More Reggae for the Road".

Three of his compositions for guitar, Incantations No. 5 to 7, were included in a recording titled Guitar Meditation played by Craig Ogden and released in 1999. A reviewer compared their "eccentric charm" to music by Erik Satie. Four of his Incantations were included in a 2013 collection titled Incandescent by guitarist Alison Smith. A reviewer noted his eclectic musical style. Smith recorded three of his works, Edie Suite, Curlew and White Stone and Dreams of a Russian Summer in 2019, combined with music by Chopin, Agustín Barrios Mangoré and others.

His commissions include a cantata setting of Psalm 104, which was commissioned by Prince Philip, Duke of Edinburgh for his 75th birthday. The psalm text was adapted for a cantata in three movements by Sarn Dyer (b. 1945), beginning "My soul give praise unto the Lord of Heaven". An abridged version, arranged for choir and organ by James Vivian, director of music at St George's Chapel, with permission from the composer, was performed at the Duke's funeral service at St George's Chapel on 17 April 2021, performed by four singers and chapel organist Luke Bond, conducted by Vivian.

== See also ==
- Oasis (1980s band)
