= Mary Hopkin =

Welsh singer (born 1950)

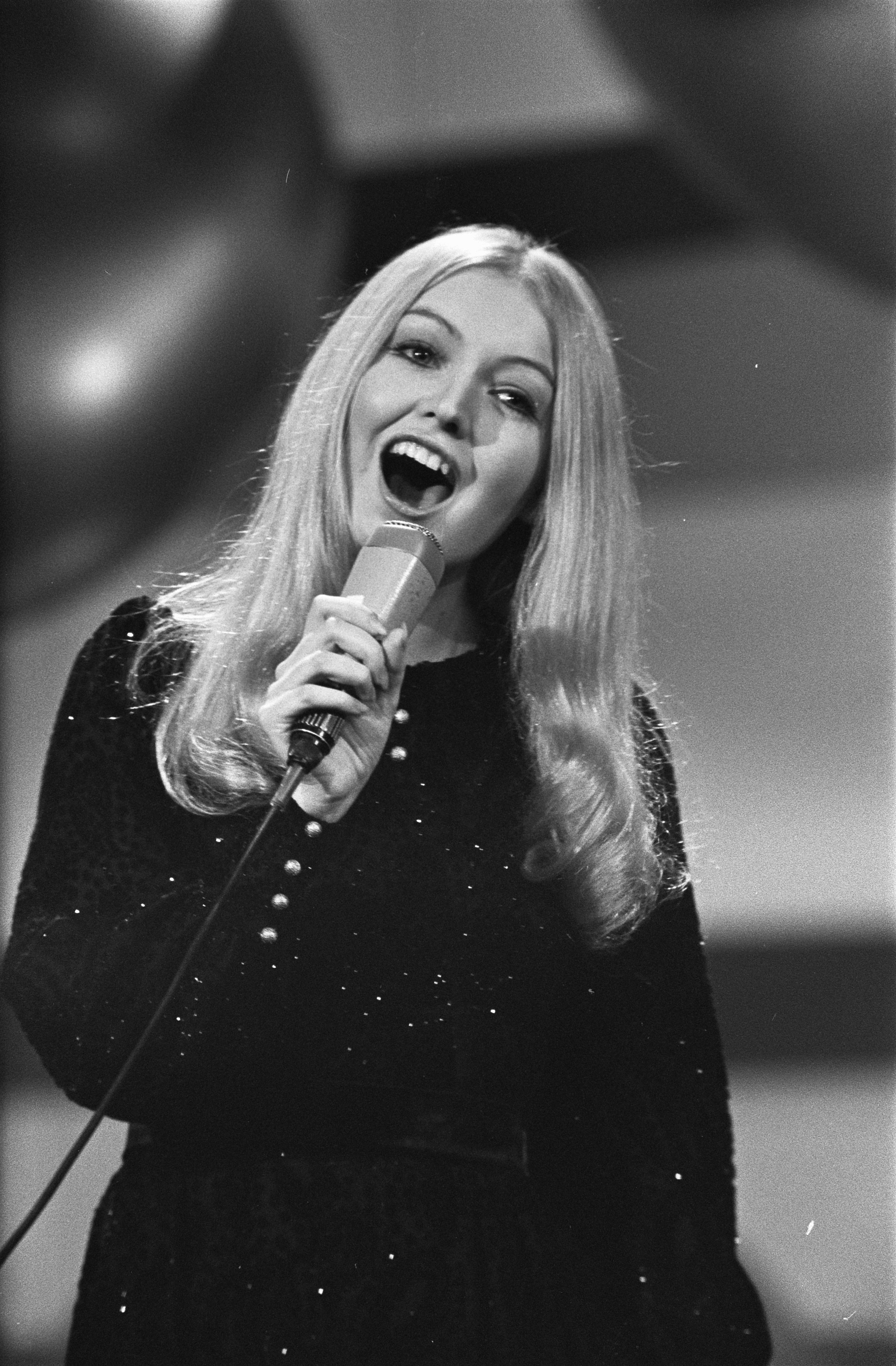
- Hopkin at the Eurovision Song Contest 1970

Background information
- Born: Mary Elizabeth Blodwen Hopkin; 3 May 1950 (age 76); Pontardawe, Wales
- Genre: Folk-pop
- Occupations: Singer; songwriter
- Instruments: Vocals; guitar
- Years active: 1968–present
- Labels: Apple; Manticore; Clan; Nationwide; Numero Uno; Mary Hopkin Music
- Spouse: Tony Visconti (m. 1971; div. 1981)
- Website: maryhopkin.com

Mary Elizabeth Blodwen Hopkin (born 3 May 1950), credited on some recordings as Mary Visconti from her marriage to Tony Visconti, is a Welsh singer best known for her 1968 UK number one single "Those Were the Days". She was one of the first artists to be signed to the Beatles' Apple label.

== Life and career ==
=== Early life and singing career ===
Mary Elizabeth Blodwen Hopkin was born into a Welsh-speaking family in Pontardawe, Wales. She took weekly singing lessons as a child and began her musical career as a folk singer with a local group called the Selby Set and Mary. She released an EP of Welsh-language songs for a local record label called Cambrian, based in her hometown, before signing with Apple Records, owned by the Beatles, one of the first artists to do so. The model Twiggy saw her winning the ITV television talent show Opportunity Knocks and recommended her to Paul McCartney.

Hopkin's debut single, "Those Were the Days", produced by McCartney, was released in the UK on 30 August 1968. Despite competition from well-established star Sandie Shaw, whose own single version of the song was also released that year, Hopkin's version became a number one hit on the UK singles chart. It reached number two on the US Billboard Hot 100, where for three weeks it was held out of the top spot by the Beatles' "Hey Jude", and spent two weeks at number one on Canada's RPM singles chart. It sold over 1.5 million copies in the United States alone, and was awarded a gold disc by the RIAA. Global sales topped 8 million. Hopkin's recording of "Those Were The Days" was nominated for the "Best Contemporary Pop Vocal Performance, Female" at the 11th Annual Grammy Awards in March 1969.

On 2 October 1968, Hopkin appeared at St Paul's Cathedral in London for the Pop Experience, where she sang "Morning of My Life", "Turn Turn Turn", and "Plaisir d'amour". In December that year, the NME music magazine reported that Hopkin was considering a lead acting role in Stanley Baker's planned film Rape of the Fair Country, which was to be based on Alexander Cordell's book of the same name. That particular project did not materialise, but Hopkin did sing the title songs of two of Baker's films, Where's Jack? and Kidnapped.

On 21 February 1969, Hopkin's debut album, Post Card, again produced by McCartney, was released. It included covers of three songs from Donovan, who also played on the album, and one song each from George Martin and Harry Nilsson. It reached number three on the UK Albums Chart, although it proved to be her solitary success in that chart. In the United States, Post Card reached number 28 on the Billboard albums chart.

The next single was "Goodbye", written by McCartney (credited to Lennon–McCartney), and released on 26 March 1969. It reached number two on the UK singles chart, number 13 on the Billboard Hot 100 and number 15 on the RPM chart in Canada. Hopkin said she interpreted "Goodbye" as McCartney pledging to stop micromanaging her career, since she was uncomfortable with his positioning of her as a pop chanteuse. She also expressed dissatisfaction with her manager at this time, Terry Doran.

Hopkin's third single, "Temma Harbour", was a re-arrangement of a Philamore Lincoln song. Her first single not to be produced by McCartney, it was released on 16 January 1970 and peaked at number six in the UK and number 42 in Canada. In the US, "Temma Harbour" reached number 39 on the Billboard Hot 100 and number four on the magazine's Easy Listening chart. Along with Donovan and Billy Preston, Hopkin was one of the chorus singers on the Radha Krishna Temple's 1970 hit single "Govinda", produced by George Harrison for Apple Records.

=== Eurovision ===
In March 1970, Hopkin represented the United Kingdom in the Eurovision Song Contest 1970, achieving second place with "Knock, Knock Who's There?" Despite being the pre-contest favourite, Hopkin lost to "All Kinds of Everything", performed by Irish singer Dana. Produced by Mickie Most, "Knock, Knock Who's There?" was released as a single on 23 March 1970 and peaked at number two in the UK. It was a worldwide hit, selling over a million.

Hopkin's final big hit was "Think About Your Children", released in October 1970, which reached number 19 in the UK. Hopkin expressed dissatisfaction with the material produced by Most, who had taken over as her producer with "Temma Harbour". After appearing in Eurovision, Hopkin wanted to return to her folk-music roots.

=== After Eurovision ===
At McCartney's insistence, Hopkin had recorded a cover of "Que Sera, Sera" in August 1969. Hopkin had no wish to record the song and refused to have the single released in Britain. Originally issued in France in September 1969, it was released in North America in June 1970. The single peaked at number 77 on the Billboard Hot 100.

The last single to hit the British charts was "Let My Name Be Sorrow", which reached number 46 in July 1971. It was produced by Tony Visconti, whom Hopkin had met earlier for a Welsh recording of "Sparrow". "Let My Name Be Sorrow" was a hit in Poland in January 1972.

Hopkin's second album, Earth Song/Ocean Song, was released by Apple on 1 October 1971. The album was produced by Visconti and included cover versions of songs written by Cat Stevens, Gallagher and Lyle, and Ralph McTell, as well as the two title tracks by Liz Thorsen. Hopkin felt it was the album she had always wanted to make, so, coinciding with her marriage to Visconti and with little left to prove, she left the music scene. The album's single, "Water, Paper, and Clay", missed the Billboard Hot 100. It was Hopkin's last single for Apple Records, which she left in March 1972.

After Hopkin's departure from Apple, a compilation album titled Those Were the Days was released in the latter part of 1972. The album featured all of Hopkin's hits but failed to chart. "Knock Knock, Who's There?" was released as a single in the United States and Canada, both countries having been excluded from the first release of that record in 1970. The single reached number 92 on the Billboard Hot 100 and number 11 on the Easy Listening chart in December 1972, giving Hopkin her last US hit.

=== Television series ===
Following her appearance in the Eurovision contest, Hopkin had her own peak time TV series, Mary Hopkin in the Land of ..., on BBC1. Created by Eric Merriman, each episode featured Hopkin looking at a different aspect of storytelling through music and dance. The six 30-minute programmes were broadcast in 1970 and were repeated in 1971.

=== After the hit singles ===
After marrying Visconti in 1971, Hopkin withdrew from the pop-music scene to have a family. Although reportedly unhappy with show business, she did not stop recording. She travelled to Australia with Visconti in January 1972 and performed at a large outdoor rock festival in South Australia, in addition to giving concerts in several major cities. In March, Hopkin announced her departure from Apple Records; her manager, Jo Lustig, said they were considering offers from "three major [record] companies". In June, the single "Summertime Summertime" / "Sweet and Low" was released on Bell Records under the name of Hobby Horse. The A-side was a cover of a 1958 song by the Jamies. With Visconti's assistance, she released the 1972 Christmas single "Mary Had a Baby" / "Cherry Tree Carol" on Regal Zonophone Records.

Hopkin starred in her own one-off TV special for BBC1 on 29 July 1972. Titled Sing Hi, Sing Lo, it was billed simply as "light entertainment starring Mary Hopkin".

Although no other singles or albums were released under her name until 1976, she sang on numerous recordings that her husband produced, such as those featuring Tom Paxton, Ralph McTell, David Bowie (Low), Bert Jansch, the Radiators from Space, Thin Lizzy, Carmen, the Sarstedt Brothers, Osibisa, Sparks, Hazel O'Connor, and Elaine Paige. On all of these recordings (and also on her husband's own Inventory album) she is credited as Mary Visconti. During this time, she also appeared on various TV shows, such as Cilla Black's, as well as various radio programmes.

=== Return to recording ===
In 1976, she returned to recording under her birth name and released the single "If You Love Me (Really Love Me)" (originally recorded by Édith Piaf as "Hymne à l'amour"), which reached number 32 in the UK chart. The B-side, "Tell Me Now", was an original composition by Hopkin. Her next single was "Wrap Me in Your Arms", with the B-side again written by Hopkin ("Just A Dreamer"). These singles came out on Visconti's Good Earth Records label. Several songs recorded for an album at the time have now been released under Hopkin's own label, Mary Hopkin Music.

Two members of Steeleye Span (Bob Johnson and Pete Knight) chose Hopkin to play "Princess Lirazel" on their concept album The King of Elfland's Daughter. She also appeared at the Cambridge Folk Festival with Bert Jansch. In 1976, her second child was born. Before the 1970s ended, Decca released a compilation album of Hopkin's Cambrian recordings, The Welsh World of Mary Hopkin.

=== 1980s ===
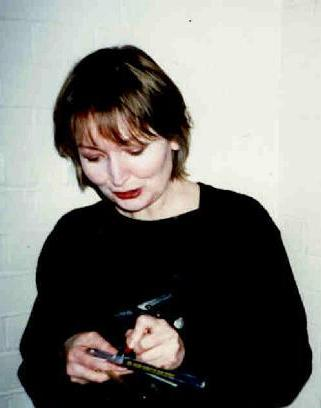
Hopkin in 1982

Hopkin's first project in the 1980s was a well-reviewed stint playing the Virgin Mary in Rock Nativity at the Hexagon Theatre in Reading, Berkshire. After this, Mike Hurst (record producer and formerly of the Springfields) asked her to sing lead in a new group named Sundance that he had formed with Mike de Albuquerque of ELO. Their only single, "What's Love", allowed them to tour the UK with Dr. Hook but Hopkin quickly left the group, dissatisfied with the gigs. "What's Love" proved very popular in South Africa, albeit the only territory where it charted, peaking at number 10 in April 1982. In 2002, Hurst released recordings from this time on the Angel Air label.

Hopkin and Visconti divorced in 1981. The following year she provided vocals on "Rachael's Song" for the Vangelis soundtrack of Blade Runner. Around 1984, Peter Skellern asked her to join him and Julian Lloyd Webber in a group called Oasis. Their self-titled and only album, Oasis, was released on WEA along with two singles. The album reached number 23 on the UK album chart in 1984 and remained there for 14 weeks. A tour of the UK was planned but was brought to an abrupt end because Hopkin became ill. The group disbanded shortly afterwards.

During the 1980s, Hopkin appeared in several charity shows, including an appearance at the London Palladium with Ralph McTell. In 1988, she took part in George Martin's production of Dylan Thomas' Under Milk Wood. She played the character Rosie Probert and performed a piece called "Love Duet" with Freddie Jones as Captain Cat. The making of the record was filmed and made into a special edition of The South Bank Show, where Hopkin and Jones were shown rehearsing and recording "Love Duet". In 1992, the cast reunited for a performance of the play as a tribute to Thomas in the presence of Prince Charles for The Prince's Trust.

In 1985 Hopkin sang lead vocals on 3 songs ( " Where You Are ", " Shame on You, " & " Forever " ) from Cerrone: " The Collector " album.

Hopkin recorded an album called Spirit in 1989. This was released on the Trax Music label and is a collection of light classical songs and featured the single "Ave Maria". The record was produced by Benny Gallagher, of Gallagher and Lyle, who had contributed songs to her during her days at Apple Records.

=== 1990s ===
Early in 1990, Hopkin sang with the Chieftains at the London Palladium in a charity show and later joined them on a tour of the UK.

She continued to do projects of her choosing, working with people such as Julian Colbeck; she wrote the lyrics and performed a song on his CD Back to Bach. Also, there was Marc Cerrone's The Collector, a stage play/opera for which she performed two songs on the CD and video. She worked again with the guitarist Brian Willoughby and Dave Cousins (of Strawbs) on their CD The Bridge. She also appeared on a Beatles' tribute album by RAM Pietsch.

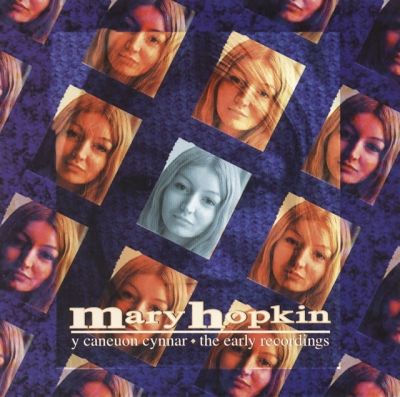
Album cover of Y Caneuon Cynnar – The Early Recordings

In 1996, the Welsh label Sain bought Cambrian's back catalogue and released all of Hopkin's Welsh recordings on a CD called Y Caneuon Cynnar/The Early Recordings, which removed the overdubbed drums found on the Decca recordings.

In 1999, she again joined the Chieftains on their UK tour and, later that year, performed concerts in Scotland with Benny Gallagher and Jim Diamond. There were also three TV documentaries about her, one each for HTV (1998), BBC Television (1998) and S4C (2000).

She made a guest appearance on the Crocketts' album The Great Brain Robbery, sang the theme song for Billy Connolly's BBC TV series World Tour of England, Ireland and Wales and re-recorded "Those Were The Days" with Robin Williams rapping. She also appeared in the Sara Sugarman film Very Annie Mary.

=== 2000s ===
In September 2005, she released a retrospective album on the Mary Hopkin Music a label run by her daughter entitled Live at the Royal Festival Hall 1972. It was followed in December 2006 by a Christmas recording, "Snowed Under", released on download only.

To celebrate her 57th birthday in 2007, she released an album called Valentine on her new eponymous label. It included 12 previously unheard tracks dating from 1972 to 1980, three of which were written by Hopkin. In 2008, a new album, Recollections, was released on her own label. It included 11 tracks that were originally recorded between 1970 and 1986, alongside a CD of three Christmas songs which included "Mary Had a Baby" and "The Cherry-Tree Carol" (these tracks were first released on Regal Zonophone in 1972) and "Snowed Under", which was released in 2006 as a download only.

Her final archival CD, Now and Then, was released in May 2009. It comprises 14 tracks recorded between 1970 and 1988. She sang the song "Y 'deryn pur" ("Gentle Bird") on the album Blodeugerdd: Song of the Flowers – An Anthology of Welsh Music and Song released by Smithsonian Folkways Recordings in June 2009.

=== 2010s ===
Hopkin's daughter, Jessica Lee Morgan, released her first CD, called I Am Not, on which Hopkin sings on several songs.

In October 2010, Hopkin and her son, Morgan Visconti, released You Look Familiar, a collaboration which brings together Hopkin's melodies, lyrics and vocals with her son's instrumentation and arrangements.

In 2013, Painting by Numbers was released on Mary Hopkin Music. The album includes 10 tracks written by Hopkin, two of which are co-written with friends; "Love Belongs Right Here" with Brian Willoughby and "Love, Long Distance" with Benny Gallagher.

For Christmas 2014, Hopkin recorded a single with her son and daughter. The traditional carol, "Iesu Faban" (meaning "Baby Jesus" in Welsh), was described on her website as a "close, intimate choral performance of a traditional Welsh Christmas carol".

To celebrate the 50th anniversary of the release of "Those Were the Days", on 30 August 2018 Hopkin released a new acoustic version, on an EP also featuring the live version from her 1972 "farewell" concert at the Royal Festival Hall. Also included on that album are a 1977 version of "Goodbye" (produced by her then husband, Tony Visconti) and a 2018 version of "Those Were the Days", which she recorded with her daughter (Jessica Lee Morgan) and her son (Morgan Visconti) to celebrate that anniversary.

=== 2020s ===
Hopkin released an album called Two Hearts with her daughter Jessica Lee Morgan. Featuring newly written material and covers from the Bangles to Dire Straits, it was released on 3 May 2023, Hopkin's 73rd birthday.

== Discography ==
- Post Card (1969)
- Earth Song/Ocean Song (1971)
- Spirit (1989)
- Valentine (2007)
- Recollections (2008)
- Now and Then (2009)
- You Look Familiar (2010), with Morgan Visconti
- Painting by Numbers (2013)
- Another Road (2020)
- A Christmas Chorale (2020)
- Pieces (2022)
- Two Hearts (2023) with her daughter Jessica Lee Morgan

== See also ==
- Apple Records discography
- Chime Rinpoche

Preceded by Lulu with "Boom Bang-a-Bang"	UK in the Eurovision Song Contest; 1970	Succeeded by Clodagh Rodgers with "Jack in the Box"
