= Two Hearts (Mary Hopkin and Jessica Lee Morgan album) =

Studio album by Mary Hopkin, Jessica Lee Morgan
- Released: 3 May 2023
- Recorded: London, Wales
- Genre: Rock; folk
- Label: Mary Hopkin Music

Singles from Mary Hopkin
- 1. "You've Got Everything" Released: 2023

Two Hearts is a studio album by the Welsh singer Mary Hopkin and her daughter Jessica Lee Morgan. It was released on Mary Hopkin Music on 3 May 2023 in the UK.

== Singles ==
You've Got Everything was the first single released from the album and was played on BBC Radio Wales and BBC Radio 6 Music. A music video was later released for Sail With Me.

== Track listing ==
All tracks written by Mary Hopkin and Jessica Lee Morgan, except where noted.

No.	Title	Writer(s)	Length
1.	"Tomorrow"
2.	"Why Worry"	Mark Knopfler
3.	"The Less Said The Better"
4.	"Where Do You Go?"
5.	"Far Away"
6.	"Eternal Flame"	Susanna Hoffs, Tom Kelly, Billy Steinberg
7.	"Here it All Comes Again"
8.	"Sail With Me"
9.	"My Town"	Anna McGarrigle
10.	"You've Got Everything"
11.	"Two Hearts, Broken"

== Personnel ==
- Mary Hopkin – lead vocals, background vocals, guitar, writer
- Jessica Lee Morgan – lead vocals, background vocals, writer
- Morgan Visconti – electric guitar
- Christian Thomas – production, engineer, additional guitar and bass
