= Post Card (album) =

1969 album by Mary Hopkin

Studio album by Mary Hopkin
- Released: 21 February 1969
- Recorded: October–December 1968
- Studios: EMI, London; Trident, London; Morgan, London
- Genres: Rock; folk; pop
- Length: 41:34
- Label: Apple
- Producer: Paul McCartney

Mary Hopkin chronology
Post Card (1969)	Earth Song/Ocean Song (1971)

Singles from Post Card
- 1. "Those Were the Days" Released: 30 August 1968

Post Card is the debut album by the Welsh singer Mary Hopkin. It was produced by Paul McCartney and released by Apple Records in February 1969 in the UK and in March 1969 in the US. It reached number 3 in the UK and number 28 in the US.

== Background and recording ==
In 1968, Hopkin performed on the British television talent show Opportunity Knocks. Her performance was watched by Twiggy, who mentioned to Paul McCartney about signing her when he talked about the new record label the Beatles had founded. After receiving a telegram, saying to ring Peter Brown at Apple Records, Hopkin, not having heard of either of them, initially did not until her mother insisted several days later. When she rang, she was put through to McCartney, who invited her to come to London to sign a contract. However, Hopkin did not recognise that it was McCartney and at first was hesitant, until he told her to ask her mother, who almost dropped the telephone when McCartney added who he was. After signing with Apple, McCartney suggested a song he had found several years prior called "Those Were the Days" that might suit Hopkin. It was recorded in July 1968, released the following month, and went on to thrust Hopkin into the limelight, topping the charts in the UK and worldwide.

Following the success of "Those Were the Days", Hopkin and McCartney set about working on her debut album. Recording began in October and finished in early December, and took place at EMI Studios (later renamed Abbey Road Studios), Trident and Morgan Studios. The album includes a number of old show tunes, such as "Lullaby of the Leaves" and "Someone to Watch Over Me", which were among the favourites of McCartney's father, Jim, and that McCartney thought Hopkin would sing well. However, Hopkin has been somewhat critical of the song selection, saying that "Paul was quite right to encourage me, but I don’t think my vocals were suited to some of the songs, which I felt were a bit too sophisticated for me".

The album also includes three songs written by Donovan. Two of them, "Lord of the Reedy River" and "Voyage of the Moon", were written for Hopkin, and the third, "Happiness Runs (Pebble and the Man)," had previously been recorded by Donovan. Donovan also performs the acoustic guitar and provides backing vocals on these songs, and Hopkin has described them as her favourites on the album.

"The Puppy Song" was written by Harry Nilsson for Hopkin at the request of McCartney. At the time, Nilsson's records were being listened by everyone at Apple, and he sent over "The Puppy Song". Hopkin's version proved popular at Apple, and it was allegedly in the running to be released as Hopkin's follow-up UK single, but this ended up being the McCartney-written song "Goodbye". Nilsson later recorded his own version on his album Harry, and it also became a number-one hit for David Cassidy in 1973.

Hopkin sang in Welsh on "Y Blodyn Gwyn" ('The White Flower'), which she described as "a traditional tune that we did at school" and one "they always sing at the eisteddfods". She also sang in French on "Prince en Avignon", later saying: "I loved the song before I did it. It’s the track I least like, but not because of the song, simply because I don’t like me on it".

== Release and reception ==
Professional ratings
Review scores
Source	Rating
AllMusic	4.5/5 stars
Encyclopedia of Popular Music	2/5 stars
Mojo	2/5 stars
Rolling Stone	(favourable)
Tom Hull	B

It was originally hoped to release Post Card in time for the Christmas market, before being pushed back to early in the New Year of 1969. The album was eventually scheduled for release on 21 February 1969 in the UK. A launch party took place at the Post Office Tower in London on 13 February 1969 that was attended by a number of rock stars including Jimi Hendrix, Brian Wilson, Eric Clapton, Donovan, and McCartney. Hopkin was also presented with a gold disc for one million unit sales of "Those Were the Days". Post Card was released in the US on 3 March, ten days after its UK release. "Those Were the Days" was not included on the UK release of Post Card, but it was included on the North American release, replacing "Someone to Watch Over Me".

The album cover depicts a photograph of Hopkin taken by McCartney's future wife Linda Eastman at Kew Gardens. McCartney then asked postcard-making company Valentine's to make a limited edition of postcards with this picture.

The reissue in 2010 included both "Those Were the Days" and "Someone to Watch Over Me", as well as four bonus tracks, including "Turn! Turn! Turn!" which was the B-side of "Those Were the Days", and Hopkin's second single "Goodbye" with its B-side "Sparrow". The final bonus track was a previously unreleased version of "Fields of St. Etienne", which had been intended as Hopkin's third single in September 1969, but it ended up being cancelled at her request as she felt it was not in keeping with her musical vision. She later recorded a much simpler version of the song with McCartney which was released as the B-side of "Que Sera, Sera (Whatever Will Be, Will Be)" in 1970. Alongside the reissue of Post Card, four versions of "Those Were The Days" in Italian, Spanish, German, and French were released as a digital download.

Retrospectively, AllMusic critic Richie Unterberger deemed "Lord of the Reedy River" to be one of the album's highlights. Rolling Stone critic John Mendelsohn regarded Hopkin's voice as being well-suited to the Donovan songs, although he considered the songs themselves to be "ponderous and over-long". Unterberger felt that the only problem with the album was that it contained too many pre-rock standards, in accordance with McCartney's tastes, which were not as well suited to Hopkin as more simple folk songs. Mendelsohn praised McCartney's production as much as Hopkin's singing.

== Track listing ==
=== Original UK version ===
Side one
No.	Title	Writer(s)	Length
1.	"Lord of the Reedy River"	Donovan	2:37
2.	"Happiness Runs (Pebble and the Man)"	Donovan	2:03
3.	"Love Is the Sweetest Thing"	Ray Noble	3:43
4.	"Y Blodyn Gwyn"	Richard H. Jones, Edward John Hughes	3:08
5.	"The Honeymoon Song"	William Sansom, Mikis Theodorakis	2:07
6.	"The Puppy Song"	Harry Nilsson	2:42
7.	"Inchworm"	Frank Loesser	2:33

Side two
No.	Title	Writer(s)	Length
8.	"Voyage of the Moon"	Donovan	5:52
9.	"Lullaby of the Leaves"	Bernice Petkere, Joe Young	2:33
10.	"Young Love"	Ric Cartey, Carole Joyner	2:11
11.	"Someone to Watch Over Me"	George Gershwin, Ira Gershwin	2:02
12.	"Prince en Avignon"	Jean-Pierre Bourtayre	3:20
13.	"The Game"	George Martin	2:40
14.	"There's No Business Like Show Business"	Irving Berlin	4:03
Total length:			41:34

=== Original US version ===
Side one
No.	Title	Writer(s)	Length
1.	"Lord of the Reedy River"	Donovan	2:33
2.	"Happiness Runs (Pebble and the Man)"	Donovan	2:01
3.	"Love Is the Sweetest Thing"	Noble	3:42
4.	"Y Blodyn Gwyn"	Jones, Hughes	3:06
5.	"The Honeymoon Song"	Sansom, Theodorakis	2:05
6.	"The Puppy Song"	Nilsson	2:42
7.	"Inchworm"	Loesser	2:31

Side two
No.	Title	Writer(s)	Length
8.	"Voyage of the Moon"	Donovan	5:52
9.	"Lullaby of the Leaves"	Petkere, Young	2:32
10.	"Young Love"	Cartey, Joyner	2:09
11.	"Those Were the Days"	Gene Raskin	5:07
12.	"Prince en Avignon"	Bourtayre	3:19
13.	"The Game"	Martin	2:37
14.	"There's No Business Like Show Business"	Berlin	4:01
Total length:			44:17

=== 2010 bonus track version ===
No.	Title	Writer(s)	Length
1.	"Those Were the Days"	Raskin	5:10
2.	"Lord of the Reedy River"	Donovan	2:39
3.	"Happiness Runs (Pebble and the Man)"	Donovan	2:05
4.	"Love Is the Sweetest Thing"	Noble	3:46
5.	"Y Blodyn Gwyn"	Jones, Hughes	3:11
6.	"The Honeymoon Song"	Sansom, Theodorakis	2:09
7.	"The Puppy Song"	Nilsson	2:44
8.	"Inchworm"	Loesser	2:37
9.	"Voyage of the Moon"	Donovan	5:56
10.	"Lullaby of the Leaves"	Petkere, Young	2:36
11.	"Young Love"	Cartey, Joyner	2:15
12.	"Someone to Watch Over Me"	Gershwin, Gershwin	2:06
13.	"Prince en Avignon"	Bourtayre	3:23
14.	"The Game"	Martin	2:43
15.	"There's No Business Like Show Business"	Berlin	4:13
16.	"Turn! Turn! Turn!" ("Those Were the Days" B-side)	Pete Seeger	2:51
17.	"Goodbye"	John Lennon, Paul McCartney	2:27
18.	"Sparrow" ("Goodbye" B-side)	Benny Gallagher, Graham Lyle	3:12
19.	"Fields Of St. Etienne" (previously unreleased version)	Gallagher, Lyle	3:48
20.	"Quelli erano giorni" (digital download)	Raskin, Diano	5:11
21.	"Que tiempo tan feliz" (digital download)	Raskin, José Carreras Moysi	5:10
22.	"An jenem Tag" (digital download)	Raskin, Heinz Korn	5:10
23.	"Le temps des fleurs" (digital download)	Raskin, Eddy Marnay	5:09
Total length:			80:31

== Personnel ==
Musicians

- Mary Hopkin – lead vocals, background vocals, acoustic guitar (2)
- Paul McCartney – acoustic guitar (1, 8), bass (2, 11)
- Donovan – acoustic guitar (1, 2, 8)
- George Martin – piano (14)
- Derek Griffiths – guitar
- Jim Rodford – bass
- Bernie Higginson – drums
- Mike Cotton – trumpet
- John Beecham – trombone
- Nick Newell – saxophone
- London Welsh Choir – choir (10)
- uncredited – harp (4)

Technical

- Paul McCartney – production
- Ken Scott – engineer, mixing
- Malcolm Toft – engineer
- Richard Hewson – arrangements (11, 12)
- Linda Eastman – photography
- Gordon House – graphics

== Charts ==
Chart (1969)	Peak position
Canada Top Albums/CDs (RPM)	24
UK Albums (Official Charts)	3
US Billboard 200	28
