= Oasis (1980s band) =

British music group (1984)

Oasis were a British music group. Formed in 1984, the group consisted of Peter Skellern, Julian Lloyd Webber, Mitch Dalton, Bill Lovelady and Mary Hopkin.

Their only album, Oasis, was released on the WEA label along with two singles. The album reached No. 23 on the UK Albums Chart after first charting in April 1984; it remained in the charts for 15 weeks.

A tour of the United Kingdom was planned for September 1984. A new cellist, Audrey Riley, was brought in to replace Lloyd Webber whose solo commitments forced him to leave. The tour, however, was brought to an abrupt end when Hopkin became ill. The group disbanded shortly afterwards.

When the Manchester band of the same name became successful in the 1990s, Skellern called Liam and Noel Gallagher "louts", and said: "While it's obvious that they revere the Beatles, the Beatles were bright people and never rude. You didn't see photographs of John Lennon sticking two fingers up at everyone." He went on to say, "My Oasis never had the same press coverage when I was lead singer – but then again, I'm not Liam Gallagher."
