= Flamingokvintetten =

Swedish musical group

- Origin: Partille, Sweden
- Genres: Dansband
- Years active: 1960–2022
- Labels: Platina; Mariann; Flam
- Members: Hasse Carlsson; Dennis Janebrink; Stefan Kardebratt; Douglas Möller; Ulf Georgsson
- Website: flamingokvintetten.se

Flamingokvintetten was a Swedish dansband formed in Partille in 1960. The group consisted of Hasse Carlsson (lead vocals and rhythm guitar), Dennis Janebrink (bass guitar), Stefan Kardebratt (keyboards), Douglas Möller (lead guitar) and Ulf Georgsson (drums).

== Personnel ==
Final members

- Hasse Carlsson – guitars, vocals (1960–2022)
- Dennis Janebrink – bass (1960–2022)
- Stefan Kardebratt – keyboards (2005–2022)
- Douglas Möller – guitars (2008–2022)
- Ulf Georgsson – drums (2013–2022; died 2024)

Former members

- Bjarne Lundqvist – drums (1960–1963, 1993–2007)
- Gunnar Karlsson – guitars (1960–1984)
- Carl-Mårten Nilsson – keyboards (1960–1965)
- Boris Estulf – drums (1963–1993)
- Åke Andersson – keyboards, saxophones, flutes, clarinets (1966–1978)
- Askin Arsunan – keyboards (1978–1980)
- Hans Otterberg – keyboards (1980–2002)
- Henrik Uhlin – guitars, saxophones (1984–2008)
- Fredrik Strelvik – keyboards (2002–2004)
- Lars Lindholm – drums (2007–2013)

== Discography ==
- Harrli! Harrlå! (1967)
- Ja' går ut med hunden! Sticker ut ett slag... (1968)
- Chin Chin (1969)
- Hälften av varje (1970)
- Flamingokvintetten 1 (1970)
- Flamingokvintetten 2 (1972)
- Flamingokvintetten 3 (1972)
- Flamingokvintetten 4 (1973)
- Flamingokvintetten 5 (1974)
- Flamingokvintetten 6 (1975)
- Flamingokvintetten 7 (1976)
- Singel LP (1977)
- Flamingokvintetten 8 (1977)
- Flamingokvintetten 9 (1978)
- Flamingokvintetten 10 (1979)
- Flamingokvintetten 11 (1980)
- Flamingokvintetten 12 (1981)
- Flamingokvintetten 13 (1982)
- Flamingokvintetten 14 (1983)
- Flamingokvintetten 15 - En vän du kan väcka mitt i natten (1984)
- Flamingokvintetten 16 (1985)
- Flamingokvintetten 17 - Flickan från Heidelberg (1986)
- Flamingokvintetten 18 (1987)
- Flamingokvintetten 19 (1988)
- Flamingokvintetten 20 (1989)
- Flamingokvintetten 21 (1992)
- Samma tid samma plats (1993)
- Favoriter (1996)
- Lata dagar med dig (1997)
- Da Capo (2000)
- Amor (2001)
- Tack & förlåt (2010)
- Den här sången... (2012)
