= Goodbye (Mary Hopkin song) =

1969 song performed by Mary Hopkin

- US picture sleeve

Single by Mary Hopkin
- B-side: "Sparrow"
- Released: 28 March 1969
- Recorded: 1 March 1969
- Studio: Morgan, Willesden, London
- Genre: Folk
- Length: 2:23
- Label: Apple
- Songwriter: Lennon–McCartney
- Producer: Paul McCartney

Mary Hopkin singles chronology
"Those Were the Days" (1968)	"Goodbye" (1969)	""Que Sera Sera" (US) (1969) / "Temma Harbour" (UK)" (1970)

"Goodbye" is a song written by Paul McCartney (but credited to Lennon–McCartney) and performed by Mary Hopkin. It was released on 28 March 1969, and it reached No. 2 in the UK singles chart, prevented from reaching the top position by the Beatles' single "Get Back". In the US, released 7 April 1969, the song reached No. 13 on the singles chart. In the Netherlands and Ireland the single peaked at No. 1.

== Background ==
The song was conceived as a follow-up to the success of Hopkin's first single, produced by McCartney, titled "Those Were the Days", which was highlighted on her debut album Postcard, one of the first records issued by the newly founded Apple Records. In later years, McCartney had little recollection of creating the song, which was written in a great hurry to capitalise on Hopkin's popularity, but he did recall being told by a boat skipper from the Orkney Islands that it was the man's favourite song, which seemed appropriate to McCartney since, "if you think of it from a sailor's point of view, it's very much a leaving-the-port song."

== Recording ==
A year went by [after I first recorded for Apple] before [Paul McCartney] wrote "Goodbye." And that was after I'd said, "Look, how about another single?" But I understood. Obviously his priority was the Beatles, that's natural. ... It's a good song for its kind, but whether it was suited to me, I don't know.

— Mary Hopkin, 1995

To assist Hopkin in learning the song, McCartney recorded a solo demo at his home, 7 Cavendish Avenue, London, in early February 1969. This demo was later released on the Abbey Road: 50th Anniversary Edition in 2019. The song was arranged by Richard Hewson, who had also orchestrated "Those Were the Days," and produced, along with its flip side, "Sparrow", by Paul McCartney on 1 March 1969 at Morgan Studios in Willesden. To better match Hopkin's voice, the key was raised from C major to E major. The recording was Apple's first official double-A-side, and the first Apple record to feature a full-fledged picture sleeve.

For the recording, Hopkin sang and performed acoustic guitar, while McCartney played bass guitar, an acoustic guitar introduction and solo, along with lap-slapping percussion and drums. Backing vocals, horns and strings, in Hewson's arrangement, were overdubbed. The session was filmed by Apple's Tony Bramwell for a promotional clip. In the footage, Hopkin can be seen miming to the song inside the studio, combined with shots of her and McCartney in the control room listening to a playback.

The flip side "Sparrow" was written by Benny Gallagher and Graham Lyle, a songwriting duo signed to Apple Publishing. The recording took place on 2 March 1969; Hopkin sang and played guitar, McCartney added maracas, a session musician played upright bass, and Hewson arranged a choir part.

Mary Hopkin met her future husband, record producer Tony Visconti, while making foreign-language versions of the song.

The song was one of only two hits to be omitted from the compilation disc The Songs Lennon and McCartney Gave Away, issued originally in 1971 and re-released in 1979.

On 28 April 2014, "Goodbye" was released digitally along with "Those Were the Days" on Mary Hopkin Music.

== Reception ==
Billboard praised Hopkin's "fine vocal work" and McCartney's "exceptional" production. Cash Box described it as a "melodic lilter with a tap dance track and some powerful instrumental work." Record World called it "a charming Lennon–McCartney tune ... about a girl with a wanderlust." Allmusic critic Richie Unterberger described "Goodbye" as a "pleasant and catchy romp, rather like a Continental European folk love ballad in tone, with a dash of music hall."

== Personnel ==
- Mary Hopkin – lead vocals, acoustic guitar, backing vocals
- Paul McCartney – acoustic guitar (intro and solo), bass, drums, piano, ukulele, lap-slapping percussion, backing vocals
- Richard Hewson – orchestra arrangement

== Paul McCartney recording ==
"Goodbye"

Demo by the Beatles

from the album Abbey Road: 50th Anniversary Edition
- Released: 27 September 2019
- Recorded: February 1969
- Studio: St John's Wood, London
- Genre: Folk, pop
- Length: 2:23
- Songwriter: Lennon–McCartney

For many years bootleg recordings existed of McCartney's original demo of the song, recorded for Mary Hopkin. The international online magazine PopMatters published McCartney's demo along with critical commentary expressing a preference for the composer's version over Hopkin's rendition.

The original demo by McCartney was officially released on Abbey Road: 50th Anniversary Edition in 27 September 2019.

== Chart performance ==
=== Weekly charts ===
Chart (1969)	Peak position
Argentina (CAPIF)	7
Australia (Kent Music Report)	2
Belgian Singles Chart	7
Brazil (ABPD)	3
Canada RPM Top Singles	15
Canada RPM Adult Contemporary	3
Danish Singles Chart	3
Dutch Single Top 100	1
Finnish Singles Chart	4
French SNEP Chart	9
Irish Singles Charts	1
Israel Singles Chart	5
New Zealand (Listener)	2
Norway Singles Chart	3
Polish Singles Chart	4
Portugal (AFP)	1
Swedish Kvällstoppen Chart	3
Swedish Singles Chart	4
UK Singles Chart	2
US Billboard Hot 100	13
US Billboard Easy Listening	6

=== Year-end charts ===
Chart (1969)	Rank
UK	19
US (Joel Whitburn's Pop Annual)	117
US Adult Contemporary (Billboard)	41
