= Temma Harbour =

1970 song written by Philamore Lincoln

- Cover of variant picture sleeve

Single by Mary Hopkin
- B-side: "Lontano Dagli Occhi"
- Released: 16 January 1970
- Genre: Folk
- Length: 3:20
- Label: Apple
- Songwriter: Philamore Lincoln
- Producer: Mickie Most

Mary Hopkin singles chronology
"Goodbye" (1969)	"Temma Harbour" (1970)	"Knock, Knock, Who's There?" (1970)

"Temma Harbour" is a song written by Robert Anson, under the pseudonym Philamore Lincoln, who released it on his album The North Wind Blew South in January 1970. The song refers to an inlet of the same name on the island of Tasmania.

The song is better known for the version by Welsh folk singer Mary Hopkin, also released in January 1970. It was her first single on Apple Records not to be produced by Paul McCartney, but instead by Mickie Most, who also rearranged the song. It peaked at number 6 on the UK Singles Chart and number 39 on the Billboard Hot 100.

Cash Box said that "a bit of folk, and just a taste of the steel-band touch hidden in strings makes this a refreshing change from the ballad norm." Billboard called it an "infectious rhythm item." Record World predicted that "Temma Harbour" would replicate the success of her previous two singles.

The B-side, "Lontano Dagli Occhi", was written by Sergio Endrigo and Sergio Bardotti and Hopkin's performance had finished in second place at the Sanremo Music Festival in early 1969. Cash Box called it a "striking side with 'Moonlight Sonata' traces and an excellent vocal."

== Track listing ==
1. "Temma Harbour" – 3:20
2. "Lontano Dagli Occhi" – 3:21

== Charts ==
Chart (1970)	Peak position
Australia (Kent Music Report)	6
Canada Top Singles (RPM)	42
Canada Adult Contemporary (RPM)	4
Ireland (IRMA)	3
Malaysia (Radio Malaysia)	4
Netherlands (Dutch Top 40)	16
Netherlands (Single Top 100)	12
New Zealand (Listener)	3
Rhodesia (Lyons Maid)	19
Singapore (Radio Singapore)	1
UK Singles (Official Charts)	6
US Billboard Hot 100	39
US Adult Contemporary (Billboard)	4
