= Ingmar Nordströms =

- Origin: Växjö, Sweden
- Genres: Dansband music
- Years active: 1955-1991 (contemporary reunions in 1997-1998 and 2005)
- Labels: Frituna

Ingmar Nordströms was a dansband from Växjö, Sweden that was established in 1955 by Ingmar Nordström. Their first appearance occurred in the Eringsboda folkpark. Their last appearance occurred in Växjö on 19 December 1991. In 1987, the band won a Grammis award in the "Dansband of the Year" category.

== Discography ==
=== Albums ===
Title	Release
I parken med Ingmar Nordströms	1970
På party med Ingmar Nordströms	1971
På Oléo	1972
Vi vill sjunga, vi vill spela	1973
Saxparty 1	1974
Saxparty 2	1975
Saxparty 3	1976
Saxparty 4	1977
Saxparty 5	1978
Saxparty 6	1979
Saxparty 7	1980
Saxparty 8	1981
Saxparty 9	1982
Saxparty 10	1983
Saxparty 11	1984
Saxparty 12	1985
Saxparty 13	1986
Saxparty 14	1987
Saxparty 15	1988
Saxparty 16	1989
Saxparty 17	1990
Saxparty 18	1991
Saxparty guld	1988
På begäran	1998
Saxpartyfavoriter	2007
Fler saxpartyfavoriter	2008

=== Svensktoppen songs ===
Title	Release
Rara underbara Katarina	1977
Farväl San Diego	1978-1979
Tack ska du ha	1978-1979
Darlin'	1979-1980
Om du stannar kvar	1980
Fånga en vind	1980
Ta din reggae en gång till	1980-1981
Oj vilken morgon	1981-1982
Shirley	1982
Jag skall aldrig nå'nsin glömma	1985
Birdie namn-nam	1986
Dansa dansa	1987
Gråa tinningars charm	1988
En gång	1998

=== Famous recordings ===
- The Elephant Song
- One More Reggae for the Road
- Gösta Gigolo
- Tomelilla 6-5000
- Birdie Nam-Nam
- Gråa tinningars charm
- Tweedle-Dee Tweedle-Dum
- Dansa dansa
