= Georgy Kiesewalter =

Russian artist

- Георгий Кизевальтер
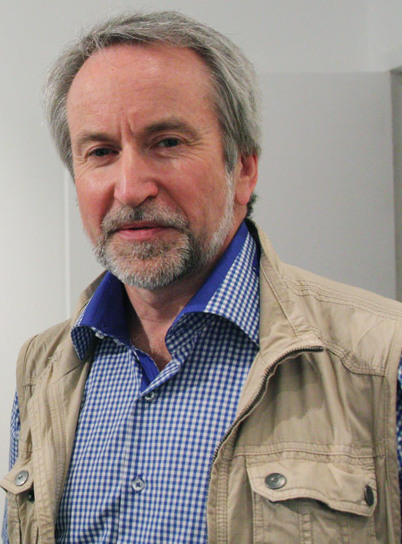
- Georgy Kiesewalter in 2015
- Born: 10 September 1955; Moscow, USSR
- Education: Moscow Pedagogical Institute
- Known for: Performances, visual art, photography
- Movement: neo-conceptualism, postmodernism
- Website: gkiesewalter.net

Georgy Kiesewalter (Russian: Георгий Кизевальтер, b. 1955 in Moscow) is a Russian conceptual artist, photographer and essayist, working in different artistic areas from painting to graphic art, from installations to conceptual photography and digital art.

== Biography ==
Georgy's ancestors were German, which given his Russian background has sometimes been anglicized as Kizevalter or Kisevalter. He graduated from Moscow Lenin Pedagogical Institute in 1977. In 1976–89, he was one of the original members of the Russian conceptual performance group Collective Actions. In the mid-1970s – 1980s, he was very close to the circle of artists like Ilya Kabakov, Viktor Pivovarov, Erik Bulatov, Ivan Chuikov et al., and actively participated in such unofficial artistic formations of the time as the AptArt movement, the Moscow Archive of New Art (MANI), and the Avantgardists' Club in Moscow. In 1996, he decided to move to Canada, but returned to Russia at the end of 2006.

In the early 1990s, Kiesewalter arranged a number of broadcasts on arts and culture issues on Radio Liberty in Munich, Germany. He is also the author or co-author of several books and many articles on contemporary art and photography published in Russia. In 1997, he received an Open Society Institute grant to help publish his first book about Moscow's unofficial artists, The Communal Body of Moscow.

His works can be found in many private and institutional collections, including the Tretyakov Gallery (Moscow), the Jane Voorhees Zimmerli Art Museum at Rutgers, the State University of New Jersey, and the Duke University Museum of Art (USA), Kunstmuseum in Bern, Switzerland, Centre Georges Pompidou, Paris; the National Centre for Contemporary Arts, the Moscow Museum of Modern Art, Garage Museum of Contemporary Art and Ekaterina Cultural Foundation (all in Moscow), the Kolodzei Art Foundation (New Jersey), and many others.

== Major exhibitions ==
- 1976 – Unofficial apartment shows, Moscow
- 1977 – La nuova arte Sovietica: Una prospettiva non ufficiale. La Biennale di Venezia, Venice, Italy
- 1981 – Russian New Wave. Contemporary Russian Art Center of America, New York, USA
- 1983 – Vassya Museum. AptArt Gallery, Moscow (solo exhibition)
- 1984 – AptArt in Tribeca. Contemporary Russian Art Center of America, New York, USA
- 1985 – AptArt. Moscow Vanguard in the ‘80s. Washington Project for the Arts, Washington
- 1988 – Art Chicago
- 1988 – Art Basel
- 1988 – I Live – I See: Moscow Artists of the 1980s. Kunstmuseum Bern, Switzerland
- 1989 – The Green Show. Exit Art, New York, USA; Dunlop Art Gallery, Regina; Mendel Art Gallery, Saskatoon, Canada
- 1990 – Sommer Atelier (Junge Kunst in Europa). Hannover, Germany
- 1990 – G. Kizevalter: And Where is the National School? F. Duran Gallery, Madrid, Spain (solo exhibition)
- 1990 – Towards the Object. Stedelijk Museum Amsterdam
- 1991–1993 Prospects of Conceptualism. The University of Hawaii Art Gallery, Honolulu; The Clocktower Gallery P.S.1, New York; North Carolina Museum of Art, Raleigh, USA
- 1991 – Contemporary Soviet Art. Setagaia Art Museum, Tokyo, Japan
- 1991 – Contemporary Soviet Artists. Auditorio de Galicia, Santiago de Compostela, Spain
- 1991 – MANI Museum: 40 Moskauer Künstler. Frankfurter Karmeliterkloster, Frankfurt am Main, Germany
- 1991 – Kabakov, Kizevalter, Makarevich. Parallel 39 Gallery, Valencia, Spain
- 1993 – Monuments: Transformation for the Future. World Financial Center, New York, USA; Central House of Artist, Moscow; Kunstihoone, Tallinn
- 1995 – Kunst im Verborgenen. Nonkonformisten Ruβland 1957–1995. Wilhelm-Hack-Museum, Ludwigshafen am Rhein; documenta-Halle, Kassel; Staatliches Lindenau-Museum, Altenburg, Germany; Manege Central Exhibition Hall, Moscow
- 1995–1996 Flug, Entfernung, Verschwinden. Konzeptuelle Moskauer Kunst. Galerie Hlavniho Mesta Prahy, Prague; Haus am Waldsee, Berlin; Stadtgalerie im Sophienhof, Kiel, Germany
- 1996 – Fluxus: Yesterday, Today, and Tomorrow. History without Border. Central House of Artists, Moscow
- 1996 – Russian Conceptual Art of the 1980s: the Collection of the Duke University Museum of Art. Nasher Museum of Art at Duke University (USA)
- 1998 – Russian Landscape. Geneva, Switzerland
- 2005 – Collaborators. State Tretyakov Gallery, Moscow (within the framework of the First Moscow Biennale)
- 2006 – Artists Against the State: Perestroika Revisited. Ronald Feldman Gallery, New York
- 2007 – Sots Art. State Tretyakov Gallery, Moscow; La Maison Rouge, Paris
- 2007, 2008, 2009 – Sotheby's Art Auction exhibitions
- 2008 – Total Enlightenment. Conceptual Art in Moscow 1960–1990. Schirn Kunsthalle, Frankfurt am Main, Germany; Fundación Juan March, Madrid
- 2008 – Performing the Archive: Collective Actions in the 1970s-80s. Zimmerli Art Museum at Rutgers, the State University of New Jersey, USA
- 2009 – Not Toys?! State Tretyakov Gallery, Moscow (within the framework of the Third Moscow Biennale)
- 2010 – Field of Action. Moscow Conceptual School and its context. Ekaterina Art Foundation, Moscow
- 2011 – New Hagiography Project. Moscow Museum of Modern Art, Moscow (solo exhibition)
- 2013 – Expansion of the Object. Moscow Museum of Modern Art
- 2013 – Dreams For Those Who Are Awake. Moscow Museum of Modern Art
- 2013 – Department of Labour and Employment. State Tretyakov Gallery, Moscow
- 2014-15 – Rauschenberg: Collecting & Connecting. Nasher Museum of Art at Duke University, Durham, NC, USA
- 2015 – Insider. Garage Museum of Contemporary Art, Moscow (solo exhibition).
- 2016 – “Thinking Pictures”: Moscow Conceptual Art in the Dodge Collection. Voorhees Gallery, Zimmerli Art Museum at Rutgers University. NJ, USA.
- 2016 – Kollektsia ! Contemporary Art in the USSR and Russia. 1950-2000. Centre Georges Pompidou, Paris.
- 2020 – Regaining a Paradise Lost: the Role of the Arts. APS Mdina Cathedral Contemporary Art Biennale, Mdina, Malta.
- 2021 – Waves and Echoes: Postmodernism and the Global 1980s. Beijing Inside-Out Art Museum, China.
- 2021-22 – Other Spaces. In Artists’ Studios. The Ekaterina Cultural Foundation, Moscow (solo exhibition).
- 2022 – Thinking Pictures. Kumu Art Museum, Tallinn, Estonia.
- 2023 – Artist-Collector. The Moscow Museum of Modern Art.

== Books and essays ==
- The Collective Actions group (Monastyrski A., Panitkov N., Alekseev N., Makarevich I., Elagina E., Kiesewalter G., Romashko S., Hensgen S.). Poezdki za gorod [Trips to the Countryside] (In Russian). Moscow: Ad Marginem, 1998. ISBN 5880590372
- Kiesewalter, Georgy. Kommunal'noe telo Moskvy [The Communal Body of Moscow] (In Russian). Moscow: Restart/Polidiz, 1999.
- Kiesewalter, Georgy. Monolog Anatolija Zvereva [Monologue of Anatoly Zverev] In Anatolij Zverev v vospominanijah sovremennikov [Anatoly Zverev in the Memoirs of his Contemporaries] (In Russian). Moscow: Molodaya Gvardiya, 2006. ISBN 5235028686
- Kiesewalter, Georgy, ed. Jeti strannye semidesjatye, ili Poterja nevinnosti [Those Strange Seventies or Loss of Innocence] (In Russian). Moscow: Novoe Literaturnoe Obozrenie, 2010. ISBN 9785867937737
- Kiesewalter, Georgy, ed. Perelomnye vos'midesjatye v neoficial'nom iskusstve SSSR [The Watershed Eighties in Unofficial Soviet Art] (In Russian). Moscow: Novoe Literaturnoe Obozrenie, 2014. ISBN 9785444801420
- Kiesewalter, Georgy. Samizdat kak sredstvo vyzhivanija dlja neoficial'nyh hudozhnikov [Samizdat as a means of survival for unofficial Soviet artists] (In Russian). In Strukova, E., Belenkin, B., eds. Actasamizdatica. Anthology : Issue 2. Moscow: Russian State Historial Library; International Memorial, 2015. ISBN 9785852093660, ISBN 9785990234123
- Kiesewalter, Georgy. Vremja nadezhd, vremja illjuzij. Problemy istorii sovetskogo neoficial'nogo iskusstva. 1950–1960 gody: Stat'i i materialy [Time of Hopes, Time of Illusions. On the Problems of the History of Soviet Unofficial Art. 1950-1960: Articles and Materials] (In Russian). Moscow: Novoe Literaturnoe Obozrenie, 2018. ISBN 9785444807323
- Kiesewalter, Georgy. My Memories of Tõnis Vint; A Visit to Tõnis Vint. In Kunst.ee : Eesti kunsti ja visuaalkultuuri kvartaliajakiri = Quarterly of art and visual culture in Estonia #1, 2022
- Kiesewalter, Georgy. Reportazhi iz-pod-valov. Al'ternativnaja istorija neoficial'noj kul'tury v 1970-h i 1980-h godah v SSSR glazami inostrannyh zhurnalistov, dopolnennaja interv'ju s ee gerojami [Reports from under-the-walls. An alternative history of unofficial culture in the USSR in the 1970s and 1980s through the eyes of foreign journalists, supplemented by interviews with its heroes] (In Russian). Moscow: Novoe Literaturnoe Obozrenie, 2022. ISBN 9785444818138
