= Nikolai Titov =

Russian composer

Nikolai Alexeyevich Titov
- Николай Алексеевич Титов
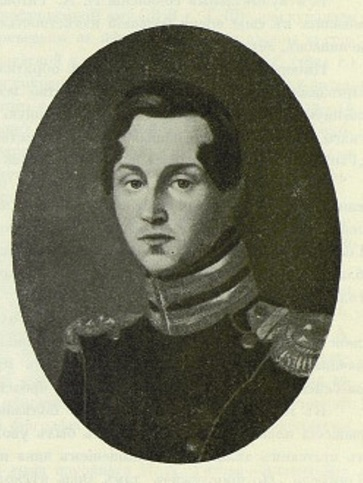
- Born: April 28, 1800; St. Petersburg, Russia
- Died: December 22, 1875 (aged 75); St. Petersburg, Russia
- Resting place: Smolensk Orthodox Cemetery
- Occupation: Composer
- Style: Russian Romance
- Partner: Sofia Alekseevna Smirnova (1820-?)
- Children: Nikolai Nikolaevich (1842-?), Alexander Nikolaevich (1842-?)
- Father: General A. N. Titov
- Relatives: Sergei Titov (Uncle) Nikolai Sergeyevich Titov (Cousin)
- Awards: Order of Saint George

Nikolai Alexeyevich Titov (Russian: Николай Алексеевич Титов; 10 May 1800 in St. Petersburg – 22 December 1875 in St. Petersburg) was a Russian composer, violinist, and Major General in various regiments during the 19th century. He is considered to be the "Grandfather of the Russian Romance." His compositional style was considered to be in the pre-classical orientation, thus setting the groundwork for the developments by Glinka and his contemporaries. He is considered to be one of the most popular romance composers of the 19th century. His songs were praised for their homely sensibility and ruminative harmonic language, albeit encased in simple yet effect forms that appealed to the at-home Amateurs and seasons musicians alike. His repertoire can still be heard today.

== Family and children ==
Nikolai Alexeyevich Titov was born on April 28, 1800, in St. Petersburg to a family of art song and small-form composers. Titov also had a younger brother named Mikhail Alekseyevich, who was likewise a notable and technically proficient composer of romances, salon plays, and other small genres during the 19th century.

Nikolai Titov was married in 1893 to Sofia Alekseevna Smirnova, great grandmother of Russian Postwar painter Natalya Nesterova, and went on to have two sons named Nikolai Nikolaevich and Alexander Nikolaevich.

Titov's cousin, Nikolai Sergeevich (1798–1843), is recorded as being the true author of at least 18 songs that were previously asserted to be Titov's.

== Life ==
Nikolai Titov was born April 28, 1800, in St. Petersburg, and is the son of General A. H. Titov. Titov's godfather was the Emperor Alexander I, who was then still the heir to the throne of the Russian Empire following Alexander's passing. He received general education until the age of 8 at home, then in the First Cadet Corps, although two years after his admission he had to leave due to poor health, after which he visited several private boarding houses, from which he completed the course at the boarding house of Saint-Florent, Haute-Corse.

In 1817 he was appointed as an Ensign in the Preobrazhensky Regiment. In 1819 he was transferred to the Finnish Life Guards Regiment, and on March 27, 1822, he was promoted to Officer.

In 1830 he retired for domestic reasons to Pavlovsk, but in 1833, at the suggestion of the sovereign himself, he again entered military service - in the Life Guards of His Imperial Highness, Grand Duke Mikhail Pavlovich's Ulan Regiment. In February 1834, he fell from his horse and was badly hurt, becoming bedridden for a long time after. After his recovery, he left combat services and was transferred as an Official of special assignments to the Commissariat Department, where he later held consecutive positions - Superintendent of a state factory of Officer Affairs, Director of a Moose Factory, and a Member of the General Presence.

On November 26, 1849, he was awarded the Order of St. George 4 cl. No. 8203:

For the impeccable service of 25 years in the officer ranks

He retired in 1867 with the rank of Lieutenant General. He died on December 10, 1875, and is buried at the Smolensk Orthodox Cemetery.

== Musical career ==
Titov's family ancestry extends back a millennium, and many prominent musically inclined persons are included in Titov's chronology. His lineage stems back three cycles and merges military careerdom and musical composition work. Thus, composing and musical adeptness had always been an important secondary, albeit a secondary none of the less. More colloquially known as the Enlightened Amateur status, this class of non-specialist yet highly passionate individuals had been the vital cornerstone of cultural development in Russia during the 19th century, as due to salons, balls, and other artistically minded groups had sprung up everywhere, giving members of the Russian aristocracy and well-off individuals the chance to create and contribute, despite their varying degrees of formalistic training. Adjacent with the Russian Enlightenment, the amateur composer had taking a foothold in the Russian gentry, and the distinction between Patron, composer, and audience member were forever blurred. In this changing landscape, the Titov "dynasty" would begin to be created.

At the head was Nikolai Sergeevich Titov, a composer, poet and playwright who had primarily dealt with folk-infused musical comedies. However, he is most known for his involvement in contributing to an expansive network of theatrical hostings and private venues in/around 1766-1769 prior to their centralization with the founding of The Bolshoi Theater in 1776. Additionally, his Uncle Sergei Titov and cousin Nikolai Sergeyevich were also involved in the compositional atmosphere in Russia, although their presences and works have all but been forgotten.

Although Titov's notoriety as an evocative and well-developed Amateur composer, Benefactor and highly venerated Salon host, his compositional career had no straight path nor prediction for future success. For although he was granted preliminary training by tutors and family members when he was younger, and was born into a relatively musical family, he quickly started to develop a distaste for musical ventures, and pursued military life instead. His father, A. N. Titov adamantly attempted to coax the young Titov into musical life, but was not successful initially. At age 8 he entered into the First Cadet Corps, and would not venture back to music until around age 19. Once he began formal training, he quickly improved thanks in part to the private training in music-theory he received from Italian composer, notable guitarist, and pedagogue Mauro Giuliani. Due to this, he became far more proficient and trained than his brother Mikhail Alekseyevich.

Beginning around 1819, his love of music started to grow and he then began dabbling in composition, producing rudimentary works as exercises before finally creating one of his first pieces, that being a romance around the anonymous poem "Rendez la moi cette femme chérie." This was enough to convince his father that his son could still have a musical career yet, and recommended he take theory and composition lessons in a formal manner. Thus, he quickly began digesting theory treatises and learning compositional rules, along the way learning how to play the piano. However, due to his late-blooming and fairly self-taught stature, using the theoretical teachings and works of Italian composers like Giovanni Zamboni and Carlo Evasio Soliva to improve his technical capabilities and create his aesthetic pallet, he was never able to progress farther than Amateur status and enter in the grosser historical record. Despite his social success as a Romance composer, alongside contemporaries like Alyabyev, Verstovsky, and Varlamov, he never developed further than salon repertoire and other more elementary forms and was noted as being harmonically and structurally simple in comparison with his father's practiced aptitude.

In the 1820s, Titov began publishing his dance works professionally and in frequent regularity, beginning in 1823 with the publication La Harpe du Nord, and again in 1824 with the square dance "Vieux péchès" in A-minor on themes of Russian folk-songs, a novelty in the early 19th century. Additionally, in 1824 he began publishing his military marches which became instantly popular and were used thoroughly within the Courts, so much so that he had regular, commission work from Grand Dukes Nikolai and Mikhail Pavlovich themselves. In total, over 30 instrumental works were attributed to his name, along with some poetry, although his quatrains are regarded as underwhelming and insignificant creations. Some of his texts for his songs may be his own poetry as well.

Around the 1830s, Titov made his acquaintance with two, more well-known Russian composers, namely M. Glinka and A. Dargomyzhsky. Titov would routinely ask them for advice regarding compositional qualms and career troubles. Right from the initial meeting, the two had become in favor of the soldier-turned-composer/Patron and enjoyed his compositions. Titov's relationship with another progenitor of the Russian romance style Alexander Varlamov, was matured to the point that Varlamov had dedicated his romance "The Vagrant's Nightingale" to his buoyant and genuine friend. His demeanor was one of a youthful glow and he shared a sincere devotion to the Russian national consciousness. Thus, when the Russian taste started turning towards Italian sensibilities and foreign operatic styles, he mourned the lack of attentive noticings of the [now] historically recognized composers such as his two, original colleagues and mentors Glinka and Dargomyzhsky:

"All that is ours, Russian, dear, we do not know how to value it, and to our shame we incense and worship everything foreign... But the time will come when the worthy will be rewarded worthy. "

In 1830, aftering have spent about 13 years in the Preobrazhensky Regiment, he settled in Pavlovsk, St. Petersburg, where in the same year a collection of his works set to Russian and French texts was published, although only about 10 of his songs, with only a handful of his dances and piano works, ever officially appeared in publiciation.

== Evening salons ==
His residence in St. Petersburg, during his lifetime, became one of the most prolific places for prestigious evening gatherings or salons, where the Russian Intelligentsia and nobility would venture for evenings of artistic performance and socializing. A frequent guest was Titov's own younger brother Lieutenant-General Sergei Nikolaevich Titov (1770-1825), a musician himself in cello and viola, along with being a minor composer, mainly creating vaudeville operas, with some of his works incorrectly assessed to be of his eldest brother's hand. He also wrote ballets, most notably "New Werther", written in 1799 based on the Germanic epistolary or fictionally-authentic story The Sorrows of Young Werther by J. W. von Goethe.

During these evening salons, a variety of chamber-inspired compositions and smaller-form instrumental/vocal works were intimately performed. Due to the well attendance by notable luminaries and social celebrities of the day, Titov's younger brother Mikhail Titov was inspired to pursue a musical career.

== Style ==
Because of his taste for dance provocations, albeit within the context of simpler overall designs, his works tend to use upbeat rhythms in the guise of more conventional forms. Many song used dances as the underpinning like the gallop, waltzes, polka, and especially the quadrille. However, the most notable aspect of his work came from the personable and intimate atmospheres that his romances, of which he was best known, cultivated in the listener. His works were imbued with an authentic air through utilizing simple and more comprehensible forms, coupled with an unfettered harmonic framework creating in-turn a profoundly inviting and pleasurable effect. Titov's public appeal came from his expert command of melody, which adhered to typical song form (ABA), resulting in a cyclical aesthetic which was easily recognizable and catchy. Additionally, Titov's piano works, while less dramatic and more miniature in size, were popular among Amateur, home audiences for their simplistic beauty and attainable, yet emotionally effective, language.

It is noted that, although his developments in strophic form and inviting harmonicity were praiseworthy, he still had clear theoretical mistakes when it came to musical grammar and prosody.

== Russian romance ==
Due to his public acclaim and compositional notoriety, he was given the sobriquet "The Grandfather of the Russian Romance," due to his exceptional handling of the genre during his lifetime. Further, the name is derived from his purported publishing of the first "official" Russian romance named "Solitary Pine," released in the 1820s and documented by the Author Ivan Turgenev in his book "Notes of a Hunter," otherwise known as "A Sportsman's Sketches." Despite the haughty nickname, the genre of Russian romance had prematurely existed well before Titov's popularizing, about 10–15 years earlier with the experimental creations by long forgotten composers like K. Shalikov, one of the first to use the word "virtuoso" in published musical critique, and Prince Pavel Ivanovich Dolgorukov. Despite their work in cultivating the foundations of the genre Titov, along with contemporaries like Alyabyev and Varlamov, are more than due the title of Grandfather, as his songs were at the societal forefront and answered the widespread need for such convivial repertoire. The changing tastes and proclivity for balls and cotillions, formal social events, and more intimate gatherings of the Russian aristocracy and well-to-do gentry, along with a greater proliferation of musical access in all other classes, meant that there was a requirement not only for dance-like repertoire, but easy-to-understand and melody-driven songs which could touch the listener via emotional appeals and earnest passion.

His musical works, ever since first being published in the 1820s, had become situated in the common consciousness and could be heard in salons and homes across the country, solidifying Titov's legacy.

In response to the Russian success at repellency, albeit with extensive Russian losses and suffering endured therein, against Napoleon's forces during The French invasion of Russia in 1812, the rise of Russian patriotism grew significantly, leading to the turn-away from foreign musical influences like that from Italian, German, or French heritage. Once the national spirit had coalesced into a singular focus on freedom, the lineage of political skirmages would commence, the chronology traceable through the Decembrist Revolution of 1825 all the way to the October Revolutions of 1917 and the downfall of Russian aristocracy itself. In the realm of Russian art, close interest was placed on the real experiences of Russian life, in particular urban culture began to grow with the birth of home music-making and the birth of the Russian commercial piano industry as early as 1801. The rise of decentralized music-making saw the rise of small-form, vocal works like songs and romances, the most popular form being the elegy, a poetic form primarily used to convey solemn, melancholic and somber subject matter, along with introspective ponderings of life and its tumults.

Originally, these elegies were kept in typical, cyclical verse form [ABA], known as tertiary form, and its harmonies of a sympathetic, almost nostalgic temperament, along with mild usage of dramatic tinges, both in poetic lyricism and general musical language. It's noted that the elegies and romances that survive to this day from this time period were created as a way to valorize and upgrade the proto-romance genre. The instigators of such change were inspired to cultivate a fuller life to the romance and embrace a true, programmatic or narratival experience through the musical life itself. This push towards capitalizing on and liberating the genre from the starkness of song form by enriching the musical fabric with commentative, life-like characteristics, in other words equalizing the expressive poeticism with an equally as compelling musical life, was of the utmost importance and continued to be throughout Russian music's historical development.

His first romance "Solitary Pine" was published in 1820, with words by M.Ofrosimov, thus triggering an elongated composition career and the serious beginning of the Russian romance genre. His corpus of songs, totalling up to 100 individual songs, gained widespread popularity among the critics, who though they were charming inclusion for at-home entertainment and "a pleasant gift for our amateur singers."

== Compositions ==
=== Opera ===
- 1805: Cupid-Judge, or Dispute of the Three Graces (words by Y.B. Knyazhnin)
- Before 1817: These are the Russians, or The Courage of the Kievites" (words of the Knyazhnin, staged in 1817)
- 1823: Nurzahad (words by Y.B. or the Triumph of Oliar)
- The Brewer, or the Lingering Spirit (staged under Catherine II)
- The Trial of King Solomon (words by S. Glinka, staged under Paul I)
- A Minute Delusion (words by S. Glinka)
- Beautiful Tatiana on Sparrow Hills
- The Soldier and the Shepherd

=== Polka ===
- Птичка Божия не знает

=== Waltz ===
- В минуту жизни трудную
- Native Sounds
- Родные звуки
- Mon Salut a Pawlowsk
- Весенний букет
- Maria-Valse
- Alexander-Valse
- Die Eigensinnige

=== Romance ===
- Я не скажу вам, кто она
- Уединенная сосна
- Шарф голубой
- Мальвина
- Коварный друг
- Какая грусть владеет мной
- Звездочка
- К Морфею
- Прости на долгую разлуку
- Призвание
- Гусли мои, гусли
- Мечта любви
- Песня ямщика
- Колыбельная песня
- Горные вершины

=== Square dance ===
- Vieux poches in A minor

=== March ===
- Kia-King March [based on the opera Little Red Riding Hood]
- Quick march of Life Guards Semenovsky Regiment (1826)
- March of Life Guards Finlandsky Regiment

=== Book ===
- 1867: Memoirs

== Recordings ==
- Mascot, Antique Waltz (I.P. Zakharov)
- 1948-1950: 3 Waltzes, Melodia (Yelena Alexandrovna Bekman-Shcherbina)
- 2014: Old Polish March for the Semenovsky Regiment, Historische Armee-Märsche Folge 19 (Blas-Orchester in Historischer Besetzung)

== See also ==
- Russian Romance
- Russian chanson
- Russian traditional music
- List of Russian composers
