= Oleg Vassiliev (painter) =

Russian painter

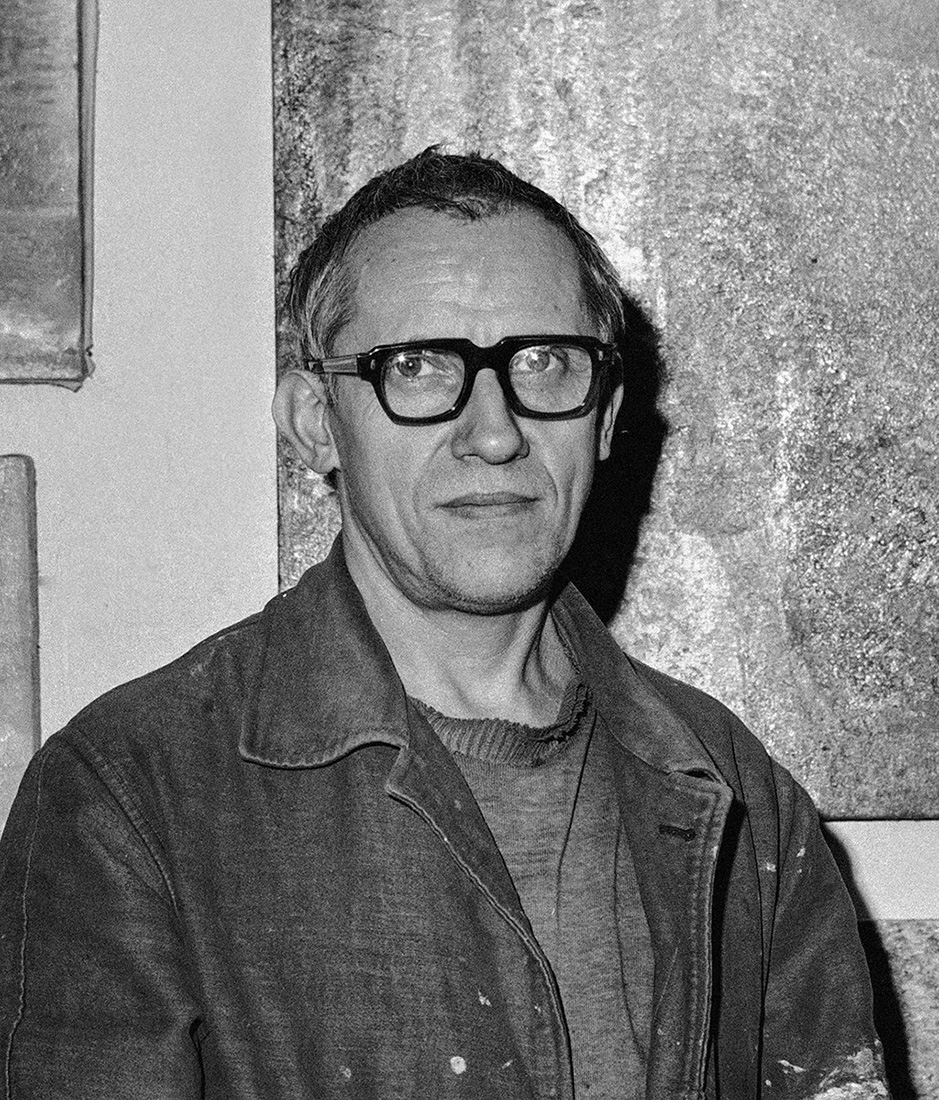
Image of Oleg V. Vassiliev

Oleg Vassiliev (Russian: Олег Владимирович Васильев; November 4, 1931; Moscow – January 25, 2013) was a Russian painter associated with the Soviet Nonconformist Art style. Vassiliev emigrated to the United States, arriving in New York City in 1990 and later lived and worked in St. Paul, Minnesota.

== Education ==
Vassiliev graduated from V.I. Surikov State Art Institute, Moscow, in 1958. In the late 1950s he became influenced by the Russian avant-garde formalists, Vladimir Favorsky (1886–1964), Robert Falk (1886–1958), and Artur Fonvizin (1883–1973).

== Biography ==
From the 1950s through the 1980s, Vassiliev worked with friend and collaborator Erik Bulatov as a children's book illustrator. They developed a unique style of illustration that combined realist painting with graphic elements, such as text. This "official" source of income provided the means and materials for Vassiliev to take part in the Soviet Nonconformist Art movement, also known as "unofficial" or "dissident" art. Along with friends, Ilya Kabakov, Erik Bulatov and Viktor Pivovarov, Vassiliev belonged to a large group of Soviet artists that took advantage of the Nikita Khrushchev "thaw" in official policy that opened up the Soviet Union to Western culture in the years following Joseph Stalin's death in 1953.

== Style ==
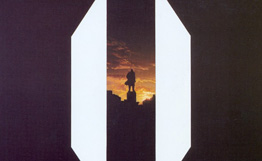
Pered rasvetom (Before the Sunrise), 1964

During this period of time Vassiliev developed his mature style. In his art Vassiliev combines the traditions of Russian Realism (art movement) of the 19th century with the Russian avant-garde of the beginning of the 20th century. "Vassiliev's principal themes, which were born while he was in Russia and continue to the present day, are his memories of home and houses, roads, forests, fields, friends and family. Vassiliev always starts his creative process from a very personal memory, from his sacred space, the safeguarded inner center, and connects it with the visual image. Vassiliev masterfully incorporates elements from different times and spaces and arranges them throughout his paintings according to the logic and 'energetic' space of the painting."

"Leading Soviet graphic artist Vladimir Favorsky was a major influence on Vassiliev's work. Favorsky emphasised the constructive qualities of image-making, understanding painting as a rhythmic organisation of space swirling about time. Such abstract aesthetic thought was alien to mainstream Soviet Realism and demonstrates the liberties afforded graphic designers during this period. With a preoccupation for the structural qualities of a composition, these aesthetics also find their origin in Russian Constructivism of the 1920s.

"...Vassiliev's recurring preoccupation with light and shade in his oeuvre also points to a psychological dimension, with light symbolising consciousness and dark, the subconscious. Elements of German Romanticism influence his thought. He searches for answers in an unfathomable world, posing questions without obvious answers and leaving the viewer feeling nonplussed, a hallmark of Postmodernist art...."

== Public collections ==
- Art Museum, Murmansk, Russia
- Denver Art Museum, Denver, Colorado, USA
- Kunstmuseum Bern, Bern, Switzerland
- The Ludwig Forum for International Art, Aachen, Germany
- Mead Art Museum at Amherst College, Amherst, Massachusetts, USA
- The Metropolitan Museum of Art, New York City, NY, USA (Children's Book Illustrations)
- Nasher Museum of Art at Duke University, Durham, North Carolina, USA
- The New Museum, St. Petersburg, Russia
- Norsk-Russisk Kunstsenter Galleri, Kirkenes, Norway
- The Pushkin State Museum of Fine Arts, Moscow, Russia
- Staatliche Kunstsammlungen Dresden, Dresden, Germany
- The State Center of Contemporary Art, Moscow, Russia
- The State Hermitage Museum, St. Petersburg, Russia
- The State Russian Museum, St. Petersburg, Russia
- The State Tretyakov Gallery, Moscow, Russia
- University of Kentucky Art Museum, Lexington, Kentucky
- Van Abbemuseum, Eindhoven, Netherlands (Children's Book Illustrations)
- Zimmerli Art Museum at Rutgers University, New Brunswick, New Jersey, USA (The Norton and Nancy Dodge Collection of Soviet Nonconformist Art)
- Art4.ru, Moscow, Russia
- The Costakis Collection, Athens, Greece
- Kolodzei Art Foundation, Highland Park, New Jersey, USA

== Exhibition history ==
=== Solo exhibitions ===
- 2017 "Metro Series & Selected Works on Paper from the Kolodzei Art Foundation", Harriman Institute, Columbia University, New York, NY
- 2014 - 2015 Oleg Vassiliev: Space and Light, Zimmerli Art Museum, New Brunswick, NJ (cat.)
- 2013 "Oleg Vassiliev: Paintings 1967-2012", Faggionato Fine Arts, London (cat.)
- 2011 - 2012 The Art of Oleg Vassiliev: Paintings and Drawings, The Museum of Russian Art, Minneapolis, MN (cat.)
- 2008 - 2009 Oleg Vassiliev: Recent Work, Faggionato Fine Arts, London (cat.)
- 2007 Oleg Vassiliev: Drawings, Forum Gallery, New York, NY (cat.)
- 2004 Memory Speaks (Themes and Variations), retrospective, The State Tretyakov Gallery, Moscow, traveled to The State Russian Museum, St. Petersburg (cat.)
- 2000 Recent Works, Galerie Andy Jllien, Zurich
- 2000 The Past Isn't Dead, It Isn't Even Past, University Art Gallery, University of Massachusetts, Dartmouth (cat.)
- 1999 Works 1987-1995, Blomquist, Oslo, Norway (cat.)
- 1999 On Black Paper, Wake Forest University Fine Arts Gallery, Winston-Salem, North Carolina, traveled to Denison University Art Gallery, Granville, Ohio (cat.)
- 1997 Oleg Vassiliev, Phoenix Gallery, Moscow
- 1996 Litografier til Tsjekhovs novelle ‘Husel med Arken’, Oljemalerier Galleri Cassandra, Drobak, Norway (cat.)
- 1995 Windows of Memory, Sloane Gallery, Denver
- 1995 Conceptual Posters by Oleg Vassiliev, Art Museum of the University of Kentucky, Lexington
- 1993 Recent Works, Phyllis Kind Gallery, New York
- 1991 Oleg Vassiliev, Galeria Fernando Duran, Madrid (cat.)
- 1968 Oleg Vassiliev, Bluebird Café, Moscow

=== Group exhibitions ===
- 2021 The Ironic Curtain: Art from the Soviet Underground, July 3 - September 12, 2021, Columbia Museum of Art, Columbia, SC, USA
- 2017 Red Horizon: Contemporary Art and Photography in the USSR and Russia, 1960-2010, Columbus Museum of Art, Columbus, OH, USA (cat)
- 2016 Exhibit Russia: The New International Decade, Garage Museum of Contemporary Art, Moscow, Russia.
- 2015-2016 200 Keystrokes per Minute: Typewrited and the 20th-Century Consciousness, Moscow Museum of Modern Art, Moscow, Russia
- 2015 Po dorogam skazki : knizhnai︠a︡ grafika Ėrika Bulatova, Olega Vasilʹeva, Ilʹi Kabakova, Viktora Pivovarova iz chastnykh kollekt︠s︡iĭ i sobranii︠a︡ GMII im. A.S. Pushkina. Pushkin State Museum of Fine Arts, Moscow, Russia. (Children's book illustrations only)
- 2014 The Blinding Light of History: Genia Chef, Illya Kabakov, and Oleg Vassiliev: Russian paintings and drawings from the collection of Wayne F. Yakes, MD., University of New Mexico Art Museum, Albuquerque, NM
- 2013 Concerning the Spiritual in Art, 1965-2011, The Museum of Russian Art, Minneapolis, MN
- 2013 Frieze Masters – Faggionato Booth, London Art Fair, UK
- 2013 Dreams for Those Who Are Awake: The 5th Thematic Exhibition of the Moscow Museum of Art, Moscow, Russia
- 2012-2013 Breaking the Ice: Moscow Art 1960s-80s, Saatchi Gallery, London (cat.)
- 2012 848: The Collection of Georges Matcheret and Nadia Wolkonsky, State Hermitage Museum, St. Petersburg, Russia. (cat)
- 2010 Glasnost': Soviet Non-Conformist Art from the 1980s, Haunch of Venison, London (cat.)
- 2010 Shattered Utopia: Russian Art of the Soviet and Post Soviet periods from the Wayne F. Yakes, M.D. Collection. Fort Collins Museum of Contemporary Art, Fort Collins, CO (cat.)
- 2006 Soviet Alternative Art (1956-1988), From the Costakis Collections, State Museum of Contemporary Art, Athens, Greece
- 2005 Russia! Solomon R. Guggenheim Museum, New York (cat.)
- 2005 Collage in Russia XX Century, The State Russian Museum, St. Petersburg (cat.)
- 2004 Berlin-Moscow/Moscow-Berlin, Kunst 1950-2000, The State Tretyakov Gallery, Moscow, Martin Gropius Bau, Berlin (cat.)
- 2004 REMEMBRANCE: Russian Post-Modern Nostalgia, Yeshiva University Museum, New York (cat.)
- 2004 Global Village: The 1960s, The Montreal Museum of Fine Arts, Canada (cat.)
- 2003 Finding Freedom: 40 Years of Soviet and Russian Art, Selections from the Kolodzei Collection of Russian and Eastern European Art, The Bergen Museum of Art and Science, Paramus, New Jersey
- 2002 Moskauer Avantgarde: Grisha Bruskin, Erik Bulatov, Ilya Kabakov, Dmitri Prigov, Oleg Vassiliev, Andy Jllien Gallery, Zurich
- 2002 Malevich, Cinema and Beyond, Centro Cultural de Belem, Lisbon (cat.)
- 2002 National Center for Contemporary Art, Moscow
- 2001 Realities and Utopias, Jane Voorhees Zimmerli Art Museum, New Brunswick, New Jersey (cat.)
- 2001 Cold War/Hot Culture; American and Russian Nonconformist Art, Barrick Museum, University of Las Vegas, Nevada
- 2000 Seeing Isn't Believing: Russian Art Since Glasnost, The Lamont Gallery, Phillips Exeter Academy, Exeter, New Hampshire (cat.)
- 2000 Art of XXth Century Permanent Exhibition. The State Tretyakov Gallery, Moscow, Russia
- 1999 Forbidden Art: The Postwar Russian Avant-Garde, organized by International Art and Artists, Washington, DC, traveled to: Miami University Art Museum, Oxford, Ohio; The State Russian Museum, St. Petersburg; The State Tretyakov Gallery, Moscow; Alyce de Roulet Williamson Gallery, Art Center College of Design, Pasadena, California; McMullen Museum, Boston College, Massachusetts; Bruce Museum of Art and Science, Greenwich, Connecticut (cat.)
- 1999 It's the Real Thing…Soviet and Post-Soviet Sots Art and American Pop Art, Frederick R. Weisman Art Museum, University of Minnesota, Minneapolis (cat.)
- 1998 The Russian Thaw, Tabakman Gallery, New York
- 1998 Selections from the Norton and Nancy Dodge Collection of Nonconformist Art of the Soviet Union, Museum of Fine Art, St. Petersburg, Florida
- 1996 Art Russia, Radar, Rome (cat.)
- 1995 Flug, Entfernung, Verschwinden, Konzeptuelle Kunst aus Moskau, Sadgalerie im Sophenhot, Kiel Haus am Waldesee, Berlin (cat.)
- 1995 From Gulag to Glasnost: Nonconformist Art from the Soviet Union, The Jane Voorhees Zimmerli Art Museum, Rutgers University, New Brunswick, New Jersey (cat.)
- 1995 The Damaged Utopia, Kraftmessen, Munich (cat.)
- 1995 Russian Images 1966-1995, Morlan Gallery, Transylvania University, Lexington, Kentucky
- 1995 Group Show, Phyllis Kind Gallery, New York
- 1995 A Mosca…A Mosca, Museum Kunstverein, Karlsruhe, Germany (cat.)
- 1994 Works on Paper, Kolodzei Collection of Contemporary Russian Art, Oklahoma City, Oklahoma
- 1994 No! and the Conformists. Faces of Soviet Art 1950-1980, Dunikowski Museum Palac, Krolikarni, Poland and The State Russian Museum, St. Petersburg (cat.)
- 1994 Zeitgenossen, Kunstmuseum, Bern
- 1994 Stalin's Choice: Soviet Socialist Realism 1932-1956, P.S.1, Long Island City, New York
- 1993 Monuments: Transformation for the Future, Central House of Artists, Moscow
- 1993 Temporary Address for Contemporary Russian Art, Post Museum, Paris
- 1993 Old Symbols, New Icons in Russian Contemporary Art, Stuart Levy Gallery, New York
- 1993 M’AIDEZ/MAYDAY, Phyllis Kind Gallery, New York
- 1993 Tre Kunstneres syn pa Tjekov, Norsk-Russisk Kunst Senter, Kirkenes, Norway
- 1993 After Perestroika: Kitchenmaids or Stateswomen, Centre International d’Art Contemporain de Montreal, Canada (cat.)
- 1993 Monumental Propaganda, exhibition organized by Komar & Melamid and Independent Curators Incorporated, New York, traveled to: Courtyard Gallery, World Financial Center, New York; The Institute of Contemporary Art, Moscow; AI Gallery, Institute of History, Tallinn, Estonia; Moderna Galerija Ljubljana, Slovenia; Dunlop Art Gallery, Regina, Saskatchewan; The Muckenthaler Art Center, Fullerton, California; The Bass Museum of Art, Miami Beach; Kemper Museum of Contemporary Art, Kansas City, Missouri; Helsinki City Art Museum, Finland; Uppsala Konstmuseum; Helsinki; Kennisaw State University, Georgia (cat.)
- 1992 Lianozovo-Moscow: Vsevelod Nekrasov's Russian Art Collection, Bohum Museum, Bohum, Germany
- 1992 Three Points of View, Center of Contemporary Art, Moscow (cat.)
- 1992 A Mosca…A Mosca, Villa Campolieto, Herculaneaum, Italy and Museum of Modern Art, Bologna (cat.)
- 1992 Erik Bulatov and Oleg Vassiliev, Phyllis Kind Gallery, New York (cat.)
- 1991 Artistos Rusos Contemporaneos, Auditorio de Galicia, Santiago de Compostela, Spain
- 1991 Erik Bulatov/Oleg Vassiliev, Phyllis Kind Gallery, New York
- 1991 Group Exhibition, The State Literature Museum, Moscow
- 1991 Back to Square One, Berman-E.N. Gallery, New York (cat.)
- 1991 The Other Art: Moscow 1956-1976, The Tretyakov Gallery, Moscow and The Russian Museum, Leningrad (cat.)
- 1991 Soviet Contemporary Art: From Thaw to Perestroika, Setagaya Museum, Tokyo
- 1990 Logic of Paradox, Palace of Youth, Moscow
- 1990 Alternative Art of the 60s, Soviet Foundation of Culture, Moscow
- 1990 Contemporary Soviet Art: Adaptation and Negation of Socialist Realism, Aldrich Museum of Contemporary Art, Ridgefield, Connecticut (cat.)
- 1990 Foire International d’Art Contemporain (FIAC 90), Paris
- 1989 Erik Bulatov/Oleg Vassiliev, Phyllis Kind Gallery, New York
- 1989 From the Revolution to Perestroika, Soviet Art of the Ludwig Collection, Kunstmuseum Luzern, Switzerland, traveled to Palau de la Virreina-Ajuntment de Barcelona, Spain, and Musee d’Art Moderne de St. Etienne, France (cat.)
- 1989 Photo in Painting, First Gallery, Moscow
- 1989 Behind the Ironic Curtain, Phyllis Kind Gallery, New York
- 1989 100 Artists from the Kolodzei Collection, The State Museum of Fine Arts, Tashkent, Uzbekistan, USSR
- 1988 Ich Lebe, Ich Sene, Kunstmuseum, Bern (cat.)
- 1988 No Problem, Exhibition Hall Begovaya Ulitza, Moscow
- 1987 Direct from Moscow, Phyllis Kind Gallery, New York
- 1987 Soviet Art, Marconi Galleria, Milan and Rome
- 1987 The Artist and His Time, Exhibition Space, Kashirskoye Shosse, Moscow
- 1982 Photography and Painting, Conference and Exhibition at the Center of Aesthetics, Moscow
- 1982 New Tendencies of Soviet Unofficial Art 1956-1981, Villedien Culture Center, Elancourt, France
- 1981 25 Years of Soviet Unofficial Art 1956-1981, The C.A.S.E. Museum of Unofficial Soviet Art, Jersey City
- 1977 La Nuova arte sovietica: una prospettiva non ufficiale (New Soviet Art: a Non-official Prospective), Venice Biennale

== Bibliography ==
- 2017: Cann, Tyler and Drew Sawyer, Red Horizon: Contemporary Art and Photography in the USSR and Russia, 1960–2010, Columbus Museum of Art, Columbus, OH, USA.

- 2017: Tupitsyn, Margarita, Moscow Vanguard Art, 1922–1992, Yale University Press, New Haven, CT, USA.

- 2016: Fowle, Kate and Ruth Addison, Exhibit Russia: The New International Decade, Garage Museum of Contemporary Art, Moscow, Russia.

- 2016: Glasser, David, Yalta 1945: Komar and Melamid, Ben Uri Gallery and Museum, London, UK.

- 2015: Po dorogam skazki : knizhnai︠a︡ grafika Ėrika Bulatova, Olega Vasilʹeva, Ilʹi Kabakova, Viktora Pivovarova iz chastnykh kollekt︠s︡iĭ i sobranii︠a︡ GMII im. A.S. Pushkina, Moscow, Russia.

- 2014: Tulovsky, Julia et al., Oleg Vassiliev: Space and Light, Zimmerli Art Museum at Rutgers, The State University of New Jersey, New Brunswick, NJ, USA.

- 2014: The Blinding Light of History: Genia Chef, Illya Kabakov, and Oleg Vassiliev: Russian paintings and drawings from the collection of Wayne F. Yakes, MD., University of New Mexico Art Museum, Albuquerque, NM, USA.

- 2013: Johansen, Oivind, The Chekhov Project, 1988–2013, Oivind Johansen, Oslo, Norway.

- 2013: Rosenfeld, Alla, Vorletzte Wahrheiten: Russische Kunst Zwischen Metaphysik und Konzept, (The Penultimate Truth), Stiftung Ahlers Pro Arte, Kestner Pro Arte, Hannover, Germany.

- 2012: Erofeev, Andrei, Breaking the Ice: Moscow Art 1960-80s, MAIER, Moscow, Russia.

- 2012: Lopatkina, E.V. 848: The Collection of Georges Matcheret and Nadia Wolkonsky. State Hermitage Museum, St. Petersburg, Russia.

- 2012: Tsukanov, Igor, The Tsukanov Art Collection, London, UK.

- 2011: Yau, John et al., The Art of Oleg Vassiliev, The Museum of Russian Art, Minneapolis, MN, USA.

- 2011: Amirsadeghi, Hossein, ed. Frozen Dreams: Contemporary Art from Russia, Thames & Hudson, New York, NY, USA.

- 2011: Rosenfeld, Alla, Moscow Conceptualism: In Context, Prestel, Zimmerli Art Museum at Rutgers University, New York, NY, USA.

- 2010: Shattered Utopia: Russian Art of the Soviet and Post-Soviet periods from the Wayne F. Yakes, M.D. Collection, Nov 19-Dec 30, 2010. Fort Collins Museum of Contemporary Art, Fort Collins, CO, USA.

- 2010: Joseph Backstein, Ekaterina Degot, Boris Groys and Olga Sviblova. Glasnost: Soviet Non-Conformist Art from the 1980s, Haunch of Venison, Galerie Volker Deihl, London, UK.

- 2010: Jackson, Matthew Jesse. The Experimental Group: Ilya Kabakov, Moscow Conceptualism, Soviet Avant-Gardes, University of Chicago Press, Chicago, IL, USA.

- 2009: Tupitsyn, Victor. The Museological Unconscious: Communal (Post) Modernism in Russia. MIT Press, Cambridge, MA, USA.

- 2008: Gisbourne, Mark, Oleg Vassiliev: Recent Work, Faggionato Fine Arts, London, UK.

- 2008: Tulovsky, Julia, ed. The Claude and Nina Gruen Collection of Contemporary Russian Art, Jane Voorhees Zimmerli Art Museum, New Brunswick, NJ, USA.

- 2007: Prose, Francine, Oleg Vassiliev: Drawings, Forum Gallery, New York, NY, USA.

- 2007: Thiemann, Barbara M., ed., (Non)conform Russian and Soviet Art: The Ludwig Collection 1958–1995, Prestel, Munich, Genrmany.

- 2006: Tsantsanoglou, Maria. Soviet Alternative Art (1956-1988), From the Costakis Collections, State Museum of Contemporary Art, Athens, Greece.

- 2005: Vassiliev, Oleg intro by Erik Bulatov, et al., Oleg Vassiliev: Windows of Memory, Liberty Prize, (Олег Васильев: окна памяти) New Literature Survey, Moscow, Russia.

- 2005: Bernstein, David, et al. Collage in Russia, XX Century, The State Russian Museum, Palace Editions, St. Petersburg, Russia.

- 2005: Franzen, Elizabeth, et al., eds., Russia! Nine Hundred Year of Masterpieces and Master Collections: Catalogue of the Exhibition, Guggenheim Museum Publications, New York, NY, USA.

- 2005: Shwydkoi, Mikhail, et al. Russia! Nine Hundred Years of Masterpieces and Master Collections, Guggenheim Museum Publications, New York, NY, USA.

- 2004: Ye. Petrova, N. Kolodzei et al., Oleg Vassiliev: Memory Speaks: Themes and Variations, St Petersburg: Palace Editions, Moscow, Russia.

- 2004: Neumaier, Diane, ed., Beyond Memory: Soviet Nonconformist Photography and Photo-Related Works of Art, Zimmerli Art Museum at Rutgers University Press, New Brunswick, NJ, USA.

- 2003: Aquin, Stephane, ed., Global Village: The 1960s, Montreal Museum of Fine Arts, Montreal, Canada.

- 2003: Choroschilow, Jurgen Harten, Joachim Sartorius, Peter-Klaus Schuster, ed., Berlin-Moscow, Moscow-Berlin Chronik 1950–2000, volume 1, Nicolai, Berlin, Germany.

- 2003: Choroschilow, et al., eds., Berlin-Moscow, Moscow-Berlin Kunst 1950–2000, volume 2, Nicolai, Berlin, Germany.

- 2003: Gertsman, Alexandre. Remembrance: Russian Post-Modern Nostalgia. International Foundation of Russian and Eastern European Art, Inc., New York, NY, USA.

- 2002: Moskauer Avantgarde: Grisha Bruskin, Erik Bulatov, Ilya Kabakov, Dmitri Prigov, Oleg Vassiliev, Galerie Andy Jllien, Zurich, Switzerland.

- 2002: Tupitsyn, Margarita. Malevich and Film, Yale University Press, New Haven CT, USA.

- 2000: The Lamont Art Gallery. Seeing Isn't Believing. Russian Art Since Glasnost. Exter, NH, USA.

- 2000: Sharp, Jane, Realities and Utopias : Abstract Painting in the Norton and Nancy Dodge Collection of Nonconformist Art from the Soviet Union; November 12, 2000 – January 14, 2001, Zimmerli Art Museum at Rutgers University Press, New Brunswick, NJ, USA.

- 2000: Wallach, Amei, Oleg Vassiliev: Recent Works, Galerie Andy Jllien, Zurich, Switzerland.

- 2000: Antonsen, Lasse, Oleg Vassiliev: The Past Isn't Dead, It Isn't Even Past, University Art Gallery, University of Massachusetts Dartmouth, North Dartmouth, MA, USA.

- 1999: Bulatov, Eric, Oleg Vassiliev: Works 1987–1999. Blomqvist Kunsthandel, Oslo, Norway.

- 1999: Bulatov, Eric and Holo, Selma Reuben, Oleg Vassiliev: On Black Paper, 1994–1997, Neil K Rector, Columbus, OH, USA.

- 1999: Kabakov, Ilya. 60th-70th...Notes on Unofficial Life in Moscow. Wiener Sloawistischer Almanach, Soncdlerband 47, Wien, Austria.

- 1998: Barbabanov, Yevgeni, Forbidden Art. The Postwar Russian Avant-Garde, Distributed Art Publishers, New York, NY, USA.

- 1998: Khidekel, Regina. It's Real Thing. Soviet and Postsoviet Sots Art and American Pop Art. University of Minnesota Press, Minneapolis, MN, USA.

- 1998: Tupitsyn, Victor. Communal (Post) Modernism. (Kommunalnyi (post)modernizm: Russkoe iskusstvo vtoroi poloviny XX veka) (Passe-partout) Ad Marginem, Moscow, Russia.

- 1998: Bown, Matthew C. Socialist Realist Painting. Yale University Press, New Haven, CT, USA.

- 1998: Kulakov, Vladimir. The Poetry as a Fact. (Поэзия как факт: статьи о стихах /Poezia kak fakt: statʹi o stihah) Novoye Literaturnoye Obozrenie, Moscow, Russia.

- 1997: Jolles, Paul R. Memento aus Moskau. Begegnungen mit inoffiziellen Kunstlern, 1978–1997. Wienand, Koln, Germany.

- 1997: Tupitsyn, Victor. The Other of the Art. / "Drugoe" iskusstva: Besedy s khudozhnikami, kritikami, filosofami, 1980-1995 gg (Passe-partout). Ad Marginem, Moscow, Russia.

- 1997: Tupitsyn, Margarita. The Critical, The Optical. (Kriticheskoe opticheskoe: Statʹi o sovremennom russkom iskusstve) (Passe-partout). Ad Marginem, Moscow, Russia.

- 1996: Art Russia, Radar, Rome, Italy.

- 1996: Oleg Vassiliev: Litografier til Anton Tsjekhovs novelle ‘Huset med Arken’, Oljemalerier, Galleri Cassandra, Drobak, Norway.

- 1996: Zhuravljeva, Anna, and Nekrassov, Vsevolod. "Chekhov - non-Chekhov" in Packet, Meridian, Moscow, Russia.

- 1995: Erofeev, Andrei, and Martin, Jean-Hubert. Kunst un Verborgenen. (Nonkonformisten Russland 1957–1995. Prestel, New York, NY, USA.

- 1995: Tupitsyn, Margarita, The Damaged Utopia or Kräftemessen eine Ausstellung ost-östlicher Positionen innerhalb der westlichen Welt, Cantz, Ostfildern, Germany.

- 1995: Rosenfeld, Alla and Norton T. Dodge, eds., From Gulag to Glasnost: Nonconformist Art: The Soviet Experience 1956–1986, Thames and Hudson, New York, NY USA.

- 1995: Bulatov, Eric, Oleg Vassiliev: Windows of Memory, The Sloane Gallery of Art, Denver, CO, USA.

- 1995: Baigall, Renee and Matthew Baigall. Soviet Dissident Artists: Interviews after Perestroika. Rutgers University Press, New Brunswick, NJ, USA.

- 1995: Andreeva, Ekaterina. Sots Art: Soviet Artists of the 1970s-1980s. Craftsman House, G+B Arts International, Roseville East, NSW Australia.

- 1995: Rosenfeld, Alla and Norton T. Dodge, eds., Nonconformist Art: The Soviet Experience 1956–1986, Thames and Hudson, New York, NY, USA.

- 1994: No! and the Conformists : Faces of Soviet Art of 50s to 80s = Net! - i konformisty: obrazy sovetskogo iskusstva 50-x do 80-x godov = Nie! - i konformisci: oblicza sztuki radzieckiej lat 50. do 80. Polish Modern Art Foundation. Wydawnictwa Artystyczne i Filmowe, Warsaw, Poland.

- 1993: Tupitsyn, Margarita, After Perestroika: Kitchenmaids or Stateswomen. Independent Curators, Inc., New York, NY, USA.

- 1993: Ashton, Dore. Monumental Propaganda / instigated by Komar and Melamid. Independent Curators Inc., New York, USA.

- 1993: Tupitsyn, Victor, Oleg Vassiliev: Recent Works, Phyllis Kind Gallery, NY, USA.

- 1993: Who is Who in Contemporary Art in Moscow. (Kto estʹ kto v sovremennom iskusstve Moskvy). Album, Moscow, Russia

- 1992: Bonito Oliva, Achille and Leonid Bazanov, A Mosca...a mosca... Olograf Edizioni, Verona, Italy.

- 1992: Three Points of View, Center for Contemporary Art, Moscow, Russia.

- 1991: Levkova-Lamm, Innesa, Back to Square One, Berman Gallery, New York, NY, USA.

- 1991: Tupitsyn, Margarita and Victor, Erik Bulatov Oleg Vassilyev, Phyllis Kind Gallery, New York, NY, USA.

- 1991: The Other Art. 2 Volumes. Vol 1 Moscow 1956–1976, Materials for Chronique Art Life. Vol 2 Catalogue, "Drugoe iskusstvo": Moskva, 1956–76; k khronike khudozhestvennoĭ zhizni, Interbook, Moscow, Russia.

- 1991: Solomon, Andrew, The Irony Tower: Soviet Artists in a time of Glasnost, Alfred A. Knope, New York, NY, USA.

- 1991: Bulatov, Eric, Oleg Vassiliev. Galeria Fernando Duran, Madrid, Spain.

- 1990: Adaptation and Negation of Socialist Realism. Alderich Museum of Contemporary Art, Ridgefield, CT, USA.

- 1989: Lisenkova, E.A., Zhivopisʹ, grafika: Ėrik Bulatov, Oleg Vasilʹev, Ėduard Gorokhovskiĭ, Ilʹi︠a︡ Kabakov, Ivan Chuĭkov: catalog, Moskovskaia organizatsiia Soiuza khudozhnikov, Moscow, Russia.

- 1989: Erik Bulatow, Wladimir Jankilewski, Ilja Kabakow, Oleg Wassiljew. Kupferstich-Kabinett der Staatlichen Kunstsammlungen. Dresden, Germany.

- 1989: Brown, Matthew Cullerne, Contemporary Russian Art, Oxford: Phaidon Press Limited, New York, NY, USA.

- 1989: Tupitsyn, Margarita, Margins of Soviet Art: Socialist Realism to the Present, Giancarlo Politi Editore, Milan, Italy.

- 1988: Marconi, Giorgio, Artisti Sovietici Contemporanei, Studio Marconi, Electa, Milan, Italy.

- 1988: Tavel, Hans Christoph van and Markus Landert, Ich Lebe. Ich Sehe. Kunstler der Achtziger Jahre in Moskau, Kunstmuseum Bern, Bern, Switzerland.

- 1977: Crispolti, Enrico and Moncada, Gabrielle, La Nuova Arte Sovietica: Una Prospettiva Non Ufficiale, La Biennale di Venezia, Marsilio, Venezia, Italy.

== Videos / Documentaries ==
- 2013: The House with the Mezzanine Part 2 Lecture by Dr. Alla Rosenfeld at Mead Art Museum, Amherst, MA, USA. (Click link to watch: )

- 2013: The House with the Mezzanine Part 1, Lecture by Dr. Maria Zavialova at Mead Art Museum, Amherst, MA, USA. (Click link to watch: )

- 2012: Oleg Vassiliev, Exhibition Video, by The Museum of Russian Art, Twin Cities Public Television, Inc, Minneapolis, MN, USA. (Click link to watch: )

- 2009: The Russian Concept, Documentary Video, by Igor Sopronenko, Signature Media Production LLC, Lexington, KY, USA. (Click link to watch: )

- 2006: Oleg Vassiliev, Interview in Russian (excerpt from Russian Concept), by Igor Sopronenko, Signature Media Production LLC, Lexington, KY, USA. (Click link to watch: )

- 1990: USSR Art, Documentary Video, by Barbara Herbich, Direct Cinema LTD., Santa Monica, CA, USA.

== Articles ==
- 2014, October: John Hansgard Gallery, "Paper Museums: Moscow Conceptualism in Transit”, Artforum, New York, NY, USA.

- 2014, February: Asfour, Nana, ArtNews: Art Talk - Road to Moscow, New York, NY, USA.

- 2013, November: Oleg Vassiliev: Paintings 1967–2012, Artforum, New York, NY, USA.

- 2007, March: Oleg Vassiliev: Drawings, Art in America, New York, NY, USA.

- 2004: Alexejev, Alexej, et al., A-Ya: Unofficial Russian Art Review 1979-1986 "Oleg Vassiliev," Paris, France.

- 2003: Tupitsyn, Victor. “Low Budget Theory and Philosophy of Art in Post-Soviet Russia,” Third Text, Routledge, London, UK.

- 2002: Nekrasov, Vsevelod. Zhivu Vizhu (Live and See), Moscow, Russia.

- 2002: Kolodzei, Natalia. “The Past Isn't Dead. It Isn't Even Past,” ArtChronika, Moscow, Russia.

- 2000, November 26: Boyce, David. “Exhibit's Memory Themes Intrigues,” Standard Times, New Bedford, MA, USA.

- 2000, February 25: Ilyina, M. “On the Wave of My Memory,” Novoye Russoye Slovo

- 1999, Nov 3: Flor, Harold. “Nostalgi,” Dagbladet, Oslo, Norway.

- 1999, October: Bass, Ruth. “Oleg Vassiliev. Wake Forest Fine Art Gallery,” ArtNews, New York, NY, USA.

- 1998: Tupitsyn, Margarita. “Back in the USSR,” Flash Art, Milan, Italy.

- 1998, February 5: Minneles, Maria. “Oleg Vassiliev's Black Forest.” Pravda 5, No. 16 (426)

- 1998, July/August / September: Tupitsyn, Victor. “Icons on Iconoclasm,” Parachute, Montreal, Canada.

- 1997: Vassiliev, Oleg. “How I Became and Artist,” Pastor, Cologne, Germany.

- 1995, October 18: Solomon, Andrew. “Works from Underground, Freed by Glasnost,” The New York Times, New York, NY, USA.

- 1995, October 25–31: Puglia, Michael. “Out the Window,” Westword, Denver, CO, USA.

- 1994, Summer: Solomon, Andrew. “Oleg Vassiliev/Erik Bulatov,” Artforum, New York, NY, USA.

- 1994: Kabakov, Ilya. “SHEK No. 8, Bauman-Bezirk, Stadt Moskau,” Reklam Verlag, Leipzig, Germany.

- 1993, November 26: Smith, Roberta. “Art in Review: Oleg Vassiliev,” The New York Times, New York, NY, USA.

- 1993, November 12: Wallach, Amei. “Soviet Expression Born of Crisis,” New York Newsday, New York, NY, USA.

- 1992, January 31: “Oleg Vassiliev,” Techniarte

- 1992: Bulatov, Erik. “In Search of Lost Time. Notes on Oleg Vassiliev's Works,” Balcon

- 1991, May: Kuspit, Donald. “Erik Bulatov, Oleg Vassiliev,” Artforum, New York, NY, USA.

- 1991: Vassiliev, Oleg. “Home with an Attic. Tale of an Artist,” Balcon

- 1990, July 12: Tyler, Betty. “Aldrich Exhibit Draws Critics, Collectors,” Fairpress, Westport, CT, USA.

- 1990, December: Seitz, Hennig. “The Market for Soviet Art,” Contemporanea, New York, NY, USA.

- 1990, March: Heartney, Eleanor. “Oleg Vassiliev and Erik Bulatov at Phyllis Kind,” Art in America, New York, NY, USA.

- 1990, May/June: Tupitsyn, Victor. “Erik Bulatov/Oleg Vassiliev,” Flash Art, Milan, Italy.

- 1989, July/August: Clothier, Peter. “In the Moscow Studios, A Report from the Soviet Union,” Artspace, New York, NY, USA.

- 1989, March: Chemiakin, Mikhail. “Oleg Vassiliev,” Art of Russia and the West, Apollon Foundation, Torino, Italy.

- 1989, March 24: Wallach, Amei. “Symbolic Humans: Behind the Ironic Curtain,” New York Newsday, New York, NY, USA.

- 1986, October 7: Barringer, Felicity. “The Unofficial Artist's Life in Russia,” The New York Times, New York, NY, USA.

- 1981: Birger, Boris, (Warum das Moskauer Kulturleben trotzdem interessant ist) Die Kunstzeitschrift, magazine, v. 6, DU, Hamburg, Germany.

- 1980: Alexejev, Alexej, et al., A-Ya: Unofficial Russian Art Review 1979-1986 "Oleg Vassiliev," Paris, France
