= Kolodzei Art Foundation =

The Kolodzei Art Foundation's logo, created by Erik Bulatov

The Kolodzei Art Foundation, Inc. promotes the contemporary art of Russia and Eastern Europe. The Kolodzei Art Foundation often utilizes the artistic resources of the Kolodzei Collection of Russian and Eastern European Art, one of the world's largest private collections, with over 7,000 artworks by over 300 artists from Russia, Eastern Europe and the former Soviet Union.

The Foundation has held exhibitions at such museums as the Hermitage Museum, the State Tretyakov Gallery, the State Russian Museum, the Central House of Artists, National Center for Contemporary Art, Harriman Institute at Columbia University, MARS Contemporary Art Center, the Chelsea Art Museum, the Leepa-Rattner Museum of Art, the Bergen Museum of Art and Science, the MADI Museum, and elsewhere.

== Mission ==
The Kolodzei Art Foundation, founded in 1991, arranges art exhibitions in museums, universities and cultural centers throughout the United States, Russia and Europe. Its Board of Directors includes distinguished business, diplomatic and cultural figures in US-European-Russian relations. The Kolodzei Art Foundation also arranges Russian-American cultural exchanges, grants financial stipends to artists for the purpose of studying and working in the United States, provides art supplies to artists in Russia and Eastern Europe, and publishes books on art. It is a US-based public foundation (501(c)(3) status).

== The Kolodzei Collection of Russian and Eastern European Art ==
The Kolodzei Art Foundation often utilizes the artistic resources of the Kolodzei Collection of Russian and Eastern European Art. The Kolodzei Collection of Russian and Eastern European Art is now one of the world's largest private art collections, containing over 7,000 works by over 300 artists, including paintings, sculptures, prints, photographs and videos, all from Russia and the former Soviet Union from the 1950s through today. The Collection was started by Tatiana Kolodzei in Moscow during the late 1960s at the height of the Cold War. In 2006, the Kolodzei Collection of Russian and Eastern European Art was recognized by Art and Antiques Magazine as one of the top 100 collectors in the United States (Art and Antiques, March 2006, pp. 101–102).

There are now over 300 artists in the Kolodzei Collection of Russian and Eastern European Art. The Collection includes works by such well known artists of the 1960s and 1970s as Ilya Kabakov, Komar and Melamid, Eduard Shteinberg, Vladimir Nemukhin, Pyotr Belenok, Erik Bulatov, Ivan Chuikov, Francisco Infante, Viacheslav Koleichuk, Bela Levikova, Mikhail Shvartsman, Oleg Vassiliev, Vladimir Yankilevsky, Leonid Lamm, Valeri Yurlov, Dmitri Krasnopevtsev, Anatoly Zverev, Eduard Gorokhovsky, Dmitri Plavinsky, Rimma Gerlovina and Valeriy Gerlovin, Vladimir Yakovlev , Ernst Neizvestny, Natalya Nesterova, and many others. There are artists of the 1980s and 1990s such as Igor Novikov, Andrei Budaev, Shimon Okshteyn, Dimitry Gerrman, Farid Bogdalov, Asya Dodina, Slava Polishchuk, Olga Bulgakova, Valerii and Natasha Cherkashin, Irina Danilova, Genia Chef, Leonid Borisov, Andrei Karpov, Evgenii Gorokhovskii, Sergei Volokhov, Valery Koshlyakov, Sergei Mironenko, Andrei Filipov, Semen Agroskin, Mamut Churlu, Tatiana Antoshina, and others.

== Founders ==
Tatiana Kolodzei, along with supporters from the US and Europe (including Norton Dodge), formed the Kolodzei Art Foundation shortly before the collapse of the Soviet Union in 1991. Tatiana's daughter, Natalia Kolodzei (an Honorary Member of the Russian Academy of Arts), is the Executive Director. Robb Report called Natalia Kolodzei "the person to know" regarding Russian art, and "one of the most influential of Russia's young cultural figures." In 2015, Natalia Kolodzei was featured in The Robb 50 Connoisseurs: Art; Robb Report, October 2015.

== Selected exhibitions ==
(either by the Kolodzei Art Foundation or featuring works from the Kolodzei Collection of Russian and Eastern European Art)

Personal Spaces – Interactive Multimedia Works by Anna Frants, Carla Gannis, Alexandra Dementieva, Elena Gubanova and Ivan Govorkov. National Arts Club, 15 Gramercy Park South, New York, 2018.

This Leads to Fire: Russian Art from Non-Conformism to Global Capitalism. Selections from the Kolodzei Art Foundation, Neuberger Museum of Art, Purchase College, Purchase, NY, September 14, 2014 to January 11, 2015.

Finding Freedom in Russian Art, 1961-2014. Selections from the Kolodzei Art Foundation and the Collection of Dr. Wayne F. Yakes. Paul and Lulu Hilliard University Art Museum, University of Louisiana at Lafayette, Lafayette, LA, 2014.

Concerning the Spiritual In Russian Art, 1965-2011. Selections from the Kolodzei Art Foundation. The Museum of Russian Art, Minneapolis, Minnesota, 2013.

Concerning the Spiritual Tradition in Russian Art. Selections from the Kolodzei Art Foundation Collection of Russian and Eastern European Art. Curated by Natalia Kolodzei. Chelsea Art Museum - Home of Miotte Foundation, New York, 2011

Not Toys?! State Tretyakov Gallery in conjunction with 3rd Moscow Biennale) 2009

From Non-Conformism to Feminisms: Russian Women Artists from the Kolodzei Art Foundation. Chelsea Art Museum - Home of the Miotte Foundation, New York 2008

Moscow - New York = Parallel Play. From the Kolodzei Art Foundation Collection of Russian and Eastern European Art. National Center for Contemporary Art (NCCA), 2007, and Chelsea Art Museum - Home of the Miotte Foundation, New York, 2008

Olga Bulgakova and Alexander Sitnikov. Paintings. Objects. State Tretyakov Gallery, Moscow, 2007

Shimon Okshteyn. Dialogue with Objects. Contemporary Art Center MARS and State Russian Museum, Saint Petersburg 2007

Vadim Voinov. The State Hermitage under a Full Moon. The State Hermitage Museum, St. Petersburg, 2005-2006

Works on Paper: Soviet and Russian Art 1955-2005 from the Kolodzei Collection of Russian and Eastern European Art. Brooklyn College of the City University of New York, Brooklyn, New York, 2006

Historic MADI: Its Roots. Artists from Russia through Uruguay to Argentina in 20th Century. MADI Museum, Dallas, Texas, 2006

Moscow Grafika: Artists' Prints 1961 – 2005. Selections from the Kolodzei Collection of Russian and Eastern European Art. International Print Center New York, 2005. The exhibition was also presented during Russian Nights Festival in Los Angeles 2006.

Perestroika + 20: Selections from the Kolodzei Collection of Russian and Eastern European Art. Harriman Institute, Columbia University, New York. 2005-2006.

Young American Artists of Today. Festival of American Contemporary Culture American Autumn in Moscow. Central House of Artists, Moscow, 2005 and Bergen Museum of Art and Science, Paramus, New Jersey. 2006 (article NYT, January 29, 2006).

Finding Freedom: Forty Years of Soviet and Russian Art. Bergen Museum of Art and Science, Paramus, NJ and Leepa-Rattner Museum of Art, Tarpon Springs, Florida. 2004.

Oleg Vassiliev: Memory Speaks (Themes and Variations). State Tretyakov Gallery, Moscow, and the State Russian Museum, St. Petersburg, Russia 2004-2005.

Dmitri Plavinsky—A Retrospective: Paintings, Works on Paper and Installations. State Tretyakov Gallery, Moscow. 2004

The Kolodzei Art Foundation lent artworks to the exhibition Abstract Art XXth Century, State Russian Museum, St. Petersburg, Russia. 2001-2002

Hurricane of Time: Selections from the Kolodzei Collection Villa Ormond, Sanremo, Italy. 2000

Works on Paper: Selections from the Kolodzei Collection, Oklahoma Art Center, Oklahoma City. 1994, Long Island University, Brooklyn, NY (1999), Bergen Museum of Art (2000)

100 Artists from Tatiana & Natalia Kolodzei Collection, State Museum of Fine Arts of Uzbekistan in Tashkent. 1989

== Publications featuring the Kolodzei Art Collection ==
- Moscow - New York = Parallel Play. From the Kolodzei Art Foundation Collection of Russian and Eastern European Art. Edited by Natalia Kolodzei. 2007. ISBN 978-0981519500.
- Shimon Okshteyn. Dialogue with Objects. Introduction by Evgenia Petrova and essays by Charlotta Kotik, Donald Kuspit, José Pierre, Natalia Kolodzei, and Jenifer Borum. Palace Editions, 2006. ISBN 978-3-938051-80-1
- Vadim Voinov. The State Hermitage under a Full Moon. St. Petersburg: State Hermitage Museum, 2005.
- Oleg Vassiliev: Memory Speaks (Themes and Variations). General Editor: Natalia Kolodzei, with essays by Amei Wallach, Andrew Solomon, Natalia Kolodzei, Ilya Kabakov, Eric Bulatov, Victor and Margarita Tupitsyn, and Oleg Vassiliev. Published by Palace Editions, the State Russian Museum and the Kolodzei Art Foundation, in collaboration with the State Tretyakov Gallery. ISBN 0-9754829-2-0.
- The Hurricane of Time. Turn of the Century, Close of the Millennium. Selections from the Kolodzei Collection of Russian and Eastern European Art (1960 - 2000). Essays by Tatiana Kolodzei, Natalia Kolodzei, Alison Hilton, Valery Turchin, Enrico Crispolti. ISBN 0-9754829-0-4
- Olga Bulgakova (ISBN 9780975482964) and Alexander Sitnikov (ISBN 9780975482988) Including essays by Alexander Borovsky, Barbara Thiemann, Natalia Kolodzei, Alexander Rozhin and Natalia Sitnikova. Moscow: Knigi WAM, 2007
- The "Art Constitution", the Illustrated Constitution of the Russian Federation. Editors: Sergey Denisov, Ivan Kolesnikov, and Peter Voice, with essays by Zurab Tsereteli, Natalia Kolodzei, Ekaterina Dyogot, and Irina Kulik Moscow: Alpha-Press, in collaboration with the Moscow Museum of Modern Art and the Kolodzei Art Foundation, Inc. ISBN 0-9754829-1-2.
- Sergey Kalinin and Farid Bogdalov: Session of the Federal Assembly. Moscow, 2004. ISBN 0-9754829-3-9.

== See also ==
- Norton Dodge
- Norton and Nancy Dodge Collection of Soviet Nonconformist Art
- Ilya Kabakov
- Irina Nakhova
- Oleg Vassiliev (painter)
- Moscow Museum of Modern Art
- Bulldozer Exhibition
- Soviet Nonconformist Art
- Afrika (artist)
