= Dimitry Gerrman =

- Born: March 10, 1955 (age 71) Gomel, USSR
- Occupation: Artist, sculptor

Dimitry Gerrman (March 10, 1955–) is an American artist and sculptor of Belarusian origin.

== Biography ==
=== Early life ===
In 1974 Gerrman graduated from Glebov Art College in Minsk. From 1975 to 1979, he worked on commissioned projects and exhibited his work throughout the USSR. In 1985 he graduated from the Department of Sculpture of the Mukhina Academy of Art and Design in St. Petersburg, Russia.

In 1989, he emigrated to the United States and resided in Baltimore until 1999. He exhibited with other Baltimore artists, such as Izya Shlosberg, Elena Zolotnitsky, and Noi Volkov.

=== Art career ===
In 1994 his sculpture Crying Violin became the International Holocaust Remembrance Award which was presented to Steven Spielberg for his movie Schindler's List. In 1996 Germann became a member of the National Sculpture Society.

In 2000 he moved to the New York City area and continues to exhibit his work nationwide and internationally. He has participated in exhibitions with Alexander Ney, Leonid Sokov, Ernst Neizvestny, and Mihail Chemiakin.

He is currently represented by Wally Findlay Galleries. His work can be found in museums and public collections such as The State Russian Museum in St. Petersburg, Russia, Zimmerli Art Museum at Rutgers University, and the Kolodzei Art Foundation, United States. His sculptures can be found in private collections in the United States, France, Japan, England, China, Germany, Russia, Brazil, Israel, Switzerland and Venezuela, including those of Yevgeny Yevtushenko, Jennifer Lopez, Simon Cowell, Janusz Kaminski, and Senator Barbara Mikulski.

== Awards ==
2006 National Sculpture Award for Non-Traditional Sculpture

== Publications ==
=== Magazines ===
- Zacharias, Johanna. Seven Soviet Dreamers in The Land of the Free. Jewish Times. Baltimore, May 18, 1990.
- Greenberg, Melinda. Fiddling Around. Jewish Times. Baltimore, December 5, 1994.
- Slack, Susan Joy. NSS Honors New Members with Exhibition. Sculpture Review. New York. Fall 1997, ISSN 0747-5284.
- House & Garden. April 2001.
- Nobel, Philip. An Arresting Development. Architectural Digest. February 2003.
- Kolodzei, Tatiana and Natalia. Our Collection. Sobranie #2, Moscow, June 2006, ISSN 1811-9395.
- Vencil Sanchez, Kelly. Graceful Juxtaposition. Architectural Digest. November 2007.
- Palm Beach Cottages & Gardens. March 2007.
- Cutler, Ellen B. Music and Sculpture: A Survey. Sculpture Review. New York, Winter 2008 ISSN 0747-5284.
- Canvas. Volume 6 Issue 2. March/April 2010 Dubai ISSN 1814-7062.

=== Books ===
- Browning, Dominique. House & Garden Book of Style. New York. Clarkson Potter. 2001 ISBN 0-609-60928-9.
- Siegel. Gwathmey. Buildings and Projects 1992–2002. Rizzoli, 2003, ISBN 0-8478-2529-9.
- Collage in Russia XX Century. Palace Edition 2005, ISBN 3-938051-40-X.
- Dimitry Gerrman Poetry of Form. Palace Edition 2009, ISBN 978-3-940761-51-4

=== Selected exhibition catalogues ===
- Annual Report 2001. The State Russian Museum. St. Petersburg. Palace Edition. 2001, ISBN 3-935298-21-8.
- Twosome. The State Russian Museum. St. Petersburg. Palace Edition. 2002, ISBN 3-935298-40-4.
- Wally Findlay Galleries, Dimitry Gerrman Exhibition Catalogue, September 2004, New York.
- National Sculpture Society 73 Annual Exhibition Catalogue, New York 2006–2007.
- Toyamura International Sculpture Biennale. Exhibition Catalogue, Sep.22 – Oct.21, 2007, Toyako Town, Japan.
- The Poetry of Water in Russian Art. Palace Edition Europe 2007, ISBN 978-3-938051-85-6.
- Il Balletto Russo. Palace Editions Europe. 2008, ISBN 978-3-940761-17-0.
- The Power of Water, State Russian Museum, Palace Editions Europe, 2008, ISBN 978-3-940761-18-7.
- Biennale Wasser, Bad Breisig, Germany 2009.
- Wally Findlay Galleries, Dimitry Gerrman Poetry of Form, March -April 2010, New York.
- Wally Findlay Galleries, Dimitry Gerrman Body of Work, June – July 2010, Palm Beach.
- The Sky in Art, State Russian Museum, Palace Edition 2010, ISBN 978-3-940761-81-1
- L'arte Contemporanea in Russia, 1950–2011, December 2011 – January 2012, Fondi, Italy
