= Izya Shlosberg =

Belarusian-American painter and writer

- Born: Izya Movchavich Shlosberg; November 4, 1950 (age 75) Pinsk, Byelorussian SSR, Soviet Union (now Belarus)
- Occupation: Writer, artist, philosopher
- Genre: Science fiction
- Spouse: Mariya Shlosberg
- Children: Matt Shlosberg; Vlad Shlosberg

Izya Shlosberg (born November 4, 1950) is an American artist, writer and philosopher, well known for expressing his philosophical and scientific ideas through his paintings.

Born in 1950 in Pinsk, Belarus, Izya moved to the United States in 1994 and quickly became known in the New York and Baltimore art circles for his unique style and ability to express himself through his work. Through his art, Izya Shlosberg attempts to teach others about the world and its many unknowns.

With his complex, three-dimensional works, Shlosberg encourages those who view them "to think outside the box and then outside of that box".

In 1999, Izya Shlosberg began to write novels, mostly describing thoughts behind his philosophical concepts. Some of the topics of interest to him included communications and understanding between living and "accepted as living" things, combination of mechanical and creative processes, a two way communication between the creator and his product, and others.

When he began writing, Shlosberg created the idea that modern art pieces represent a specific complex product, rather than paintings. Specifically, he combined art and literature into one whole piece that tells a story. According to him, this inspiration came from him after he read history of art, referring to many well-known artists as writers.

Shlosberg's paintings don't illustrate what his novels say and his novels don't repeat the story of his paintings. Although both objects are independent of one another, the combination of them creates a multidimensional, emotional, complex product. According to him, not only does this combination cause complex visual effects, but also creative ones.

In 2002 he created an international club of multi-talented people, Shiva-club, which includes about 100 artists, authors, musicians, including such as artists as E. Zolotnitsky, D. Gerrman, G. Gurvich (USA), S. Zhilevich (Belarus), E. Berezin, A. Cherkasov (Russia), S. Livni (Israel), etc.), authors (P. Amnuel (Israel), M. Gelprin (USA), J. Gavrilenko, M. Drobkov (Russia), V. Yatsenko (Ukraine), etc., poets E. Sosnina, A. Gabriel, V. Zubareva, B. Kokotov, B. Vershov, Y. Braginsky (USA), F. Zorin (Israel), T. Borinevich, M. Pavlova, N. Tkachenko (Russia), etc., and musicians (P. Slutsky, N. Slutsky, B. Rookard (USA), O. Venger (Belarus), etc.).

== Books ==
The Custodian. (ISBN 978-0-9791791-1-2) Seagull Press. This book includes a novel called "The Four Horsemen of the Apocalypses", two long stories, and a collection of short stories. All stories in the book are united by a common philosophical discussion about lives of non-human forms across several dimensions and worlds, including the human world. He shows that communications with those dimensions and worlds are impossible due to human's mental and biological limitations.

Grey Zone. (ISBN 978-1442173798) Hanna Concern Publishing. This book includes a large novel as well as a collection of shorter novels. This book continues the philosophical discussion about lives of non-human forms started in the previous book. The author introduces an idea of a complex product represented by a combination of art and literature. Both components can exist independently. However, they create a new meaning when combined.

Light Behind The Back. (ISBN 978-1448617128) Hanna Concern Publishing. This book includes a large collection of short stories united by a common theme – existence of the non-human world. Species living in this world are unable to communicate with humans because they live in different dimensions, times, and systems of coordinates or simply have a communications mechanism different from that of humans.

Transcending Images. (ISBN 978-1448690978) Hanna Concern Publishing. Co-written with [Boris Kokotov], this book includes a collection of poems and paintings. Paintings don't talk about poems and poems don't describe the paintings, but each set of paintings and poems talks about the same subject, describing it in different ways.

Set of poems. (ISBN 978-1461050797) Hanna Concern Publishing. This book contents poems written by author after 1998.

Four Horsemen of the Apocalypse. (ISBN 978-1461116622) Hanna Concern Publishing. This book includes a collection of short novels and stories.

Tail of Var. (ISBN 978-1467959667) Hanna Concern Publishing. This book includes many sci-fi stories with humor.

Yes and No (ISBN 978-1475078695) Hanna Concern Publishing. This book includes a philosophical novel and set of stories.

Equilibrium (ISBN 978-1492704782) Hanna Concern Publishing. Co-written with [Alex Gabriel], this book includes a collection of poems and paintings.

City without armrests (ISBN 978-1501007194) Hanna Concern Publishing. Co-written with [Julia Drabkin], this book includes a collection of poems and paintings.

Dance with daughter (ISBN 978-1502952134) Hanna Concern Publishing. Co-written with [Barry Vershov], this book includes a collection of poems and paintings.

By the time you come, we will be gone (ISBN 978-1502983039) Hanna Concern Publishing. This book includes a philosophical novel and set of stories.

All listed books illustrated by author.
