= Natalya Nesterova =

Russian painter (1944–2022)

Natalya Igorevna Nesterova (Russian: Ната́лья И́горевна Не́стерова; 1944–2022) was a Russian artist who was an academician with the Russian Academy of Fine Arts. Her work has been described as "strik[ing] the kind of delicate balance between the real and surreal which can evoke a feeling that something is not quite right even before one has the chance to figure out why". Because her works were painted "in a figurative primitivist manner while often depicting grotesque imagery, Nesterova was sometimes accused of undermining the foundations of Russian professional artistic training".

== Biography ==
Nesterova was born on April 23, 1944, in Moscow. Her parents Igor Smirnov and Zoya Nesterova were architects. Her first exhibition was with a young artists' group in 1966. She graduated from the Surikov Art Institute in 1968, after which she became a professor at the Russian Academy of Theatre Arts. In 1969, she became a member of the Artists' Union of the USSR.

Nesterova's first solo exhibition was held at the Artists' House on Kuznetsky Bridge in 1974. After traveling to New York City for an exhibition at the Hal Bromm Gallery in 1988, she spent much of her life between Russia and the United States. Her first exhibition in Chicago occurred in 1991, followed by an exhibition in Madrid in 1992. During her career, she received the Russian National Award in Fine Art and was named an academician with the Russian Academy of Fine Arts, among other honors.

She had one son, Lev. She also cared for her grandson, David Nesterov-Rappoport.

Fearing retaliation from the Russian government due to her criticism of the invasion of Ukraine, Nesterova settled in the United States in 2022. She died on August 10, 2022, in New York.

== Selected solo exhibitions ==
- 1990: Recent works from Moscow». Hal Bromm Gallery, New York
- 1992: Retrospective. Musée des beaux-arts de Montréal
- 2002: Russian Wanderings. Traveling exhibition. Lehman College Art Gallery, New York (cat). 2004: Natalya Nesterova. Reflections of Time Past. State Russian Museum . St. Peterburg (monograph).
- 2005: Summer Impressions. The National Museum of Women in the Arts, Washington, DC.
- 2023: Counterpoint. Hal Bromm Gallery, New York
- 2024: The Creative Journey. Selections from the Kolodzei Art Foundation. The Harriman Institute, International Affairs Building, Columbia University, NYC

== Selected group exhibitions ==
- 2005: Russia! Solomon R. Guggenheim Museum, New York (cat.)

== Selected public collections ==
Nesterova's works are in many public collections, including the following:

- China National Museum of Fine Arts (Beijing)
- Jewish Museum (New York)
- Kolodzei Art Foundation
- Ludwig Forum Museum for International Art (Aachen)
- Montreal Museum of Fine Arts (Montreal)
- Moscow Museum of Modern Art (Moscow)
- Museum of Contemporary Art (Budapest)
- National Museum of Women in the Arts (Washington, DC)
- Russian Museum (St. Petersburg)
- Solomon R. Guggenheim Museum (New York)
- Tretyakov Gallery (Moscow)
- Zimmerli Art Museum at Rutgers University (New Jersey)
