= George Costakis =

Greek-Russian art collector (1913–1990)

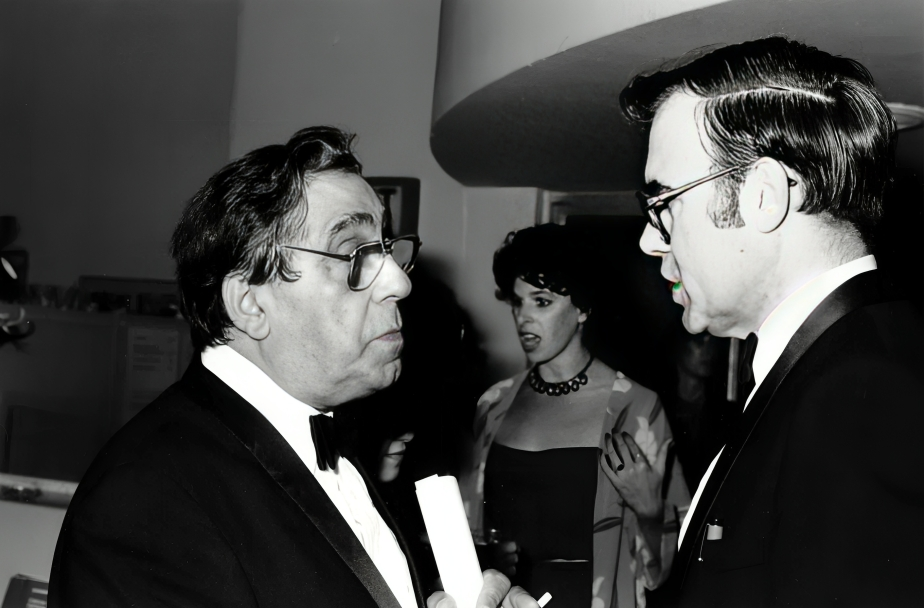
- George Costakis (left)
- Born: 5 July 1913; Moscow, Russia
- Died: 9 March 1990 (aged 76)
- Occupation: art collector

George Costakis (Russian: Георгий Дионисович Костаки, Greek: Γεώργιος Κωστάκης, 5 July 1913 - 9 March 1990) was a Greek-Russian art collector who amassed one of the largest private collections of Russian avant-garde art in the world.

In the years surrounding the 1917 revolution, artists in Russia produced the first non-figurative art, which was to become the defining art of the 20th century. Costakis by chance discovered some constructivist paintings in a Moscow studio in 1946, and he went on to search for the revolutionary art which might otherwise have been lost to the world.

== Family history ==
Born in Moscow of affluent Greek parents, George Costakis had no artistic education but developed an interest in art during his adolescence and as soon as he was able to, he began buying art. At first he worked as a driver for the Greek Embassy until 1939, when relationships between Russia and Greece broke down due to the Molotov–Ribbentrop Pact. After that he took up work as Head of Personnel for the Canadian Embassy.

His work at the Canadian Embassy brought him into contact with many visiting diplomats and he would show them around the Moscow art galleries and antique shops.

== The Russian Revolution and art ==
From the 1860s an art-buying middle class in Moscow had ensured an interest in and a market for Impressionist, Symbolist and Art Nouveau works produced in Russia and the rest of Europe. 'Culture' and collecting paintings had been a long established essential for the wealthy citizen of Moscow (Gray).

In the early years of the 20th century the cultural and political climate of Europe as a whole was in a state of change with a cross-fertilisation of ideas across national boundaries. Many French cubist and Italian futurist works were being brought into Russia and exhibited.

== Stalinism ==
At first the Bolshevik Revolution under the leadership of Vladimir Lenin supported the new abstract art but from 1920 onwards the freedom of artists in Russia was increasingly curtailed. Many artists wanted their work to contribute to the creation of a new society whilst others, for example the Suprematists continued to work independently.

Lenin died in 1924 and Joseph Stalin who succeeded him as leader of the Communist Party of the Soviet Union, brought about another art ideology. In 1932 socialist realism became the official state policy. It was within this political environment that Costakis experienced the development, suppression and final disintegration of the older art culture in Russia.

== The Costakis Collection ==
At first Costakis had collected the Masters of the Dutch School of Landscape Painters but modernist works by Pablo Picasso and Henri Matisse soon became his main subject, then in 1946 he came across three paintings in a Moscow studio by Olga Rozanova . He described how, in the dark days after the war these brightly coloured paintings of the lost Avant-Garde:

"... were signals to me. I did not care what it was... but nobody knew what anything was in those days." (Chatwin, 1977)

He was struck by the visual effect of the strong colour and bold geometric design, that he was determined to rediscover the Suprematist and Constructivist art which had been lost and forgotten in the attics, studios and basements of Moscow and Leningrad.

He hunted for 'lost' pictures, some that were rolled up and covered with dust. He met Vladimir Tatlin and befriended Varvara Stepanova. He tracked down friends of Kasimir Malevich and bought works by Liubov Popova and Ivan Kliun. He particularly admired Anatoly Zverev, Russian expressionist whom he met in the 1950s. Costakis said about Zverev "it was a source of great happiness for me to come into contact with this wonderful artist, and I believe him to be one of the most talented artists in Soviet Russia."

By the 1960 the apartment of George Costakis in Moscow had become a meeting place for international art collectors and art lovers in general: Russia's unofficial Museum of Modern Art. The 'détente' period following the signing of the Paris Peace Accords in 1973 opened up Russia once again to international cultural exchanges the first of which was the showing of the Costakis Collection in Düsseldorf in 1977.

The same year Costakis, with his family, left the Soviet Union and moved to Greece, but there was an agreement that he should leave 50 per cent of his collection in the State Tretyakov Gallery of Moscow. In 1997 the Greek State bought the remaining 1,275 works. They are now a part of the permanent collection of the State Museum of Contemporary Art, in Thessaloniki, Greece.
