= Erik Bulatov =

Russian artist (1933–2025)

- Эрик Булатов
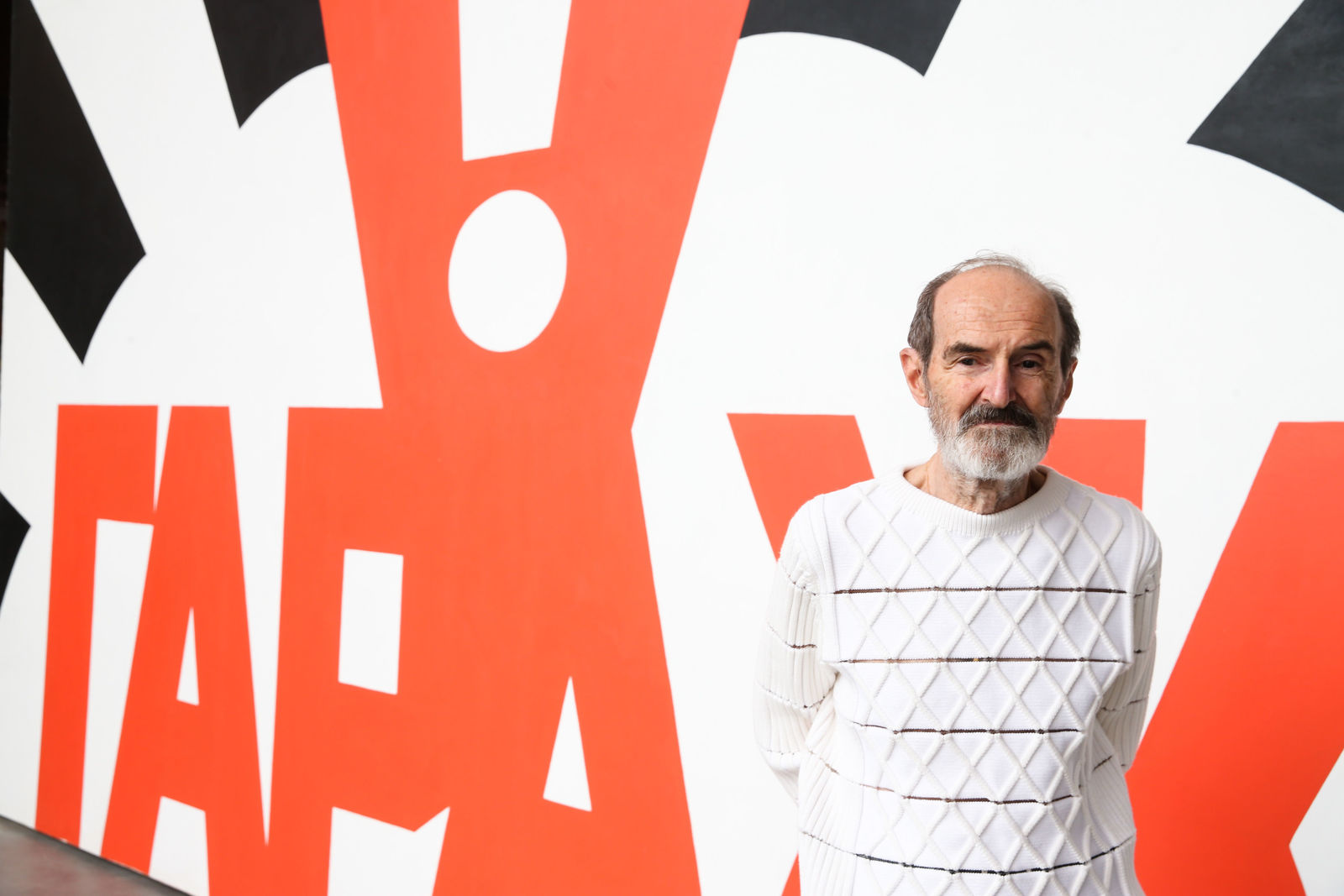
- Bulatov in 2018
- Born: 5 September 1933; Sverdlovsk,Russia
- Died: 9 November 2025 (aged 92)
- Education: Moscow Surikov Institute
- Occupation: Artist
- Awards: Ordre des Arts et des Lettres; Order of Friendship

Erik Vladimirovich Bulatov (Russian: Эрик Владимирович Булатов; 5 September 1933 – 9 November 2025) was a Russian artist who was raised in Moscow. His father was a communist party official who died in World War II at Pskov, and his mother emigrated from Białystok, Poland at age 15 in 1922. Bulatov's works are in the major public and private collections in Europe, Russia, and United States. In 2008, Bulatov became an honorary member of the Russian Academy of Arts. In 2015, he was made the Chevalier des Arts et des Lettres.

== Early life ==
=== Education ===
Bulatov was born in Sverdlovsk to Vladimir Borisovich Bulatov (1901-1944) and Raisa Pavlovna Shvarts (1907–1986), a stenographer. He studied painting at the Surikov Art Institute in Moscow, graduating in 1958. He began working as a children’s book illustrator with friend and collaborator, Oleg Vassiliev for which he won numerous awards. Both artists were immensely influenced by Robert Falk and Vladimir Favorsky two artists of the early-twentieth century Russian avant-garde.

=== Sretensky Boulevard Group ===
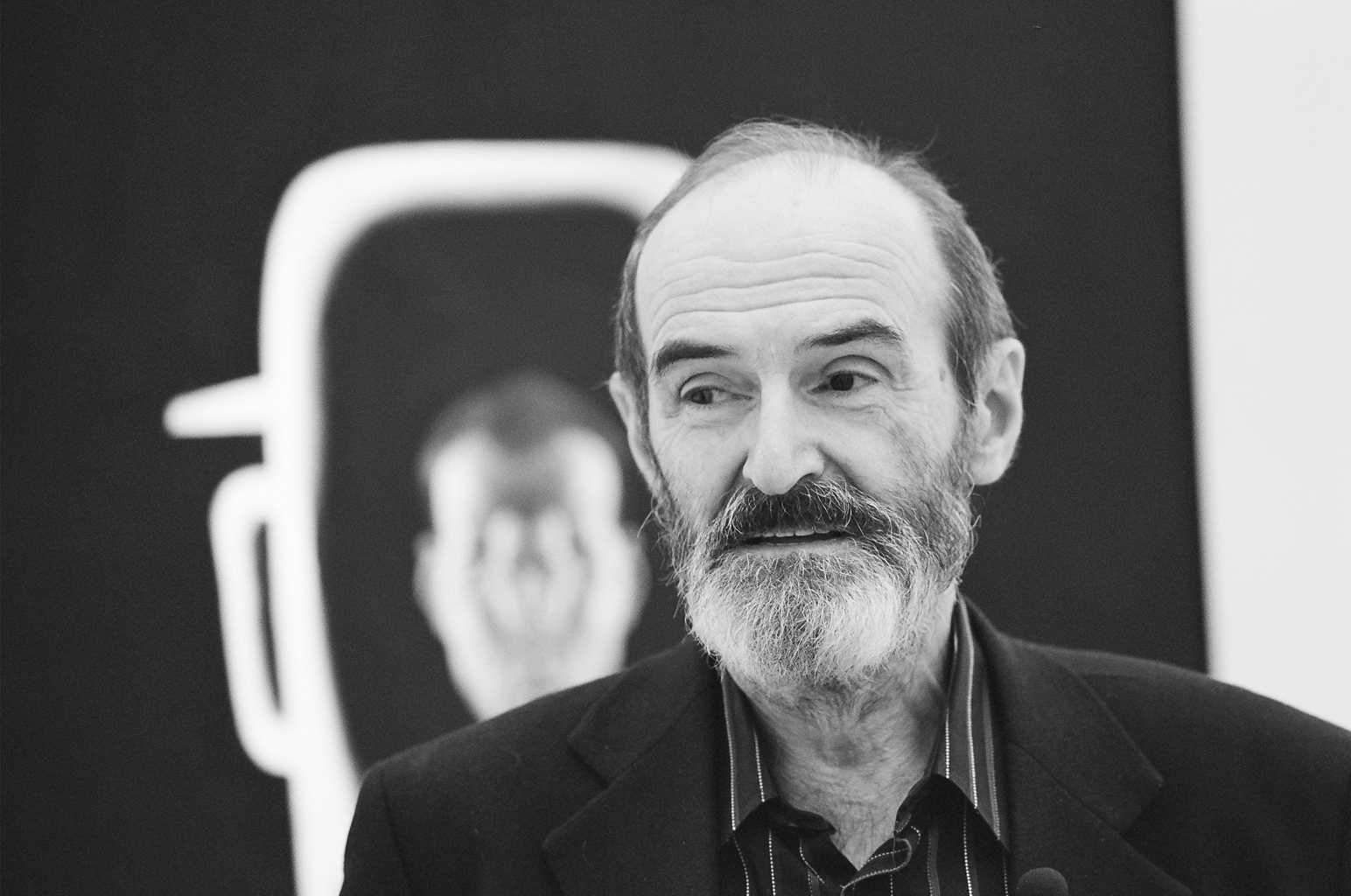
Bulatov in 2006

In the 1960s, Bulatov formed the Sretensky Boulevard Group with Ilya Kabakov, Edik Steinberg, Oleg Vassiliev, Vladimir Yankilevsky, and Viktor Pivovarov. Named so by the Czech art critic and historian Jindřich Chalupecký for the block on which they lived, the group often met at Kabakov's to discuss and show their work as they were not permitted to do so in "official" settings. This group was more of an association of like-minded artists rather than a school with similar stylistic tendencies.

Through the Sretensky Boulevard Group, Bulatov became a prominent member of the loosely affiliated Moscow Conceptualists. This group, related ideologically rather than stylistically, has defined the "Moscow School" of contemporary Russian art as it is known today.

== Style ==
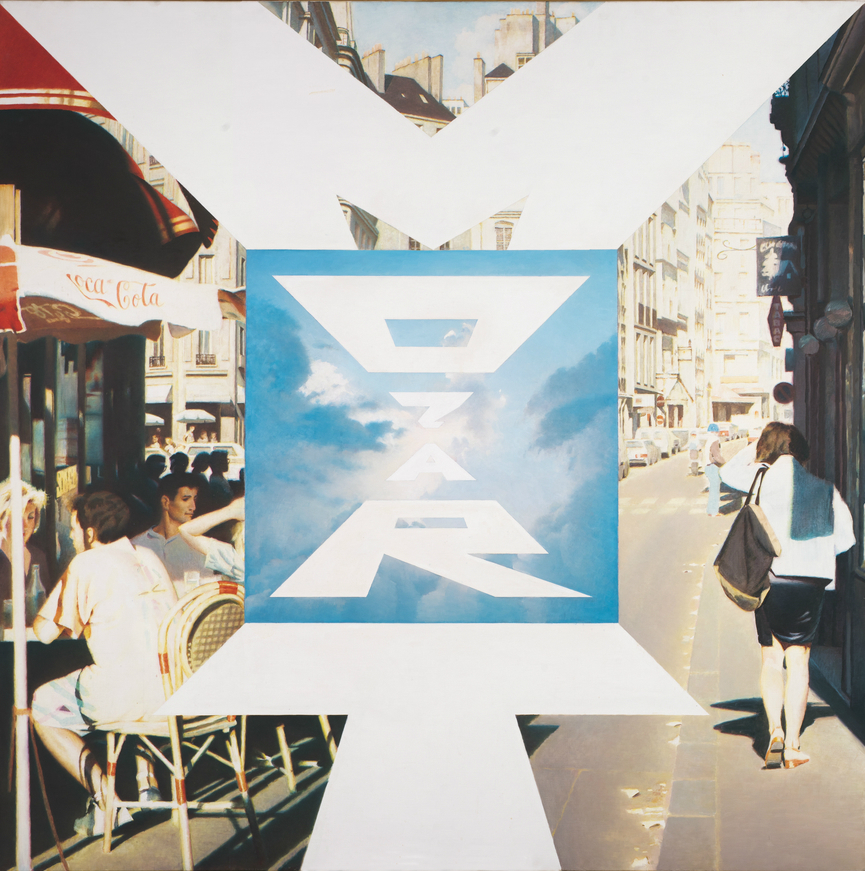
"Mozart", 1991

It is thought that Bulatov worked in sots art style. "Bulatov's paintings are large, colorful, realistic images of landscapes, skies, urban settings, and people, many of which are painted over and partially obscured by wry words or phrases. Metaphorically rich and poetic blue skies are overlaid with Russian texts that translate: 'Glory to the U.S.S.R.' or 'Trademark'. Lush, green landscapes toil under the labels 'Not To Be Leaned On' or 'Caution.' But Bulatov in one of his later interviews indicated that he had nothing to do with Sots Art. Sots Art according Bulatov is an irony. And irony is absent in his work.

Bulatov's subject matter is broad. Equally broad was his perception of the government's role in the classification and control of everything. Bulatov symbolized the government through his use of language as a system of order and control, the foundation of written law and constraint which he then plastered on every tree and rock. It is in this sense that Bulatov's paintings may take on a more universal accuracy and a more populist appeal. His emphasis on only the public and external aspects of life--the street, the land, the State television broadcast--reinforces the notion that one's thoughts and feelings are (still) one's own. the psychological and emotional are beyond the confines of words, language and law."

== Career ==
Erik Bulatov was later in life represented by ARNDT Berlin, SKOPIA Geneva and pop/off/art gallery Moscow – Berlin.

== Death ==
Bulatov died in Paris on 9 November 2025, at the age of 92.

== Personal life ==
Erik Bulatov was married three times.

- First wife Irina Shimonovna Lukashevich (1930–2019) was an artist and worked as a costume designer at Mosfilm. His son, Vladimir Erikovich Bulatov (born 1960), holds a PhD in Geographical Sciences and is the head of the cartography department at the Historical Museum in Moscow.
- Second wife Svetlana Georgievna Leviatova, with whom they had a son Alexey Erikovich Bulatov (born 1962), a professor at the International Institute of Economics and Finance at the Higher School of Economics (Moscow).
- Third wife is Natalya Sergeevna Godzina (born 1943), a ballet critic, widow of avant-garde poet and critic Mikhail Sokovnin (1938-1975), who married Bulatov in 1978 and remained his wife till the end of Bulatov’s life.

== Public collections ==
- The State Russian Museum, St. Petersburg, Russia
- The State Tretyakov Gallery, Moscow, Russia
- The State Hermitage Museum, St. Petersburg, Russia
- The Solomon R. Guggenheim Museum, New York, United States
- Centre Georges Pompidou, Paris, France
- The Garage Museum of Contemporary Art, Moscow, Russia
- The Moscow Museum of Modern Art (MMoMA), Moscow, Russia
- The National Centre for Contemporary Arts, Moscow, Russia
- The ART4.RU Museum of Contemporary Russian Art, Moscow, Russia
- The Jane Voorhees Zimmerli Art Museum at Rutgers University, United States
- The Nasher Museum of Art at Duke University, United States

== Sources ==
- Matthias Arndt (ed.): Erik Bulatov. Paintings 1952-2011. Catalogue raisonné in two volumes, volume 1. Compiled by Kristin Rieber. With an essay by Yevgeny Barabanov. Wienand, Cologne 2011, ISBN 978-3-86832-073-2. Russian/English.
- Erik Bulatov. Paris: Centre Georges Pompidou, 1988. ISBN 2-85850-475-X
- Erik Boulatov. Dina Vierny Foundation, Paris: Musee Maillol, 2000.
- Erik Bulatov Oleg Vassiliev. New York: Phyllis Kind Gallery, 1991.
- Bulatov, Erik and Oleg Vassiliev, illustrators. The Mitten: A Ukrainian Fairy Tale, Moscow: Malysh Publishers, 1979.
- Erik Bulatov: Freedom Is Freedom. DAP, 2007. ISBN 3-938025-70-0.
- Erik Bulatov. That's It. Moscow: Knigi WAM, 2006 (in Russian and English). ISBN 5-91002-013-7.
- Jolles, Claudia et al. Erik Bulatov: Moscow, Zürich and London: Parkett and ICA, 1989. ISBN 3-907509-03-X
