= Anatoly Zverev =

Russian painter

- Anatoly Zverev in 1980
- Born: Анатолий Тимофеевич Зверев; November 3, 1931; Moscow, Russia
- Died: December 9, 1986 (aged 55); Moscow, Russia
- Known for: Painting
- Movement: Tachisme

Anatoly (Anatoli) Timofeevich Zverev Russian: Анатолий Тимофеевич Зверев (November 3, 1931 – December 9, 1986) was a Russian artist, a member of the non-conformist movement and a founder of Russian Expressionism in the 1960s. He spent all of his life in Moscow.

He did not have a solo show in Russia until shortly before his death in 1986 and his work was exhibited in small, underground galleries. Throughout his career he was harassed and persecuted by the Soviet authorities especially as his international success grew.

== Work ==
His style of tachisme can be compared with the work of the American Abstract Expressionist painter Jackson Pollock. His work was based on deep philosophical convictions, particularly the idea of momentalism, that everything is in constant change. His intention was to render direct sensations, and he worked at great speed.

== Early life ==
Zverev was born in Moscow. His grandfather was an icon painter. His father was a war invalid and died when Tolya was a little boy. His mother, a cleaner and manual labourer, brought up the family of three children on her own. Throughout Zverev's childhood the family endured extreme poverty. For example, he was sent to school wearing unmatching shoes. In order to bring more money into the family he took a job at a recreation park, painting fences and boards. It was there that he started to paint images from fairy tales.

== International success and persecution at home ==
George Costakis by Anatoly Zverev, late 1950s

An art-lover called Rumnev noticed his work and introduced him to the famous art collector George Costakis. Costakis later said that Anatoly was "one of the most talented artists in Soviet Russia... a unique phenomenon". Costakis brought his work to the attention of the West. He was fired from the recreational park because the director saw him using a mop for his paintings "against the regulations".

A Zverev self-portrait was featured in the March 28, 1960, issue of LIFE beside a portrait of Vladimir Lenin by the Soviet artist Vladimir Serov (1910–1968) to contrast the underground with the official art of Russia. When Nikita Khrushchev learned about the publication he was outraged and forbade all contacts with Western visitors and closed down all semi-legal exhibitions. Zverev was the main target of his outrage, forcing him into hiding. From time to time he disappeared and the rumours of his death began to spread about Moscow. Each time the rumours were not justified. "They have stumbled on me again" he used to say. He never complained and made jokes: "I am not a communist, I am a harmonist."

As a result of his persecution at the hands of the authorities, he surrounded himself with a small group of friends who would be able to support him. He lived a hand-to-mouth existence, never knowing where he would spend the next night. He was indifferent to material values and always wore shabby clothing.

== Personality ==
Zverev was not easy to get to know. His language was metaphorical, his manner was sometimes provocative and he suffered from mental instability. However, he was also a serious thinker and observer. Those in his circle used to say, "When the Lord anointed us artists for our profession, He poured a whole cup of oil on Tolya's head".

== Death ==
Thousands attended his funeral in 1986 to pay their last respects. After his death there was a major retrospective exhibition for several months in the major art museum of Moscow. The exhibition had to be extended as people were queuing up to get inside around the clock.

== Exhibitions and collectors ==
Since 1957, Zverev participated in over eighty group exhibitions in museums and galleries around the world. His work are in many prominent collections in Russia, Europe and United States.

== Other sources ==
- Hurricane of Time: 1960-2000, Selection from the Kolodzei Collection of Russian and Eastern European Art. SanRemo, Italy. Exhibition catalogue. ISBN 978-0-9754829-0-2
- The George Costakis Collection. "Russian Avant-Garde Art". New York: Harry N. Abrams, Inc. ISBN 978-0-8109-1556-5. 1981
- "Anatoly Zverev". Koursos Gallery , New York. 1986
- "Anatoly Zverev. Painting, Drawing". P.S. Moscow. 1991. ISBN 5-86238-005-1.
- "Анатолий Зверев". Н. Г. Григорьева. Издательство "Знание". 1991
- "Анатолий Зверев. Современники о художнике". Фонд имени М. Ю. Лермонтова. Moscow. ISBN 978-5-7690-0009-6. 1995
- Excerpts from the presentation by Ann Messerer at Macquarie University, Sydney, July 1995
- "Zverev". The State Tretyakov Gallery, Kino Gallery, Moscow. Printed by RASTER'S, Moscow. 1999
